= Sgùrr Thuilm =

Mountain in Scotland

Coordinates: 56.93719°N 5.38939°W

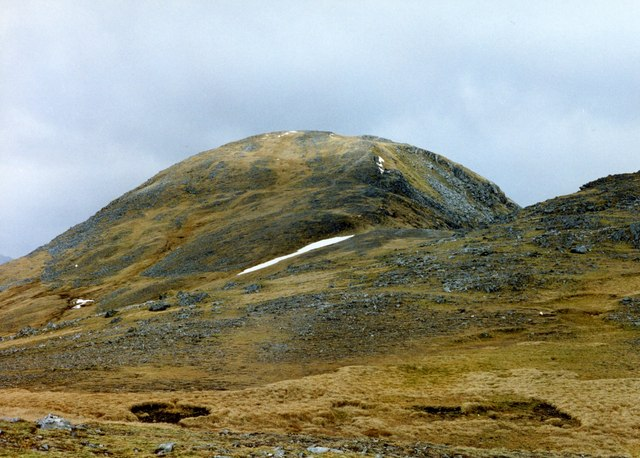

Highest point
- Elevation: 963 m (3,159 ft)
- Prominence: 614 m (2,014 ft)
- Listing: Munro, Marilyn

Naming
- English translation: Rocky peak of the hillock
- Language of name: Gaelic

Geography
- Location: Highland, Scotland
- Parent range: Northwest Highlands
- OS grid: NM93928796
- Topo map: OS Landranger 40

Sgùrr Thuilm is a mountain in the Glenfinnan area of the Highlands of Scotland. It stands at the head of Glen Finnan approximately 7 kilometres (4 mi) north of Loch Shiel.

== Overview ==
Sgùrr Thuilm reaches a height of 963 metres (3,159 ft) and is classified as a Munro. The mountain also qualifies as a Marilyn with a significant prominence of 614 metres (2,014 ft). It is positioned at the head of Glen Finnan and is invariably climbed along with the neighbouring Munro of Sgùrr nan Coireachan to which it is joined by a rocky ridge. It lies just outwith the Rough Bounds of Knoydart but shares many of the characteristics of the mountains of that region.

The name translates from the Gaelic as Rocky peak of the hillock.

== Geography ==
Sgùrr Thuilm is a steep sided, craggy mountain positioned at the eastern end of a winding ridge which also contains the Munro Sgùrr nan Coireachan and several other less prominent peaks. This ridge encloses Coire Thollaidh, in which the River Finnan has its source. The north side of the mountain is craggy with several coires dropping towards Glen Pean. To the south and east is the narrow Gleann Cuirnean which divides Sgùrr Thuilm from Streap, a neighbouring Corbett.

Sgùrr Thuilm has three distinct ridges: the curved western ridge connects it to Sgùrr nan Coireachan; the northeastern ridge runs into Glen Peann via a subsidiary top Meall an Fhir-eoin; and the southwestern ridge, named Druim Coire a' Bheithe, drops to Glenfinnan Lodge.

== Ascents ==
Sgùrr Thuilm can be climbed from both Glen Finnan to the south, or from the northeast by way of the public road at the west end of Loch Arkaig. The Glen Finnan approach is slightly longer, although it is possible to cycle part way up the glen.

From the A830 road on the west side of the River Finnan the ascent route follows Glen Finnan until a stalkers path is picked up which leads onto the south east ridge of Sgùrr nan Coireachan. From this summit a traverse east along a rough ridge over two smaller summits is completed to reach Sgùrr Thuilm. The return to Glen Finnan can be achieved by descending south and then southwest down the Druim Coire a' Bheithe.

== References and footnotes ==
- The Munros, Scottish Mountaineering Trust, 1986, Donald Bennet (Editor) ISBN 0-907521-13-4
- The High Mountains of Britain and Ireland, Diadem, 1993, Irvine Butterfield, ISBN 0-906371-30-9
- Hamish’s Mountain Walk, Baton Wicks, 1996, Hamish Brown, ISBN 1-898573-08-5
- The Munro - Scotland's Highest Mountains, 2006, Cameron McNeish, ISBN 1-84204-082-0

Footnotes
