= Allt Coire an Tuim =

River in Highland, Scotland

Coordinates: 56.89900°N 5.37245°W

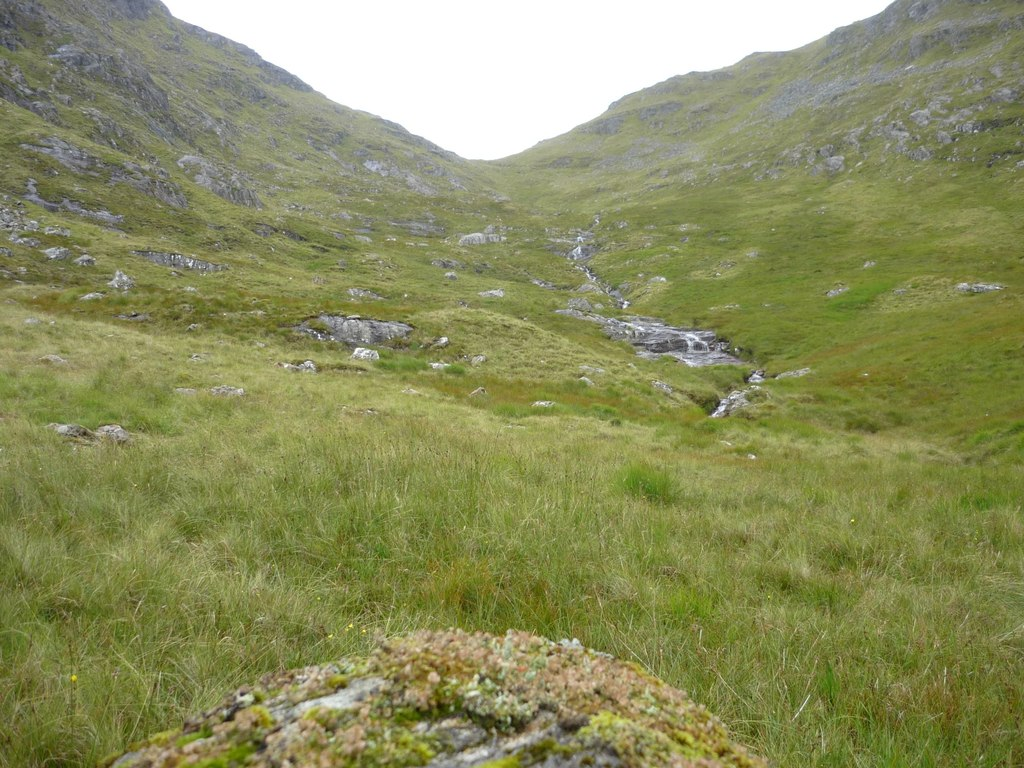
Allt Coire an Tuim, looking west towards its source

Allt Coire an Tuim is a river in the Lochaber area of Highland, Scotland, that is a tributary to Dubh Lighe. It flows through the Northwest Highlands of the Scottish Highlands.

== Course ==
Rising from a drainage basin between the mountains of Beinn an Tuim and Meall an Uillt Chaoil in the Northwest Highlands, Allt Coire an Tuim flows east into the Gleann Dubh Lighe glen (valley), where it flows into Dubh Lighe.
