= Dubh Lighe =

River in Highland, Scotland

Coordinates: 56.85542°N 5.33794°W

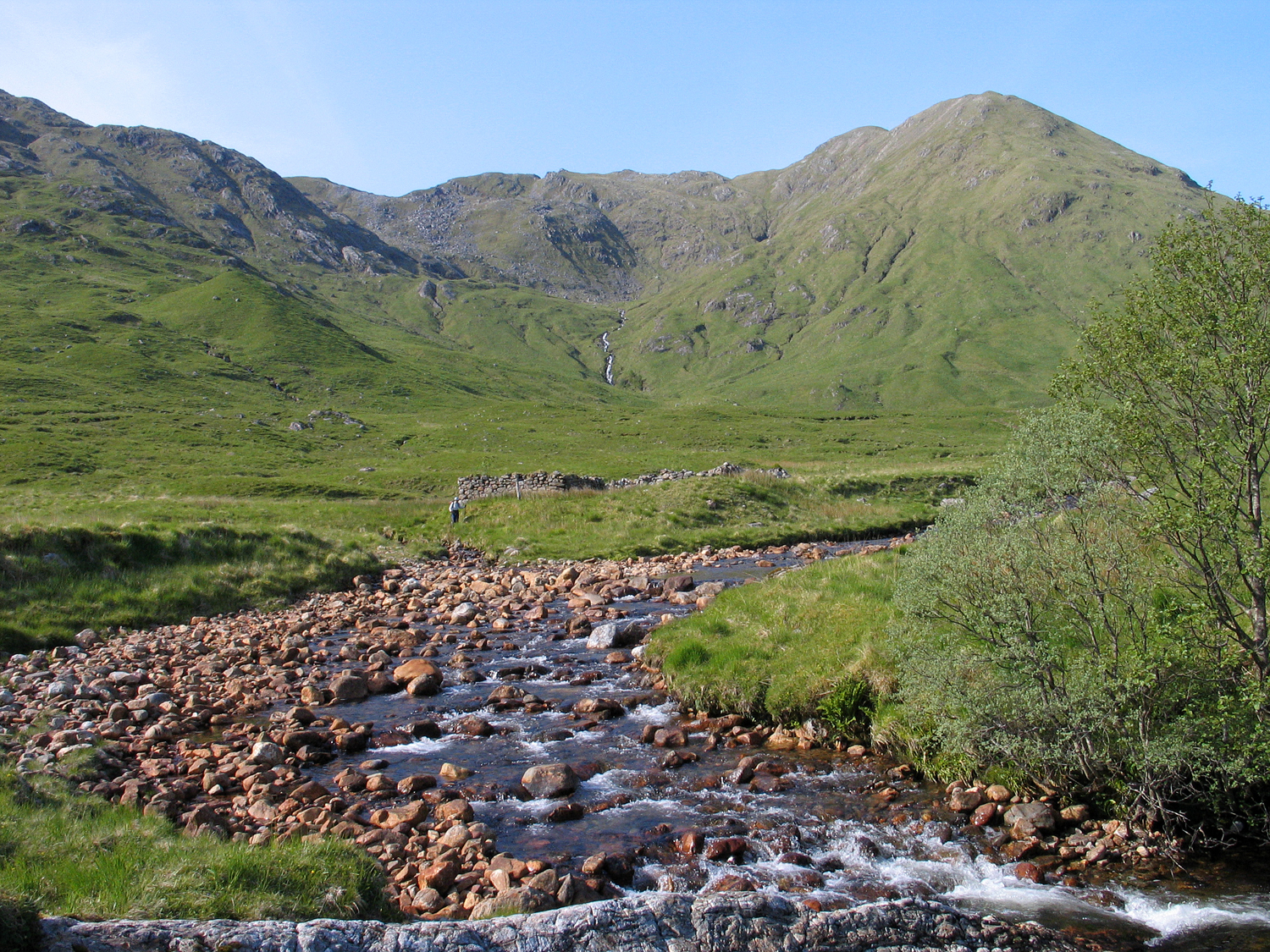
Dubh Lighe in 2005, looking north

Dubh Lighe is a 2-kilometre (1.2 mi) long river in Lochaber, Highland, Scotland that flows the Gleann Dubh Lighe glen (valley), before flowing into Loch Eil, itself giving waters to Loch Linnhe.

== Etymology ==
Dub Lighe means "dark stream".

== Course ==
Rising from a drainage basin south of Streap in the Northwest Highlands, Dubh Lighe flows a southeasterly course through the eponymous Gleann Dubh Lighe glen. It receives the waters of Alt Coal and Allt Coire an Tuim. After flowing under the West Highland Line just east of Glenfinnan via a bridge, Dubh Lighe turns east, and flows into Loch Eil.
