= Frederick Gardiner (mountaineer) =

British ship-owner, explorer and mountaineer (1850–1919)

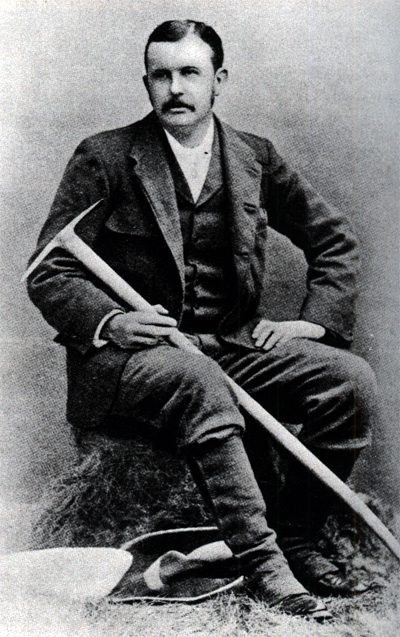
- Frederick Gardiner, 1900
- Born: 22 August 1850; Liverpool
- Died: 28 March 1919 (aged 68); Liverpool
- Occupation: Ship-owner
- Relatives: Kate Gardiner (daughter)

Frederick Gardiner (1850–1919) was a British ship-owner, explorer and mountaineer. A pioneer of mountaineering without guides, he made the first ascent of the 5,642 m (18,510 ft) Mount Elbrus and carried out a large number of other climbs in the Alps and the Caucasus.

== Biography ==
Gardiner was born on 22 August 1850 in the Liverpool suburbs, the son of George Neish Gardiner, a wealthy merchant and ship-owner.

Frederick Gardiner made his living as a ship-owner, he married Alice Evans of Warrington in 1881 and together they had four children. He died on 28 March 1919, aged 68, leaving an estate of £56,128 (about £3.5 million in 2022).

== Alpinism ==
Gardiner was introduced to mountaineering, in Snowdonia, by his father at the age of eleven, his first alpine ascent was made in 1869 when he ascended Monte Rosa.

The following year, with Lucy Walker and her father, he climbed the Matterhorn, the first ascent by a woman and only five years after Whymper had first ascended the mountain.

He made the first ascent of Mount Elbrus with F. Crauford Grove, Horace Walker and the guide Peter Knubel of St. Niklaus in 1874 and it was also in 1874 that he first joined forces with Charles and Lawrence Pilkington, the cousins of his future wife. He regularly hired Peter Knubel as his guide, Knubel was with him on Elbrus and they had made the first ascents of Les Rouies and the Roche Faurio together before that. Knubel was also with Gardiner on the first ascent of the west ridge of Mont Collon in 1876, the other member of the Mont Collon party was Arthur Cust who had made the first guideless ascent of the Matterhorn only two weeks beforehand.

In 1878 Gardiner and the two Pilkington brothers started mountaineering without guides, Gardiner "drew up the programme and made all necessary arrangements" for their first foray which was to the Dauphiné Alps. The first guideless ascent of the Barre des Écrins and the first ascent of Pointe des Arcas were amongst the successes of that trip. They made further guideless alpine ascents during the summers of 1879 and 1881, revisiting the Dauphiné and climbing in the Bernese Oberland and the Pennine Alps. 1881 was the final season they climbed together, and also the year of Gardiner's marriage. Gardiner and the two Pilkington brothers were credited as "the first to show that the amateur mountaineer could safely undertake, without professional assistance, expeditions of the very first rank".

After his marriage Gardiner shared the ascent of many high alpine peaks with his wife, these included the Wetterhorn (both in summer and in winter), the Mönch, and the Jungfrau. He also introduced his children to alpine mountaineering and his daughter Kate went on to become an accomplished female mountaineer, making a number of notable first ascents between 1920-1940 and climbing extensively in the New Zealand Alps and the Rockies as well as in Europe.

Gardiner encountered Coolidge at La Bérarde in the Dauphiné Alps in 1879 and in 1880, when the Pilkingtons were unable to visit the alps, Gardiner and Coolidge spent a season climbing together (with Coolidge's guides the Almers). A long-standing friendship developed: Coolidge became god-father to Gardiner's youngest son and when Coolidge fell ill and had to undergo an operation in 1913 Gardiner spent much of August by his bedside in Switzerland. Each season between 1885 and 1893 they climbed in the Alps together, and Gardiner continued climbing with the Almers until 1914 after Coolidge had dropped out in 1893. After Gardiner's death, Coolidge compiled a brochure setting out Gardiner's activities over 46 alpine seasons.

Gardiner served as vice-president of the Alpine Club from 1896 to 1898 (the same period that Charles Pilkington, one of his regular alpine climbing partners, was president).

== Significant ascents ==
- 1873 – First ascent of Les Rouies with Thomas Cox, William Martin Pendlebury, Charles Taylor, Hans and Peter Baumann, Peter Knubel and Josef Marie Lochmatter (19 June)
- 1873 – First ascent of the Roche Faurio with Thomas Cox, William Martin Pendlebury, Charles Taylor, Hans and Peter Baumann, Peter Knubel and Josef Marie Lochmatter (21 June)
- 1874 – First ascent of the main (western) summit of Elbrus with F. Crauford Grove, Horace Walker and Peter Knubel (28 July)
- 1876 – First ascent of the west ridge of Mont Collon with A. Cust, H. Knubel and Peter Knubel (3 August)
- 1878 – First ascent of Pointe des Arcas with Charles Pilkington and Lawrence Pilkington (12 July)
- 1878 – First guideless ascent of the Barre des Écrins with Charles Pilkington and Lawrence Pilkington (19 July)
- 1879 – First guideless ascent of La Meije with Charles Pilkington and Lawrence Pilkington (25 July)
- 1881 – First guideless ascent of the Jungfrau with Charles Pilkington and Lawrence Pilkington (30 July)
- 1881 – First guideless ascent of the Finsteraarhorn with Charles Pilkington and Lawrence Pilkington
