= Sgùrr MhicChoinnich =

Mountain in Scotland

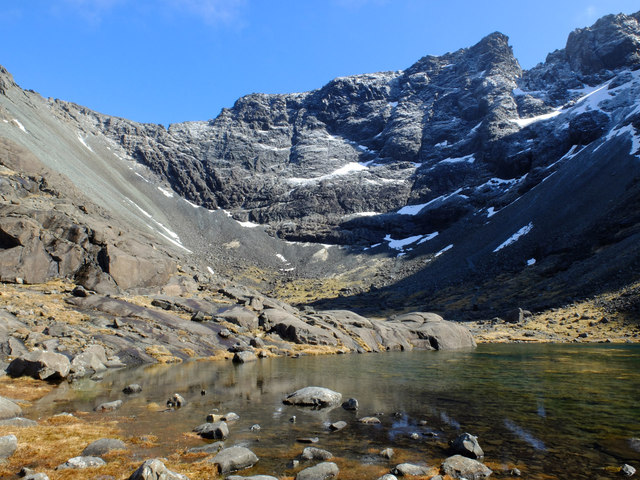
- Sgùrr MhicChoinnich rising behind Loch Lagan, with the An Stac scree slope on the left

Highest point
- Elevation: 948.1 m (3,111 ft)
- Prominence: c. 56 m
- Listing: Munro
- Coordinates: 57.20856°N 6.22442°W

Naming
- English translation: MacKenzie's Peak
- Language of name: Gaelic
- Pronunciation: Scottish Gaelic: [ˈs̪kuːrˠ içˈkɤɲɪç]

Geography
- Location: Skye, Scotland
- Parent range: Cuillin
- OS grid: NG450210
- Topo map: OS Landranger 32, OS

Sgùrr MhicChoinnich is a mountain on the Isle of Skye in Scotland. It is in the Black Cuillin range of mountains and is classified as a Munro. Like all the other Black Cuillin mountains it is made predominantly of gabbro rock and has little vegetation. The mountain is named after the mountain guide John MacKenzie who was with Charles Pilkington, James Heelis and Horace Walker in 1887 when the peak was first ascended.

The most common route to the summit involves climbing the An Stac scree slopes out of Coire Lagan to reach the bealach between Sgùrr MhicChoinnich and Sgùrr Dearg. From here an airy and challenging scramble up the peak's north ridge is required to attain the summit. The ascent is a challenging climb by the standards of British mountains, being an exposed scramble at Grade 2 standard. The south face of the mountain, by contrast, falls sheer to the bealach between Sgùrr MhicChoinnich and Sgùrr Thearlaich, and the easiest route up this face (King's Chimney) is a V. Diff rock climb. Moreover, this bealach cannot be reached from below without further rock climbing, and the north ridge of Sgùrr Thearlaich which leads down to the bealach contains an awkward rock step (a Moderate rock climb) which must be taken in descent. For those with the ability to reach this bealach, however, a remarkable terrace, Collie's Ledge, which is only a Grade 2 scramble, avoids King's Chimney entirely by traversing the western flank of the peak and joining up with the north ridge. This ledge is difficult to find, but when located, it is often used by mountaineers on the full traverse of the Cuillin ridge to gain the summit without having to climb King's Chimney.
