= Mont Collon =

Mountain in Switzerland

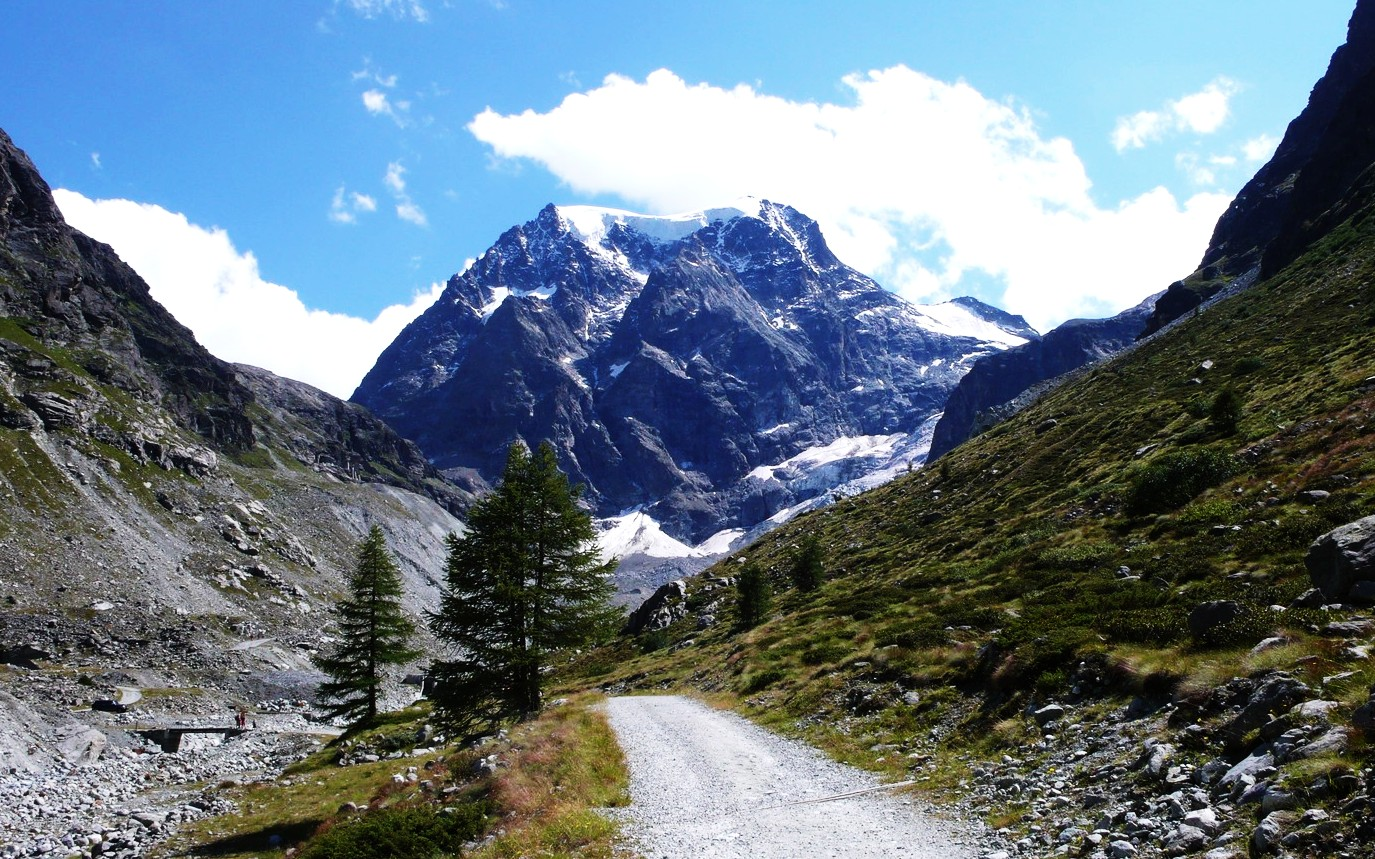
- The north face of Mont Collon from the Arolla valley

Highest point
- Elevation: 3,637 m (11,932 ft)
- Prominence: 208 m (682 ft)
- Parent peak: L'Evêque
- Coordinates: 45°58′35″N 7°30′17″E

Geography
- Location within Switzerland
- Location: Valais, Switzerland
- Parent range: Pennine Alps

Climbing
- First ascent: 31 July 1867 by George Edward Foster, Hans Baumann and Johann Kronig

Mont Collon (3,637 m) is a mountain of the Swiss Pennine Alps in the canton of Valais. Its glaciated north face dominates the view south from the village of Arolla.

The ascent over the West Ridge, first made by A. Cust and Frederick Gardiner with the guides Peter Knubel and Johannes Knubel of St. Niklaus in the canton Valais on 3 August 1876, is now the normal route.
