= Sgùrr nan Coireachan (Glenfinnan) =

Mountain in Scotland

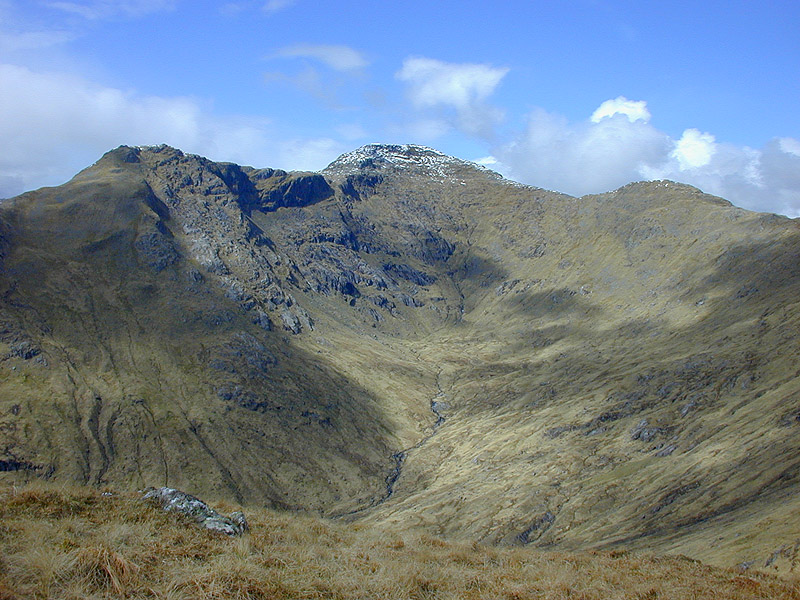
- The north face of Sgùrr nan Coireachan

Highest point
- Elevation: 956 m (3,136 ft)
- Prominence: 234 m (768 ft)
- Listing: Munro, Marilyn
- Coordinates: 56°56′07″N 5°26′55″W

Geography
- Location: Lochaber, Scotland
- Parent range: Northwest Highlands
- OS grid: NM902880
- Topo map: OS Landranger 40

Sgùrr nan Coireachan (956 m) is a mountain in the Northwest Highlands, Scotland. It lies north of Glenfinnan in Lochaber.

One of a pair of neighbouring Munros (the other being Sgùrr Thuilm), it is a steep and rocky peak with great views from its summit. It is usually climbed from its southern Glennfinnan side.
