= Munro =

Scottish peak over 3,000 ft and listed on the SMC tables

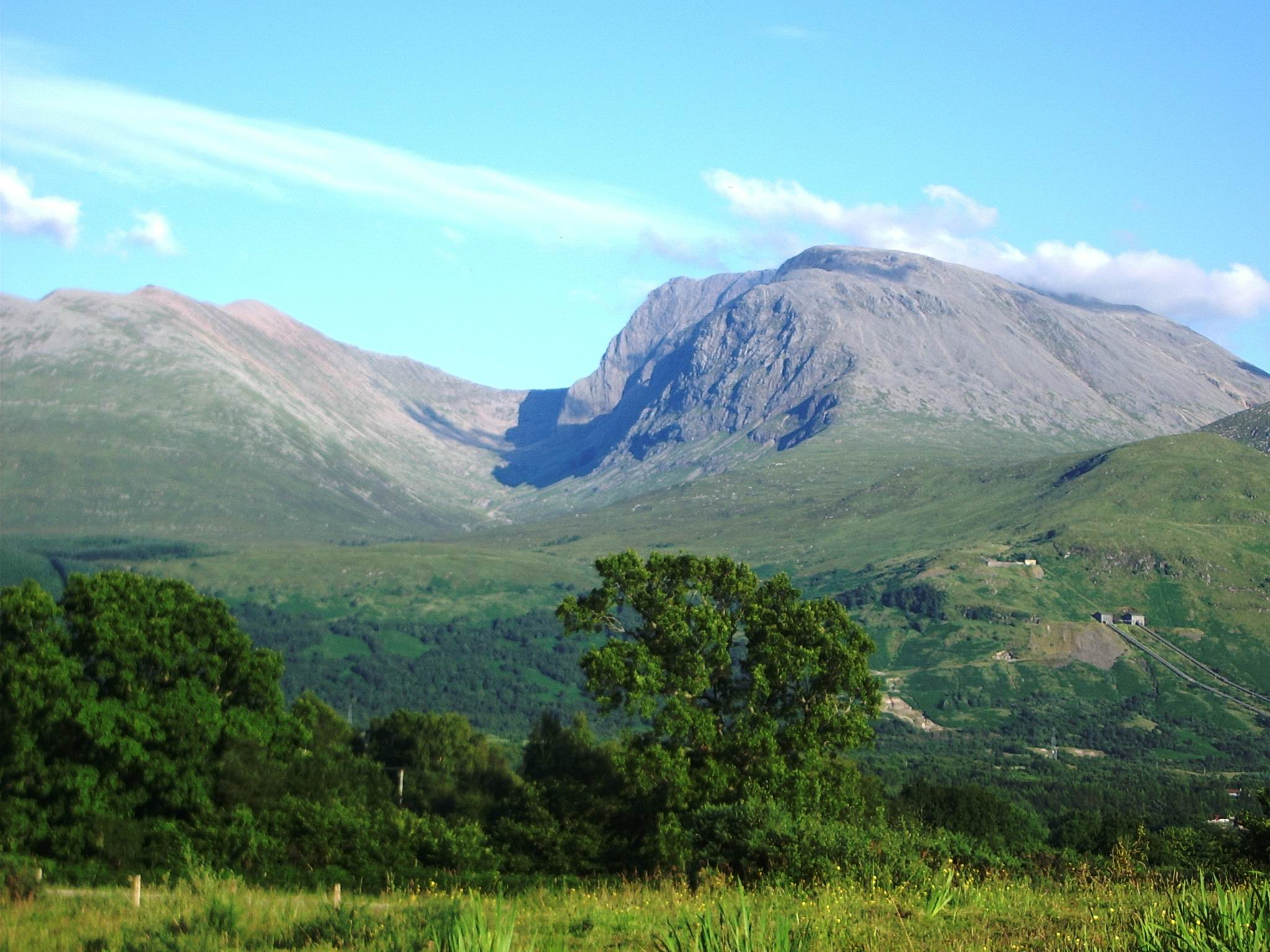
Ben Nevis is the highest Munro and highest mountain in Britain

A Munro (Scottish Gaelic: Rothach) is defined as a mountain in Scotland with a height over 3,000 feet (914.4 m), and which is on the Scottish Mountaineering Club (SMC) official list of Munros; there is no explicit topographical prominence requirement. The best known Munro is Ben Nevis (Beinn Nibheis), the highest mountain in the British Isles at 1,345 m.

Munros are named after Sir Hugh Munro, 4th Baronet (1856–1919), who produced the first list of such hills, known as Munro's Tables, in 1891. Also included were what Munro considered lesser peaks, now known as Munro Tops, which are also over 3,000 feet but are lower than the nearby primary mountain. The publication of the original list is usually considered to be the epoch event of modern peak bagging. The list has been the subject of subsequent variation and as of 10 December 2020, the Scottish Mountaineering Club has listed 282 Munros and 226 Munro Tops.

"Munro bagging" is the activity of climbing all the listed Munros. As of 31 December 2023, 7,654 people had reported completing a round. The first continuous round was completed by Hamish Brown in 1974, whilst the record for the fastest continuous round is held by ultra runner Jamie Aarons, who completed a round in 31 days 10 hours 27 min in June 2023. Furths are mountains in England, Wales or Ireland recognized by the SMC as meeting the Munro classification.

== History ==
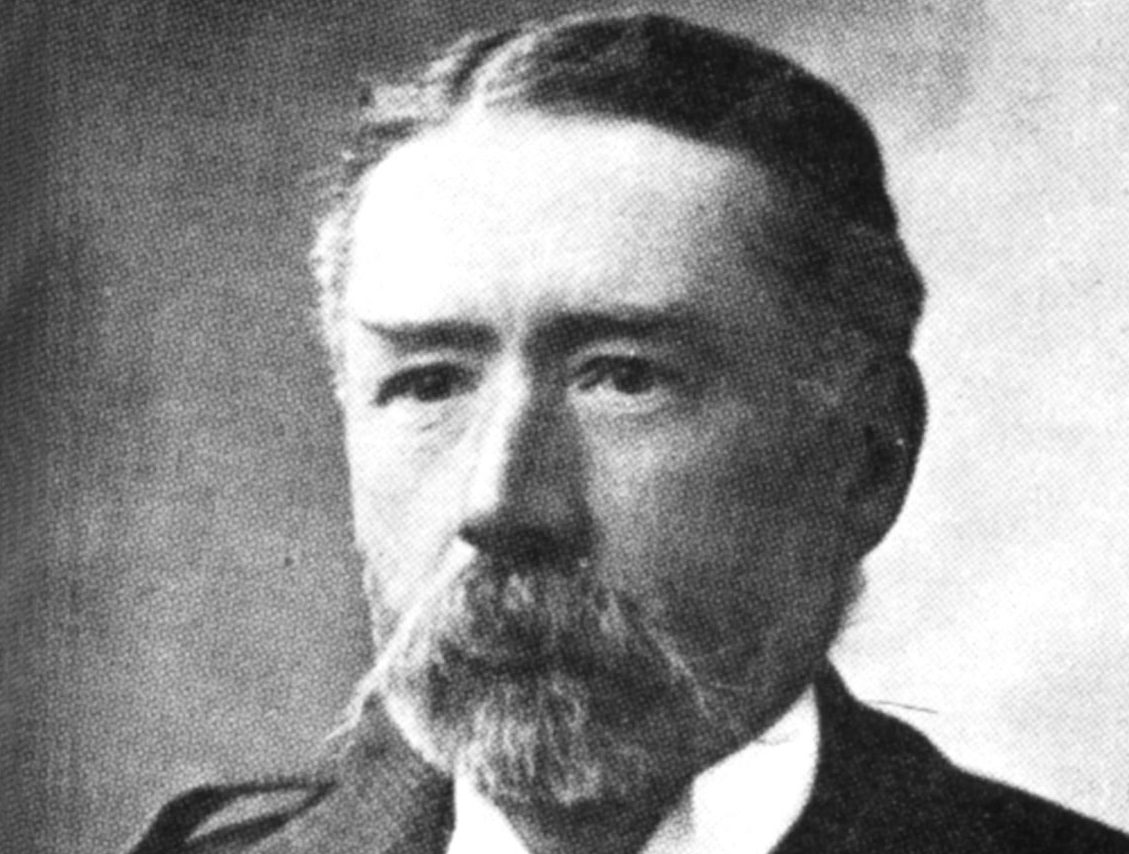
Sir Hugh Munro, 4th Baronet, creator of Munro's Tables

Before the publication of Munro's Tables in 1891, there was much uncertainty about the number of Scottish peaks over 3,000 feet. Estimates ranged from 31 (in M.J.B. Baddeley's guides) to 236 (listed in Robert Hall's third edition of The Highland Sportsman and Tourist, published in 1884). When the Scottish Mountaineering Club was formed in 1889, one of its aims was to remedy this by accurately documenting all of Scotland's mountains over 3,000 feet. Sir Hugh Munro, a founding member of the club, took on the task using his own experience as a mountaineer, as well as detailed study of the Ordnance Survey six-inch-to-the-mile (1:10,560) and one-inch-to-the-mile (1:63,360) maps.

Munro researched and produced a set of tables that were published in the Scottish Mountaineering Club Journal in September 1891. The tables listed 538 summits over 3,000 feet, 282 of which were regarded as "separate mountains". The term Munro applies to separate mountains, while the lesser summits are known as Munro Tops. Munro did not set any measure of topographic prominence by which a peak qualified as a separate mountain, so there has been much debate about how distinct two hills must be if they are to be counted as two separate Munros.

The Scottish Mountaineering Club has revised the tables, both in response to new height data on Ordnance Survey maps and to address the perceived inconsistency as to which peaks qualify for Munro status. In 1992, the publication of Alan Dawson's book Relative Hills of Britain, showed that three Munro Tops not already considered summits, had a prominence of more than 500 feet (152.4 m). Given this they would have qualified as Corbett summits had they been under 3,000 feet. In the 1997 tables these three Munro Tops, on Beinn Alligin, Beinn Eighe and Buachaille Etive Beag, gained full Munro summit status. Dawson's book also highlighted a number of significant Munro Tops with as much as 197 feet (60 m) of prominence which were not listed as Munro Tops. The 1997 tables promoted five of these to full Munro status.

A total of 197 Munros have a topographic prominence of over 150 m (492 ft), thus also being classified as Marilyns: these hills have been termed "Real Munros" in some sources. Similarly, the 130 Scottish mountains over 1000 m, with a topographic prominence of over 100 m (328 ft) have been termed "Metric Munros".

Other classification schemes in Scotland, such as the Corbetts 2,500 to 3,000 ft (762–914 m) and Grahams 2,000 to 2,500 ft (610–762 m), require a peak to have a prominence of at least 500 feet (152 m) for inclusion. The Munros, however, lack a rigid set of criteria for inclusion, with many summits of lesser prominence listed, principally because their summits are hard to reach.

Between April 2007 and July 2015 the Munro Society re-surveyed twenty mountains and tops that were known to be close to the 3,000 ft figure to determine their height more accurately. On 10 September 2009 the society announced that the mountain Sgùrr nan Ceannaichean, south of Glen Carron, had a height of 2,996 feet 10 inches (913.43 m). Therefore, the Scottish Mountaineering Club removed the Munro status of Sgùrr nan Ceannaichean and this mountain is now a Corbett. In a Summer 2011 height survey by The Munro Society, Beinn a' Chlaidheimh was found to be 2,998 feet 8 inches (914 m) and thus short of the Munro mark. On 6 September 2012, the Scottish Mountaineering Club demoted it from Munro to Corbett status. On 26 August 2020, the SMC confirmed that Beinn a' Chroin West Top at 938 m was deleted as a Munro Top and Beinn a' Chroin East Top became the new Munro Top at 940.1 m. The summit height of Beinn a' Chroin was also changed to 941.4 m. As of 10 December 2020, there were 226 Scottish Munro Tops after Stob Coire na Cloiche, a Munro Top to Parent Peak Sgùrr nan Ceathramhnan, was surveyed at 912.5 m and was deleted as a Munro Top and downgraded to a Corbett Top.

As of 10 December 2020, the Scottish Mountaineering Club lists 282 Munros and 226 Munro Tops. The current SMC list totals 508 summits.

== Notable peaks ==
The most famous Munro is Ben Nevis (Beinn Nibheis) in the Lochaber area. It is the highest peak in the British Isles, with an elevation of 4,411 ft (1,345 m)

Other well-known Munros include:

- Ben Macdui (Beinn Macduibh), 4,296 ft (1,309.3 m), is the second highest peak in the British Isles; Braeriach (Am Bràigh Riabhach), 4,252 ft (1,296 m), is the third highest peak in the British Isles and Cairn Gorm (An Càrn Gorm), 4,084 ft (1,244.8 m), is the sixth highest peak in the British Isles. These three Munros are located together in the Cairngorms
- Beinn Teallach, 3,001 ft (914.6 m), in Lochaber is the lowest Munro
- Ben Hope (Beinn Hòb), 3,041 ft (927 m), in Sutherland is the most northerly Munro
- Mount Keen (Monadh Caoin), 3,082 ft (939.4 m), in Glen Mark is the most easterly Munro
- Ben Lomond (Beinn Laomainn), 3,195 ft (973.7 m), at Loch Lomond and The Trossachs National Park is the most southerly Munro
- Sgùrr na Banachdaich, 3,166 ft (965 m), in the Black Cuillin on the Isle of Skye is the most westerly Munro
- Schiehallion (Sìdh Chailleann), 3,554 ft (1,083.3 m), in Perth and Kinross, is a Munro often described as lying at the centre of Scotland
- Bidean nam Bian, 3,771 ft (1,149.4 m); Buachaille Etive Mòr (Buachaille Èite Mòr) (Stob Dearg), 3,351 ft (1021.4 m), at the entrance to Glen Coe, Buachaille Etive Mòr (Buachaille Èite Mòr) (Stob na Bròige), 3,128 ft (953.4 m); Aonach Eagach (Sgor nam Fiannaidh), 3,175 ft (967.7 m)/Aonach Eagach (Meall Dearg), 3,124 ft (952.3 m), are regarded as the two most difficult Munros for extreme exposure while scrambling including the longest and narrowest ridge on mainland Britain, though it competes with Liathach and An Teallach for this title; and finally Buachaille Etive Beag (Buachaille Èite Beag) (Stob Dubh), 3,143 ft (958 m)/Buachaille Etive Beag (Buachaille Èite Beag) (Stob Coire Raineach), 3,033 ft (924.5 m). These seven Munros are located together in Glen Coe
- Sgùrr Alasdair, 3,255 ft (992 m); Sgùrr Dearg – Inaccessible Pinnacle, 3,234 ft (985.8 m), is the hardest Munro and the only Munro with a peak that can only be reached by rock climbing and abseiling; Sgùrr a' Ghreadaidh, 3,189 ft (972.1 m); Sgùrr nan Gillean, 3,170 ft (966.1 m); Bruach na Frìthe, 3,146 ft (958.8 m); Sgùrr Mhic Choinnich, 3,111 ft (948.1 m); Sgùrr Dubh Mòr, 3,097 ft (944.1 m); Am Basteir (Am Baisteir), 3,064 ft (934 m); Sgùrr nan Eag, 3,039 ft (926.3 m) and Sgùrr a' Mhadaidh, 3,012 ft (918 m). These ten Munros including one other (Sgùrr na Banachdaich, as shown above) provide part of the most spectacular, toughest and longest single mountaineering challenge anywhere in the British Isles and are located together in the Black Cuillin on the Isle of Skye
- Blà Bheinn (Blaven), 3,047 ft (928.8 m), in the Black Cuillin Outlier (Blaven group) on the Isle of Skye
- Liathach (Spidean a' Choire Lèith), 3,461 ft (1,054.8 m)/Liathach (Mullach an Rathain), 3,359 ft (1,023.9 m); Beinn Eighe (Ruadh-stac Mòr), 3,314 ft (1,010 m)/Beinn Eighe (Spidean Coire nan Clach), 3,258 ft (993 m) and Beinn Alligin (Beinn Àilleagan) (Sgùrr Mhòr), 3,235 ft (986 m)/Beinn Alligin (Beinn Àilleagan) (Tom na Gruagaich), 3,025 ft (922 m). These six Munros are located together in Torridon
- An Teallach (Bidean a' Ghlas Thuill), 3,486 ft (1,062.6 m)/An Teallach (Sgùrr Fiona), 3,473 ft (1,058.7 m). These two Munros are located together in Dundonnell
- Sgùrr na Cìche, 3,413 ft (1,040.2 m) and Ladhar Bheinn, 3,346 ft (1,020 m). These two Munros are located in Knoydart
- The Saddle (An Dìollaid), 3,318 ft (1,011.4 m), in Glen Shiel
- A' Mhaighdean, 3,169 ft (965.8 m), and Slioch (Sleaghach), 3,219 ft (981 m). These two Munros are located together in Wester Ross between the Fisherfield Forest and Letterewe Forest
- Ben Cruachan (Cruach na Beinne), 3,698 ft (1,127 m), at Loch Awe, gives its name to the Cruachan Power Station (also known as the Cruachan Dam), a pumped-storage hydroelectric power station located in a cavern inside the mountain

== Remotest Munros ==
- Carn an Fhidhleir, 3,261 ft (994 m), from Linn of Dee via White Bridge has a distance of 11.40 miles
- A' Mhaighdean, 3,169 ft (965.8 m), from Incheril via Gleann Bianasdail has a distance of 10.98 miles
- Beinn Bheoil, 3,343 ft (1,019 m), from Rannoch Lodge via Ben Alder Cottage has a distance of 10.46 miles
- Ruadh Stac Mor (Ruadh-Stac Mòr), 3,014 ft (918.7 m), from A832 near Corrie Hallie via Shenavall has a distance of 10.37 miles
- Ben Alder (Beinn Eallair), 3,766 ft (1,148 m), from Corrour railway station via Loch Ossian has a distance of 10.34 miles
- Mullach na Dheiragain, 3,222 ft (982 m), from A87 near Cluanie Inn via Alltbeithe has a distance of 10.25 miles
- An Sgarsoch, 3,302 ft (1,006.5 m), from Linn of Dee via White Bridge has a distance of 10.16 miles

== Peak bagging ==
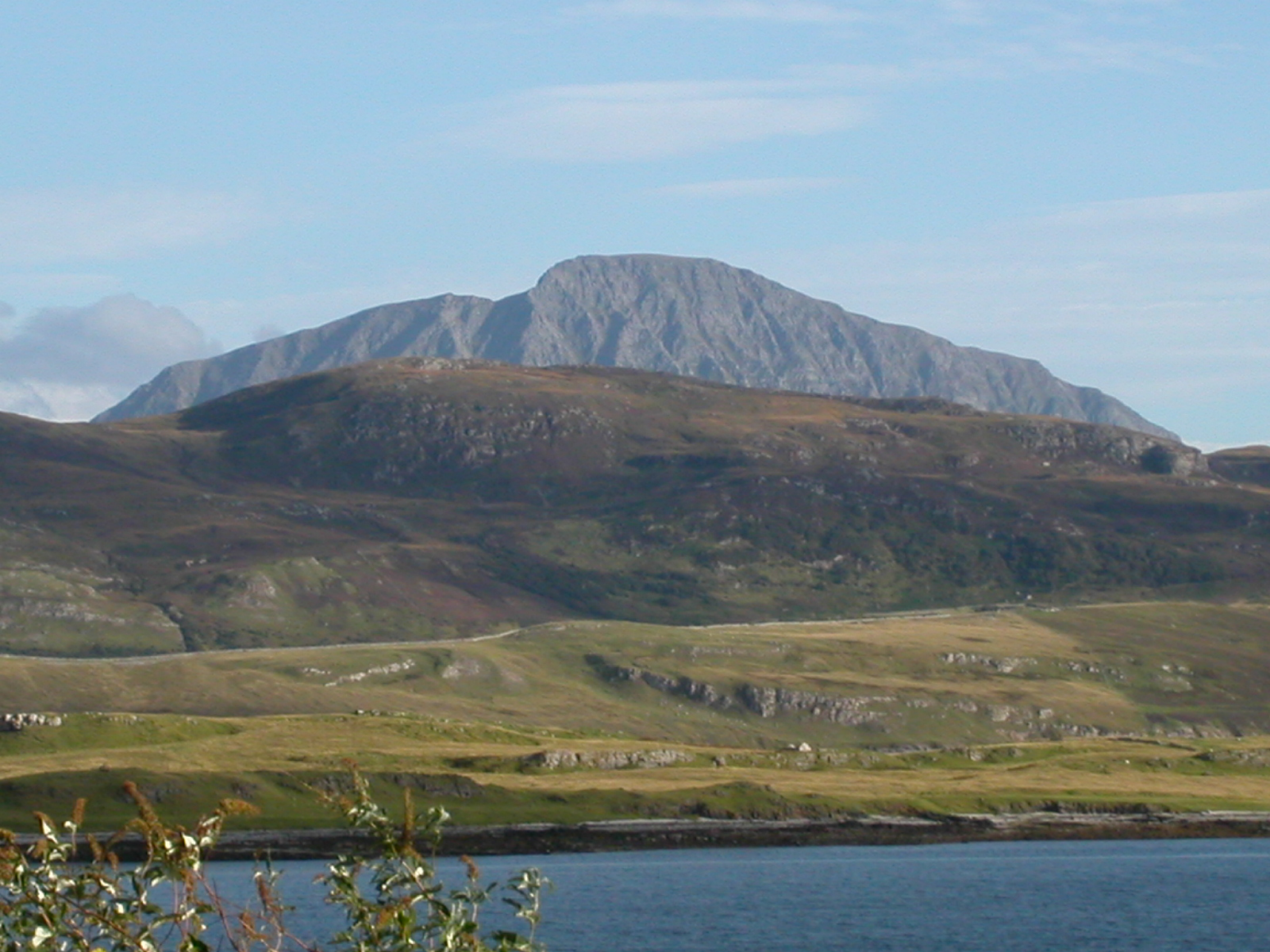
Ben Hope is the most northerly Munro

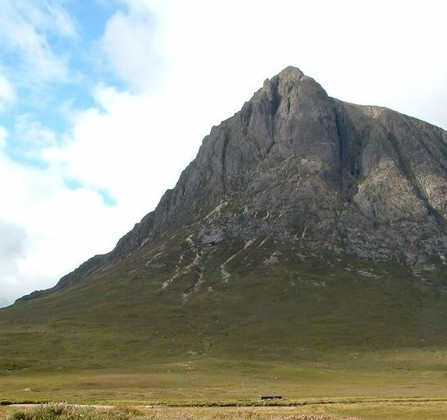
Buachaille Etive Mòr's north-east face

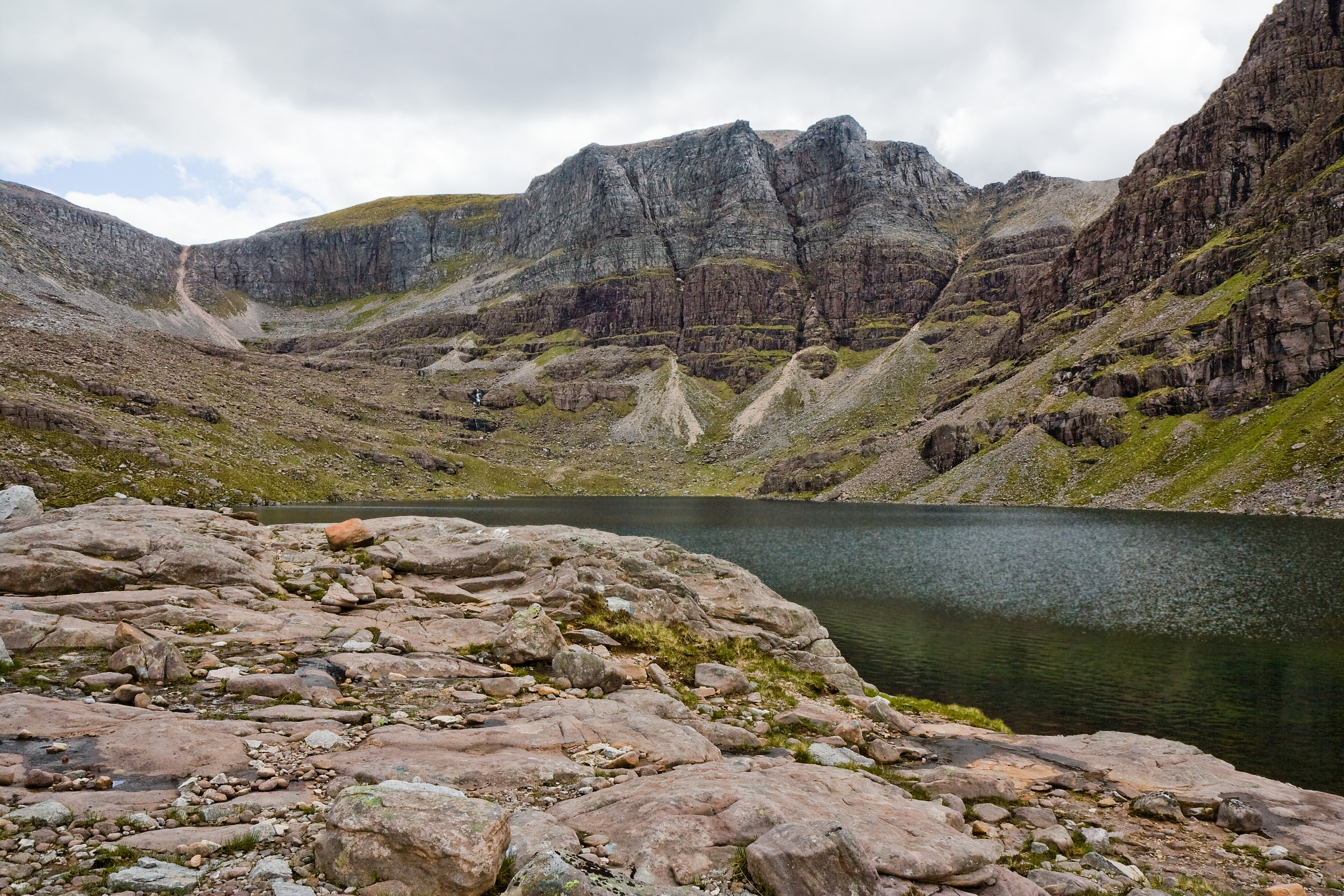
The triple buttresses of Coire Mhic Fearchair on Beinn Eighe

When compared to continental ranges, such as The Alps, Scottish peaks are generally lesser in height. However, walking and climbing in them can still be dangerous and difficult to navigate the recommended routes due to their latitude and exposure to Atlantic and Arctic weather systems. Even in summer, the weather can change quickly in the mountains and conditions can be atrocious; thunderstorms, thick fog, strong winds, driving rain and freezing summit temperatures close to 0 °C are not unusual.

Winter ascents of some Munros are serious undertakings due to the unpredictable weather, the likelihood of ice and snow, and poor visibility. Each ascent becomes a test of skill, endurance, and determination, as trekkers navigate through snowdrifts, icy slopes, and unpredictable weather conditions. Some hikers try even unprepared for extreme weather on the exposed tops and fatalities are recorded every year, often resulting from slips on wet rock or ice.

The activity of attempting to climb every Munro is known as "Munro bagging". Munro-bagging is a form of peak bagging. A walker who has climbed all Munros is entitled to be called a Munroist. Descending a Munro by funicular is known as de-bagging.

=== Notable completions ===
The Scottish Mountaineering Club maintains a list of walkers who have reported completing the Munros. As of 31 December 2023, there are 7,654 names on the list. (The club uses the spelling compleator for someone who has completed the Munros.)

Hugh Munro never completed his own list, missing out on Càrn an Fhidhleir and Càrn Cloich-mhuillin (downgraded to a Munro Top in 1981). Sir Hugh is said to have missed the Inaccessible Pinnacle of Sgùrr Dearg, on the Isle of Skye, which he never climbed. However the "In Pinn", as it is known colloquially within Scottish mountaineering, was only listed as a Munro Top on his list (despite being several metres higher than Sgùrr Dearg, which was listed as the main Munro Top).

The first "completionist" was to be the Reverend A. E. Robertson, in 1901, later minister at Braes of Rannoch from 1907. However, research has cast doubt on this claim, and it is not certain that he reached the summit of Ben Wyvis. Also it is known that Robertson did not climb the Inaccessible Peak of Sgùrr Dearg. If Robertson is discounted, the first Munroist is Ronald Burn, who completed in 1923. Burn is also (indisputably) the first person to climb all the Munro Tops.

The person with the most rounds of Munros is Steven Fallon from Edinburgh, who has completed 16 rounds as of 1 October 2019.

Chris Smith became the first Member of Parliament to complete the Munros when he reached the summit of Sgùrr nan Coireachan on 27 May 1989.

Ben Fleetwood is probably the youngest person to have completed a round. He climbed the final Munro of his round – Ben More – on 30 August 2011 at the age of 10 years and 3 months. The youngest completionist to have done the round without the presence of a parent or a guardian is probably Andy Nisbet, who finished his round in 1972 aged 18 years and 1 month.

In 2024 Anna Wells of Inverness became the first woman to reach the top of 282 Munros in one winter season.

==== Continuous rounds ====
Hamish Brown did the first continuous self-propelled round of the Munros (except for the Skye and Mull ferries) between 4 April and 24 July 1974 with 449,000 ft (137,000 m) of ascent and mostly walking 1,639 miles (2,638 km) – just 150 miles (241 km) were on a bicycle. The journey is fully documented in his book Hamish's Mountain Walk. The average time taken to bag all the Munros is eight years.

In 1984 George Keeping accomplished the first continuous round of the Munros entirely on foot (and ferry) in 135 days. He went on to complete the English and Welsh 3,000-foot peaks in a further 29 days.

The first reported completion of all the Munros plus the Munro Tops in one continuous expedition was by Chris Townsend in 1996. His trip lasted between 18 May and 12 September (118 days), he covered a distance of 1,770 miles (2,849 km) (240 miles or 386 kilometres by bicycle) with 575,000 ft (175,000 m) of ascent. The round was broken twice for spells at the office, which could be regarded as stretching the meaning of "continuous".

The first person to complete a winter round (all the Munros in one winter season) was Martin Moran in 1984–85. His journey lasted between 21 December 1984 and 13 March 1985 (83 days), he walked 1,028 miles (1,654 km) with 412,000 ft (126,000 m) of ascent. He used motor transport (campervan) to link his walk.

In the winter of 2005–06, Steve Perry completed a continuous unsupported round entirely on foot (and ferry). He is also the first person to have completed two continuous Munro rounds, having also walked Land's End to John O'Groats via every mainland 3,000 ft mountain between 18 February 2003 and 30 September 2003.

==== Fastest rounds ====
In 1990, international fell runner and maths teacher Hugh Symonds of Sedbergh, Yorkshire, ran all 277 Munros starting from Ben Hope. It took him 66 days and 22 hours. This also included running the other 3,000 foot peaks in Great Britain. Having achieved this in the short time of 83 days, when his target had been a hundred, he decided to add the Republic of Ireland tops to the list and still finished all 303 peaks in 97 days.

In July 1992, Andrew Johnstone of Aberdeen and Rory Gibson of Edinburgh completed their mountain triathlon across the Munros, the 277 Scottish peaks over 3,000 ft, beating the existing record by five days. They began on 29 May and finished at 8.30pm on 15 July on the summit of Ben Hope, the most northerly Munro, completing a journey which began 51 days and 10 hours earlier on the Isle of Mull. After swimming lochs, cycling highland roads and running across some of the most desolate and dangerous terrain in Britain, they covered 1,400 miles.

Charlie Campbell, a former postman from Glasgow, held the record for the fastest round of the Munros between 2000 and 2010. He completed his round in 48 days, 12 hours and 0 minutes, finishing on 16 July 2000, on Ben Hope. He cycled and swam between Munros; no motorised transport was used.

Campbell's record was broken by Stephen Pyke of Stone, Staffordshire, in 2010 who completed the round in 39 days, 9 hours and 6 minutes. Pyke's round started on the Isle of Mull on 25 April 2010 and finished on Ben Hope in Sutherland on 3 June 2010. He cycled and kayaked between Munros; no motorised transport was used. He was backed by a support team in a motor home, but had to camp out in the more remote areas.

On 18 September 2011, Alex Robinson and Tom O'Connell finished a self-propelled continuous round on Ben Hope in a time of 48 days, 6 hours and 56 minutes. At the age of just 21, Alex became the youngest person to have completed a continuous round without the use of any motorised transport.

On 17 September 2017, the women's self-propelled, continuous record was broken by Libby Kerr and Lisa Trollope in 76 days and 10 hours. This record would later be vastly broken by Jamie Aarons on 26 June 2023 who would also break the record for both the male and female fastest ever round.

On 2 September 2020, Pyke's record was broken by Donnie Campbell of Inverness. He completed his round in 31 days, 23 hours and 2 minutes, starting on the Isle of Mull on 1 August 2020 and finished on Ben Hope on 2 September 2020. Campbell ran the 282 Munros and cycled and kayaked between them. On day 29, he was joined by previous record holder Stephen Pyke. Whilst ticking off Mòruisg in the cloud, he mistook the big cairn for the summit and had to head back up and so climbed the Munro twice. On day 31, he completed 18 Munros. He was supported by a crew travelling in his motorhome, who also shuttled his bike for him to follow a more linear route.

On 26 June 2023, Jamie Aarons of California broke the previous record of fastest ever round held by former marine Donnie Campbell by more than 12 hours by completing a self-propelled continuous round in 31 days, 10 hours and 27 minutes. She also ran, cycled and kayaked between each of the Munros, covering a total of around 932 miles (1,500 km) on foot and about the same distance by bike. She began at Ben More on Mull and ended at Ben Klibreck in Sutherland, raising £14,000 for World Bicycle Relief.

== Furths ==
The SMC recognises six peaks in England, fifteen in Wales and thirteen in Ireland that would be Munros or Munro Tops if they were in Scotland. These are referred to as Furth Munros; furth is a Scottish word meaning "outside", so that the name means Munros outside Scotland. The first recorded Furthist is James Parker, who completed on Tryfan (Snowdonia) on 19 April 1929.

== See also ==
- List of mountains of the British Isles by height
- List of Munros and Munro Tops in Scotland
- List of Munros in Scotland by Section
- List of Murdos (mountains)
- Lists of mountains and hills in the British Isles
- Mountains and hills of Scotland
