= Pointe des Arcas =

- Location within France

Highest point
- Elevation: 3,478 m (11,411 ft)
- Coordinates: 44°55′35″N 6°26′51″E

Geography
- Location: Hautes-Alpes, France
- Parent range: Massif des Écrins

Climbing
- First ascent: 12 July 1878 by Frederick Gardiner, Charles and Lawrence Pilkington

Pointe des Arcas is a mountain in the French Alps. Located in the Massif des Écrins, the mountain is 3,478 metres (11,411 ft) tall.
