= Hamish Brown =

British mountain climber

Hamish Brown M.B.E. FRSGS is a professional writer, lecturer and photographer specialising in mountain and outdoor topics. He is best known for his walking exploits in the Scottish Highlands, having completed multiple rounds of the Munros and being the first person to walk all the Munros in a single trip with only ferries and a bicycle as means of transport.

== Early life ==
Born in Colombo, Ceylon (now modern-day Sri Lanka) on 13 August 1934, he lived in Japan for a time and then Singapore, escaping with his family in 1942 as it fell to the Japanese. They lived in South Africa for two years as refugees before returning to live in Scotland at the end of World War II. His family lived in Dollar and Brown spent much of his youth exploring the nearby Ochil Hills, which awakened his interest in the great outdoors. He was educated at Dollar Academy.

He travelled extensively in the Middle East and East Africa during the 1950s when serving in the RAF for his National Service. Between 1960 and 1972 he worked at Braehead School, Buckhaven, Fife and was in charge of outdoor activities at the school, introducing many of the pupils to walking in the Scottish Highlands as well as other outdoor activities. After a spell as a County Adviser, he decided to try to make a living as a freelance writer and photographer, specialising on "anything to do with mountains".

== Outdoor media ==
On 4 April 1974, Brown set off on his trip to complete all the Munro mountains in one trip. He completed the journey on 24 July; a journey of 112 days during which time he covered 1,639 miles (2,638 kilometres), climbed 289 peaks and wore out three pairs of boots. He only used the Isle of Mull and Isle of Skye ferries and a bicycle as transport.

Brown's 1974 journey was documented in the book Hamish’s Mountain Walk, the book won an award from the Scottish Arts Council. He followed his Munros walk with the longest trip over the English, Irish and Welsh peaks, told in the book Hamish’s Groats End Walk. Brown also thought up the Ultimate Challenge (now called the TGO Challenge, after The Great Outdoors Magazine, not to be confused with the Australian series, which sponsors and organises the event), a fortnight-long endurance walk from coast-to-coast across Scotland – the book Scotland Coast To Coast is an account of a typical Challenge walk. Great Walking Adventure covered some of his more distant treks to Corsica, Norway, the Andes, Atlas and Himalayas.

He has continued to write books and contribute to outdoor magazines. He has written or edited over forty books and written numerous articles, many of which have appeared in The Scotsman and the Evening News and a selection of these were published in the book Travels. He has also edited two poetry books: Poems of the Scottish Hills and the huge Speak to the Hills besides a volume of his own poems Time Gentlemen. Two of Brown's best known books about the Scottish Highlands, Hamish's Mountain Walk and Climbing The Corbetts were released as a compendium in 1996 by the publishers Baton Wicks.

In 1997, Brown received an Honorary Degree of Doctor of Letters from the University of St Andrews for his contribution to mountain writing and poetry. In 2000, he was made an MBE and a fellow of the Royal Scottish Geographical Society. In May 2007, he was awarded an honorary degree from the Open University as Doctor of the University.

Brown did a lot of his walking with his pet Shetland Sheepdogs, firstly Kitchy and then Storm. Both climbed hundreds of mountains in his company, including completed rounds of Munros, the former dog credited as the first to achieve this feat.

For many years Brown lived in Kinghorn in Fife and now lives in Burntisland. He spends several months every year in Morocco, a country very close to his heart; having first visited there in 1965 and has returned annually ever since to walk in the Atlas Mountains. In 2006, he released the book The Mountains Look on Marrakech an account of a 90-day end to end trek of the Atlas Mountains. In 2008, Brown took a break from writing books on walking when he released The Scottish Graveyard Miscellany, a book about the design and art of gravestones throughout Scotland.

In 2024 Hamish Brown announced that his final book would be published on March 24. In the book “Walking Borders: In Fife and in Fancies”, Hamish walks the inland border of Fife (his native county) from Kincardine to Newburgh during the COVID-19 lockdown. On Sunday June 16, 2024 Hamish took part in the Forth Bridge Abseil an event to raise funds for the charity Chest Heart & Stroke Scotland and also to mark his 90th birthday.

== Bibliography ==
- Hamish’s Mountain Walk, Paladin, 1978, ISBN 0-586-08332-4
- Hamish’s Groats End Walk, Paladin, 1981, ISBN 0-586-08426-6
- Eye to the Hills: Poems, Pettycur Publishing, 1982, ISBN 0-9508089-0-3 (With James McMillan)
- Poems of the Scottish Hills, Elsevier, 1982, ISBN 0-08-028477-9
- Time Gentlemen (Some Collected Poems), Mercat Press, 1983, ISBN 0-08-030375-7
- Five Bird Stories, Pettycur Publishing, 1984, ISBN 0-9508089-1-1
- Speak to the Hills, Anthology of 20th Century British and Irish Mountain Poetry, Aberdeen University, 1985, ISBN 0-08-030406-0 (Edited with Martyn Berry)
- The Great Walking Adventure, Oxford Illustrated Press, 1986, ISBN 0-946609-12-8
- Travels, Scotman Publications, 1986, ISBN 0-902670-03-4
- The Island of Rhum, A Guide for Walkers, Climbers and Visitors, Cicerone Press, 1988, ISBN 1-85284-002-1
- Climbing The Corbetts, Victor Gollancz, 1988, ISBN 0-575-04378-4
- Hamish Brown’s Scotland, Mercat Press, 1988, ISBN 0-08-036391-1
- Scotland Coast To Coast, Patrick Stephens, 1990, ISBN 1-85260-229-5
- Walking The Summits of Somerset and Avon, Pat, 1991, ISBN 1-85260-365-8
- Fort William And Glen Coe Walks, Jarrold Publishing, 1992, ISBN 0-7117-0571-2
- Great Walks: Scotland, New Orchard, 1992, ISBN 1-872226-56-6 (With Rennie McOwan, and Richard Mearns)
- From The Pennines to the Highlands, House of Lochar, 1992, ISBN 1-874027-37-4
- The Bothy Brew, Luath Press, 1993, ISBN 0-946487-26-X
- The Last Hundred, Munros, Beards and a Dog, Mainstream Publishing, 1994, ISBN 1-85158-607-5
- The Fife Coast, Mainstream Publishing, 1994, ISBN 1-85158-608-3
- Exploring The Edinburgh To Glasgow Canals, Stationery Office, 1997, ISBN 0-11-495735-5
- Fife in Focus (Coastal Photographs), 1997, ISBN 1-869984-08-0
- 25 Walks: Skye and Kintail, Mercat Press, 2000, ISBN 1-84183-007-0
- Along The Fife Coastal Path, Mercat Press, 2004, ISBN 1-84183-057-7
- Fife: 25 Walks, Mercat Press, 2005, ISBN 1-84183-075-5
- Seton Gordon’s Scotland, Whittles Publishing, 2005, ISBN 1-904445-22-5
- The Mountains Look on Marrakech, Whittles Publishing, ISBN 1-870325-29-X
- The Scottish Mountains, Colin Baxter Photography, 2007, ISBN 1-84107-367-9 (With Alan Gordon)
- A Scottish Graveyard Miscellany: The Folk Art of Scotland's Graves, Birlinn Publishing, 2008, ISBN 1-84158-676-5
- Walking the Mull Hills, Brown & Whittaker, 2011, ISBN 9781904353157
- The Oldest Post Office in the World, Sandstone Press, 2012, ISBN 1-90520-795-6
- The High Atlas: Treks and climbs on Morocco's biggest and best mountains, Cicerone Press, 2012, ISBN 1-85284-671-2
- Three Men on the Way Way: A Story of Walking the West Highland Way, Whittles Publishing, 2013, ISBN 1849950873
- Tom Weir: An Anthology, Sandstone Press, 2013, ISBN 190873728X (Editor)
- Fantasies, Fables, Fibs and Frolics: Stories From The Heart of Scotland, Pettycur Publishing, 2014,
- Canals Across Scotland: Walking, Cycling, Boating, Visiting, Whittles Publishing, 2016, ISBN 9781849952200
- Walking the Song, Sandstone Press, 2017, ISBN 9781910985588
- East of West, West of East, Sandstone Press, 2018, ISBN 9781912240258
- Chasing the Dreams, Sandstone Press, 2019, ISBN 9781912240784
- Exploring the Fife Coastal Path: A Companion Guide, Barlinn Publishing, 2021, ISBN 9781780277288

Hamish Brown has also contributed to:

- Walker's Companion: Scotland, Ward Lock, 1994, ISBN 9780706372458
- Rough Guide to Morocco, Rough Guides, 2004, ISBN 1-84353-313-8
- Rough Guide to Scotland, Rough Guides, 2006, ISBN 1-84353-666-8
- Munros Tables, Scottish Mountaineering Trust, 1981 ISBN 978-0907521099
- The Corbetts And Other Scottish Hills, Scottish Mountaineering Trust, 1990, ISBN 0-907521-29-0
- The Munros, Scottish Mountaineering Trust, 1985, 0-907521-13-4
