= The Great Outdoors (magazine) =

The Great Outdoors (formerly TGO) is a British monthly consumer magazine focused on hillwalking and backpacking, first published in 1978 (47 years ago). It was edited for many years by Cameron McNeish. Chris Townsend and Jim Perrin are among many regular and long-term contributors to the magazine.

The Great Outdoors was published by Newquest until October 2015, when it was sold to Kelsey Media. Kelsey Media's headquarters are based in Cudham, Kent.

The Great Outdoors is the main sponsor of the TGO Challenge, an annual coast-to-coast backpacking event in Scotland, invented by Hamish Brown and originally called the Ultimate Challenge.
