= Glen Finnan =

Valley in Highland, Scotland

Geography
- Location: Northwest Highlands
- Country: Scotland
- State: Highland
- District: Lochaber
- Coordinates: 56°54′05″N 5°25′56″W
- Topo map: OS Landranger 40
- River: River Finnan
- Interactive map of Glen Finnan

Glen Finnan is a glen in Lochaber, Highland, Scotland, located at the foot of Streap in the Northwest Highlands mountain range. The River Finnan, which flows into Loch Shiel, flows the entire length of the glen. The Sgùrr Thuilm mountain stands at the head of Glen Finnan.
