= Charles Pilkington (mountaineer) =

English alpinist and colliery engineer (1850-1918)

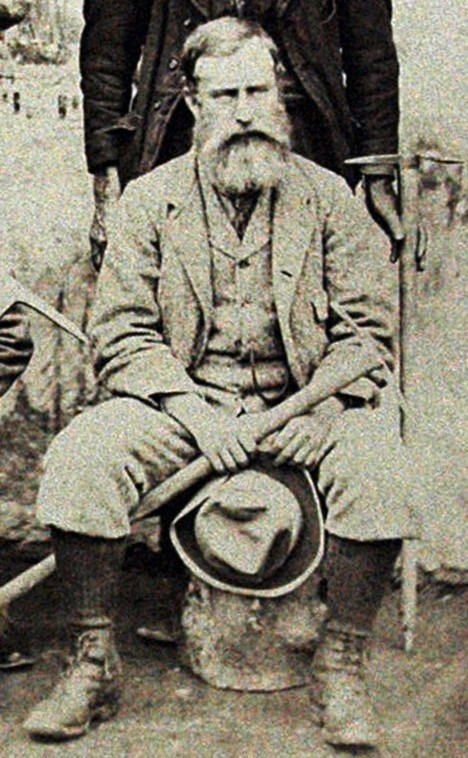
- Charles Pilkington in 1877
- Born: 18 August 1850; St Helens, Merseyside, England
- Died: 23 December 1918 (aged 68); Prestwich, Lancashire, England
- Occupation: Colliery engineer
- Relatives: Richard Pilkington (MP) (brother) Richard Evans (1778–1864) (grandfather)

Charles Pilkington (1850–1918) was a British colliery engineer and mountaineer. In the Alps he was a pioneer of mountaineering without guides and made the first ascent of a number of peaks and several significant first guideless ascents. In the UK he made the first ascent of Sgùrr Dearg's Inaccessible Pinnacle on the Isle of Skye.

== Biography ==
Pilkington was born in St Helens on 18 August 1850, the son of Richard Pilkington (1795–1869) and his wife Anne (1812–1883), née Evans. In 1829 Richard Pilkington went into partnership with his brother, William (1800–1872), who had joined the St. Helens Crown Glass Company in 1826 as a silent partner before assuming control of that company in 1828, when Richard joined him they reformed the company as Pilkington Brothers which went on to develop into the FTSE listed Pilkington glass-manufacturing company.

One of Charles Pilkington's younger brothers, Lawrence (1855–1941) was also a prominent mountaineer and one of his elder brothers was the conservative MP Richard Pilkington (1841–1908).

Charles Pilkington made his living as a colliery engineer, he married Mabel Fielden in 1884. Two of their sons, Edward Fielden (1885–1975) and Hugh Brocklehurst (1886–1915) attended Winchester and Trinity College, Cambridge. Both of them climbed with Charles in the alps and were original members of the Cambridge University Mountaineering Club when it was founded during the winter months of 1905-1906. Hugh was killed in action at Gallipoli in the Great War and Edward Fielden later became a director of two of the companies that his father had been involved with, the Pilkington Lancastrian Pottery and Tile Company and Manchester Collieries (into which Clifton and Kersley Coal Company had been subsumed), he was awarded an OBE in the 1957 New Year Honours.

== Business ==
Soon after leaving school Pilkington started working for Haydock Collieries, which were part of his grandfather's firm of Richard Evans & Sons (his mother Anne was the eldest daughter of Richard Evans (1778–1864)). Initially he worked as a fitter in the mechanics' shops where much of the machinery was made and repaired, this was the first step in his training as a colliery engineer.

In June 1878 an explosion took place in Wood Pit, one of the Haydock mines, the Wood Pit disaster involved the loss of around 200 men. At the time Charles Pilkington was an assistant surveyor on the site and he was one of the first to go down the pit after the explosion, he was involved in clearing the roadways and trying to improve the ventilation so that they could access the workings and get the bodies out and for the next month he was in charge of one of the shifts working to restore the mine and complete the recovery of the bodies.

He left Haydock in 1888 to join his brothers Edward and Alfred who had established the Clifton and Kersley Coal Company in 1867 and were later joined by their younger brother Lawrence as the colliery manager. Charles became a director of the company, "he understood the Lancashire miner and had real sympathy with his difficulties and dangers as well as a thorough knowledge of the conditions of the mining industry" and he was involved in training men for rescue work and the welfare of the colliers. In 1903 he was President of the Lancashire and Cheshire Coal Owners Association.

In 1889 the Clifton and Kersley Coal Company sank two pit shafts in order to work the coal seams close to the Pendleton Fault. Because of flooding the work was abandoned, but in the process good quality red marl clay had been discovered. Using the marl to make glazed bricks was considered but it was found to be more suitable for decorative glazed tiles so, in 1891, Charles Pilkington and his younger brother Lawrence established the Pilkington Lancastrian Pottery and Tile Company at Clifton Junction near Manchester. Although the two brothers owned the company and Lawrence was the company chairman, its day-to-day management was in the hands of William Burton and his brother Joseph. In the early years of the 20th century the company became famous for its Lancastrian Lustre ware which was sold at Tiffany’s in New York and earned them a Royal Warrant.

== UK climbing ==
Pilkington climbed and walked regularly in the Lake District in the 1870s with Lawrence, George Eustace Hulton, Frederick Gardiner (who later married Pilkington's cousin, Alice Evans) and others, with Gardiner he had "been in the habit of wandering among the hills of Cumberland and Westmoreland at all periods of the year, but more especially in the winter season." Pilkington and his brother were keen long distance walkers, covering distances up to 50 miles over the Lakeland fells in 24 hrs, a fore-runner to the Bob Graham Round.

Pilkington "was among the first to call attention to the island of Skye as a field for the climber quite unrivalled in Britain and to the Coolin Hills as yet hardly known". Pilkington made his first visit to Skye in 1872, he was an enthusiastic angler, "an admirable salmon and trout fisher and an equally good shot and deer stalker", and his early visits were to fish and shoot, it wasn't until 1880 that he undertook any significant mountaineering on the island.

He and his brother made the first ascent of Pinnacle Ridge on Skye's Sgùrr nan Gillean on 18 August 1880, which is now regarded as '3 star' classic. He also made the first ascent of Sgùrr Dearg's Inaccessible Pinnacle with his brother during the same visit.

In 1887 the Charles Pilkington was in the Skye Cuillin again and, with James Heelis, Horace Walker and the local mountain guide John MacKenzie, they made the first ascents of a number of unclimbed peaks in the Cuillin these included Clach Glas and Sgurr na h-Uamha and two unnamed peaks, one of these was then known simply as the north-east peak of Sgùrr Alasdair, they coined the name Sgùrr Theàrlaich, which is the Gaelic for Charlie's Peak, and that name is used to this day. The other peak they named as Sgùrr MhicChoinnich, which is the Gaelic for Mackenzie's Peak, after John MacKenzie, and that name has also been in regular use since then.

Pilkington not only climbed with Walker in the Alps and Skye, in 1892 he and Walker were in the NW Highlands of Scotland where they "forced their way up the steep vegetation-covered precipices of the Grey Castle" (Caisteal Liath) which forms the western buttress of Suilven.

Pilkington was made an Honorary member of the Fell & Rock Climbing Club when it was founded in 1907. He was also President of Rucksack Club for 1906/08 and he contributed the chapter "Hill Climbing in the British Isles" to the Mountaineering volume in the Badminton library.

== Alpinism ==
Charles and his brother Lawrence "were among the more important of the guideless Alpine climbers of the 1870s" and they "made it into a respectable pursuit", "where difficulty, and possibly its accompanying danger, had to be met, he was the man to extricate his party well and safely".

Charles Pilkington's first Swiss peak, in 1872, was the Wetterhorn after that he made a couple of further visits, along with Lawrence, before he joined forces with Frederick Gardiner in 1876. In 1878 Charles and Lawrence Pilkington, with Gardiner started mountaineering in the alps without guides, they were later credited as "the first to show that the amateur mountaineer could safely undertake, without professional assistance, expeditions of the very first rank". Their first foray was to the Dauphiné Alps, amongst the successes of that trip were the first guideless ascent of the Barre des Écrins and the first ascent of Pointe des Arcas. The trio made further guideless alpine ascents during the summers of 1879 and 1881, revisiting the Dauphiné and climbing in the Bernese Oberland and the Pennine Alps.

1881 was the final season that the Pilkingtons climbed with Gardiner, it was also the year that Gardiner married their cousin Alice Evans. The Pilkingtons continued to make significant alpine ascents without guides and in 1882, with George Eustace Hulton, they made the first guideless ascent of Piz Kesch, Piz Roseg & Monte Disgrazia (climbing Disgrazia by a new route via NE arete).

In later years Charles and his brother often climbed with Charles Hopkinson (the brother of Edward Hopkinson), with Horace Walker and his daughter Lucy, with his own sons and with his wife (from 1890).

Pilkington "knew the alps from end to end, from the Dauphiné to the Dolomites" and he carried out a large number of other climbs in the Alps, Mumm's Alpine Register has a more comprehensive record of his alpine activities, from his first visit to Switzerland in 1872 through to 1911.

Pilkington contributed the chapter "Climbing without Guides" to the Mountaineering volume in the Badminton library and he was president of the Alpine Club from 1896 to 1898.

== Significant ascents ==
- 1878 - First ascent of Pointe des Arcas with Frederick Gardiner and Lawrence Pilkington (12 July)
- 1878 - First guideless ascent of the Barre des Écrins with Frederick Gardiner and Lawrence Pilkington (19 July)
- 1879 - First guideless ascent of La Meije with Frederick Gardiner and Lawrence Pilkington (25 July)
- 1881 - First guideless ascent of the Jungfrau with Frederick Gardiner and Lawrence Pilkington (30 July)
- 1881 - First guideless ascent of the Finsteraarhorn with Frederick Gardiner and Lawrence Pilkington
- 1882 - First guideless ascent of Piz Kesch with Lawrence Pilkington and Eustace Hulton
- 1882 - First guideless ascent of Piz Roseg with Lawrence Pilkington and Eustace Hulton (7 August 1882)
- 1882 - First guideless ascent of Monte Disgrazia, climbed by a new route via NE arete, with Lawrence Pilkington and Eustace Hulton (12 August 1882)
