= Sir Hugh Munro, 4th Baronet =

Scottish mountaineer

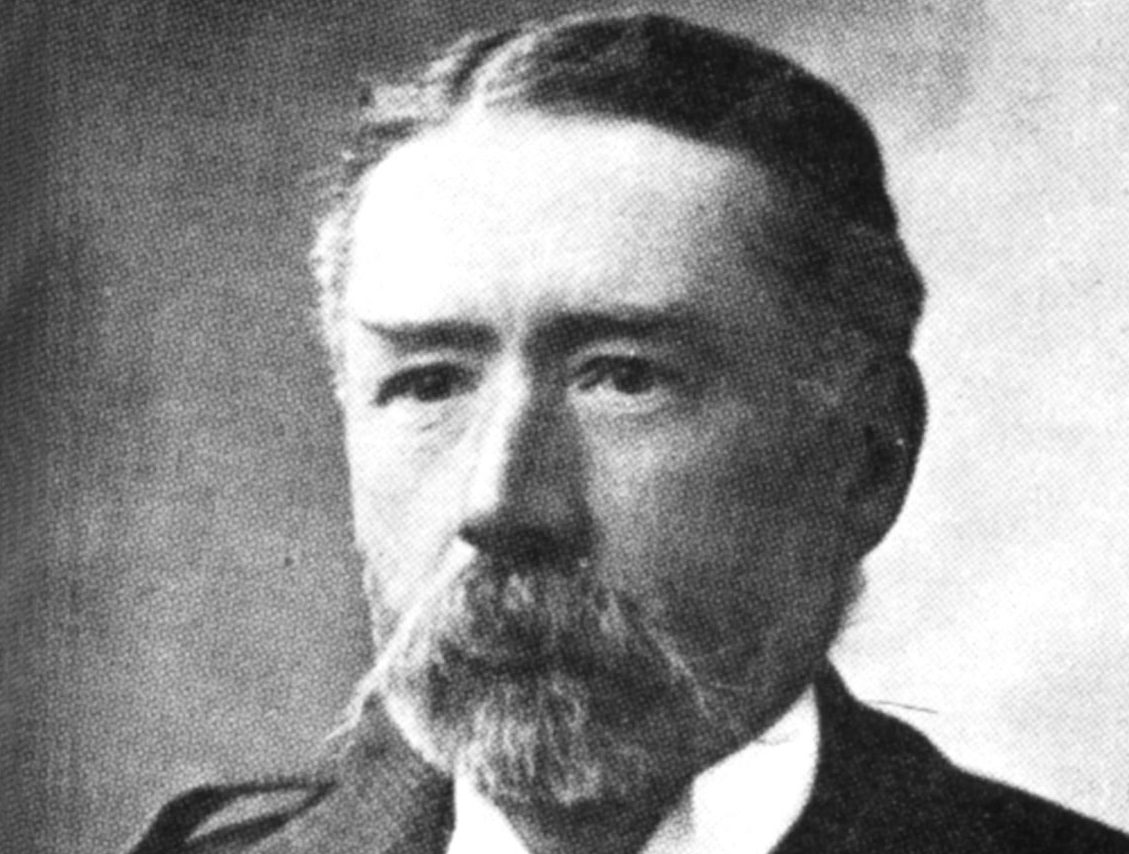
Sir Hugh Munro, 4th Baronet

Sir Hugh Thomas Munro, 4th Baronet (16 October 1856 – 19 March 1919), was a British mountaineer best known for his list of mountains in Scotland over 3,000 feet (914.4 m), known as Munros. Born in London, Munro was the fifth child of Sir Campbell Munro, 3rd Baronet, and also a grandson of Major-General Sir Thomas Munro, 1st Baronet of Lindertis.

== Biography ==
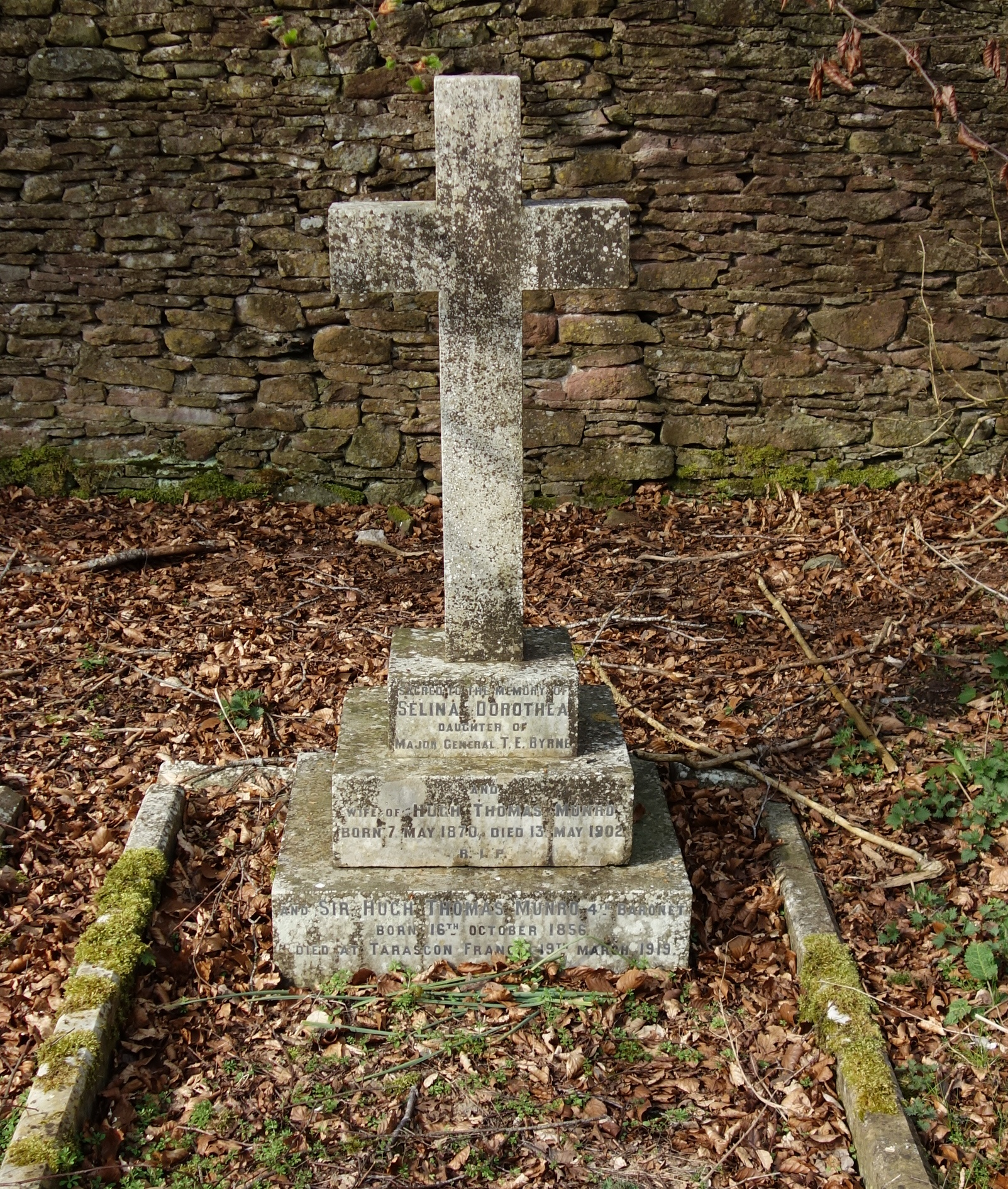
The grave of Sir Hugh Munro, Lindertis, Kirriemuir.

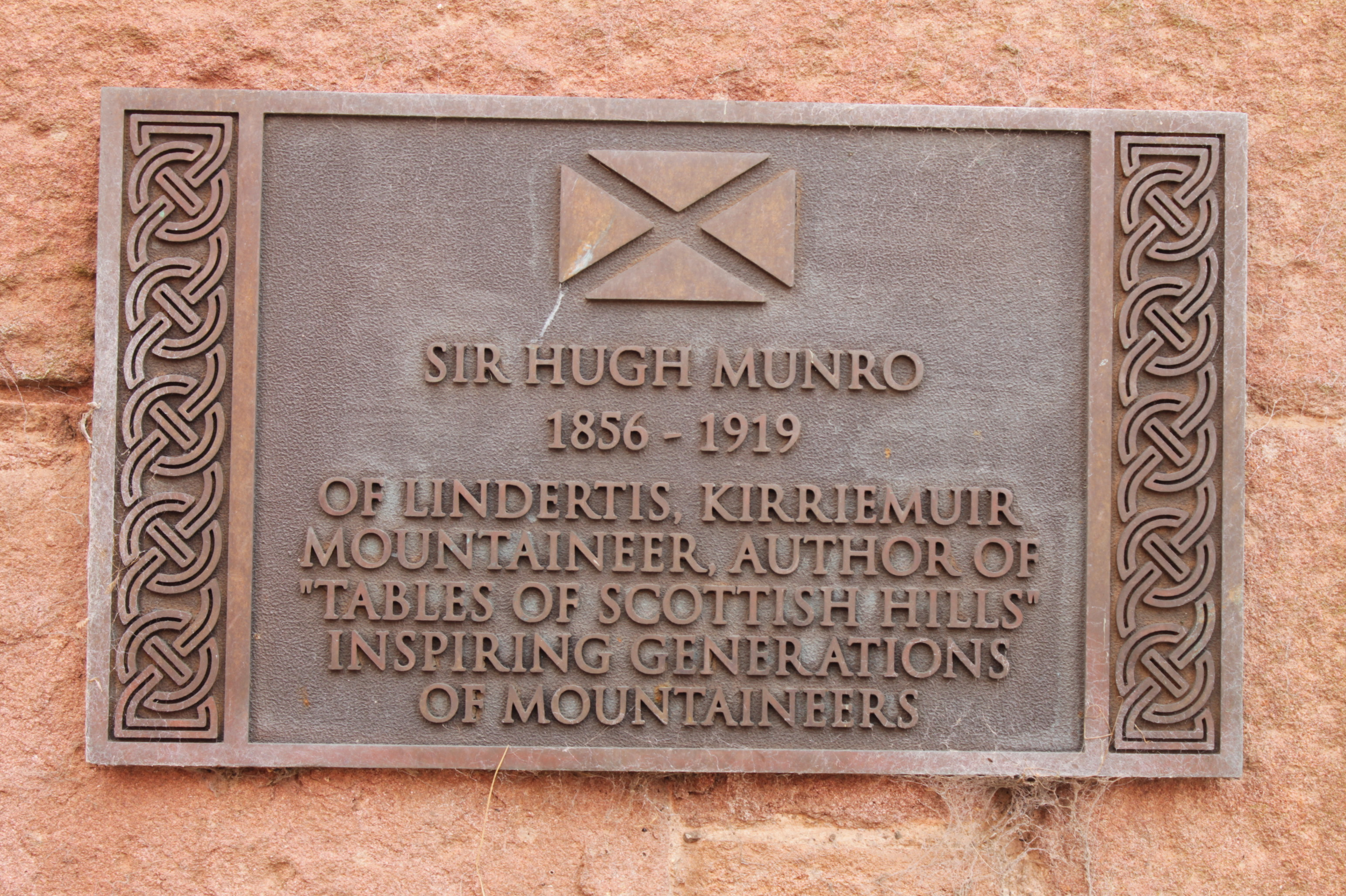
Plaque to Sir Hugh Munro in Kirriemuir

Munro was born on 16 October 1856 in London, but was brought up in Scotland on the family estate of Lindertis near Kirriemuir in Angus. He was an avid hillwalker, and was a founder member of the Scottish Mountaineering Club in 1889. His list of 3,000-foot mountains 1891 was published in the 6th issue of the Scottish Mountaineering Club Journal in 1891. This list caused much surprise in mountaineering circles, as until his list was produced many thought that the number of mountains exceeding this height was around 30, rather than the nearly 300 that he listed. These mountains are now known as Munros and it is a popular hobby to attempt to climb them all.

Hugh Munro never completed his own list. Of his original list he failed to climb one mountain in the Cairngorms (Carn Cloich-Mhuillin), which he was saving to be his last. At the time of his death he had produced a revised version of the list, adding Carn an Fhidhleir, which he had also yet to climb. Sir Hugh is often said to have missed out the Inaccessible Pinnacle (An Stac) of Sgùrr Dearg, on the Isle of Skye, a peak which there is no record of his having climbed. However, the "In Pinn" was not included in either of the lists produced during his lifetime, despite being several feet higher than Sgurr Dearg, which was included. The first person to achieve the feat of climbing all of the mountains on Munro's list is generally regarded as being the Rev. A. E. Robertson in 1901. However Robertson is known not to have climbed all of the peaks either, as he did not climb The Inaccessible Pinnacle or reach the summit of Ben Wyvis.

In addition to his mountaineering interests, Munro was well travelled and made trips to Europe, Asia, North America and Africa. He was too old at 58 for military service during World War I but did volunteer work with the Red Cross and cared for injured soldiers in Malta in 1915. After a spell of illness, he rejoined the Red Cross, running a canteen for Allied forces near the front line in France. He died on 19 March 1919 in Tarascon in southern France aged 62, during the post-war influenza pandemic. He is buried on the family estate of Lindertis near Kirriemuir in Angus.

== See also ==
- Munro, mountain class created by Munro
- Munro Baronets, history of the clan
- List of Munro mountains in Scotland, list of all 282 Munros and 227 Munro Tops in Scotland
- List of Munros in Scotland by Section, list arranged by Section as appearing in Munro's Tables

Baronetage of the United Kingdom
Preceded by Campbell Munro	Baronet (of Lindertis); 1913–1919	Succeeded by Thomas Munro
