= Sgùrr a' Ghreadaidh =

Mountain in Scotland

- Sgùrr a’ Ghreadhaich
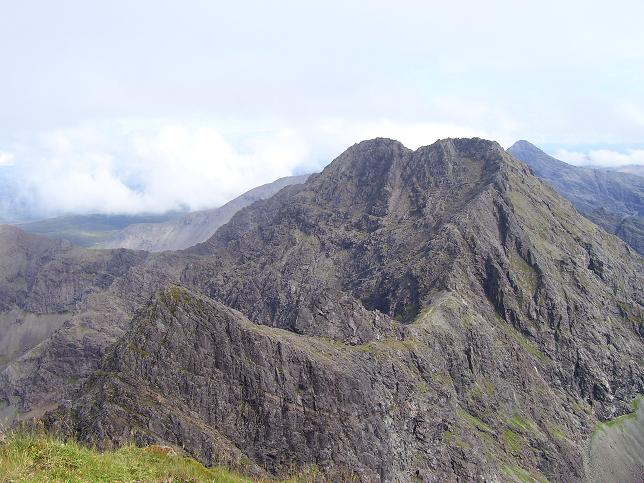

Highest point
- Elevation: 973 m (3,192 ft)
- Prominence: 124 m (407 ft)
- Listing: Munro
- Coordinates: 57°13′41″N 6°14′06″W

Naming
- English translation: peak of torment
- Language of name: Gaelic
- Pronunciation: Scottish Gaelic: [ˈs̪kuːrˠ ə ˈɣɾet̪ɪ]

Geography
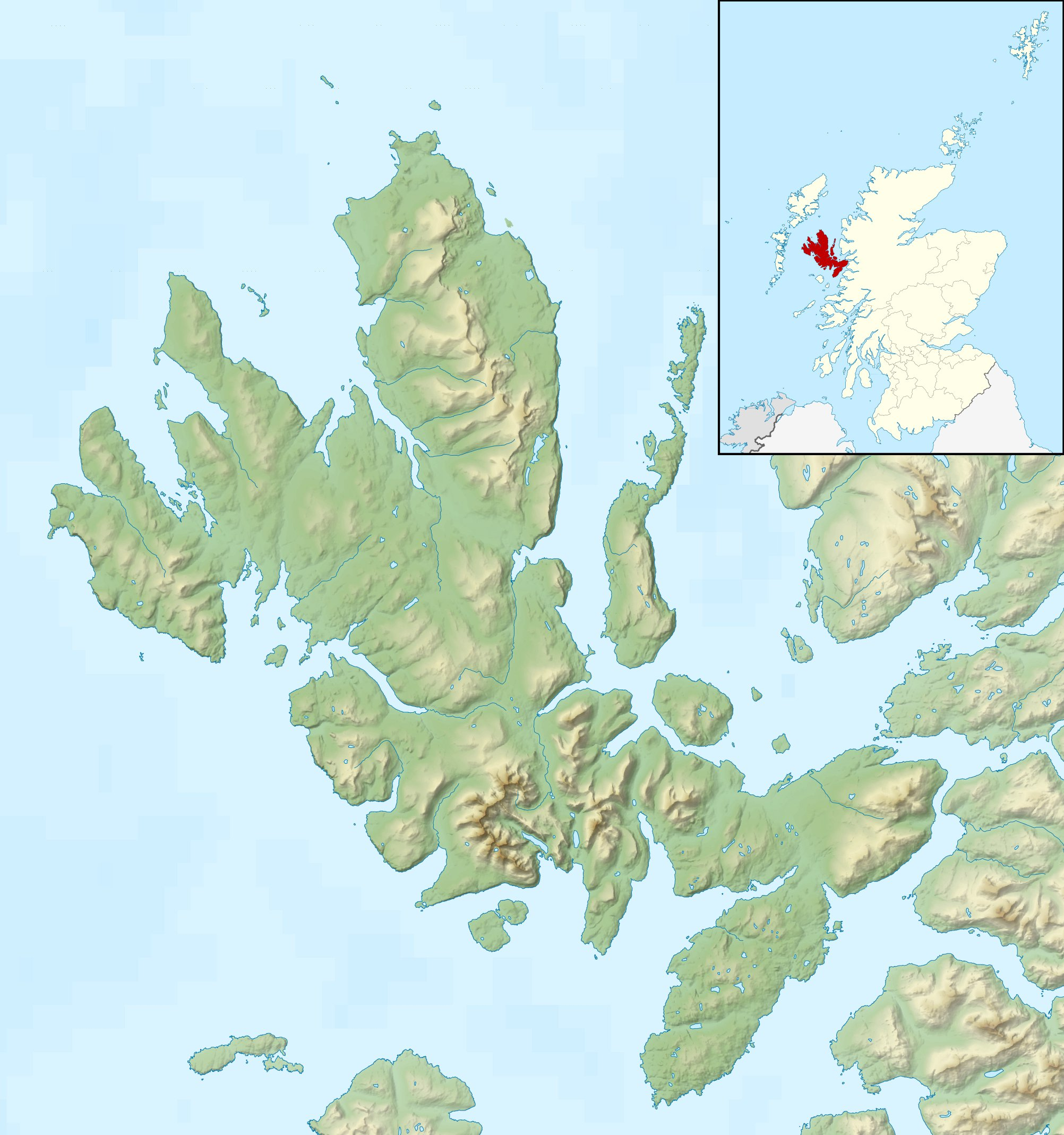
- Location within Isle of Skye
- Location: Skye, Scotland
- Parent range: Cuillin
- OS grid: NG445232
- Topo map: OS Landranger 32

Climbing
- First ascent: 1870, John Mackenzie and William Newton Tribe
- Easiest route: Scramble

Sgùrr a' Ghreadaidh (Scottish Gaelic: Sgùrr a’ Ghreadhaich, "peak of torment") is the highest peak on the northern half of the Black Cuillin ridge on the Isle of Skye in Scotland. Like the rest of the range it is composed of gabbro, a rock that provides good grip for mountaineering.

This is one of the harder main Black Cuillin peaks to ascend. The simplest route ascends via the col of An Dorus (the Door), most easily reached from Glen Brittle; however, the immediate exit from An Dorus is a Grade 3 scramble and there is sustained scrambling of a lower grade on the north ridge leading to the summit. The south ridge leading towards Sgùrr Thormaid is also Grade 3, with few opportunities to descend safely for some considerable distance. The mountain has two summits, separated by a knife-edged arete. At the time of the first ascent, John MacKenzie was aged just 14. He had earlier repeated the ascent of Sgùrr nan Gillean aged 10. Mackenzie became the first British mountain guide and perhaps the most prolific of the pioneers of mountaineering in the Cuillin.
