= John MacKenzie (mountain guide) =

Gaelic mountain guide

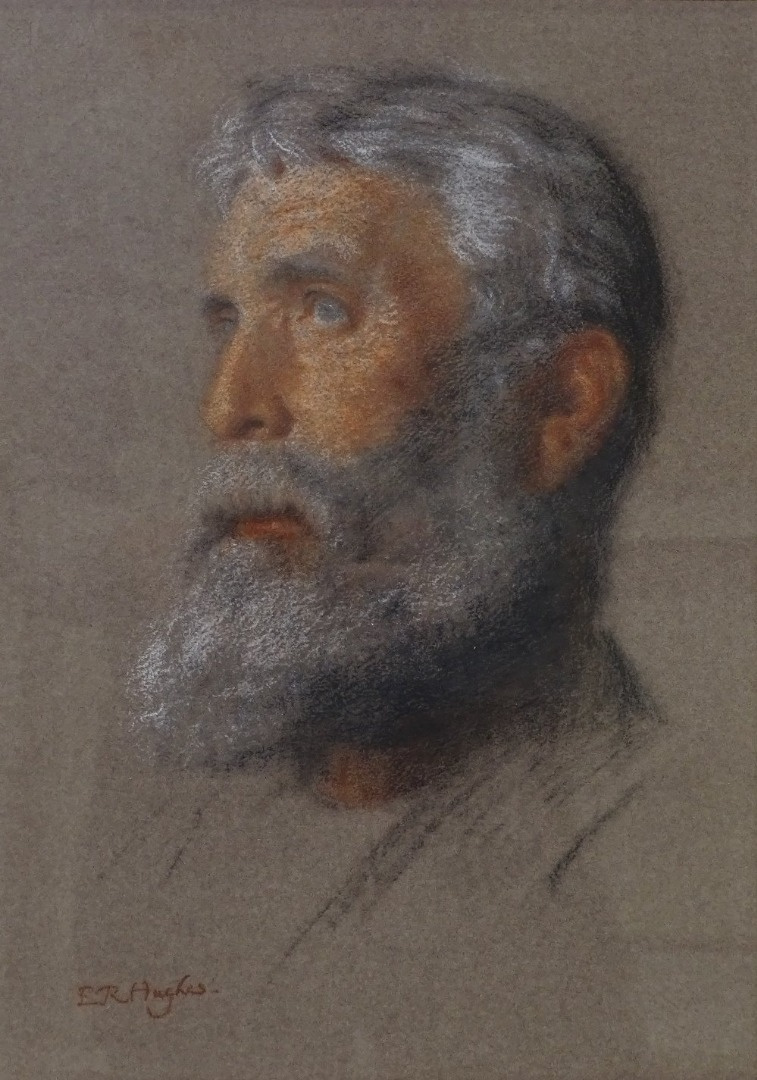
- Portrait of John Mackenzie by Edward Robert Hughes

Personal information
- Nationality: Scottish
- Born: 1857 Skye
- Died: 1933 (aged 76–77) Skye
- Occupations: mountain guide; ghillie; crofter

Climbing career
- Major ascents: Am Basteir; Sgùrr Dubh; Sgùrr Thearlaich; Sgùrr MhicChoinnich

John Morton MacKenzie (1856–1933) was a Gaelic speaking crofter from Sconser on the Island of Skye and Britain's first professional mountain guide.

== Climbing career ==
As a teenager MacKenzie worked as a pony man for Sligachan Hotel helping tourists to visit Loch Coruisk. It is believed that he first climbed Sgùrr nan Gillean at the age of ten. At 14 he made the first known ascent of Sgùrr a' Ghreadaidh with a Mr Tribe. 1887 was a productive year for MacKenzie. He is credited with the first ascent of Am Basteir with the Irish climber Henry Hart with whom he traversed most of the main ridge in two days and made the first traverse of what is now called Collie's ledge on Sgùrr MhicChoinnich. Recently there has been a tendency to call this feature Hart's Ledge He was involved in the second ascent of the steep western side of the Inaccessible Pinnacle followed by first ascents (with Charles Pilkington, James Heelis and Horace Walker) of Sgùrr Thearlaich and Sgùrr Mhic Choinnich, a peak which was later named after him; its name being Gaelic for MacKenzie's Peak.

When he met Norman Collie in 1886, and provided him with information on the route up Sgùrr nan Gillean, he was already an established guide. Thereafter he regularly climbed with Collie, exploring the remote, wild and largely unmapped Skye Cuillin. A strong bond of friendship developed between them. Neither seems to have been unduly interested in making money. They shared an urge to climb and explore and, as they grew older, their mutual love of fishing became increasingly important. Collie seems to have been the partner who could envisage the climbing line, while MacKenzie was normally the lead climber. Friendships across class boundaries were relatively uncommon at this time and it may have helped that both men were possessed of a deep sense of humanity.

The list of their achievements together is impressive. In 1891 they succeeded in crossing the Tearlach- Dubh gap, arguably technically the most difficult problem on the main ridge. In 1896 they made the first ascent of the outlying Sgùrr Coir’ an Lochain, probably the last summit in Britain to be climbed. Collie's 1899 discovery of the Cioch, a remarkable rock feature on the Coire Lagan flank of Sron na Ciche was followed by his first ascent of it with MacKenzie in 1906. Since then this Skye landmark has featured in movies such as ‘’Highlander’’. In the 1997 BBC TV series on Scottish climbing, The Edge, Collie and MacKenzie's exploits were re-enacted by Alan Kimber (Collie) and John Lyall (MacKenzie)

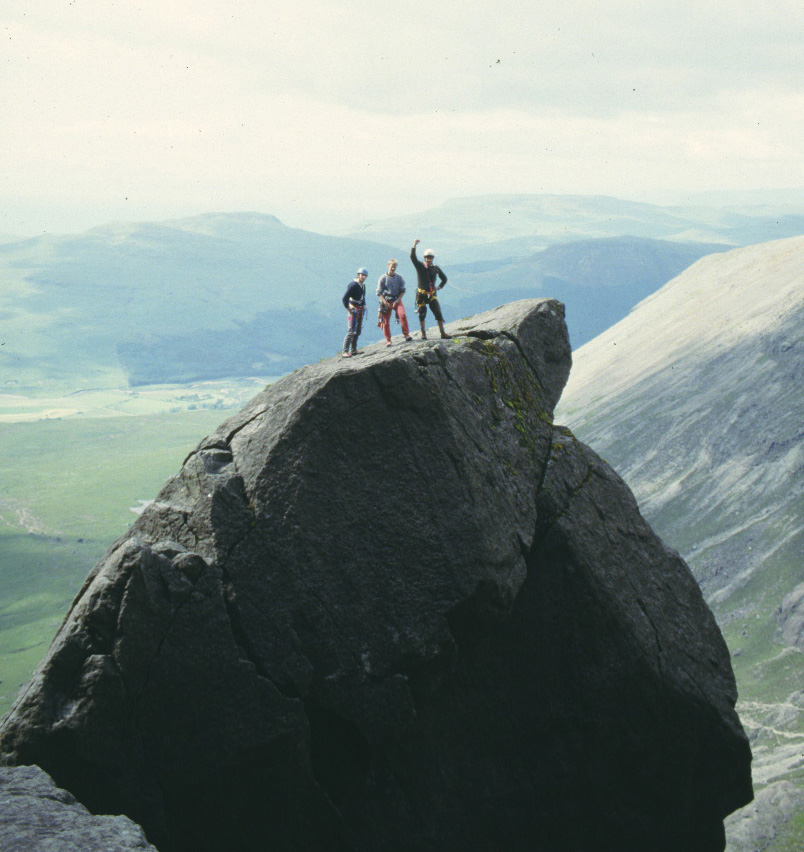
Climbers on the Cioch, Isle of Skye

== Character ==
Ken Crocket quotes Sheriff G.D. Valentine “The stalker’s cap, the loose jacket and the knickerbockers, which he wore suited the man; they seemed to grow out of him. He had the characteristics of the Highlander; the courtesy joined to self respect that are the heritage of the clans. His accent to the end smacked of the Gaelic speaker. His features were strong and embrowned by weather. He wore the old style of short beard, whiskers and moustache. Always alert, always cheerful, he was the perfect companion, but it was when the mist came swirling down on the wet rocks that his true worth was known.” Crocket notes that in his career MacKenzie must have guided thousands of tourists and climbers without one recorded accident, a remarkable achievement for anyone working in such an unforgiving environment, arguably Britain's most challenging range of hills. His achievements were recognised by the Alpine Club who made him something akin to an honorary member and mailed him their journal. MacKenzie never climbed outside Scotland.

== Family life ==
Like Collie, John MacKenzie never married; living with two spinster sisters, a niece and a nephew on his croft where he built a house in 1912 from his income from guiding.

== Death ==
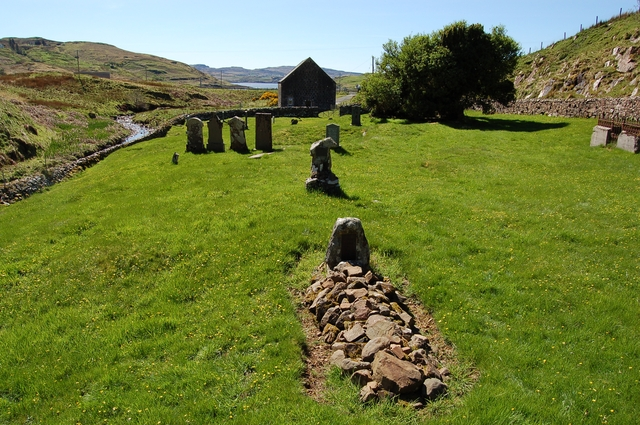
The graves of Norman Collie (foreground), with John Mackenzie's immediately behind. Bracadale Free Church, Struan

John MacKenzie died in 1933 at the age of 76. He is buried in the grave yard of Bracadale Free Church at Struan by Loch Harport on the west side of the island. Norman Collie wrote his obituary in the Scottish Mountaineering Club Journal. Collie himself died in 1942 and, in keeping with his wishes, was buried beside his great friend.

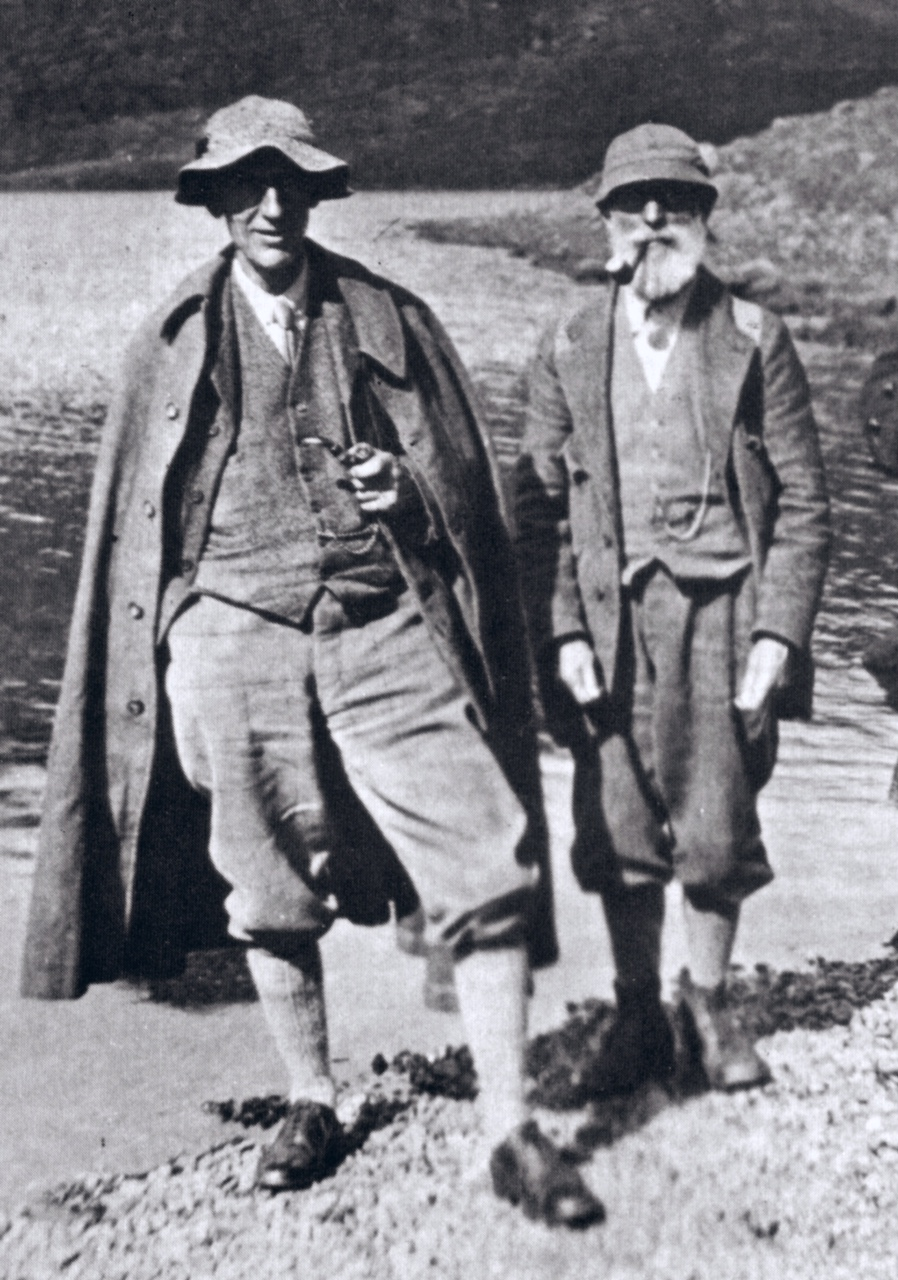
Norman Collie and John MacKenzie as old men

== Memorial ==
A ten-year project to raise £320,000 of funding to erect a bronze statue and memorial to John MacKenzie and Norman Collie on Skye was expected to be realised in 2017. Designed by sculptor, Stephen Tinney, it was positioned and unveiled on a rocky knoll opposite the Sligachan Hotel, overlooking the Cuillin Hills in Sept 2020.

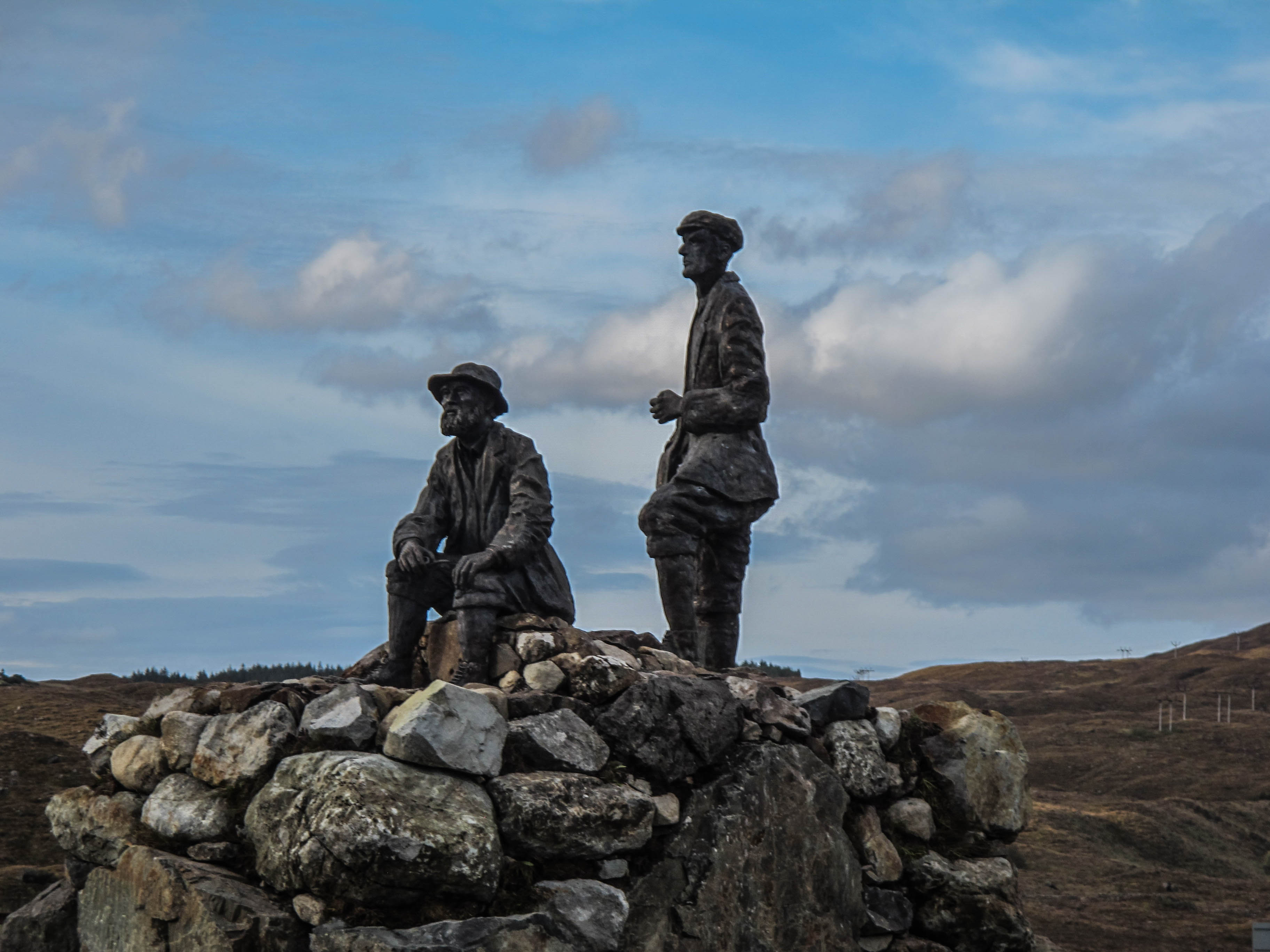
Bronze statue of John Mackenzie and Norman Collie at Sligachan, Island of Skye

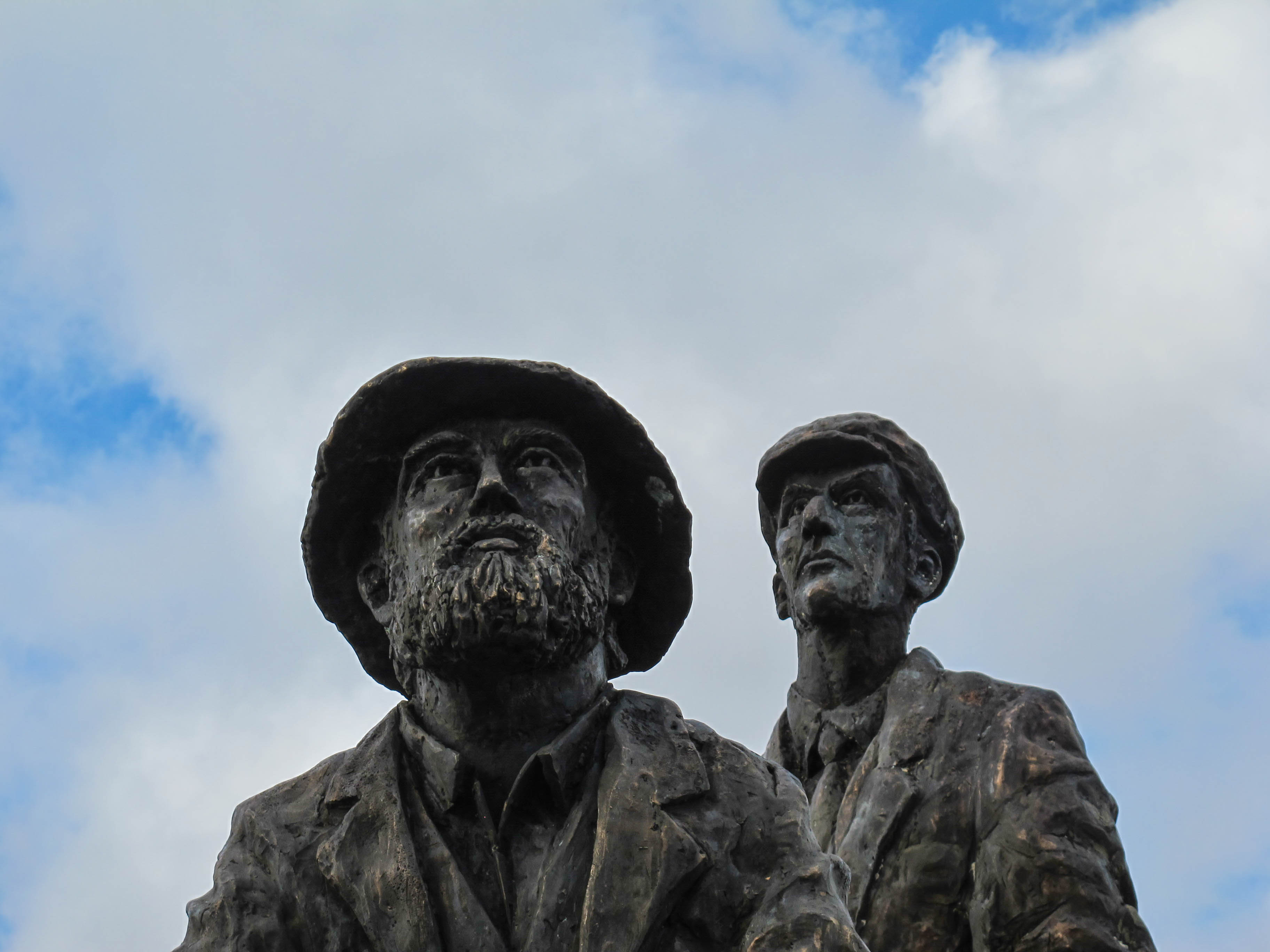
Head of John MacKenzie (lef) and Norman Collie

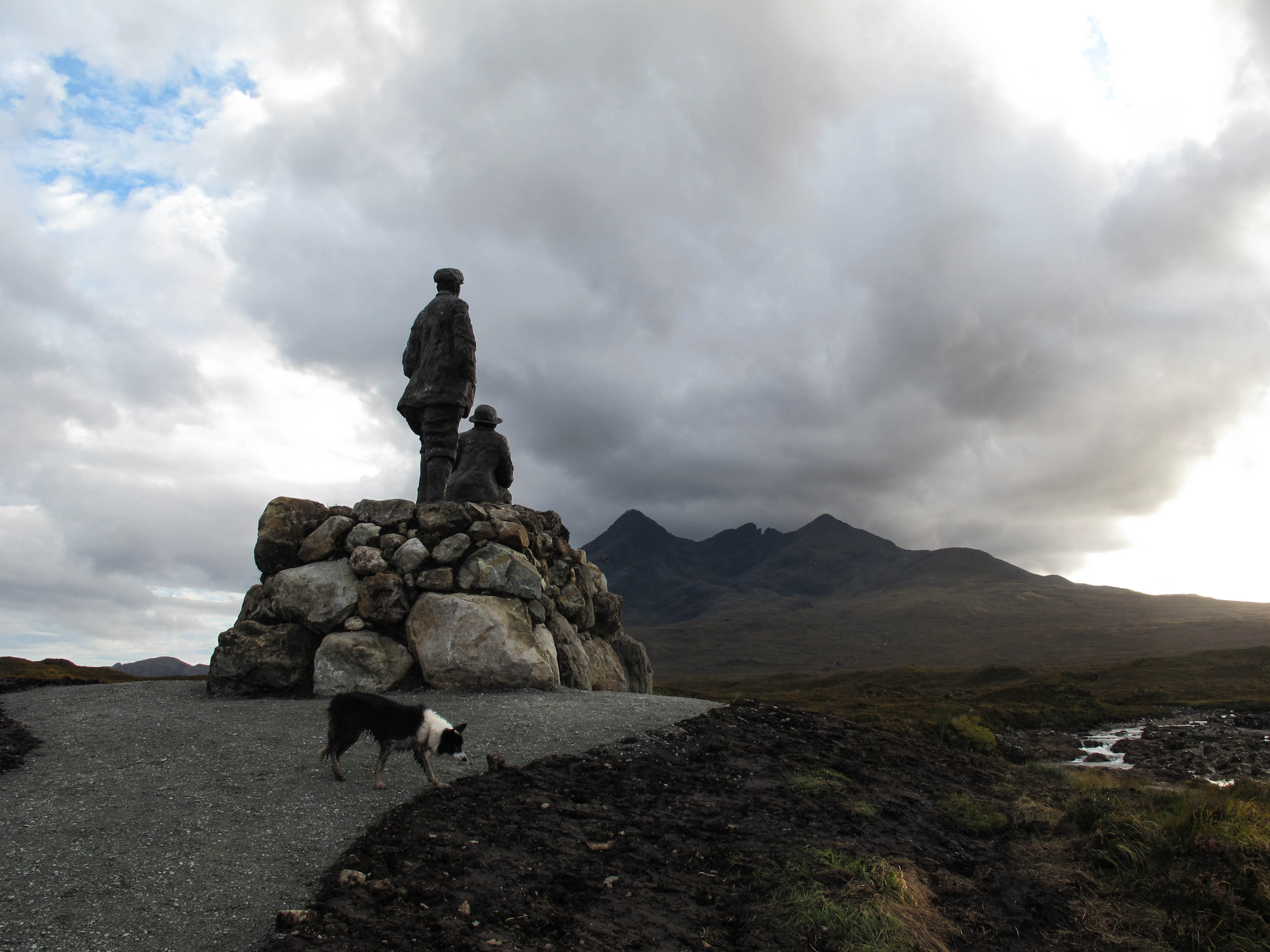
MacKenzie and Collie looking towards Sgùrr nan Gillean
