= Allt a' Chaol Ghlinne =

River in Highland, Scotland

Coordinates: 56.904°N 5.432°W

Allt a' Chaol Ghlinne—also spelled Allt a' Chaol-ghlinne—is a river in the Lochaber area of Highland, Scotland. Located in a glen (valley) within the Northwest Highlands of the Scottish Highlands, Allt a' Chaol Ghlinne is a tributary to the River Finnan, which itself flows into Loch Shiel.

== Etymology ==
Allt a' Chaol Ghlinne means "Burn of the Narrow Glen."

== Course ==
Rising near the Meall Coire na Saobhaidh mountain in the Northwest Highlands, Allt a' Chaol Ghlinne flows an easterly course, receiving its waters from a large drainage basin in the valley north of Sgùrr an Fhuarain Duibh. After curving southeast, Allt a' Chaol Ghlinne reaches Corryhully, where it flows into the River Finnan.
