= Chris Townsend (writer) =

British mountain walker and author (born 1949)

Chris Townsend (born 1949) is a hillwalker and author of over 20 books. He is also currently Hillwalking Ambassador for the British Mountaineering Council.

== Biography ==
Although Craig Caldwell was the first person to climb all of the Munros and Tops in one continuous journey, Townsend was the first to do so entirely on foot covering 1,700 miles (2,700 km) and 575,000 feet (170,000 m) of ascent over all 517 of the 3,000 ft (914 m) Scottish summits listed in Munro's Tables. He was also the first person to walk the length of the Canadian Rockies, a distance of 1,600 miles (2,500 km). Chris Townsend has also hiked the 2,600 mile (4200 km) Pacific Crest Trail, the 3,100 mile (5,000 km) Continental Divide Trail, from Land's End to John o' Groats in the UK (1,250 miles, 2,000 km), south–north through the Scandinavian mountains (1,300 miles, 2100 km), 1,000 miles (1,600 km) south–north through the Yukon Territory, the 800 mile (1,300 km) Arizona Trail, the 1,200 mile Pacific Northwest Trail and the 700 mile Scottish Watershed.

Townsend has been a long-term contributor to The Great Outdoors magazine, for whom he is currently the Gear Editor. His book The Backpacker's Handbook won the Outdoor Writer's Guild Award for Excellence in 1993. He is the co-author, with Annie Aggens, of the Encyclopedia of Outdoor & Wilderness Skills: The Ultimate A–Z Guide for The Adventurous.
