= Annie M. Aggens =

American writer

Annie M. Aggens (also known as Annie Aggens) is a polar expedition leader for Polar Explorers. She is one of only a few women who have led treks to both the North and South Poles.

In May 2008, she led an international team on a 25-day trek across the Greenland Ice Cap. She is also the co-author, with Chris Townsend, of the Encyclopedia of Outdoor & Wilderness Skills: The Ultimate A-Z Guide for The Adventurous. 2003. Ragged Mountain Press. ISBN 0-07-138406-5.

In 2006, she founded ICECAAP, an international consortium of polar explorers dedicated to preserving the polar environment.

== Sources ==
- Townsend, Chris, and Annie M Aggens. Encyclopedia of Outdoor & Wilderness Skills. Ragged Mountain Press/McGraw Hill, 2003.
