= Les Rouies =

Mountain in the French Alps

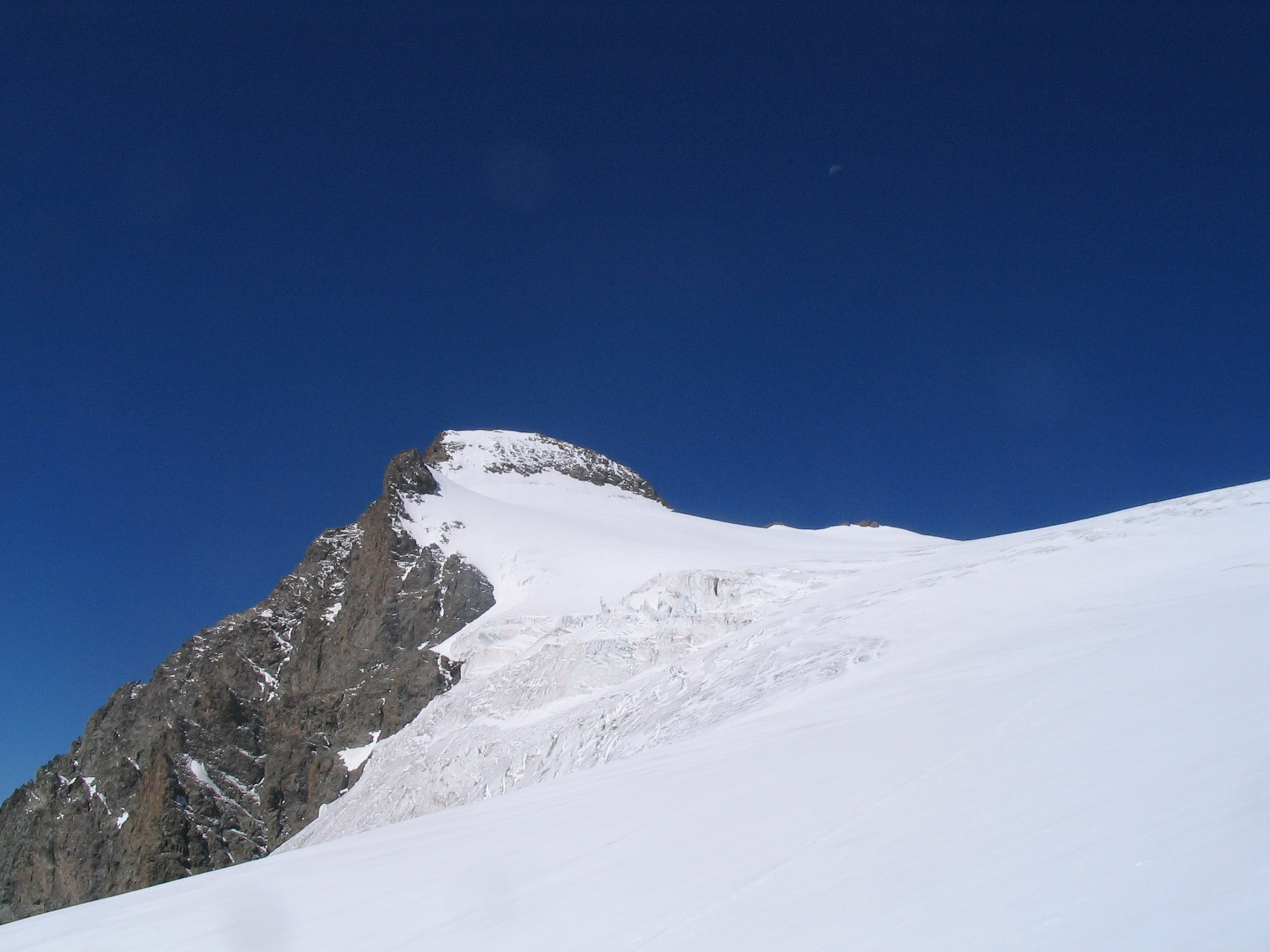
- Les Rouies in the Massif des Écrins

Highest point
- Elevation: 3,589 m (11,775 ft)
- Listing: Alpine mountains above 3000 m

Geography
- Location within France
- Location: Isère / Hautes-Alpes, France
- Parent range: Massif des Écrins

Climbing
- First ascent: 19 June 1873

Les Rouies is a mountain in the French Alps, located in the Massif des Écrins. The summit reaches 3,589 metres (11,775 ft) and lies on the border between the French departments of Isère and Hautes-Alpes, between the valleys of the Vénéon (Oisans) and the Séveraisse (Valgaudemar).

The mountain is characterized by a large glaciated plateau above approximately 3,400 metres, making it one of the more accessible high-altitude mountaineering objectives in the southern Massif des Écrins.

The first recorded ascent took place on 19 June 1873 by Frederick Gardiner, Thomas Cox, William Martin Pendlebury, Charles Taylor, Hans and Peter Baumann, Peter Knubel and Josef Marie Lochmatter during the golden age of Alpine mountaineering.
