= Carn an Fhidhleir =

Mountain in Scotland

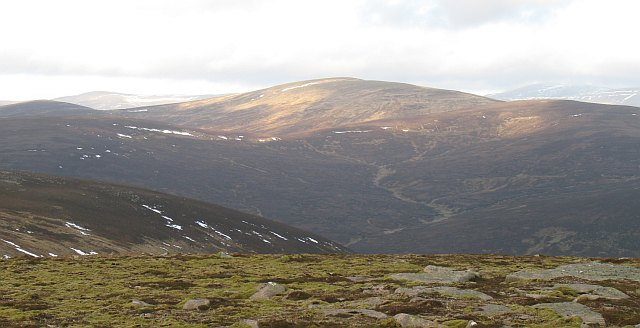
- Carn an Fhidhleir

Highest point
- Elevation: 994 m (3,261 ft)
- Prominence: 286 m (938 ft)
- Listing: Munro, Marilyn
- Coordinates: 56°56′09″N 3°48′06″W

Geography
- Location: Highland / Perth and Kinross / Aberdeenshire, Scotland
- Parent range: Grampian Mountains
- OS grid: NN904841
- Topo map: OS Landranger 43

Carn an Fhidhleir (994 m) is a mountain in the Grampian Mountains of Scotland. It lies on the border of Inverness-shire, Perthshire and Aberdeenshire, in one of the most remote areas of Scotland between the Cairngorms and the Mounth.

A domed mountain, it lies at the heart of a vast roadless area. It is possible to reach the peak from Glen Tilt or via the Linn of Dee by mountain bike.

It is the triple point between the catchment area of three rivers: the River Dee, the River Spey and the River Tay.
