= Sgùrr Dearg =

Mountain on the Isle of Skye, Scotland

Coordinates: 57.21270°N 6.23484°W

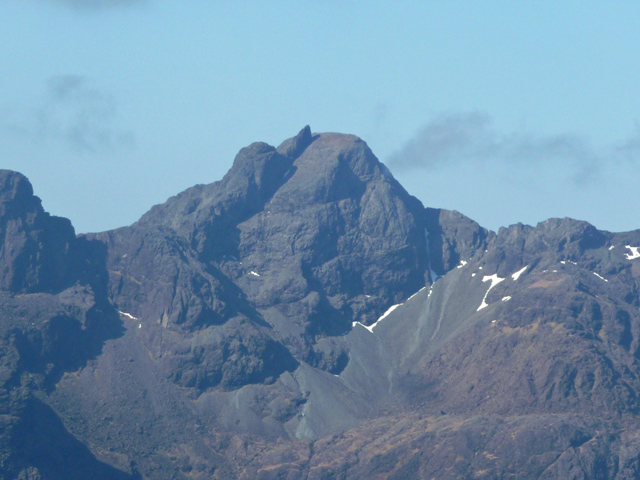
- Sgùrr Dearg and the Inaccessible Pinnacle

Highest point
- Elevation: 985.8 m (3,234 ft)
- Prominence: 187 m (614 ft)
- Parent peak: Sgùrr Alasdair
- Listing: Munro, Marilyn

Naming
- English translation: red rocky peak
- Language of name: Gaelic
- Pronunciation: Scottish Gaelic: [ˈs̪kuːrˠ ˈtʲɛɾɛk]

Geography
- Location: Skye, Scotland
- Parent range: Cuillin
- OS grid: NG444215
- Topo map: OS Landranger 32

Climbing
- First ascent: 1880, by Charles and Lawrence Pilkington
- Easiest route: rock climb (Moderate)

Sgùrr Dearg (Scottish Gaelic for 'red rocky peak') is a mountain in the Cuillin on the Isle of Skye, Scotland. It is topped by the Inaccessible Pinnacle (or An Stac in Gaelic), a fin of rock measuring 50 metres (160 ft) along its longest edge. The top of the Pinnacle stands at 985.8 m (3,234 ft) above sea level, making Sgùrr Dearg the only Munro with a peak that can only be reached by rock climbing. This makes it the biggest hurdle for many Munro baggers.

First climbed by Charles and Lawrence Pilkington in 1880, the Pinnacle was never climbed by Sir Hugh Munro himself. Because of its status as the most difficult of the Munros it has now spawned a cottage industry for the local guides, who are often seen escorting parties of novice climbers. Unlike much of the Cuillin, the pinnacle is basalt, not gabbro, and thus is somewhat slippery when wet.

== Geography ==
Sgùrr Dearg lies on the main Cuillin ridge at the junction of Coire Lagan, Coire na Banachdich and Coir'-uisg. It is the second highest peak in the Cuillin, and faces the highest, Sgùrr Alasdair, across Coire Lagan.

Although the name Sgùrr Dearg refers to the mountain as a whole, references to the "summit" of Sgùrr Dearg are, unless otherwise qualified, generally taken to indicate the 978-metre (3,209 ft) top immediately below the Inaccessible Pinnacle on the north-western side. For reasons that remain unclear, this summit was listed as a Munro in the first (1891) edition of Munro's Tables, while the higher Pinnacle was listed as a subsidiary top; this situation was reversed in the first revision of the tables in 1921.

== Ascents ==
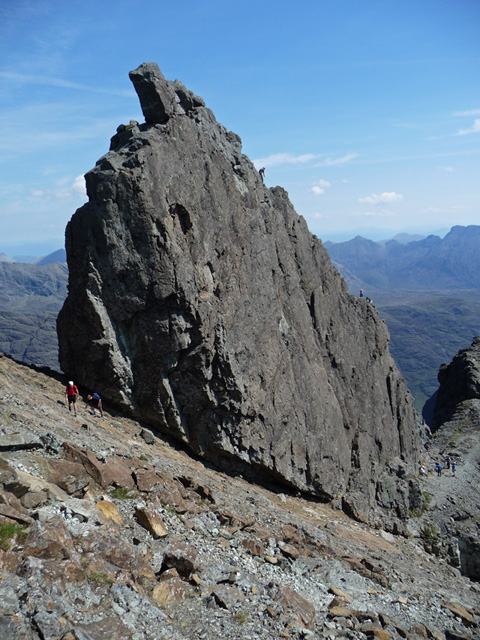
The Inaccessible Pinnacle, taken from near the (lower) top of Sgùrr Dearg

=== Approach ===
While the Inaccessible Pinnacle is the hardest of the Cuillin's summits to reach, the approach to its base is relatively simple by Cuillin standards. Most walkers and climbers start from Glen Brittle, from where the easiest route involves following the faint path to the Bealach Coire na Banachdich via the corrie of the same name; from here the top of Sgùrr Dearg may be gained via a tedious scree slope interspersed with some easy scrambling. A more interesting ascent may be achieved by ascending the screes of Sròn Dearg, which leads to Sgùrr Dearg's narrow and rocky south-west ridge, a grade 1/2 scramble.

Many climbers tackle the mountain as part of a circuit of the Coire Lagan skyline, or a traverse of the main Cuillin ridge, approaching it along the ridge from Sgùrr MhicChoinnich to the south-east (Grade 2). In this case the top of Sgùrr Dearg can be reached direct by scrambling up the broad flank to the left of An Stac and the Inaccessible Pinnacle.

=== The Inaccessible Pinnacle ===
The Inaccessible Pinnacle (An Stac in Gaelic), colloquially called the 'In Pin' or 'In Pinn' by mountaineers, was first climbed on 18 August 1880 by a pair of Lancashire brothers, Charles and Lawrence Pilkington. They were guided to the foot of the climb from Sligachan via Coruisk and Bealach Coire na Banachdich by a local shepherd called John Mackenzie. They climbed it by the east ridge, and had to throw down a lot of loose rock as they climbed.

The usual ascent of the Inaccessible Pinnacle itself is by its long east ridge, a climb of 50 m (160 ft) vertically involving two roped 30 m (98 ft) pitches. Although graded Moderate (the lowest grade now in use in the British grading system), with good holds, the ridge is narrow and exceptionally exposed. This route was described by an early climber as "a knife-edged ridge, with an overhanging and infinite drop on one side, and a drop on the other side even steeper and longer". Some climbers prefer to tackle the much shorter west ridge (20 m (66 ft)), graded Very Difficult. It is usual to descend from the summit of the Pinnacle by abseiling off the west end, and a permanent anchor is sited on the summit for this purpose.

In 2014 cyclist Danny MacAskill climbed Sgùrr Dearg without safety ropes, while carrying a mountain bike on his back. The video was viewed over 14 million times in the week following its launch on 2 October 2014 and has been watched over 81.88 million times (as of November 2025).

== See also ==
- Seachd: The Inaccessible Pinnacle
