= River Finnan =

River in Highland, Scotland

Coordinates: 56.87°N 5.4388°W

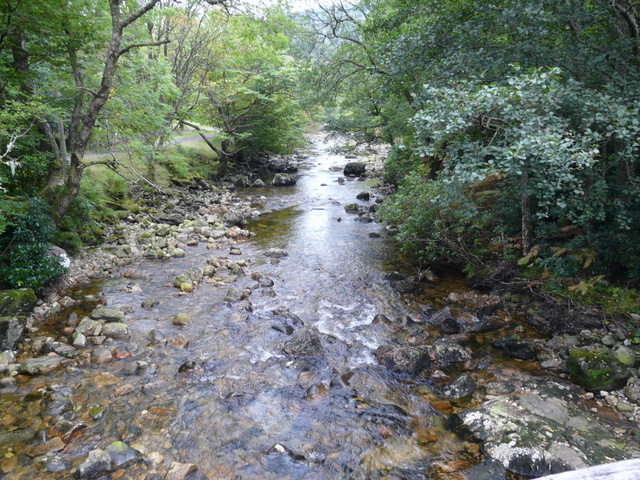
The River Finnan near Tim Dubh, looking north

The River Finnan is a river in Highland, Scotland that flows from Glen Finnan. Rising from the waters of two streams near Corryhully, one named Allt a' Chaol Ghlinne, the River Finnan drains into Loch Shiel. It flows underneath the Glenfinnan Viaduct at Glenfinnan.
