= Gleann Dubh Lighe =

Valley in Lochaber, Scotland

- Gleann Dubh-lighe
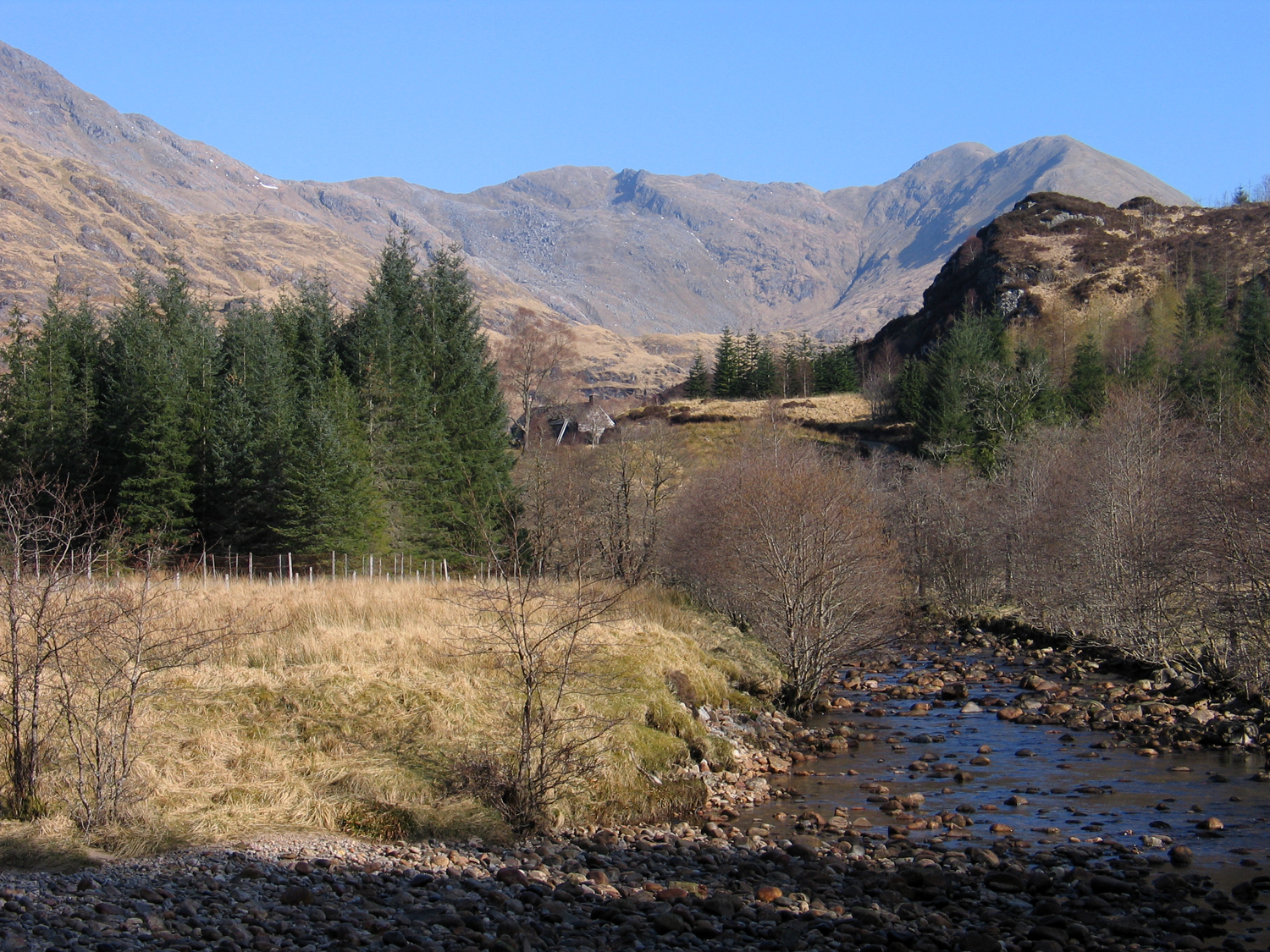
- Gleann Dubh Lighe, with the Dubh Lighe river in flow and the eponymous bothy in the distance

Geography
- Location: Northwest Highlands
- Country: Scotland
- State: Highland
- District: Lochaber
- Coordinates: 56.884°N 5.375°W
- Topo map: OS Landranger 40
- River: Dubh Lighe
- Interactive map of Gleann Dubh Lighe

Gleann Dubh Lighe (also spelled Gleann Dubh-lighe) is a glen (valley) in Lochaber, Highland, Scotland, located at the foot of Streap in the Northwest Highlands mountain range. The Dubh Lighe river flows through the length of the valley. A frequented spot for hiking, the valley is known for the eponymous bothy located in the valley which is maintained by the Mountain Bothies Association (MBA). It accidentally burned down in late 2011, but was rebuilt in June 2013 by volunteers of the MBA.

== Etymology ==
Gleann Dubh Lighe means "glen of the dark stream," a glen being a narrow valley, especially one with a river running through it.
