= Streap =

Mountain in Scotland

Coordinates: 56.923017°N 5.3754694°W

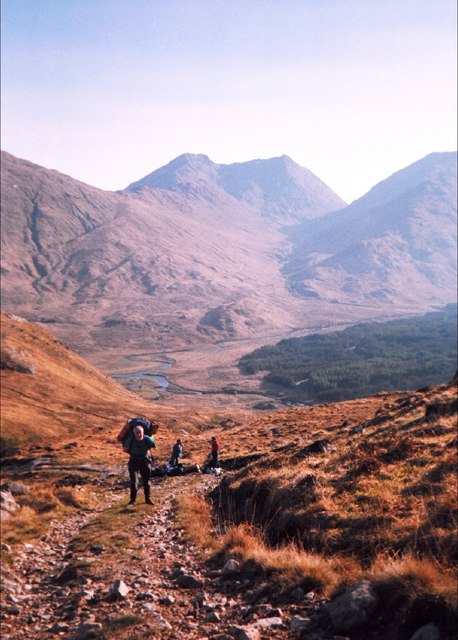
- Streap in the distance

Highest point
- Elevation: 911.6 m (2,991 ft)
- Prominence: 441
- Listing: Corbett, Marilyn

Naming
- English translation: Climb
- Language of name: Scottish Gaelic

Geography
- Location: Scotland
- Parent range: Northwest Highlands
- OS grid: NM94668637

Streap is a mountain in Lochaber, Highland, Scotland. It lies on a long ridge that separates Glen Finnan from Gleann Dubh Lighe, about 5 km north-east of the village of Glenfinnan.
