= Sgùrr Dubh Mòr =

944-metre mountain in Cuillins, Scotland

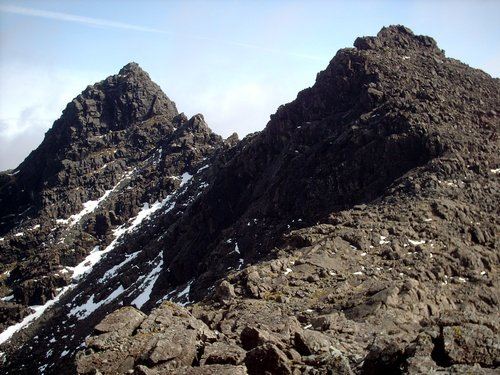
- Looking east from the Cuillin ridge to Sgùrr Dubh Mòr on the left and Sgurr Dubh an Da Bhein on the right.

Highest point
- Elevation: 944 m (3,097 ft)
- Prominence: 89 m (292 ft)
- Parent peak: Sgurr Alasdair
- Listing: Munro
- Coordinates: 57°12′18″N 06°12′39″W

Naming
- English translation: big black peak
- Language of name: Gaelic

Geography
- Location within Highland
- Location: Black Cuillin, Scotland
- Parent range: Cuillin
- OS grid: NG457205
- Topo map(s): OS Landranger 32; Explorer 411

Climbing
- First ascent: 1874, Alexander Nicolson & John MacKenzie & Duncan MacIntyre
- Easiest route: Scramble up Coir' a' Grunnda

Sgùrr Dubh Mòr is a 944-metre (3,097 ft) mountain, a Munro, in the Cuillin range on the Isle of Skye in Scotland. It is slightly to the east of the main Cuillin ridge at the highest point of the Dubh ridge which extends eastwards to Loch Coruisk.

== Geographical situation and topography ==
The 944-metre (3,097 ft) Sgùrr Dubh Mòr lies some 250 metres (820 ft) east of its associated Munro Top, the 938-metre (3,077 ft) Sgùrr Dubh an Da Bheinn, which lies directly on the Cuillin ridge. The summit (one of the sharpest in the Cuillin) is at the western end of the narrow summit ridge. The first ascent of the mountain was made in 1874 by Alexander Nicolson and Duncan MacIntyre, a local forester and hillwalker. Sgùrr Dubh Beag lies a further one kilometre to the east beyond Sgùrr Dubh Mòr. These mountains are situated on the gabbro Dubh ridge which traverses east from Sgùrr Dubh an Da Bheinn and eventually reaches Loch Coruisk. (Note: The main Cuillin ridge is predominantly composed of gabbro which has an excellent grip for climbing and scrambling.)

== Climbing the mountain ==
Sketch map of main Black Cuillin ridge

The ascent to the top of Sgùrr Dubh Mòr via Dubh ridge from Loch Coruisk is one of the finest in Britain. The route involves not more than climbing graded as Moderate but a short abseil is normally made down from the top of Sgùrr Dubh Beag. The ascent up Coir' a' Grunnda from Glen Brittle is easier and shorter. The central route up the coire is craggy and preferable routes lie both to the north and south. Descents are possible west down Coire' a' Grunnda, southeast via Caisteal a' Garbh-choire to the coire itself, or south and then southeast traversing the southern section of the Cuillin ridge.

The southern slopes of the Dubh ridge are craggy and steep and are not inviting to climbers.
