= Beinn Dearg Mhor (Sligachan) =

Scottish mountain

Coordinates: 57.27949°N 6.11598°W

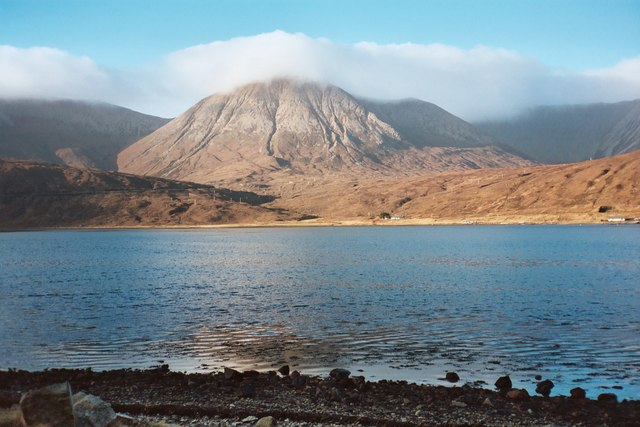
- Beinn Dearg Mhor from Loch Ainort

Highest point
- Elevation: 731 m (2,398 ft)
- Prominence: 316 m (1,037 ft)
- Listing: Marilyn, Graham

Geography
- Location: Skye, Scotland
- Parent range: Red Cuillin
- OS grid: NG520284
- Topo map: OS Landranger 32

Beinn Dearg Mhor (731 m) is a mountain in the Red Cuillin mountains of the Isle of Skye. It is located between Loch Ainort and the settlement of Sligachan.

Beinn Dearg Mhor is the middle summit of the three big Red Hills near Sligachan, along with Marsco and Glamaig, the latter of which it is usually climbed in conjunction with. A fine, conical peak, its slopes are steep and covered in scree.
