= Am Basteir =

Mountain in Scotland

- Am Bàisteir
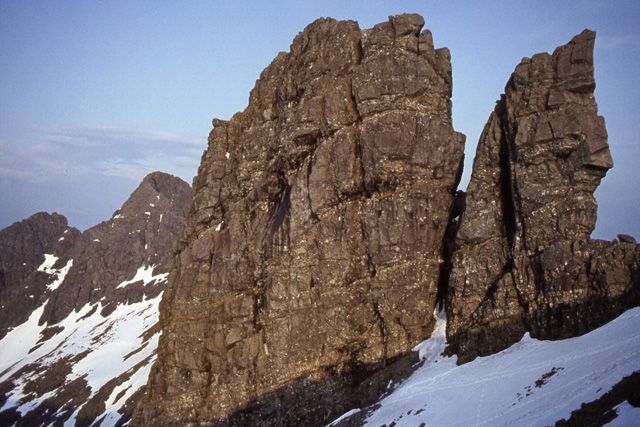

Highest point
- Elevation: 934 m (3,064 ft)
- Prominence: 49 m (161 ft)
- Listing: Munro
- Coordinates: 57°14′53″N 6°12′14″W

Naming
- Language of name: Gaelic
- Pronunciation: English: /æm ˈbæstɛər/ Scottish Gaelic: [əm ˈpaʃtʲɛɾʲ]

Geography
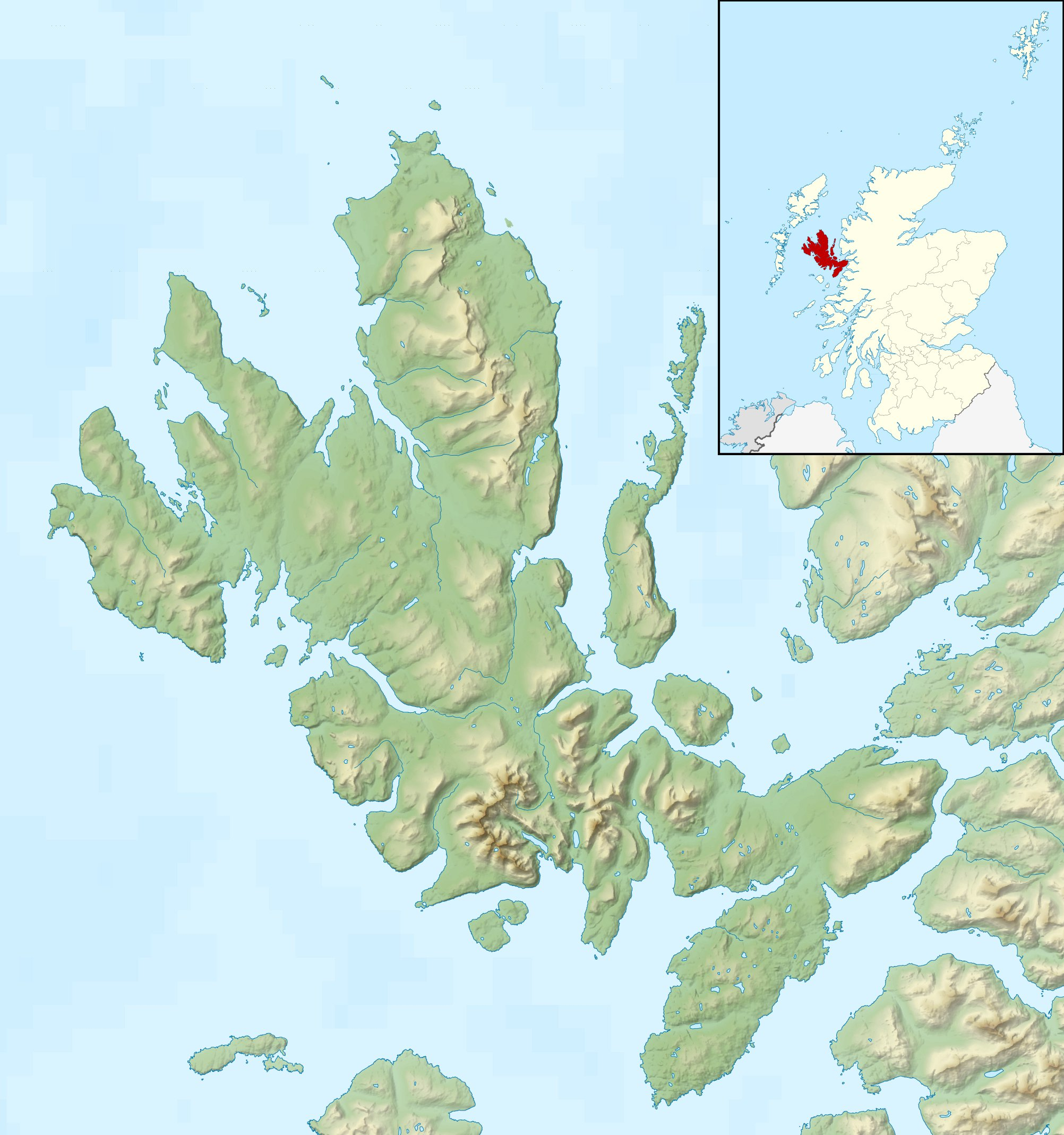
- Location within Isle of Skye
- Location: Cuillin, Skye, Scotland
- OS grid: NG465253
- Topo map: OS Landranger 32

Am Basteir (Scottish Gaelic: Am Bàisteir, 'the baptizer') is a mountain peak in the northern Cuillin range on the Isle of Skye in Scotland. It is 934 metres (3,064 feet) high and classed as a Munro. It forms a narrow blade of rock, which bears comparison with the Inaccessible Pinnacle in the same range.

The easiest route to the summit starts from Sligachan following a path along the left bank of the Allt Dearg Beag (small red burn) for 5 kilometres (3 miles) to a small lochan in the Coire a' Bhasteir, then up a gruelling scree slope to the bealach on the main ridge between Sgurr nan Gillean and Am Basteir. A scramble of approximately 200 m (660 ft) along the east ridge will bring you to the summit although care should be taken near the top as there is a "bad step", a 3-metre-high (10-foot) notch in the ridge to negotiate. This could be scrambled down until recently, but a rockfall now means it must be avoided, downclimbed or abseiled. The bad step is most easily avoided via an elusive moderate scrambling route on the south face but can be reascended (i.e. on the descent from the summit) without difficulty. The western end of Am Basteir is vertical, though it is possible for a walker coming from the direction of Bruach na Frìthe to reach the top by skirting below Am Basteir to reach the bealach mentioned above.

At the foot of the western side, there is a large prominent pinnacle, similar in shape to Am Basteir itself, known as the Basteir Tooth.
