= Sgùrr nan Gillean =

Mountain in Scotland

Coordinates: 57.24735°N 6.19402°W

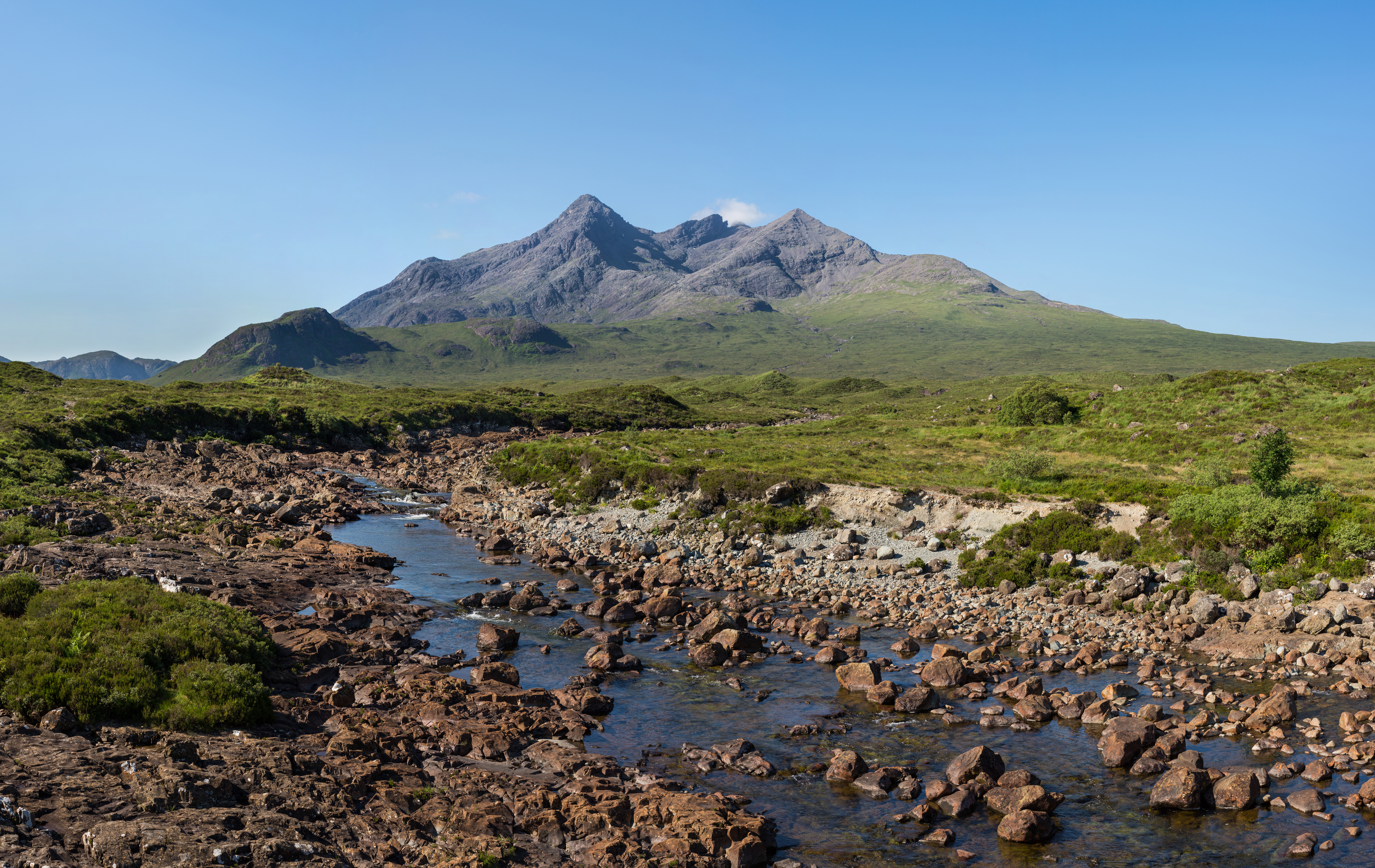
- The peaks of Sgùrr nan Gillean (top left), Am Basteir (top middle) and Sgurr a'Bhasteir (top right) from Sligachan

Highest point
- Elevation: 966.1 m (3,170 ft)
- Prominence: c. 205 m
- Parent peak: Sgùrr Alasdair
- Listing: Munro, Marilyn

Naming
- English translation: peak of the young men
- Language of name: Gaelic
- Pronunciation: Scottish Gaelic: [ˈs̪kuːrˠ nəŋ ˈkʲiʎən]

Geography
- Location: Skye, Scotland
- Parent range: Cuillin
- OS grid: NG471252
- Topo map: OS Landranger 32

Climbing
- First ascent: 7 July 1836, by Duncan Macintyre and James Forbes
- Easiest route: Scramble

Listed summits of Sgùrr nan Gillean
Name	Grid ref	Height	Status
Knight's Peak	NG471254	914 m	Corbett Top
Sgùrr Beag	NG476246	764 m	Corbett Top
Sgùrr na h-Uamha	NG476240	736 m	Graham Top

Sgùrr nan Gillean is a peak in the northern part of the Cuillin mountains on the Isle of Skye in Scotland. With a height of 966 metres (3,169 feet), it is one of eleven Munros in the Cuillins. It is the Munro peak nearest to the settlement of Sligachan, and its impressive triangular profile makes it one of the most recognizable of the Cuillins.

== Routes ==
The most popular route of ascent, known as the Tourist Route, follows a path leading south and west from Sligachan, crossing a burn known as the Allt Dearg Beag (small red burn). The route continues up into a corrie, the Coire Rhiabhach. The ascent of the coire headwall is on loose rock and scree. The continuation up the southeast ridge to the summit is exposed, and calls for scrambling ability. The path up is very narrow so calls for single file when a party ascends. The top is a ridge which must be traversed to reach the final summit, and like the climb, needs some scrambling ability. All sides are very exposed, and extra care is needed if mist descends. The small airy summit platform is surprisingly smooth and flat with outstanding views.

An alternative route is the north ridge, known as Pinnacle Ridge, which is a rock climb that requires a climber to have a rope and harness and be capable of abseiling, unless the third pinnacle is omitted by bypassing on the east side. While rope is a sensible option for the moderate climb up Gillean, it is not required for Knight's Peak if the correct route is taken. To reach the base of the Pinnacle Ridge a climber starts in the same place as for the route described above but instead of crossing the burn continues up hill on the right hand side until just below the start of the Basteir gorge when the stream exiting the gorge is crossed to reach the base of the lowest pinnacle.

Another alternative route of ascent or descent is the West Ridge. It leads from the summit down to a bealach separating Sgùrr nan Gillean from Am Basteir. About two-thirds of the way down, there is a particularly narrow and exposed section, which forms the remains of a large upright rock, known as the Gendarme which broke away due to the effects of frost shatter during the winter of 1986/87, leaving only the base. The narrow section can be avoided by abseiling down (or climbing up) a gully, known as Nicholson's Chimney, on the north side of the ridge.

== Name and classification ==
In November 2013 it was found that Knight's Peak is 6 1/2 inches (17 centimetres) too short to be classified as a Munro Top (a satellite peak of a Munro being over 3,000 feet (914 m) but without significant height drop between the two peaks) and is now considered a Corbett Top. Knight's Peak was named after W. Knight, who, with a guide, made the first recorded ascent in 1873.

== Gallery ==
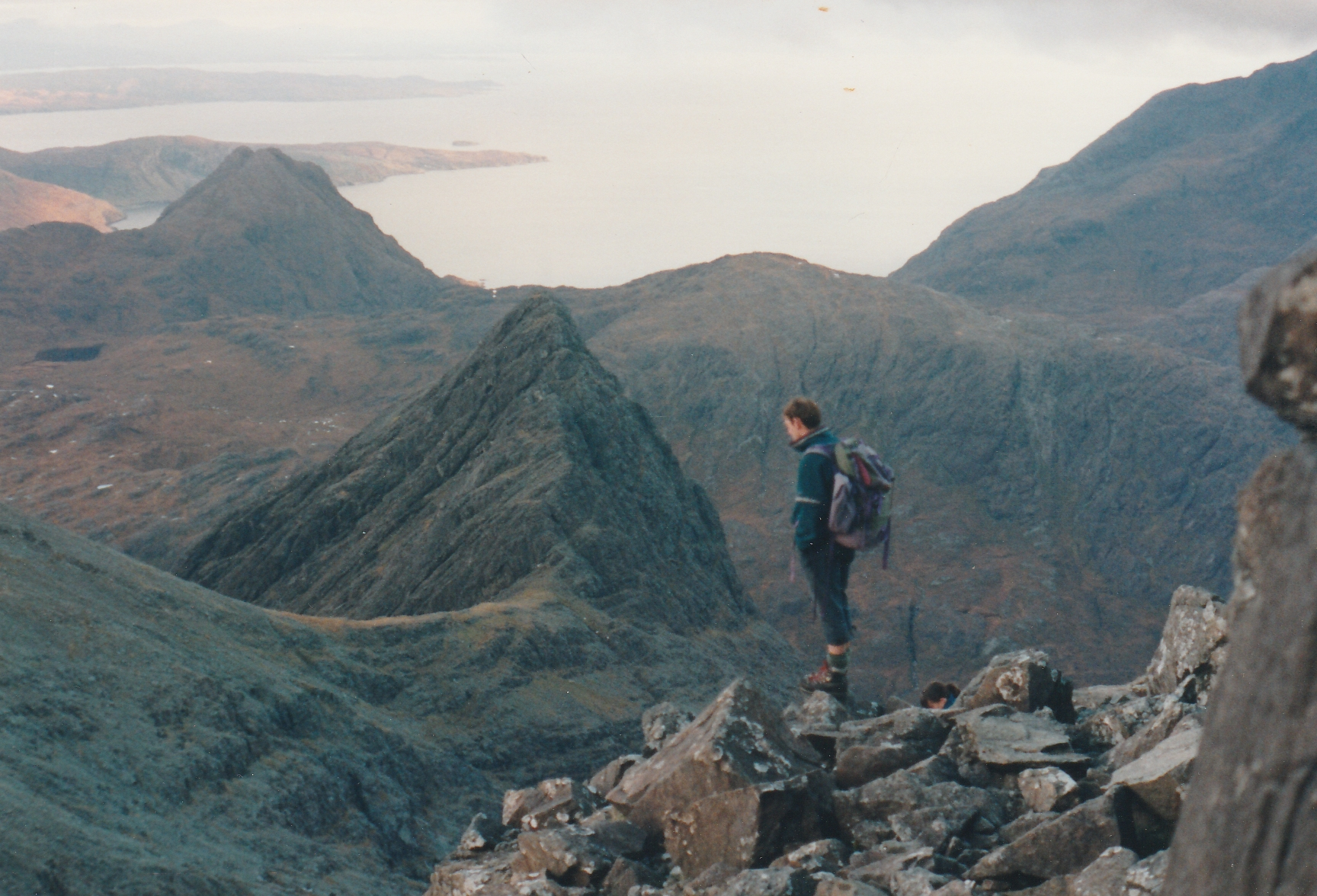
Looking down the southeastern ridge, October 1997

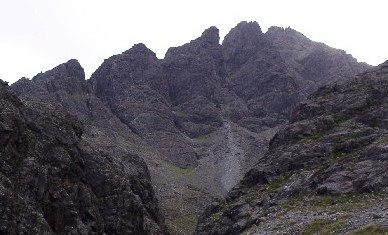
Sgùrr nan Gillean and the Pinnacle Ridge from Basteir gorge
