= Belig =

Mountain on the Isle of Skye, Scotland

Coordinates: 57.240983°N 6.072284°W

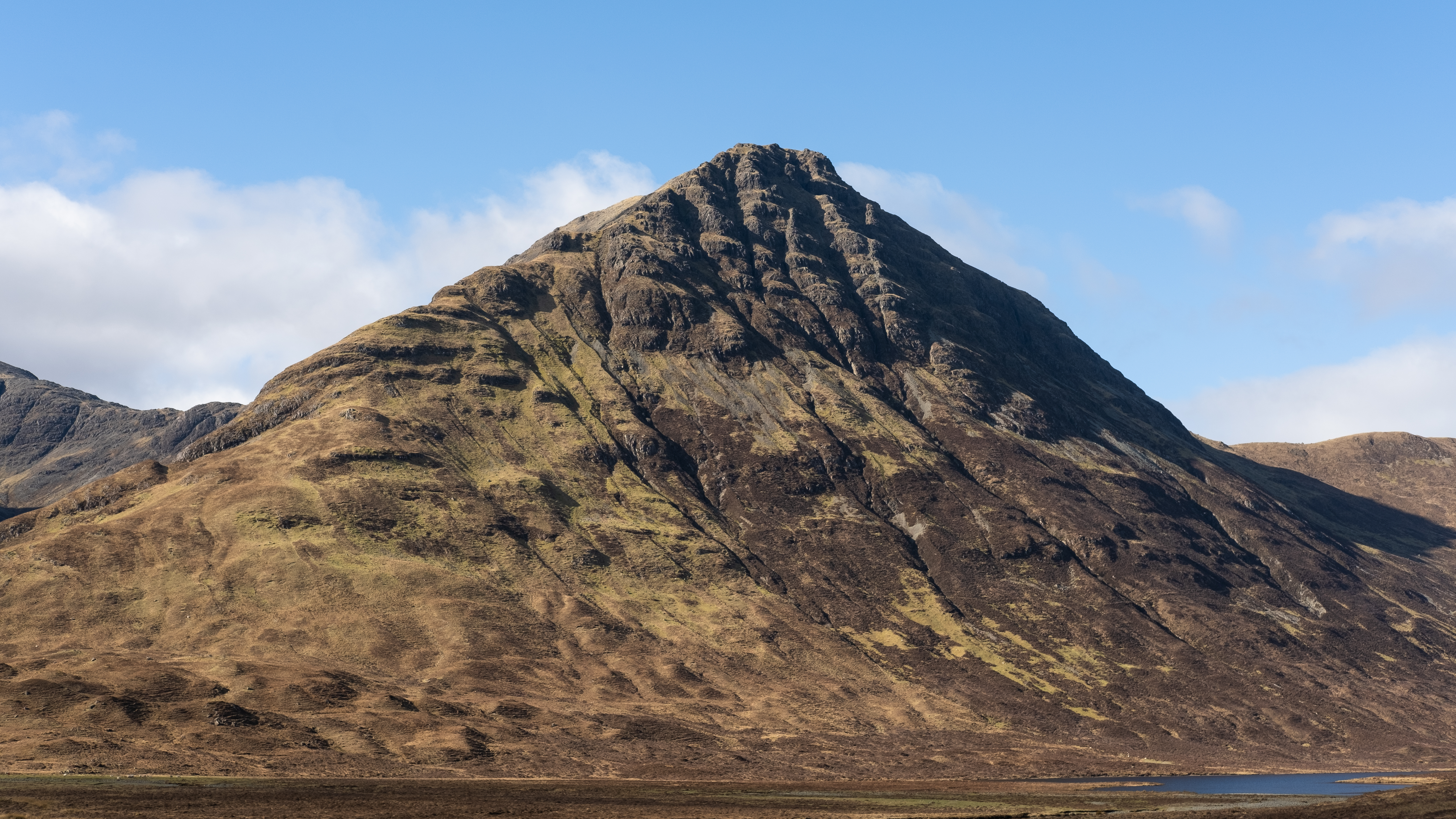
- Belig

Highest point
- Elevation: 702 m (2,303 ft)
- Prominence: 246 m (807 ft)
- Listing: Marilyn, Graham

Geography
- Location: Skye, Scotland
- Parent range: Cuillin (outlier)
- OS grid: NG544240
- Topo map: OS Landranger 32

Belig (702 m) is a mountain in the Cuillin mountains of the Isle of Skye. It is located in the centre of the island, northeast of the main Black Cuillin range.

A fine and sharp peak, Belig's summit is the culmination of three ridges. It is often climbed in conjunction with its neighbour Garbh-bheinn. The nearest village is Dunan, to the east.
