= Sgùrr a' Mhadaidh =

Mountain in Highland, Scotland

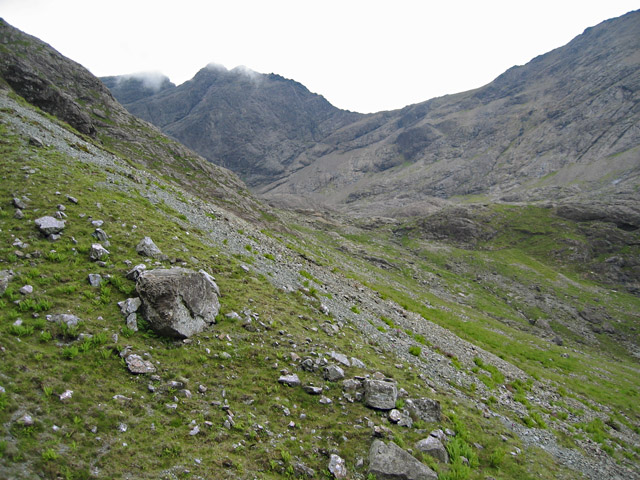
- Sgùrr a' Mhadaidh overlooking Coir' a' Mhadaidh

Highest point
- Elevation: 918 m (3,012 ft)
- Prominence: 71 m (233 ft)
- Listing: Munro
- Coordinates: 57°13′51″N 6°14′01″W

Naming
- English translation: peak of the dog / fox
- Language of name: Gaelic
- Pronunciation: Scottish Gaelic: [ˈs̪kuːrˠ ə ˈvat̪ɪ]

Geography
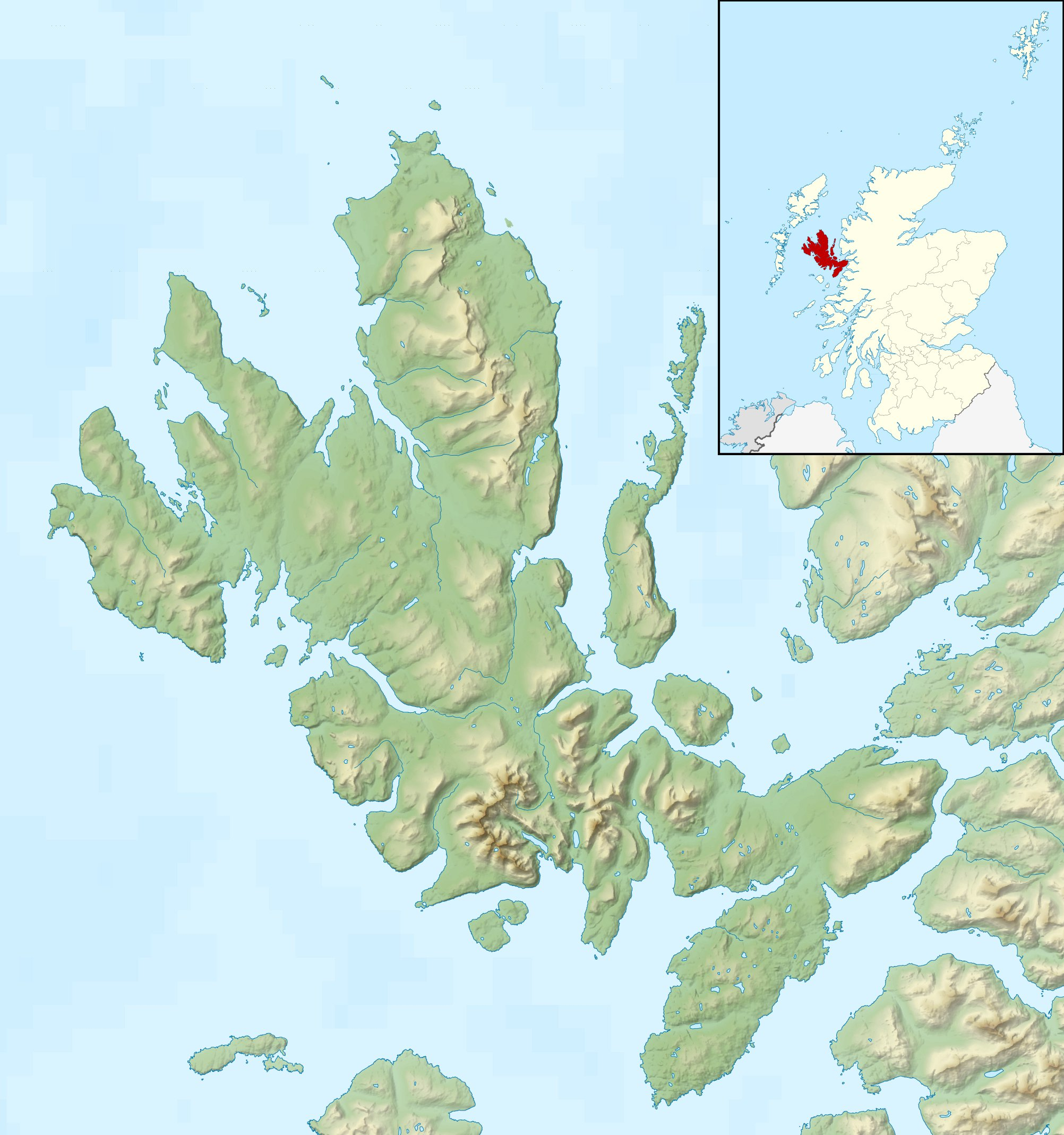
- Location within Isle of Skye
- Location: Skye, Scotland
- Parent range: Cuillin
- OS grid: NG446235
- Topo map: OS Landranger 32

Climbing
- First ascent: Possibly 1887, John MacKenzie and H.C. Hart
- Easiest route: Scramble

Sgùrr a' Mhadaidh (Scottish Gaelic for 'peak of the dog / fox') is a mountain peak in the Black Cuillin range on the Isle of Skye, Scotland. It is a Munro with a height of 918 metres (3,012 ft). Like the rest of the range it is composed of gabbro, a rock with excellent grip for mountaineering.

The simplest route ascends via the col of An Dorus (the Door), most easily reached from Glen Brittle. The mountain has four summits; only the highest can be reached by scramblers. The three lower summits require rock-climbing skills and equipment.
