= Marsco =

Mountain in Scotland

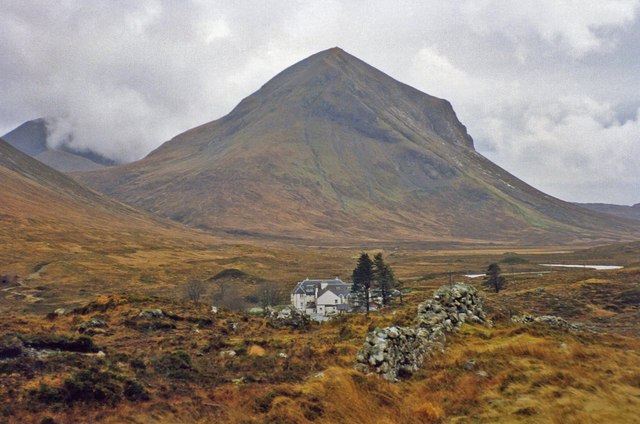
- View of Marsco from Sligachan

Highest point
- Elevation: 736 m (2,415 ft)
- Prominence: 413 m (1,355 ft)
- Parent peak: Blaven
- Listing: Graham, Marilyn
- Coordinates: 57.24932°N 6.13452°W

Naming
- English translation: Seagull hill
- Language of name: Norse
- Pronunciation: /ˈmɛərskoʊ/

Geography
- Location: Red Cuillin, Skye, Scotland
- OS grid: NG507252
- Topo map: OS Landranger 32

Marsco is a peak in the Red Hills on the Isle of Skye in Scotland. It lies on the east of Glen Sligachan, and may be climbed from the right-of-way through the glen from Sligachan to Loch Coruisk. Alternatively, it may also be reached from Coire nam Bruadaran on the western side.

Marsco has magnificent views of the main Cuillin ridge as well as out to sea; many walkers reckon it is perhaps the finest of all the Grahams.

A photograph of Marsco and Glen Sligachan, taken by Richard Nutt, features on the cover of the second album by British synthpop band Orchestral Manoeuvres in the Dark (OMD), Organisation, released in October 1980.

Scottish rock group Runrig released a song called "Nightfall on Marsco" on their 1981 album Recovery.
