= Garbh-bheinn (Skye) =

Mountain on the Isle of Skye, Scotland

Coordinates: 57.233105°N 6.092474°W

- Garvan
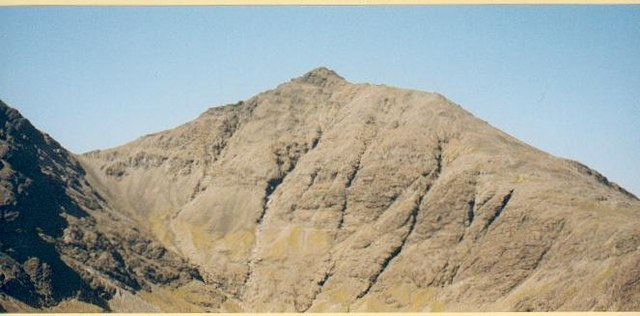
- Garbh-bheinn

Highest point
- Elevation: 808 m (2,651 ft)
- Prominence: 181 m (594 ft); List of Corbett mountains in Scotland
- Parent peak: Blà Bheinn
- Listing: Marilyn, Corbett

Geography
- Location: Skye, Scotland
- Parent range: Cuillin (outlier)
- OS grid: NG531232
- Topo map: OS Landranger 32

Garbh-Bheinn (also known as Garven) (808 m), is a mountain in the Cuillin mountains of the Isle of Skye. It is located in the centre of the island, northeast of the main Black Cuillin range.

Part Red Cuillin granite, and part Black Cuillin gabbro, Garbh-bheinn is an excellent peak for straightforward scrambling, and offers fantastic views from its summit. The nearest village is Torrin to the south.
