= Sgùrr nan Eag =

Mountain in the Cuillins, Scotland

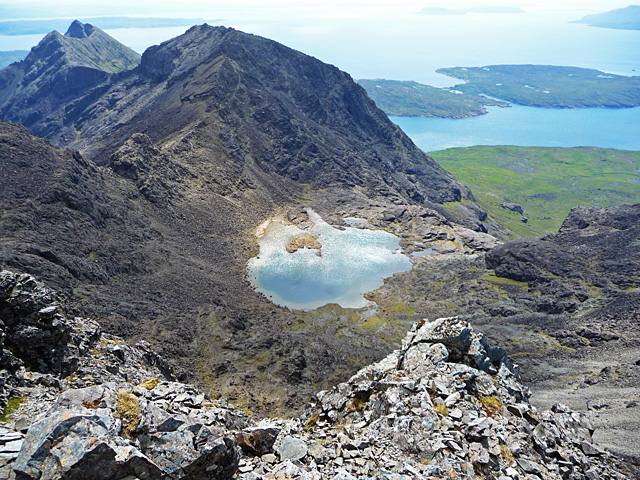
- Looking southeast over Coir' a' Ghrunnda to Sgùrr nan Eag

Highest point
- Elevation: 924 m (3,031 ft)
- Prominence: 131 m (430 ft)
- Parent peak: Sgùrr Dubh an Da Bheinn
- Listing: Munro
- Coordinates: 57°11′45″N 06°12′41″W

Naming
- English translation: peak of the notches
- Language of name: Gaelic

Geography
- Location within Highland
- Location: Black Cuillin, Scotland
- Parent range: Cuillin
- OS grid: NG457195
- Topo map(s): OS Landranger 32; Explorer 411

Climbing
- Easiest route: Scramble up Coir' a' Ghrunnda

Sgùrr nan Eag is a mountain 924 metres (3,031 ft) high in the Cuillin range on the Isle of Skye, Scotland. It is the southernmost Munro of the Cuillins and it lies between Coir' a' Ghrunnda to the west, Gars-bheinn to the east, and Garb-choire to the north.

== Geography ==
The 924-metre (3,031 ft) Sgùrr nan Eag is the most southerly Munro on the ridge with Gars-bheinn, some two kilometres (1 1/4 miles) southeast, marking the end of the ridge. Loch Brittle and the Scavaig River are to the west and east. Sgùrr Dubh an Da Beinn, a Munro Top is on the ridge to the north with Coir' a' Ghrunnda to the west and An Garbh-Coire to the east of this connecting ridge. On the ridge between Sgùrr nan Eag and Gars-bheinn is the shattered quartzite summit of Sgùrr a' Choire Bhig.

Sgùrr nan Eag is, by the standards of the Cuillin, is small compared with the peaks to the north but it is a huge mountain with a long and level summit ridge.

== Climbing ==
The mountain can be easily climbed from Glen Brittle up Coir' a' Grunnda, going south of Loch Coir' a' Grunnda to the Cuillin ridge and ascending the north ridge to the summit. The alternative of taking the south shoulder from the coastal path up 610 metres (2,000 ft) of scree is tedious, even though it is easy. From An Garbh-choire there is no easy way up the northeast flank but the north ridge and east ridge can be reached with scrambling. There is an easy and fine ridge walk to Gars-Bheinn.

Sketch map of main Black Cuillin ridge
