= Cuillin =

Mountain range on the Isle of Skye, Scotland

Cuillin Hills National Scenic Area
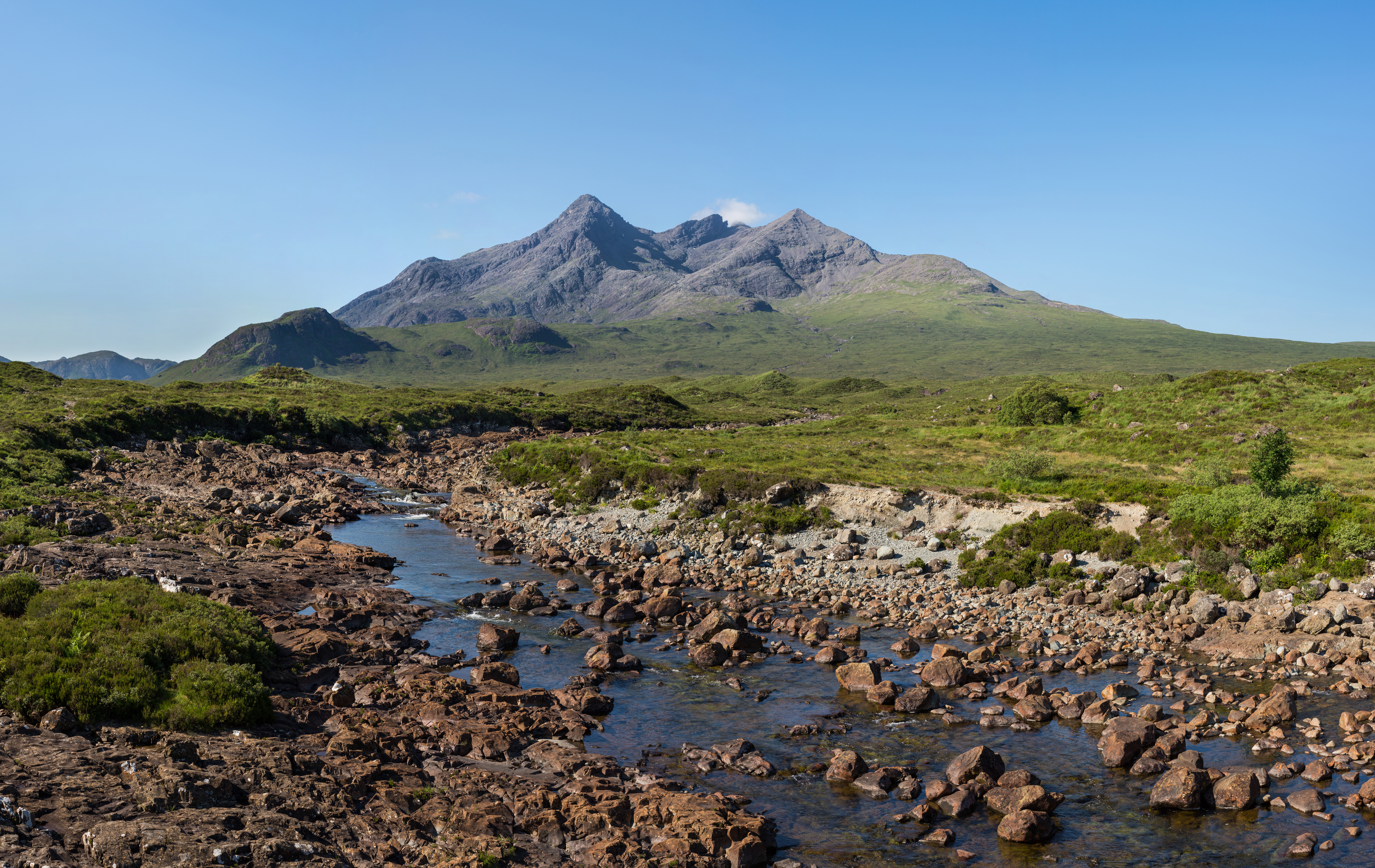
- The northern Cuillin (Sgùrr nan Gillean, Am Basteir and Bruach na Frìthe) from Sligachan.

- Location within Highland
- Location: Isle of Skye, Highland, Scotland
- Coordinates: 57.20°N 6.2°W
- Area: 227 km^{2} (88 sq mi)
- Established: 1981
- Governing body: NatureScot

The Cuillin (Scottish Gaelic: An Cuiltheann) is a range of mostly jagged rocky mountains on the Isle of Skye in Scotland. The main Cuillin ridge is also called the Black Cuillin to distinguish it from the Red Cuillin (na Beanntan Dearga), which lie to the east of Glen Sligachan.

The peaks of the Black Cuillin are mainly composed of gabbro, a very rough igneous rock which provides a superb grip for mountaineers; and basalt, which can be very slippery when wet. The rocks forming the ridge of the Black Cuillin (and outliers such Blà Bheinn) are dark, particularly in the shade, but when in sunlight the Black Cuillin can appear grey to brown. The main ridge forms a narrow crest, with steep cliffs and scree slopes. The ridge is about 14 kilometres (8 1/2 miles) long (from Gars-bheinn in the south to Sgùrr nan Gillean in the northeast), and curves in an irregular semi-circle around Loch Coruisk, which lies at the heart of the range. The highest point of the Cuillin, and of the Isle of Skye, is Sgùrr Alasdair in the Black Cuillin at 992 m (3,255 ft).

The Red Cuillin are mainly composed of granite, which is paler than the gabbro (with a reddish tinge from some angles in some lights) and has weathered into more rounded hills with vegetation cover to summit level and long scree slopes on their flanks. These hills are lower and, being less rocky, have fewer scrambles or climbs. The highest point of the red hills is Glamaig at 775 m (2,543 ft), one of only two Corbetts on Skye (the other being Garbh-bheinn, part of the small group of gabbro outliers surrounding Blà Bheinn).

The scenic beauty of the Cuillin has led to it being designated a national scenic area, one of forty such areas in Scotland. A Scottish Natural Heritage review of the special qualities of the Cuillin stated:

The mountains rise up dramatically from the sea creating formidable, enclosed sea lochs, with the absence of foothills enhancing their vast scale. Many iconic views of Scotland are centred here, whether Sgurr nan Gillean soaring above Sligachan, Loch Scavaig and the Cuillin ridge from Elgol, or Bla Bheinn above Torrin.

— Scottish Natural Heritage

== Etymology ==
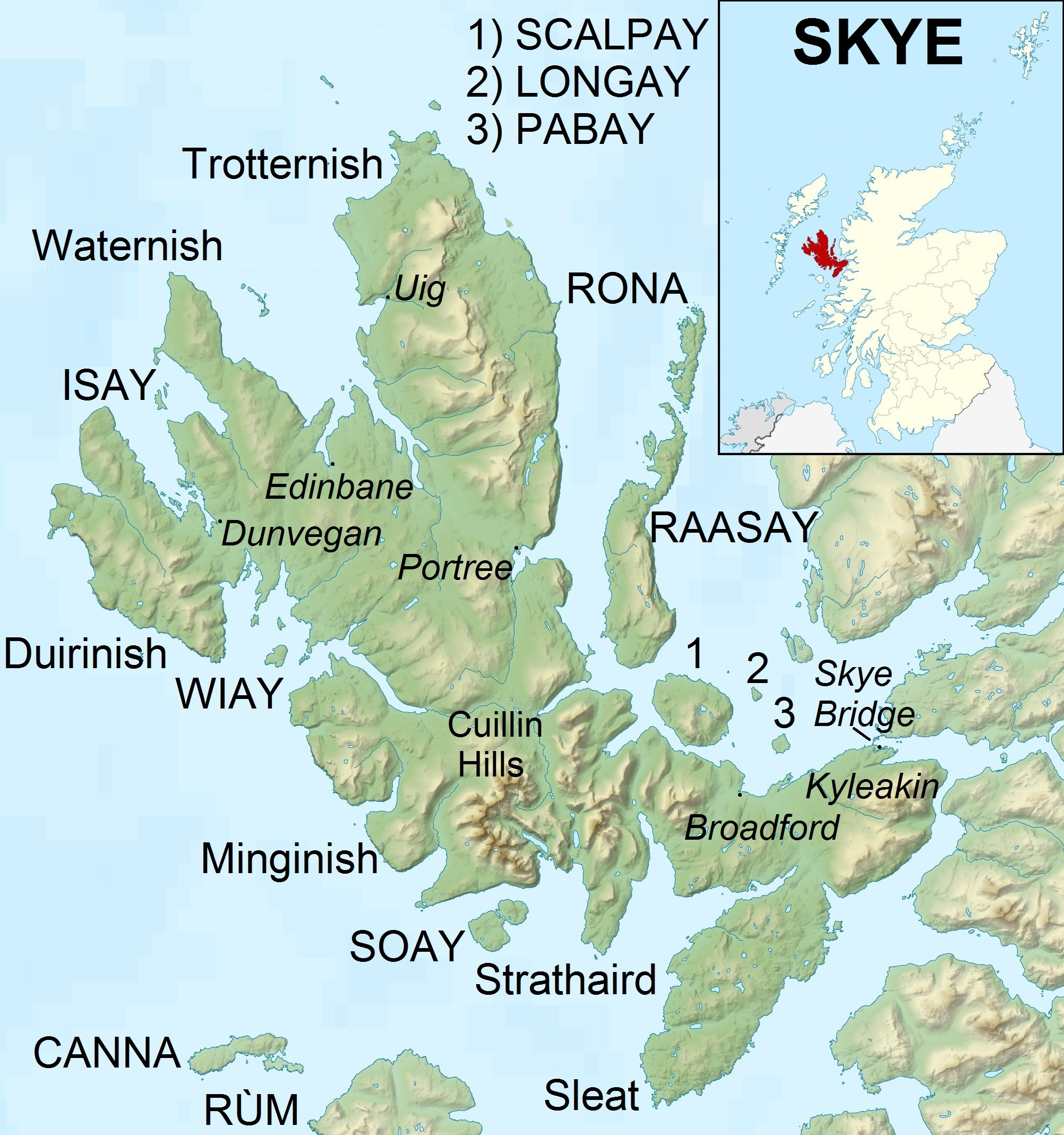
Skye and the surrounding islands, showing the location of the Cuillin.

There are several theories about the derivation of the name 'Cuillin'. One suggestion is that it comes from the Old Norse word kjölen, which literally means the keel of a boat, suggesting a similarity with an upturned Viking longship. Peter Drummond, in Scottish Hill and Mountain Names (1991), noted that this is also a name of the Scandinavian Mountains and says it can mean 'high rocky mountain'. Drummond later considered the Irish placename element cuilleann, meaning 'a steep slope', which is found in mountain names such as Slieve Gullion. However, he pointed out that the element is rare, and that most mountain names around Skye come from Norse. Another suggestion is that it comes from Gaelic cuilionn, meaning 'holly', because of the mountains' jagged shape. The name has also been linked to Gaelic mythology, with the hills being the place where Cúchullin learnt archery from the female warrior Scáthach.

== Natural history ==
The Cuillin are a diverse and complex geological landscape, and there is a clear distinction visible between the two mountain types. The mountains formed from the remains of the magma chambers which fed volcanic eruptions. In the Black Cuillin the rocks cooled to form gabbro, the coarse-grained rock that makes up much of the range. Cracks and fissures in the rock provided pathways for later magma intrusions, leading to dykes of basalt which are commonly seen across Skye. The Red Cuillin also have volcanic origins, being formed from a later intrusion of acidic, granitic rock. This granite was more uniformly eroded by wind and water than the gabbro and basalt, causing the red hills to have smoother outlines.

The Cuillin provide classic examples of glacial topography and were the subject of an early published account by James Forbes in 1846 (who had become a fellow of the Royal Society of Edinburgh aged only nineteen). He partnered Louis Agassiz on his trip to Scotland in 1840 and although they subsequently argued, Forbes went on to publish other important papers on Alpine glaciers. In 1904 Alfred Harker published The Tertiary Igneous Rocks of Skye, the first detailed scientific study of an extinct volcano.

The Cuillin encompasses a wide range of habitats, changing with altitude. At the base there are conifer plantations, coastal woodlands and areas of heather moorland and rough grassland. The lower slopes are covered by various different types of bog, with grassland on the better-drained slopes that are found above 400 m (1,300 ft). Higher up, the rocky hills are largely bare, with exposed rock and scree. The entire area is designated as a Special Protection Area under the Natura 2000 programme due particularly for its importance to golden eagles. The site is of European importance for these birds, and holds one of the highest-density populations in Britain, having an unusually high breeding productivity. Eleven pairs were estimated in 1992; this representing about 3% of the breeding population in Great Britain at that time.

The Cuillin are protected as a national scenic area, defined so as to identify areas of exceptional scenery and to ensure its protection from inappropriate development. The areas protected by the designation are considered to represent the type of scenic beauty "popularly associated with Scotland and for which it is renowned". The Cuillin Hills National Scenic Area covers 27,320 hectares (67,500 acres), of which 22,726 ha (56,160 acres) is on land, with a further 4,594 ha (11,350 acres) being marine (i.e. below low tide level).

== History ==
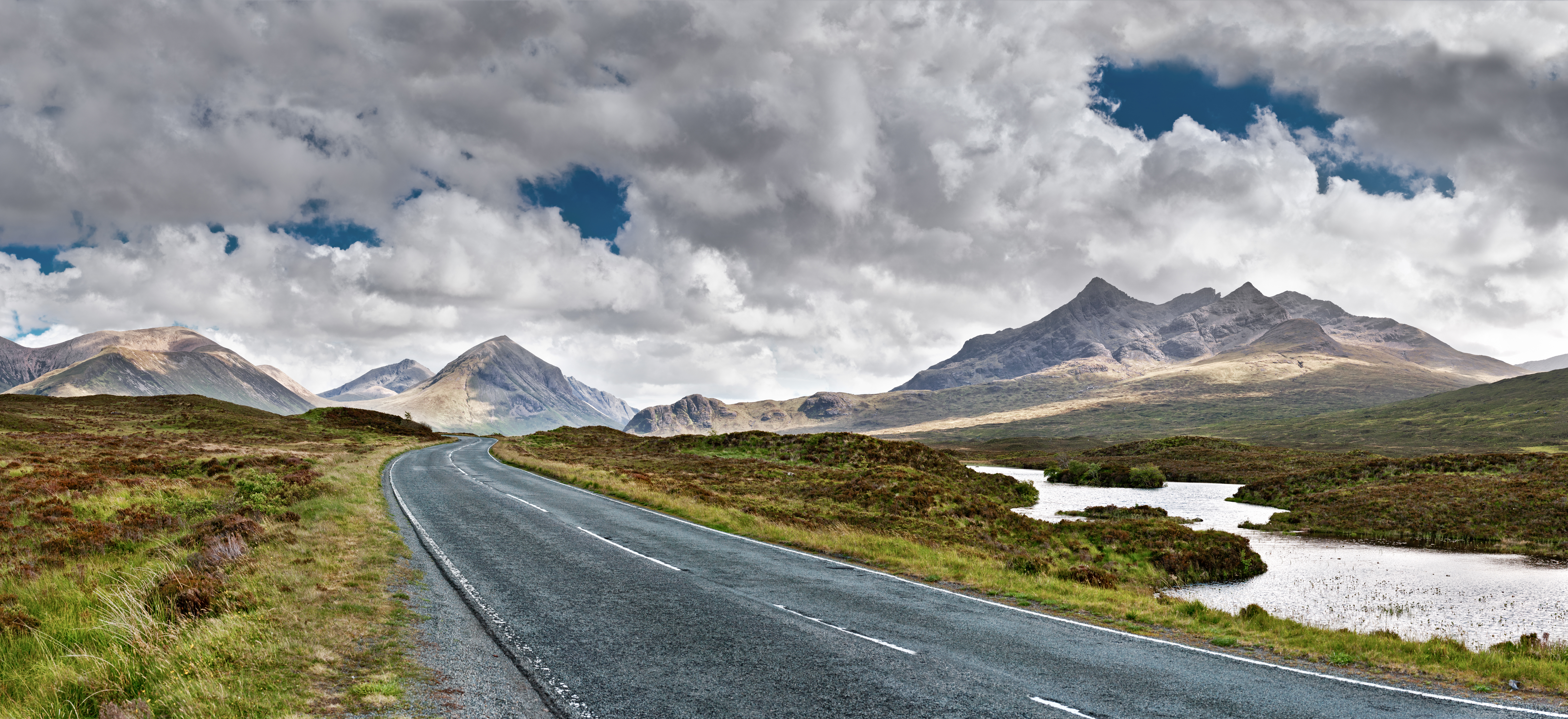
Views of the Cuillin Mountains on the A863 towards Sligachan on the Isle of Skye, Scotland.

Due to the rocky nature of the Cuillin they have historically been of little use for agriculture: this contrasts with the majority of the highlands, where the hills were used to provide seasonal grazing for cattle and sheep. Despite the lack of earlier human presence in the hills themselves, there is much evidence of historic settlement in the surrounding glens, with prehistoric hut circles found in Glenbrittle, and a stone circle identified in Glen Sligachan. Rubha an Dùnain, an uninhabited peninsula to the south of the main ridge, has a variety of archaeological sites dating from the Neolithic onwards. There is a 2nd or 3rd millennium BC chambered cairn, an Iron Age promontory fort and the remains of another prehistoric settlement dating from the Bronze Age nearby. Loch na h-Airde on the peninsula is linked to the sea by an artificial "Viking" canal that may date from the later period of Norse settlement.

The Norse held sway throughout the Hebrides from the 9th century until after the Treaty of Perth in 1266. In the post–Norse period the most powerful clans on Skye were Clan MacLeod, originally based in Trotternish, and Clan Macdonald of Sleat. Following the disintegration of the Lordship of the Isles, the Mackinnons also emerged as an independent clan, whose substantial landholdings in Skye were centred on Strathaird. The MacDonalds and the MacLeods were bitter rivals, and two major battles of this period were fought between the clans at Harta Corrie and Coire Na Creich in the Cuillin:

- In 1395 a force of MacDonald clansmen landed at Loch Eynort, and headed north along Glen Sligachan, intending to invade MacLeod land. They were met by a force of MacLeods at Harta Corrie, below Sgùrr nan Gillean at the head of Glen Sligachan. The battle was a victory for the MacDonalds, who "fought the entire day till not one Macleod was left, and the bodies of the slain were piled round the base of a huge rock, topped by a Rowan tree and still called the 'Bloody Stone'" according to MEM Donaldson.
- The Battle of Coire Na Creiche, the last Scottish clan battle fought on Skye, was fought on the slopes below Bruach na Frìthe, near the head of Glenbrittle in 1601. The MacDonalds of Sleat defeated the MacLeods after a bitter feud.

Boswell and Johnson visited Skye during their tour of the Western Isles in 1773, and observed snow falling on the summits of the range in September. Boswell described the Cuillin as "a prodigious range of mountains, capped with rocks like pinnacles in a strange variety of shapes".

Uniquely for a group of Scottish mountains there are no records of the majority of the Cuillin summits having been climbed prior to the start of mountaineering as a leisure activity in the Victorian era, a situation reflected in the fact that around half the summits had no recorded name prior to this period, although names for corries and other features were in existence. Many of the summits are thus named after early climbers such as John MacKenzie (Sgùrr MhicChoinnich), Alexander Nicolson (Sgùrr Alasdair), and Norman Collie (Sgùrr Thormaid).

=== Ownership ===
The Cuillin now consists of two estates divided by Glen Sligachan. The hills on the west side of Glen Sligachan (the Black Cuillin) remained the property of Clan MacLeod despite the long history of conflict between them and Clan MacDonald. The earliest formal record of MacLeod ownership was in a land grant from the Crown in 1611. In 2000 the Cuillin were put on sale for £10 million by the clan chief, John MacLeod of MacLeod, in a scheme of land in exchange for repairs to Dunvegan Castle, however there was a dispute over ownership, as opponents of the sale argued that the charter referred to the MacLeod's Tables which stand across the loch from Dunvegan Castle and not to the Cuillin themselves. A deal was cut for the property to be gifted in return for repairs to the clan castle, although it later fell through, with opponents arguing that the cost was out of proportion compared to other equivalent land sales. Following the death of John MacLeod in 2007 his successor, Hugh Magnus MacLeod of MacLeod, found alternative funding sources, and as of 2017 ownership of the main range remains in the MacLeod family. However, the ownership rights of the Black Cuillins by the MacLeods remains controversial.

The Strathaird, Torrin and Sconser Estate lies on the eastern side of Glen Sligachan, encompassing the Red Cuillin and Bla Bheinn: it is owned by the John Muir Trust, a charity that seeks to protect and enhance wild places. Strathaird Estate was formerly owned by musician Ian Anderson, the frontman for Jethro Tull, who sold the estate to the trust in 1994, for around £750,000.

== Climbing and hillwalking ==
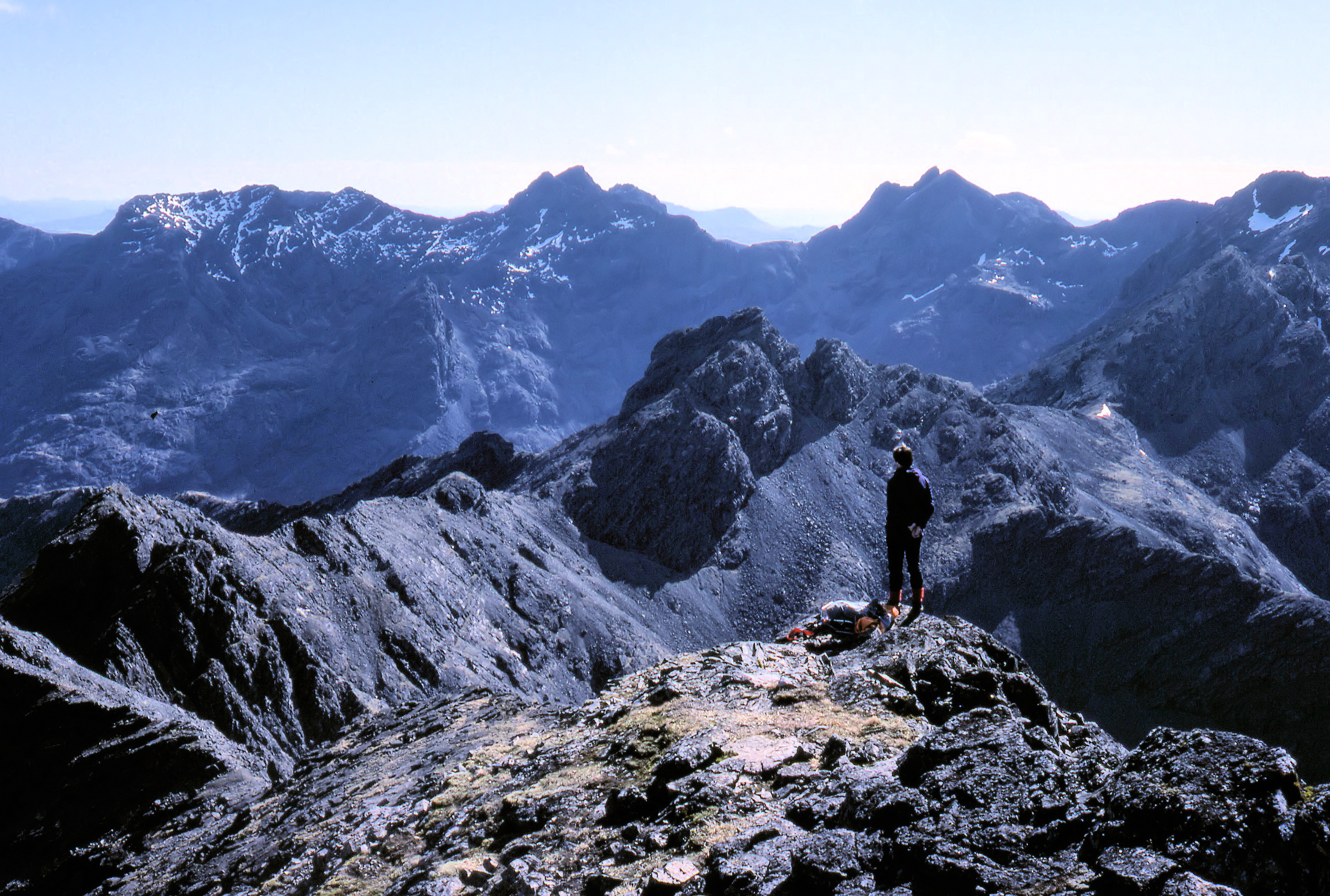
The main ridge

The summits of the Cuillin are bare rock, jagged in outline and with steep cliffs and deep cut corries and gullies. Twelve Black Cuillin peaks are listed as Munros, though one of them, Blaven, is part of a group of outliers separated from the main ridge by Glen Sligachan.

The scrambler can access most of the individual peaks by their easiest routes. Only the Inaccessible Pinnacle is a graded rock climb (Moderate) by its simplest line but several of the other summits require scrambling skills. Navigation on the ridge is difficult due to jagged terrain and magnetic abnormalities that make compass reading unreliable. The majority of scramblers heading on to the Black Cuillin do so via routes from Glenbrittle (where there is a campsite and a youth hostel) or Sligachan for the northern peaks: due to the remoteness of Loch Coruisk, which can only be reached by boat or a c. 10 km (6.2 mi) walk from Elgol, routes starting from this side are less frequented.

Sketch map of main Black Cuillin ridge

In addition to climbing individual peaks, there is the challenge of a full mountain traverse of the main Black Cuillin ridge. Although only 11 km (7 mi) in length, the average traverse is likely to take 15–20 hours from sea level at Glenbrittle to the bar of the Sligachan Hotel, owing to the difficulty of the terrain and route-finding problems. The first recorded traverse in under 24 hours was on 10 June 1911 by Leslie Shadbolt and Alastair C. McLaren, in 12 hours 18 minutes top to top (16.75 hours in total). The record for the full traverse, set by Finlay Wild in October 2013, stands at 2 hours, 59 minutes and 22 seconds (though this time is from Gars-bheinn to Sgùrr nan Gillean and does not include the initial ascent from Glenbrittle or the final descent to Sligachan). A further issue for those attempting the full traverse is the fact that there are no natural sources of water on the ridge (except for winter snows and melt water), although there are a few high burns just off the main ridge from which water can be obtained.

Some believe the ultimate mountaineering experience of the UK is the full traverse of the Cuillin Ridge, especially under winter conditions. The Isle of Skye's position in the warm Gulf Stream makes genuine winter conditions rare, and the very short winter days probably make a 24-hour traverse impractical. The first recorded, over two days, was in 1965 by D. Crabbe, B. Robertson, T. Patey and H. MacInnes.

A longer challenge, known as the "Greater Traverse" includes all the Skye Munros, though omitting some gabbro outliers: this involves continuing on to Clach Glas and Blaven totalling some 20 km (12 mi) distance and 4,000 m (13,000 ft) ascent. This traverse was first done independently by two parties, in the summer of 1939, with I. Charleson and W. Forde claiming precedence over W. H. Murray & R. G. Donaldon a few weeks later (see W. H. Murray's book for details of his traverse).

Extending the Greater Traverse even further is the Cuillin Round. This takes in most of the major peaks of the Black and Red Cuillin, totalling 54 km (34 mi), 7,000 m (23,000 ft) ascent and 12 Munros. The fastest time of 16 hours 46 minutes was set by Mark Shaw in 2002.

The Trans Cuillin Challenge is yet to be completed in under 24 hours. It is an east-west traverse of every Cuillin top between Gars-bheinn and Beinn na Caillich, totalling some 61 km (38 mi), 9,000 m (30,000 ft) ascent and 70 tops.

=== List of summits ===
The list below shows all the Munros, Corbetts and Grahams of the Cuillin. It, therefore, excludes peaks such as Clach Glas, which do not meet the criteria for these hill listings.

Summit	Range	Classification	Absolute height (m)	Relative height (m)	Grade of easiest route	Easiest route(s)
Sgùrr nan Gillean	Black Cuillin	Munro	964	c. 204	Grade 3 scramble	South-east ridge
Am Basteir	Black Cuillin	Munro	934	c. 55	Grade 2 scramble	East ridge avoiding the "Broken Step" on the left
Bruach na Frìthe	Black Cuillin	Munro	958	c. 125	Walk	Ascent via Fionn Choire
Sgùrr a' Mhadaidh	Black Cuillin	Munro	918	c. 71	Grade 2/3 scramble	North-west or south ridges
Sgùrr a' Ghreadaidh	Black Cuillin	Munro	973	c. 123	Grade 3 scramble	North ridge
Sgùrr na Banachdaich	Black Cuillin	Munro	965	c. 114	Walk	Ascent via Coire nan Eich
Inaccessible Pinnacle (Sgùrr Dearg)	Black Cuillin	Munro	986	182	Moderate rock climb	East ridge of Inaccessible Pinnacle
Sgùrr MhicChoinnich	Black Cuillin	Munro	948	c. 56	Grade 2 scramble	North ridge
Sgùrr Alasdair	Black Cuillin	Munro	992	992	Grade 2 scramble	North-east ridge from top of Great Stone Chute
Sgùrr Dubh Mòr	Black Cuillin	Munro	944	c. 89	Grade 2 scramble	From Coir' a' Ghrunnda
Sgùrr nan Eag	Black Cuillin	Munro	924	c. 127	Grade 1/2 scramble	From Coir' a' Ghrunnda
Blà Bheinn	Outlier (Blaven group)	Munro	928	301	Walk	Ascent via Coire Uaigneis
Garbh-bheinn	Outlier (Blaven group)	Corbett	808	172	Walk	From head of Loch Ainort
Glamaig	Red Cuillin	Corbett	775	c. 480	Walk	From Sligachan
Marsco	Red Cuillin	Graham	736	413	Walk	From Sligachan
Beinn Dearg Mhòr	Red Cuillin	Graham	731	152	Walk	From Sligachan
Belig	Red Cuillin	Graham	702	246	Walk	From head of Loch Ainort

== Cultural references ==
- The Cuillin is a key thematic device in the Gaelic-language family film Seachd: The Inaccessible Pinnacle.
- One of Sorley MacLean's best known poems is the epic An Cuillithionn ("The Cuillin").
- The song "The Road to the Isles" mentions the Cuillin in the first verse and in each chorus.
- The murder mystery novel Wildfire at Midnight by Mary Stewart is set in and around the Cuillin.
- The spy novel Mr Standfast by John Buchan has a chapter set around The Cuillin ("Coolins" in the book).
- The Inaccessible Pinnacle is the scene of a death in Val McDermid's Trick of the Dark.
- In the 2012 film Prometheus, archaeologists discover an ancient petroglyph star map on the Isle of Skye in the Cuillin Hills.
- The 2012 film Brave contains a song which refers to a legendary bear being "bigger than a Cuillin".
- In Jethro Tull's song "Broadford Bazaar", reference is made to "wee plastic Cuillins".
- The Black Cuillin Traverse is featured in episode 2 of Running Wild with Bear Grylls.
- Trials cyclist Danny MacAskill, who grew up on the Isle of Skye, filmed the mountain bike edit The Ridge on the Cuillin.
- The Truth Is a Cave in the Black Mountains, an illustrated novella by Neil Gaiman and Eddie Campbell, features a legendary cave of gold in the Black Cuillin.
- There is a legend that the Cuillin are haunted by the ghost of an outlaw called MacRaing.

== Gallery ==
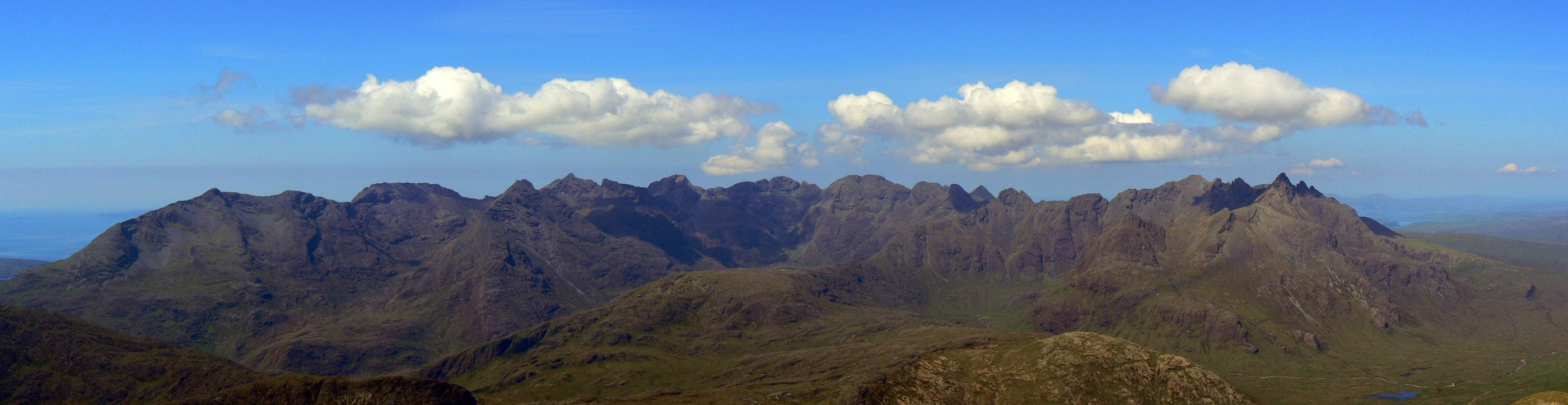
Panorama of the Black Cuillin from Blà Bheinn

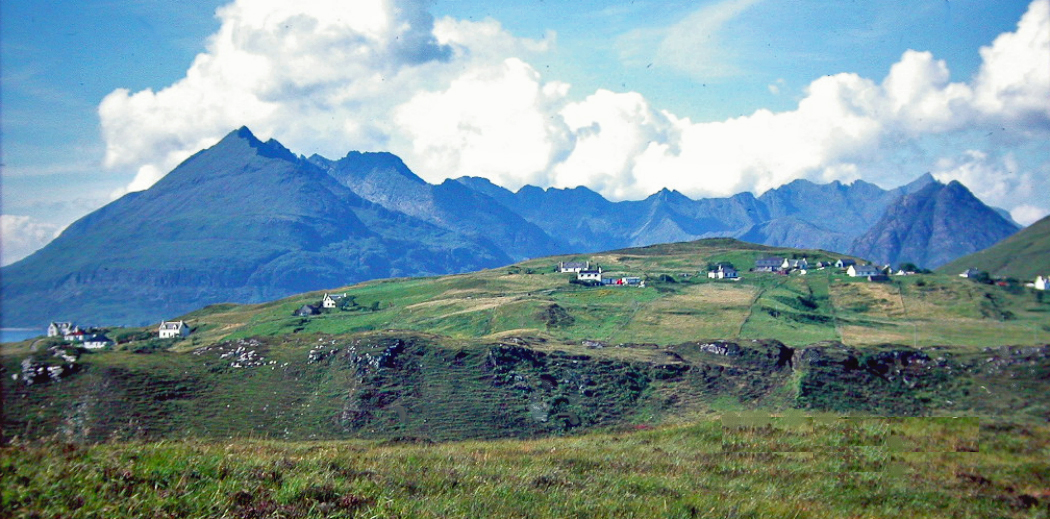
The Black Cuillin seen from Elgol

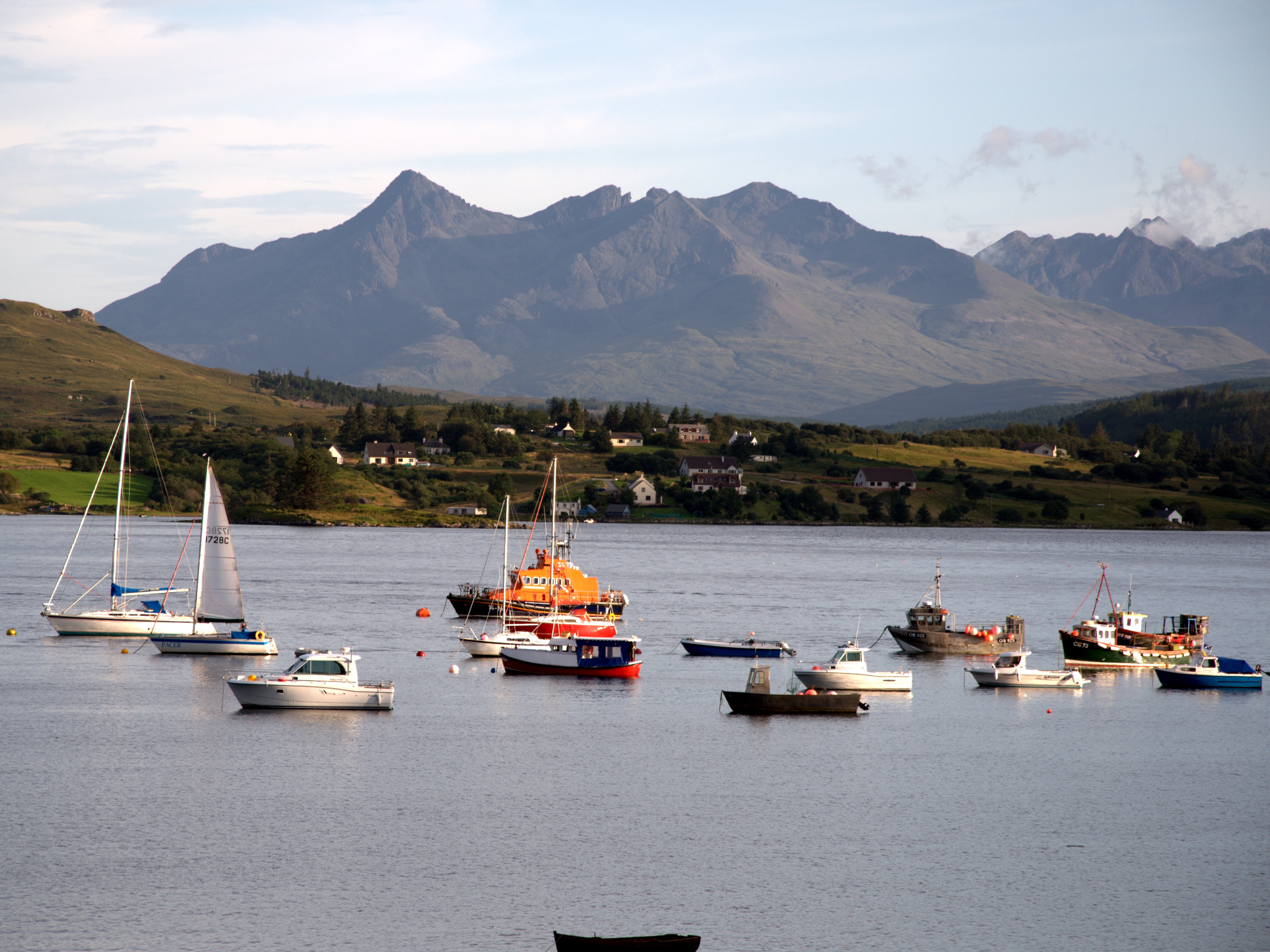
The north Cuillin viewed from Portree

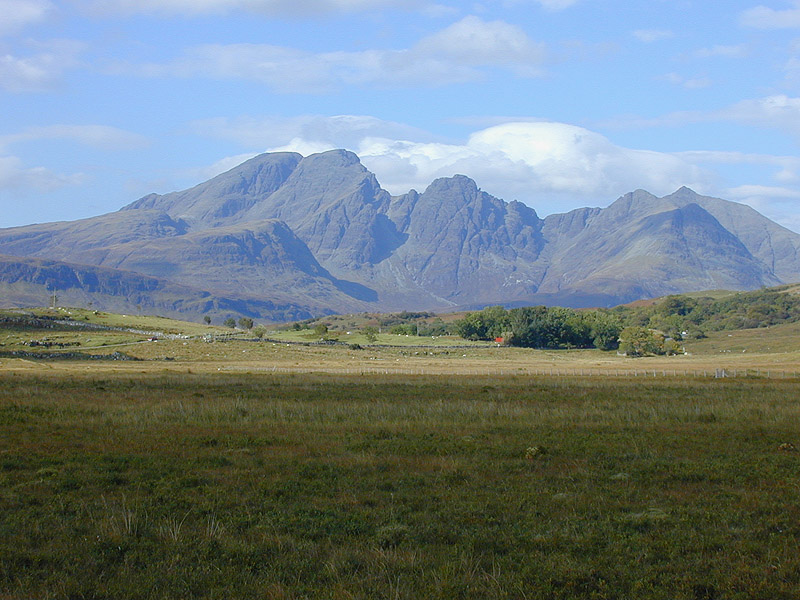
Blà Bheinn from Loch Slapin

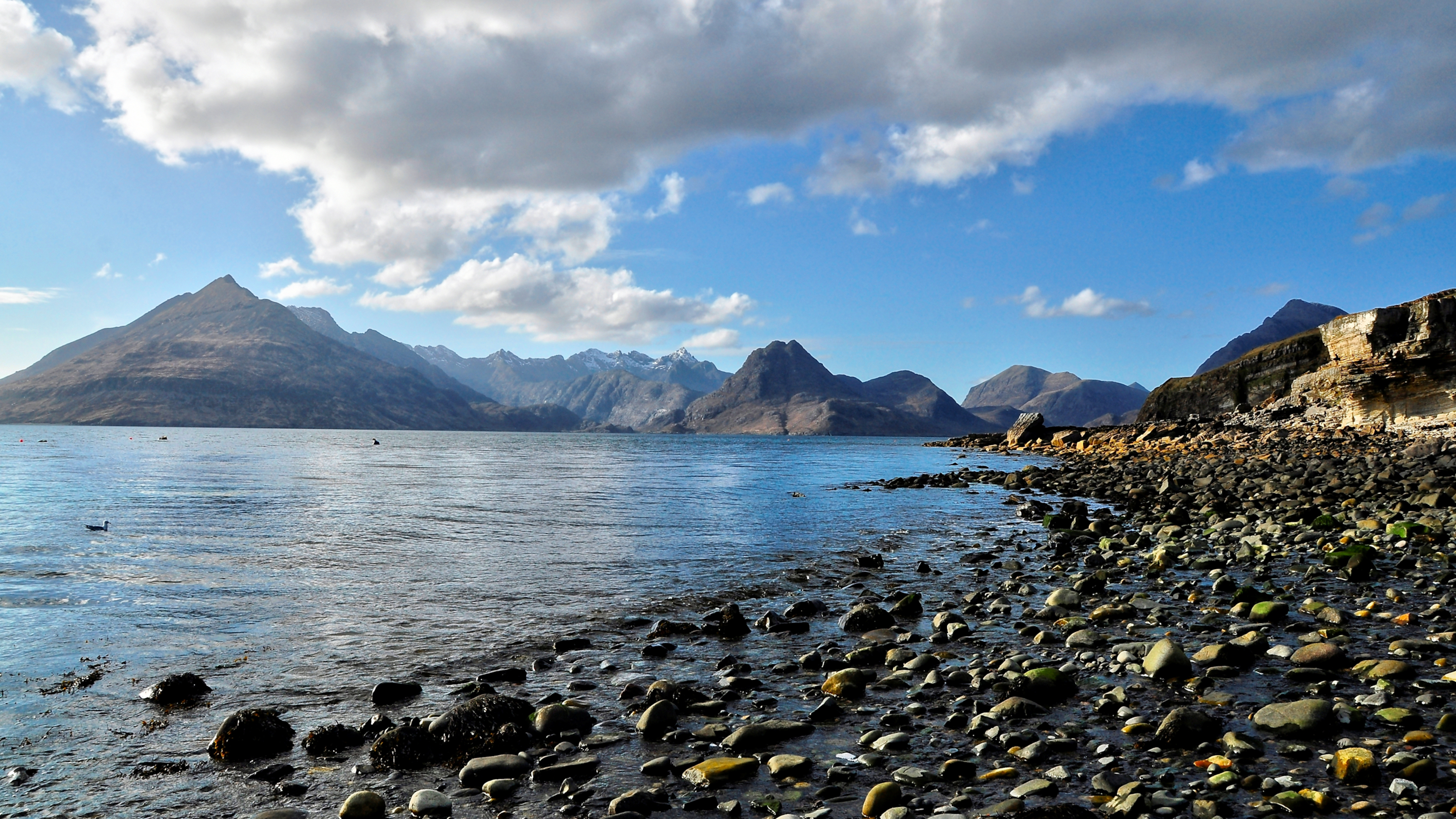
The Black Cuillin viewed from Loch Scavaig

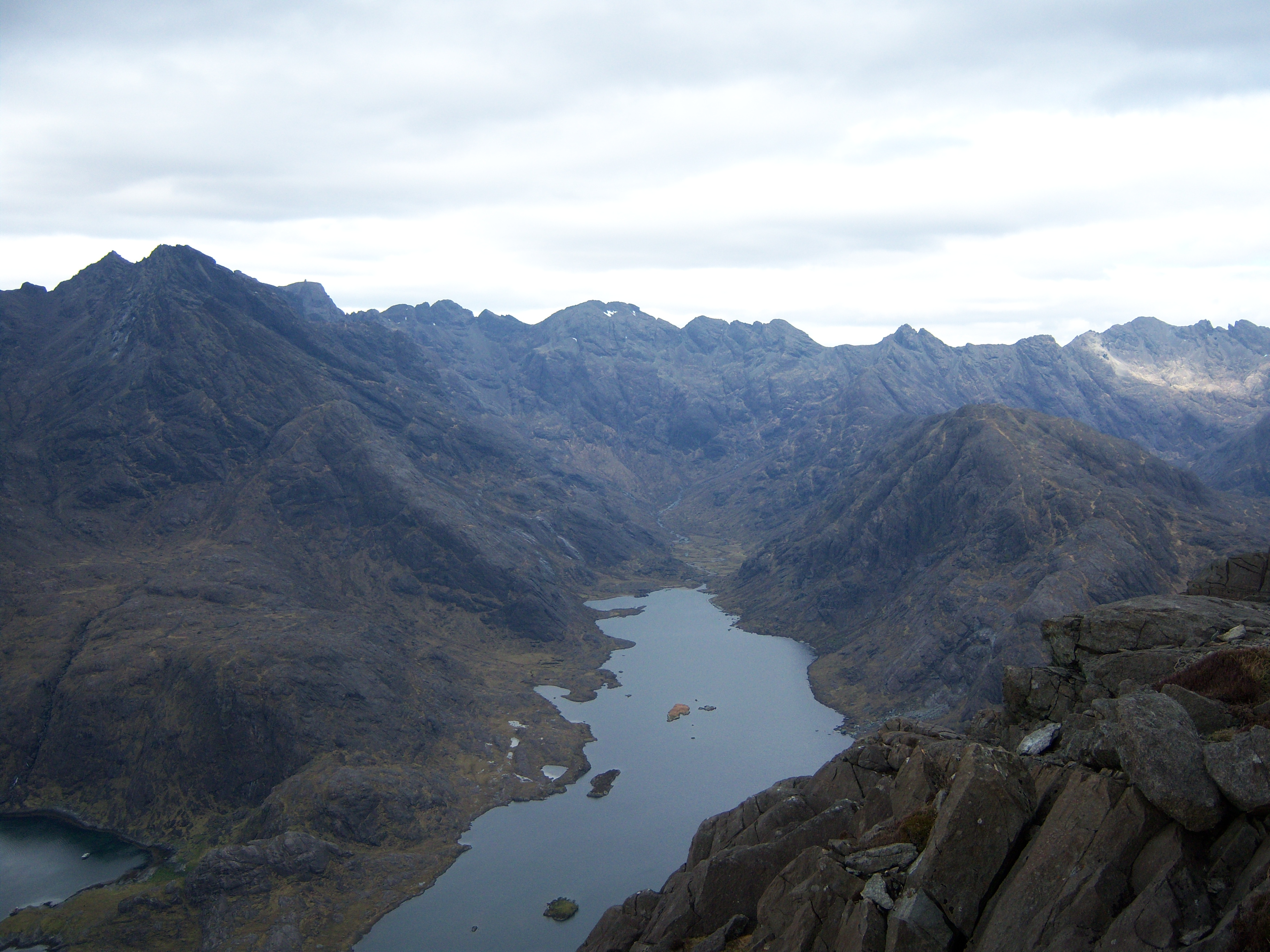
Loch Coruisk in the Cuillin

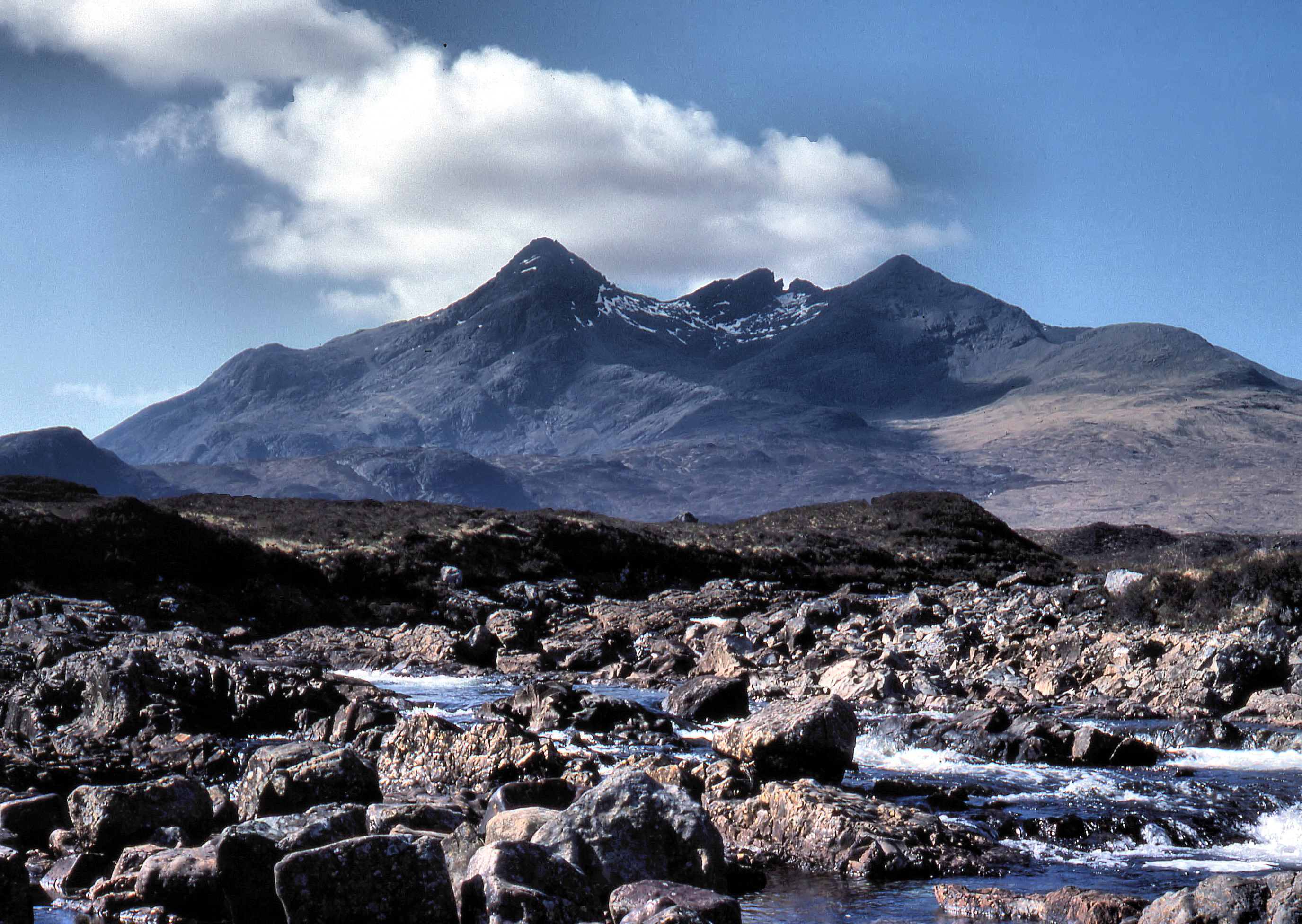
Sgùrr nan Gillean

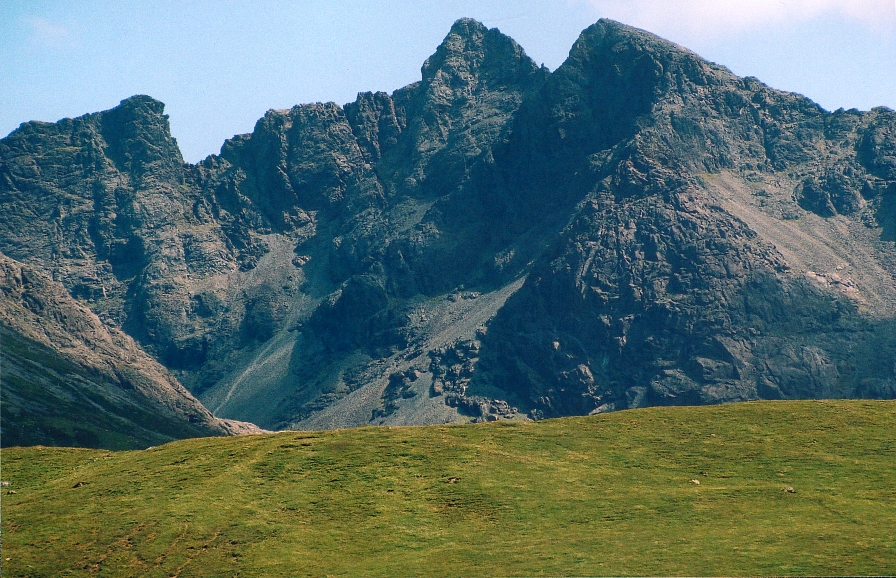
Sgùrr Alasdair, the highest peak

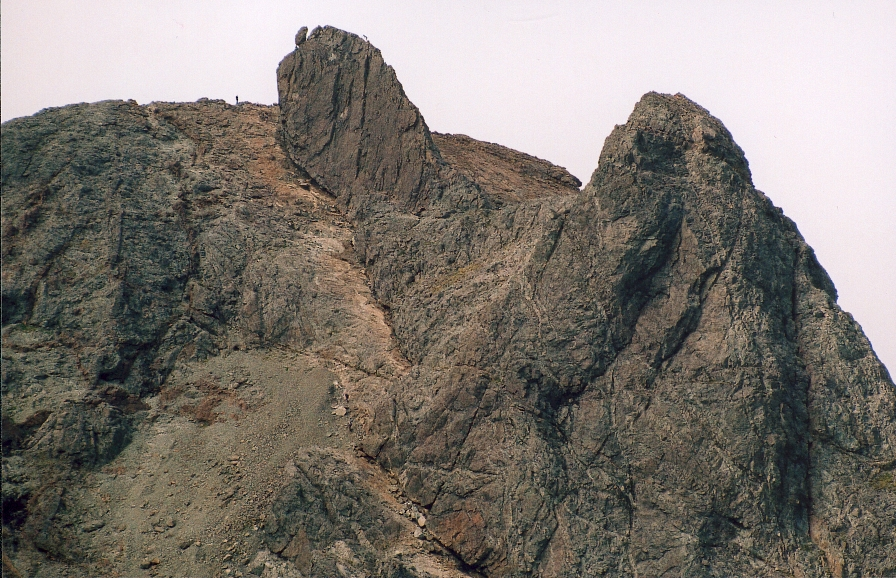
The 'Inaccessible Pinnacle', with climbers on the summit of Sgùrr Dearg

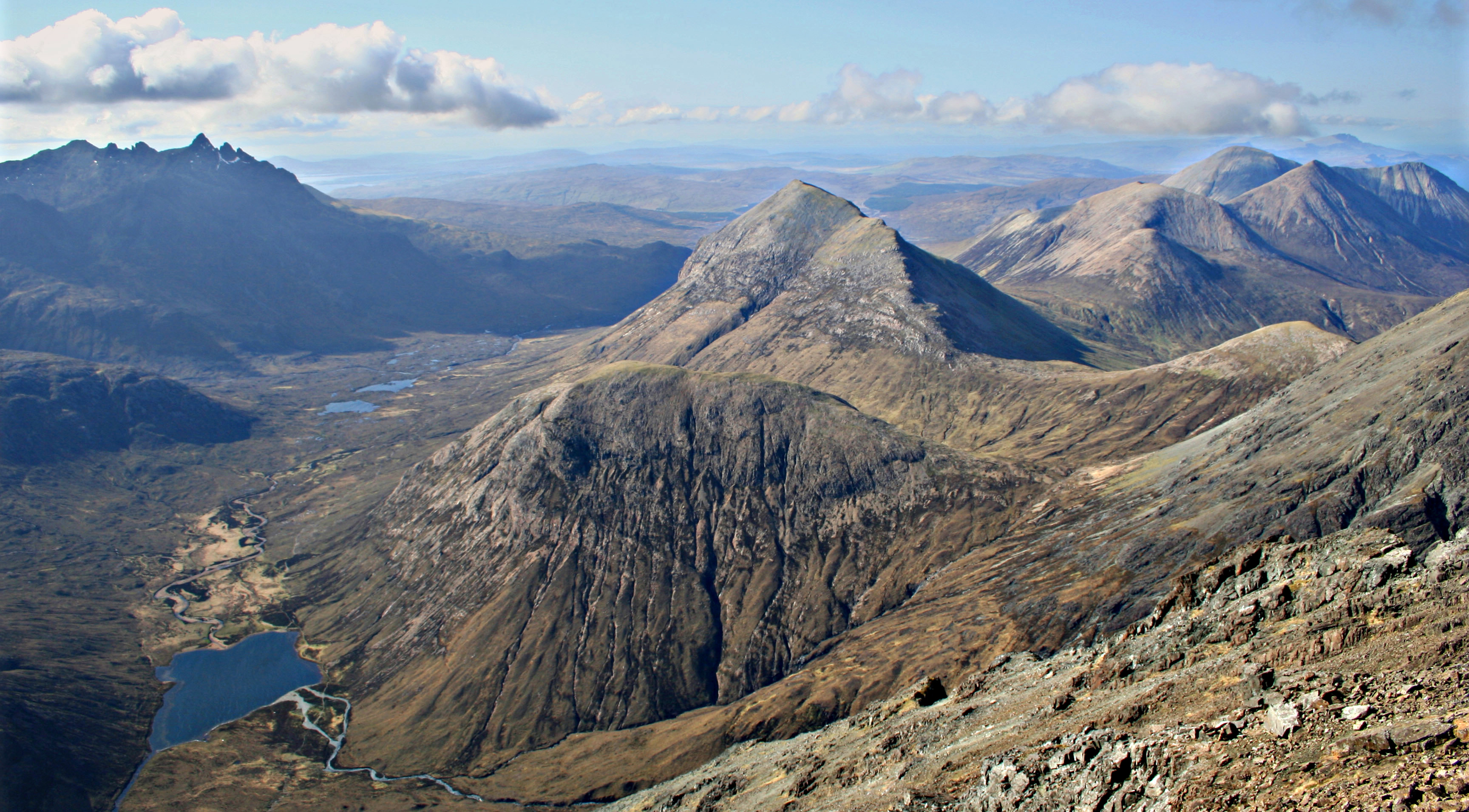
The Red Cuillin, with the Black Cuillin in the distance

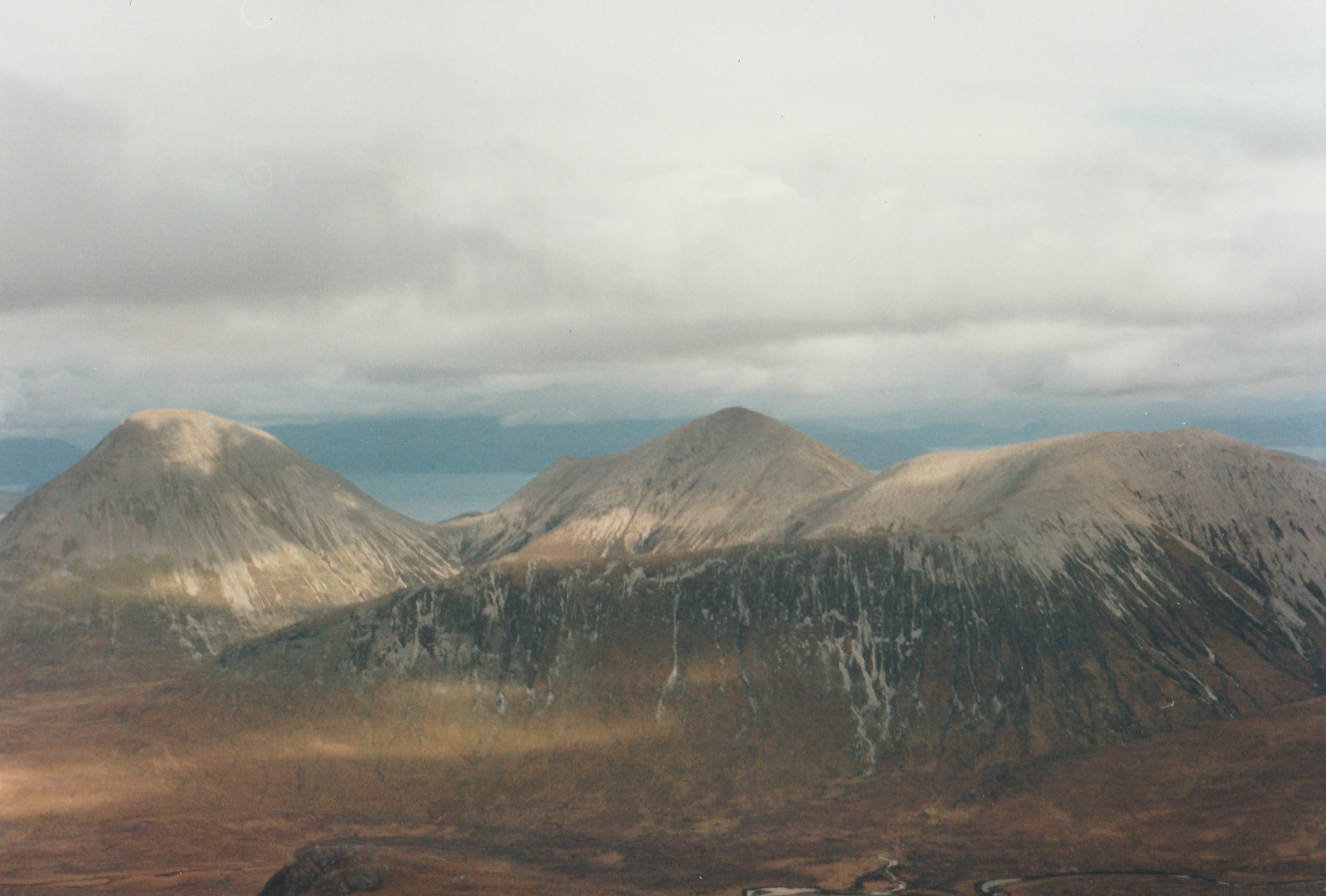
The Red Cuillin (Glamaig and An Coileach, Beinn Dearg Mòr, Drum na Ruaige)
