= Clach Glas =

Mountain in Scotland

Coordinates: 57.22301°N 6.08681°W

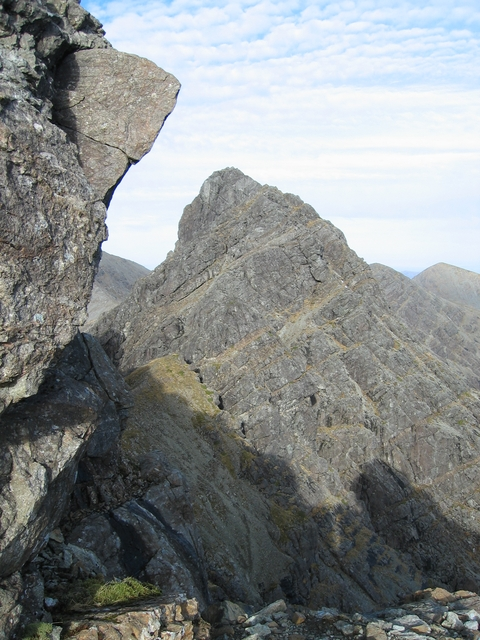
- Clach Glas viewed from Blaven

Highest point
- Elevation: 786 m (2,579 ft)
- Prominence: c. 91 m
- Parent peak: Blaven
- Listing: Corbett Top

Naming
- English translation: Grey/blue stone
- Language of name: Scottish Gaelic

Geography
- Location: Cuillin, Scotland
- OS grid: NG534221
- Topo map: OS Landranger 32

Climbing
- First ascent: 1888, Charles Pilkington and party
- Easiest route: scrambling (Easy–Moderate)

Clach Glas is a mountain on the Black Cuillin of the Isle of Skye, Scotland. Its elevation is 786 m (2,579 ft) and the name translates as The Grey Stone. It is often traversed as a sustained scrambling route to Blà Bheinn, mostly at a standard between Easy and Moderate, depending on the line followed (see Parker, routes 101 & 102). It is the penultimate mountain in the Greater Traverse of the Black Cuillin.

Ashley Abraham called it "the Matterhorn of Skye" (a description which is often still used).

According to some sources the first ascent of the top was probably not until 1888 by Charles Pilkington and party.
