= Glamaig =

Mountain in Scotland

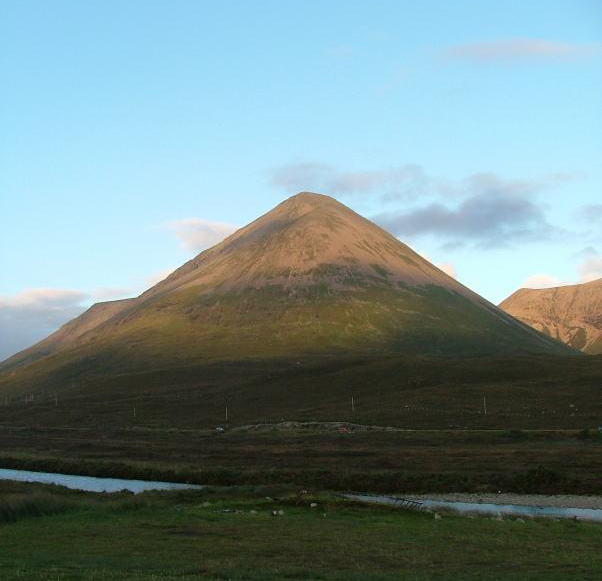
- Glamaig seen from Sligachan

Highest point
- Elevation: 775 m (2,543 ft)
- Prominence: 486 metres (1,594 ft)
- Listing: Corbett, Marilyn
- Coordinates: 57°17′34″N 6°07′43″W

Naming
- English translation: Greedy woman
- Language of name: Gaelic
- Pronunciation: /ˈɡlæmɛk/

Geography
- Location: Skye, Scotland
- Parent range: Red Hills
- OS grid: NG514301
- Topo map: Ordnance Survey Landranger 32

Listed summits of Glamaig
Name	Grid ref	Height	Status
Sgurr Mhàiri	NG513300	775 m	Corbett, Marilyn
An Coileach	NG524305	673 m	Graham Top

Glamaig (Scottish Gaelic: Glàmaig) is the northernmost of the Red Hills on the Isle of Skye in Scotland. It lies immediately east of Sligachan. It is one of only two Corbetts on Skye.

From many angles the hill resembles a perfect cone of scree, though it is linked to the rest of the Red Hills by way of a bealach, the Bealach na Sgàirde (Pass of the Scree).

In 1889, a Gurkha named Harkabir Tharpa scaled Glamaig in 37 minutes; his total time for the round trip, starting and finishing at sea level in the bar of the Sligachan Inn was 55 minutes. Legend has it that he ran it in bare feet, and his record stood until the 1980s, despite being attempted by Olympians such as Chris Brasher in the 1950s.

From Sligachan one route of ascent (whether running or hillwalking) is simply to head up the scree aiming for the summit - this climb is very arduous, due to the unrelenting gradient and the slipperiness of the scree. Descent may be made by way of ascent; alternatively one may continue along the Red Cuillin ridge to take in other peaks to the south.

A slightly less arduous (but longer) climb approaches the mountain from its eastern end at Sconser. Climb first to the secondary summit, An Coileach (The Cockerel), then follow the whaleback ridge to the primary summit, Sgurr Mhàiri (Mary's Peak). Once An Coileach is reached at 673 metres (2,208 ft), the more-or-less level ridge allows some respite from the gradient, with a gentler ascent of the final 102 metres (335 ft) to Sgurr Mhàiri.

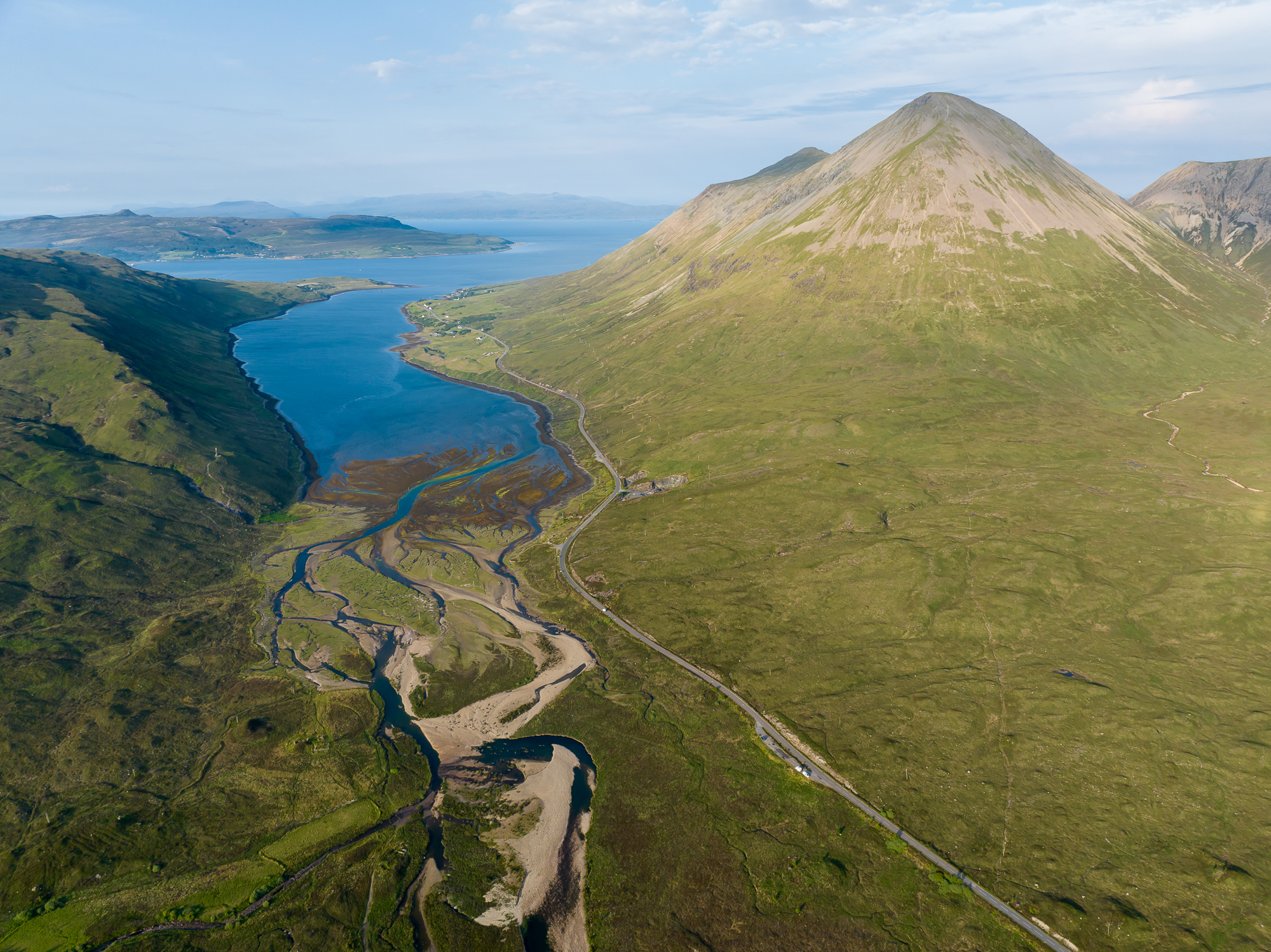
An aerial view of Glamaig reveals its stunning landscape

From the summit there are excellent views of both the Black Cuillin and the Isle of Raasay.

== Glamaig Hill Race ==
Glamaig has been the site of an annual hill race since the 1980s. It begins and finishes at the Sligachan Hotel. While in distance terms a relatively short Category S race covering a distance of 7 km, with 775m of ascent it falls into a Category A climb, and is one of the more challenging races on the Scottish circuit.
