= Bruach na Frìthe =

Summit on the Isle of Skye, Scotland

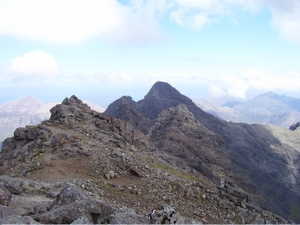

Highest point
- Elevation: 958 m (3,143 ft)
- Prominence: 125 m (410 ft)
- Listing: Munro
- Coordinates: 57°14′48″N 6°12′37″W

Naming
- English translation: Slope of the Deer Forest
- Language of name: Gaelic
- Pronunciation: Scottish Gaelic: [ˈpɾuəx nə ˈfɾʲiː.ə]

Geography
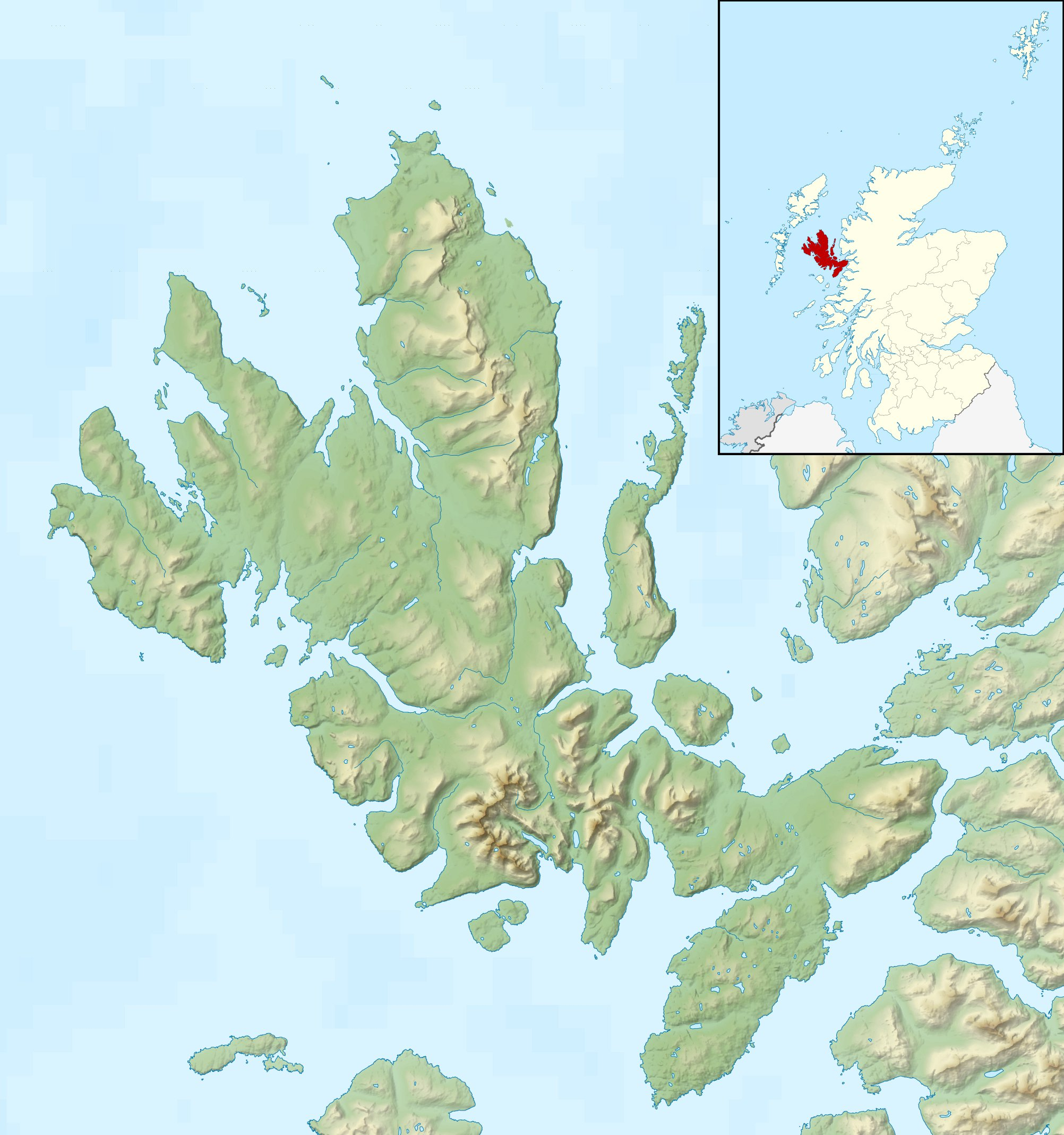
- Location within Isle of Skye
- Location: Skye, Scotland
- Parent range: Cuillin
- OS grid: NG461252
- Topo map: OS Landranger 32

Climbing
- First ascent: 1845, Prof J D Forbes
- Easiest route: Scramble

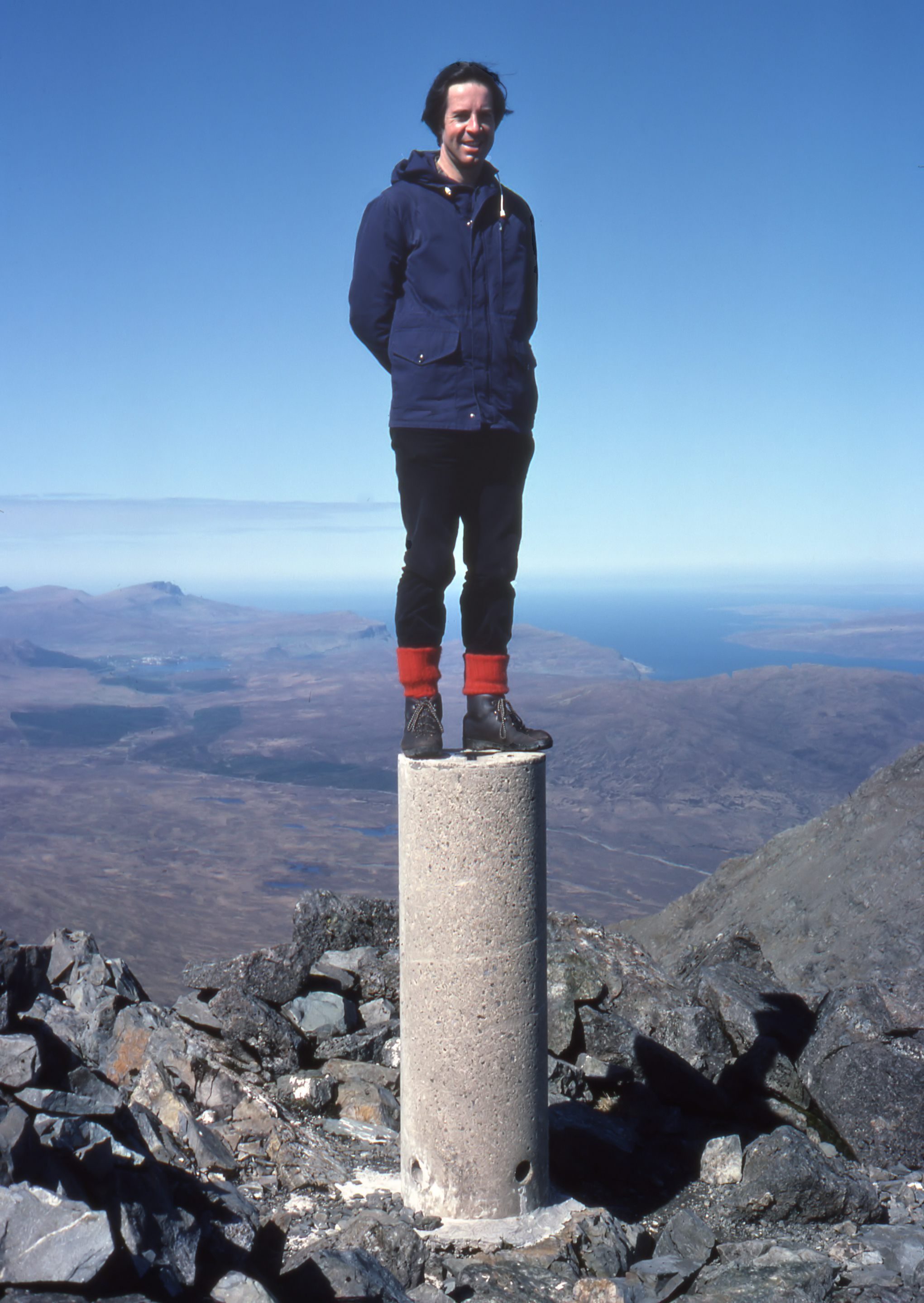
The summit trig point in 1976

Bruach na Frìthe is one of the principal summits on the Black Cuillin ridge, on the Isle of Skye, Scotland. Like the rest of the range it is composed of gabbro, a rock with excellent grip for mountaineering. The Bruach cannot be seen in the popular view from Sligachan - the right hand peak which is often mistaken for it is the lower Sgurr a' Bhasteir.

This is one of the easiest and probably the most ascended of the main Black Cuillin peaks, requiring no scrambling ability. The simplest route ascends via Fionn Coire, though the slightly harder Northwest Ridge is also a popular route. All routes cross steep ground and scree.

The summit is one of the best viewpoints in the Cuillin. Though not the highest peak in the range, it is the only one to have an Ordnance Survey pillar.
