= Blà Bheinn =

Mountain on the Isle of Skye, Scotland

- Blaven
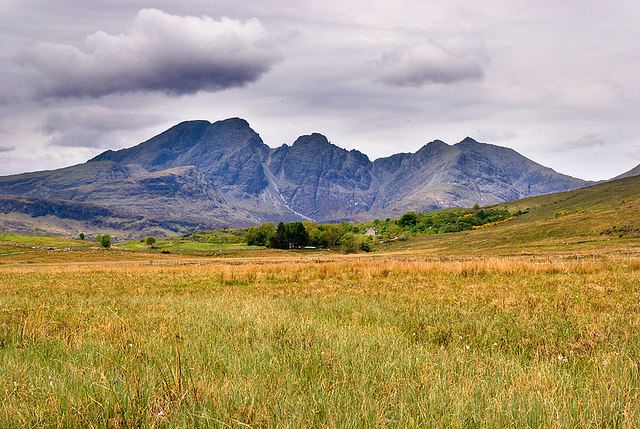
- From the east

Highest point
- Elevation: 929 m (3,048 ft)
- Prominence: 862 m (2,828 ft); Ranked 19th in British Isles
- Parent peak: Sgurr Alasdair
- Listing: Munro, Marilyn
- Coordinates: 57°13′11.76″N 6°5′28.03″W

Naming
- English translation: blue mountain
- Language of name: Norse/Gaelic
- Pronunciation: Scottish Gaelic: [ˈpl̪ˠaːveɲ]

Geography
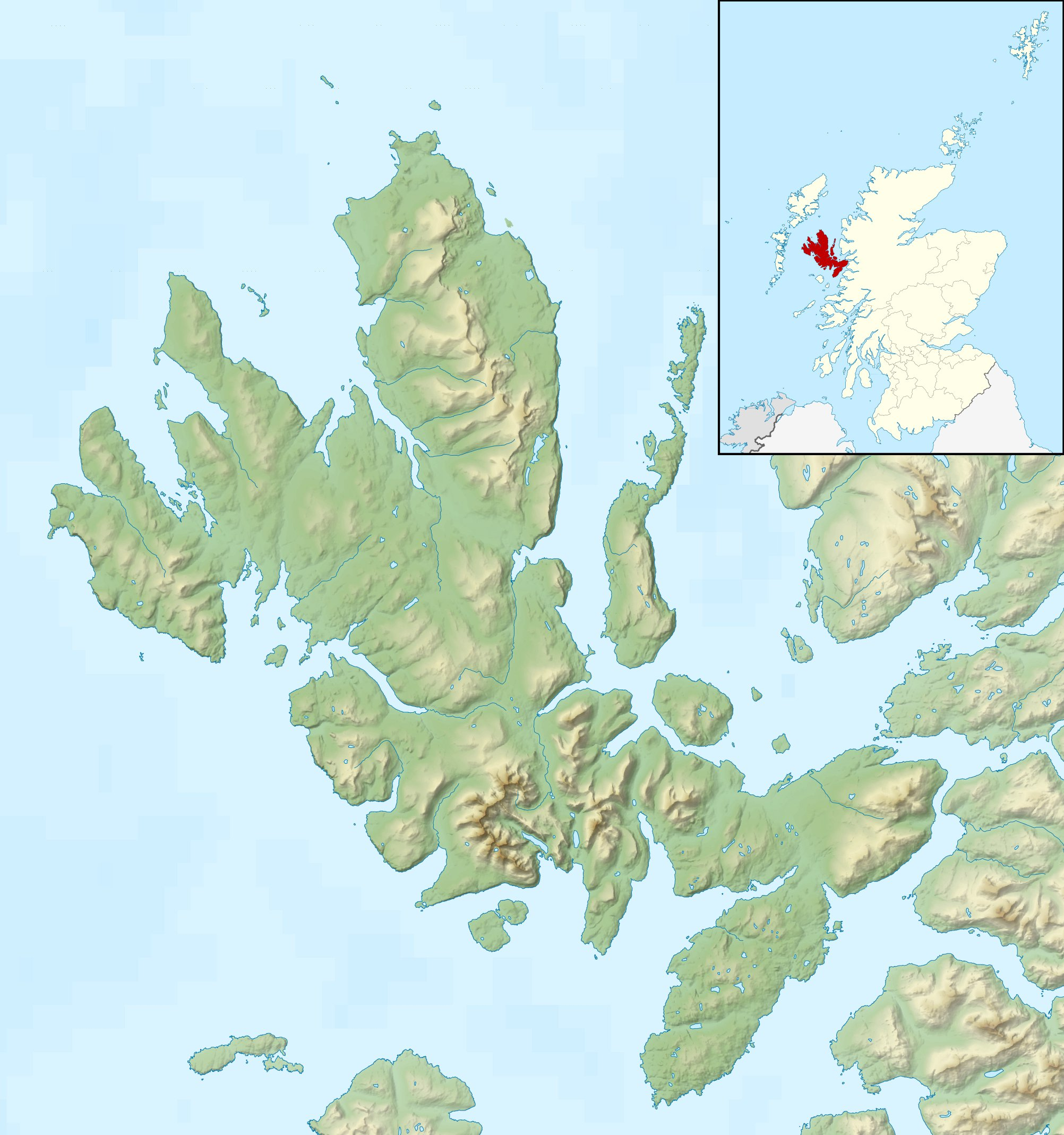
- Location within Isle of Skye
- Location: Skye, Scotland
- Parent range: Cuillin (outlier)
- OS grid: NG530217
- Topo map: OS Landranger 32

Blà Bheinn or Blàbheinn, also known as Blaven, is a mountain on the Isle of Skye in Scotland. It is usually regarded as an outlier of the Black Cuillin range. It is a Munro with a height of 929 metres (3,048 ft). North of the summit is the ridge of Clach Glas, which leads to the peaks of Garbh-bheinn (808 m) and Sgùrr nan Each (720 m). It is mainly composed of gabbro, a rock with excellent grip for mountaineers and scramblers.

The name Blà Bheinn is thought to mean "blue mountain", from a combination of Norse and Gaelic. Whereas blå in Modern Norwegian means "blue", the Old Norse word blá could, however, also refer to the colours blue-black and black.

The normal route of ascent for walkers is from the east. A path leaves the B8083 on the shores of Loch Slapin about 4 km after the village of Torrin. The path follows a burn, the Allt na Dunachie, into the corrie of Coire Uaigneich. From here a short steep route along the ridge leads to the summit. A small amount of scrambling is needed to reach the true top of the mountain. Alternative routes follow the south ridge, or come from the north having traversed the Clach Glas ridge which links to the Red Cuillin peaks.

Blaven stands in the Strathaird Estate, owned and managed since 1994 by the John Muir Trust.

== Geology ==
Blà Bheinn is geologically distinct from much of the surrounding Red Cuillin range, as it is composed predominantly of gabbro, a coarse-grained igneous rock known for its rough texture and excellent grip for climbers. This rock type is also found in the nearby Black Cuillin, linking Blà Bheinn geologically to that more rugged mountain range.

The mountain is part of the deeply eroded root system of an extinct central volcano that was active during the Paleogene period, around 60 million years ago. At that time, the region experienced intense volcanic activity associated with the opening of the North Atlantic Ocean. Blà Bheinn, like the rest of the Cuillin Hills, represents the solidified magma chamber of this ancient volcano, long since stripped of its upper volcanic cone by erosion.

The surrounding landscape shows additional evidence of glacial sculpting during the last Ice Age, with steep corries, U-shaped valleys, and erratics common throughout the area.

Blà Bheinn’s composition makes it popular among geologists, climbers, and hikers alike, offering both scientific interest and challenging ascents across its sharp ridges and scree-covered slopes.

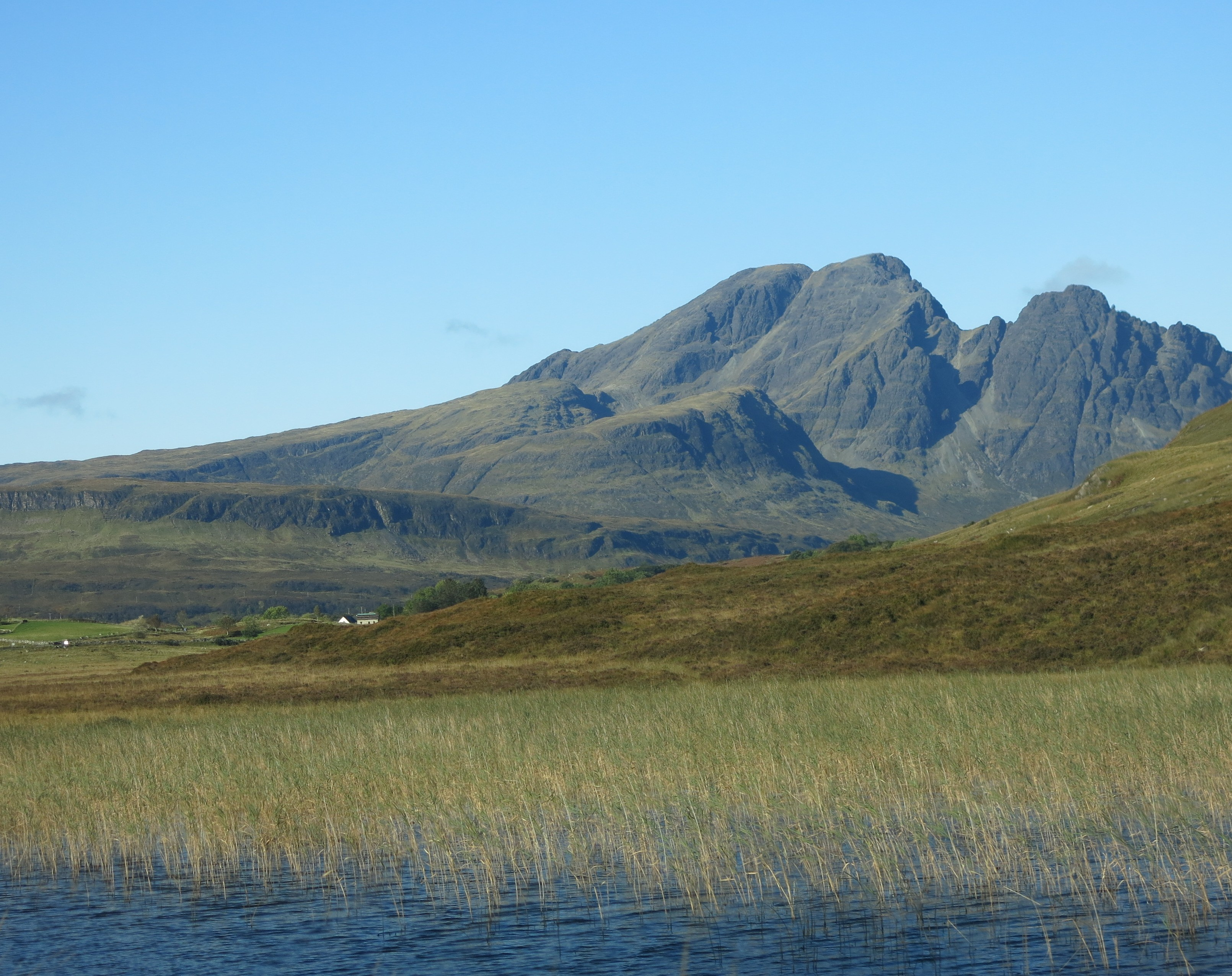
Blàbheinn from the east

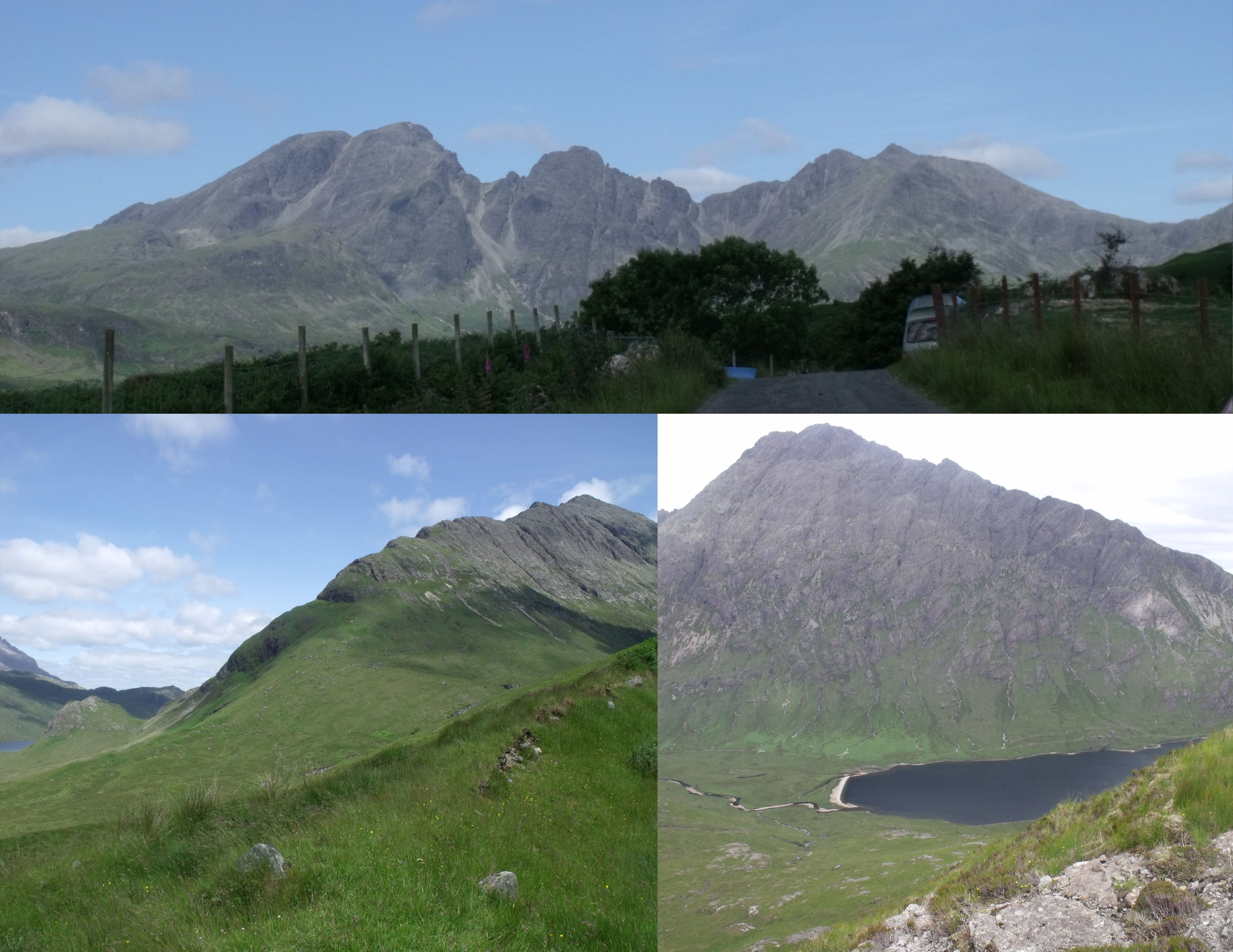
The mountain from three sides

== In popular culture ==
Blaven is depicted in Mary Stewart's 1956 thriller novel Wildfire at Midnight.
