= Alexander Nicolson =

Scottish lawyer and man of letters

Alexander Nicolson (Scottish Gaelic: Alasdair MacNeacail) (1827–1893) was a Scottish lawyer and man of letters, known as a Gaelic scholar and sheriff-substitute of Kirkcudbright and Greenock, and as a pioneer of mountain climbing in Scotland.

== Life ==
The son of Malcolm Nicolson, he was born at Husabost in Skye on 27 September 1827. With an early education from tutors, he entered Edinburgh University after the death of his father, intending to study for the ministry of the Free Church of Scotland. He graduated B.A. in 1850, and later in 1859 received an honorary degree of M.A. In the absence through illness of Sir William Hamilton, Nicolson as his assistant lectured for his class on logic, and for two years he performed a similar service for Patrick Campbell Macdougall in the class of moral philosophy.

Giving up theology while at the Free Church College, Nicholson for some time worked as one of the sub-editors of the eighth edition of the Encyclopædia Britannica. He moved on, to the staff of the Edinburgh Guardian, a short-lived literary paper of high literary quality. For a year he edited an advanced Liberal paper, the Daily Express, which later was merged into the Caledonian Mercury.

Nicolson was called in 1860 to the Scottish bar. With little practice, for ten years he reported law cases for the Scottish Jurist, of which he became editor. He acted as examiner in philosophy in the university, and examiner of births, etc., in Edinburgh and the neighbouring counties.

In 1865 Nicolson was appointed assistant commissioner by the Scottish education commission, in which capacity he visited widely in the Western Isles, inspected their schools, and reported in a detailed blue-book. In 1872 he accepted the office of sheriff-substitute of Kirkcudbright, declining the offer of the Celtic chair in Edinburgh University, set up largely by his own efforts and those of John Stuart Blackie. In 1880 he received the degree of LL.D. from Edinburgh University.

In 1883 Nicolson was one of the Napier Commission on the condition of the crofters. He was appointed to the Commission as an expert on Gaelic culture, rather than the law. The Commission's report made recommendations not only on land matters but also on education, where it suggested that the "Educational use of Gaelic should not only be permitted but enjoined". They argued that Gaelic should be made a "specific subject" in schools and eligible for grants. Although it was not publicly known at the time, these recommendations were the work of Nicolson. They met with total hostility from the Scottish Education Department and its inspectorate. Gaelic-medium education would have to wait for another 100 years. During the tour of investigation the gunboat HMS Lively, with the commissioners on board, sank off Stornoway, and he had some difficulty in saving the manuscript of his Memoirs of Adam Black, on which he was working at the time. In 1885 he became sheriff-substitute of Greenock, retiring in 1889, with a pension, on grounds of ill-health. He returned to Edinburgh, died suddenly at the breakfast table on 13 January 1893, and was buried in Warriston cemetery in Edinburgh.

== Interests ==
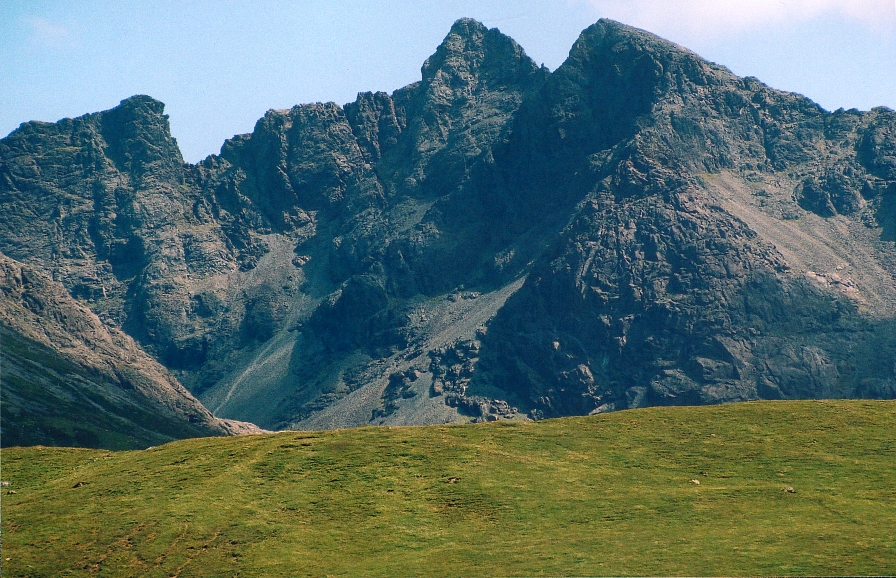
Sgùrr Alasdair

Nicolson was popular in society, being known for stories and songs, such as "The British Ass" and "Highland Regiments". He wrote: "I would rather be remembered as the composer of one good song, than as the writer of many respectable and superfluous books." His interest in climbing has seen him called "arguably the first modern mountaineer". He was a pioneer of climbing in the Cuillin hills of Skye, and in 1873 made the first recorded ascent of Sgùrr Alasdair, their highest peak, which is now named after him ("Alasdair" being a Gaelic form of "Alexander"). A member of the Scottish Mountaineering Club he is also credited with the first recorded ascent of Sgurr na Banachdich and Sgurr Dubh Mòr with the guide, John MacKenzie and with a possible winter first ascent of Sgurr nan Gillean. Credits for first ascents of British hills are very rare. He was also a keen athlete and a volunteer.

== Works ==
It is as a scholar of Scottish Gaelic that Nicolson has a lasting reputation, based mainly on his articles in The Gael, a Gaelic periodical, his collection of Gaelic proverbs, and his revised version of the Gaelic Bible, made for the Society in Scotland for Propagating Christian Knowledge. He was also a Greek scholar. His main publications were:

- The Lay of the Beanmhòr: a Song of the Sudreyar, Dunedin [Edinburgh], 1867.
- A Collection of Gaelic Proverbs and Familiar Phrases. Based on Macintosh's Collection. Edited by Alexander Nicolson, Edinburgh, 1881; 2nd edit. 1882. An updated version of the collection by Donald Macintosh. Still available: ISBN 9781841589831.
- Memoirs of Adam Black, Edinburgh, 1885; 2nd edit. 1885.
- Verses by Alexander Nicolson, LL.D., with a Memoir by Walter Chalmers Smith, Edinburgh, 1893.

Nicolson also edited in 1857 a volume Edinburgh Essays, written by a number of his friends connected with the university. He wrote articles and verse for Good Words, Macmillan's Magazine, Blackwood's Magazine, The Scotsman, and other periodicals and newspapers.

== Notes ==
Attribution

This article incorporates text from a publication now in the public domain: Lee, Sidney, ed. (1895). "Nicolson, Alexander". Dictionary of National Biography. Vol. 41. London: Smith, Elder & Co.
