= Sgùrr Alasdair =

Scottish islands' highest peak, 992 m (3,255 ft), UK's fifth most prominent peak

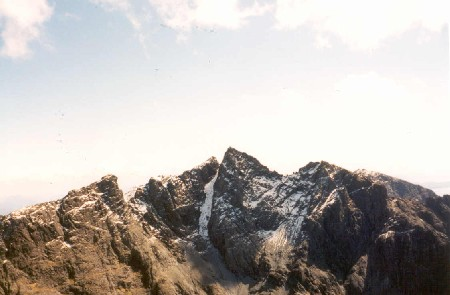

Highest point
- Elevation: 992 m (3,255 ft)
- Prominence: 992 m (3,255 ft); Ranked 5th in British Isles
- Parent peak: none - HP Skye
- Listing: Munro, Marilyn
- Coordinates: 57°12′25.39″N 6°13′24.55″W

Naming
- English translation: Alexander's peak
- Language of name: Gaelic
- Pronunciation: Scottish Gaelic: [s̪kurˠˈal̪ˠəs̪t̪ɪɾʲ]

Geography
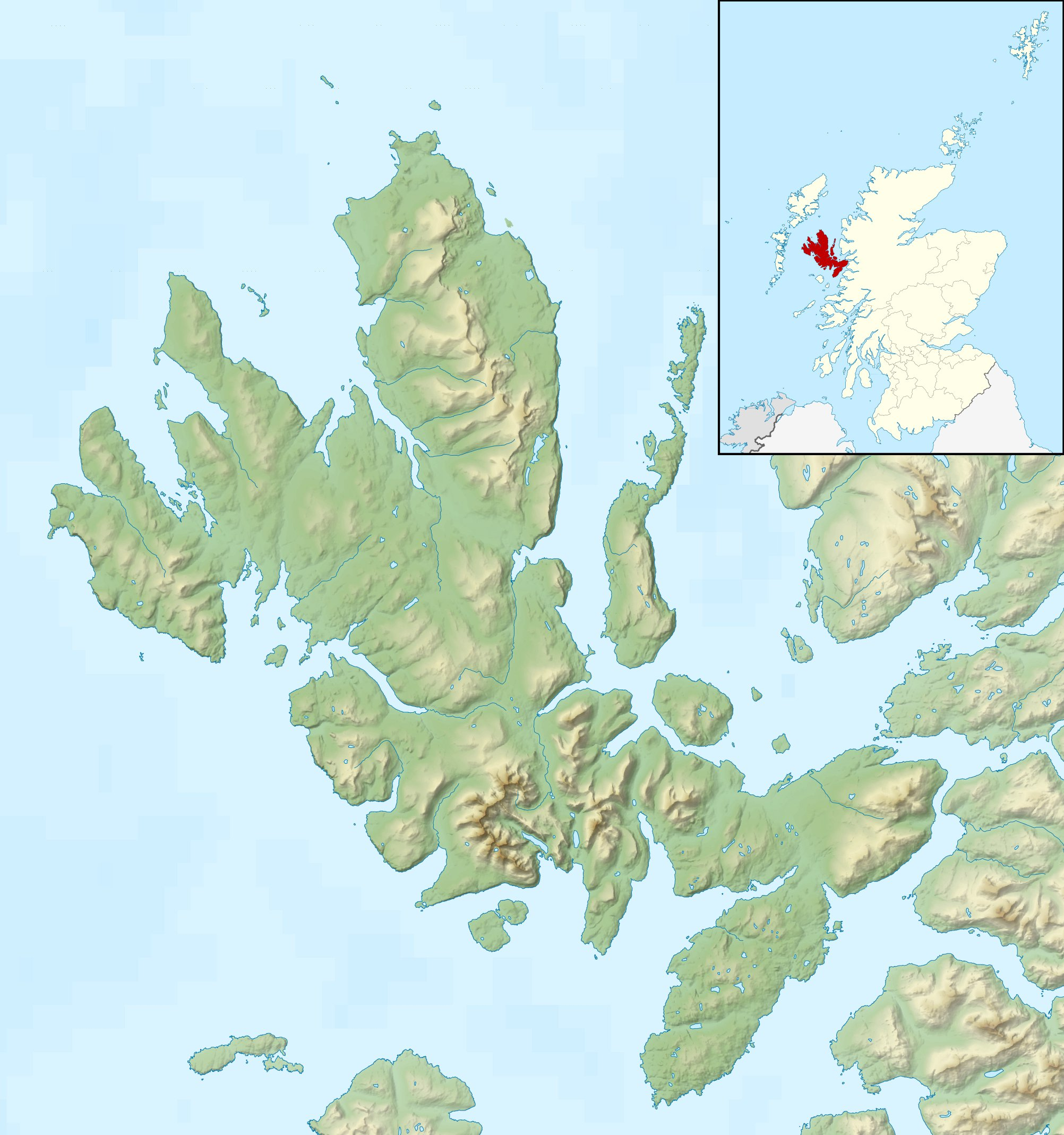
- Location within Isle of Skye
- Location: Skye, Scotland
- Parent range: Cuillin
- OS grid: NG450207
- Topo map: OS Landranger 32

Climbing
- First ascent: 1873, Alexander Nicolson
- Easiest route: Scramble

Sgùrr Alasdair (pronounced [s̪kurˠˈal̪ˠəs̪t̪ɪɾʲ]) is the highest peak of the Black Cuillin, and the highest peak on the Isle of Skye and in the Inner Hebrides, and indeed in all the Scottish islands, at 992 m (3,255 ft). Like the rest of the range it is composed of gabbro, a rock with excellent grip for mountaineering. It is named after Alexander Nicolson, who made the first recorded ascent in 1873. Prior to this the mountain had been locally known as Sgurr Biorach.

== Ascent ==
As with other hills of the Cuillin, a head for heights and scrambling ability are needed to attain the summit. The least technical route follows a feature known as the "Great Stone Chute", a scree gully that leads up from the corrie of Coire Lagan to a bealach just below the main ridge. From this col, a pleasant scramble (Grade 2 standard) up the well scratched east ridge leads to the narrow summit.

Other routes require scrambling ability or rock climbing; while there are rock climbs directly up the flanks, the only other way of reaching the summit via a ridge is the south-west ridge, a Grade 3 scramble that begins up a scratched chimney which can be accessed from the summit of Sgùrr Sgumain or from Coir' a' Ghrunnda; there is also a slightly easier route from the top of this chimney directly up a shallow gully on the south face. The summit of Sgùrr Alasdair can be attained by a short detour (from Sgùrr Theàrlaich) off the main ridge by climbers undertaking the full traverse of the Cuillin ridge, or by those following the circuit of Coire Lagan.

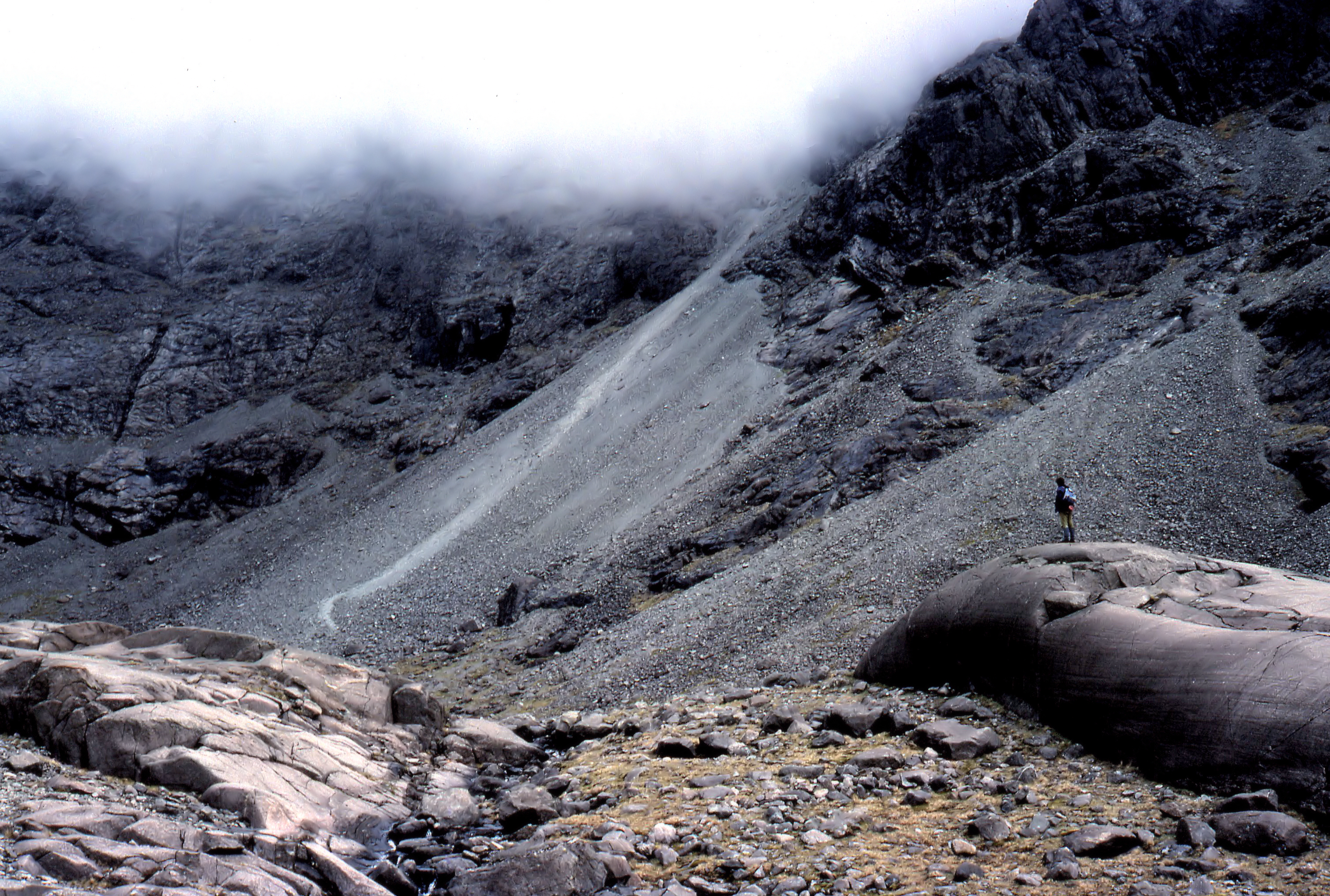
The Great Stone Chute (with pale streak up it) leads up to Sgùrr Alasdair (which is in the cloud)
