= Strathaird =

Peninsula on the Isle of Skye, Scotland, UK

Coordinates: 57.146°N 6.104°W

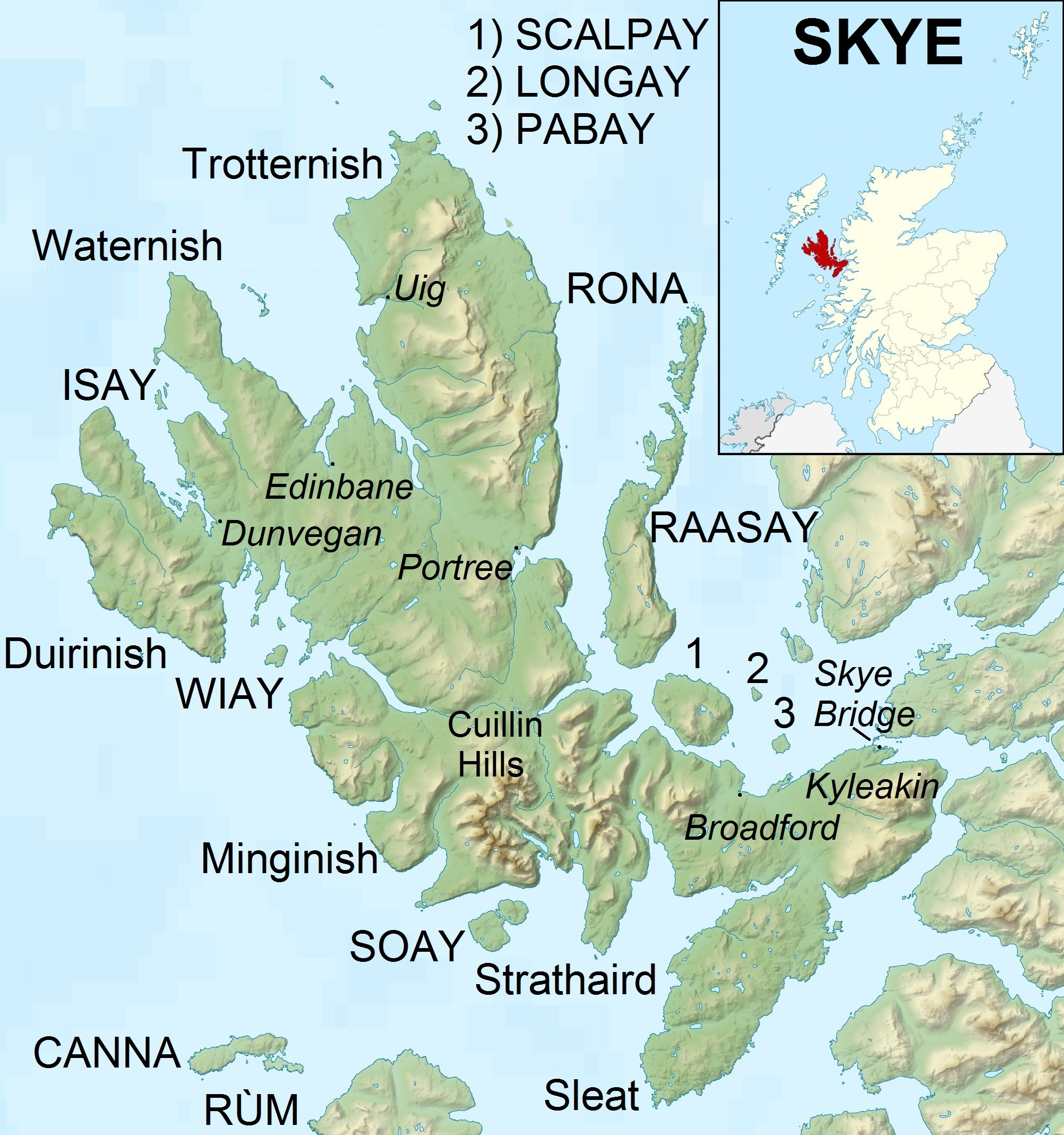
Map of Skye showing Strathaird

Strathaird is a peninsula on the island of Skye, Scotland, situated between Loch Slapin and Loch Scavaig on the south coast.

W. H. Murray said that "Skye is sixty miles long, but what might be its breadth is beyond the ingenuity of man to state". Strathaird is however a straightforward triangular shape with the apex to the south where the lochs meet. Its base to the north is less clear-cut and is contained within the complex of the Cuillin range of mountains. The Munro Blà Bheinn that reaches 928 metres (3,045 ft) is within Strathaird.

It is the smallest and least populous of Skye's main peninsulas, containing only the hamlets of Elgol, Kirkibost, Kilmarie, Drinan and Glasnakille, which are accessed via the B8083 road. The ruins of the Iron Age hill fort Dun Ringill are east of Kirkibost on the shores of Loch Slapin. The Strathaird peninsula was historically a heartland of Clan Mackinnon and tradition holds that Dun Ringill was once the seat of the clan.

The Strathaird Estate was bought by musician Ian Anderson, the frontman for Jethro Tull, in 1978. Anderson started a salmon farming business at Strathaird, which expanded throughout Scotland. The business was reportedly worth over £10 million by the mid 1990s, though much of it has now been sold off. Anderson sold the estate to the John Muir Trust in 1994, for around £750,000. The Trust also own the neighbouring estates of Torrin and Sconser.

== See also ==
- Duirinish
- Minginish
- Sleat
- Trotternish
- Waternish
