= Dun Ringill (song) =

Song by Jethro Tull

from the album Stormwatch
- Released: 14 September 1979
- Genre: Progressive rock; folk
- Length: 2:37
- Label: Chrysalis
- Songwriter(s): Ian Anderson
- Producer(s): Ian Anderson

"Dun Ringill" is a song written by Ian Anderson and performed by his band Jethro Tull. The song was released on the group's 1979 album Stormwatch. Written as a tribute to the fort of the same name, the song features folk rock elements that rebelled against the musical trends of the period.

Released as an album track, "Dun Ringill" has since become a fan favorite for the band. It has since appeared on compilation albums and in the band's live setlist.

== Background ==
"Dun Ringill" was written by Ian Anderson as an ode to the Iron Age-era fort of the same name. The fort, located on the coast of the Isle of Skye in Scotland, was occupied by the Clan Mackinnon for centuries. The ruins of Castle Ringill, located near Loch Slapin, were located on Anderson's Scottish property, thus inspiring him to write the song. Anderson explained:

"Dun Ringill" [is] about the ruins of an old hillside in the Isle of Skye, off the west coast of Scotland, where Nordic invaders would have landed to pillage and plunder and the local folk would have hidden the women and children and the sheep under fortifications.

"Dun Ringill" features a spoken-word introduction by Thames Television meteorologist Francis Wilson, who also appears on the album's opening track, "North Sea Oil". Wilson would later reprise the role on a radio performance of a song, in addition to appearing years later as a guest for Anderson while he guest-hosted as a DJ on Greater London Radio.

== Release and influence ==
"Dun Ringill" was released on the Stormwatch album in September 1979 as the album's eighth track. The song was not released as a single. The track has since appeared on compilation albums such as The Best of Jethro Tull – The Anniversary Collection, 20 Years of Jethro Tull: Highlights, The Best of Acoustic Jethro Tull, and 50 for 50. An early recording of the song was released in October 2019 in anticipation for the forty-year anniversary "Force 10" box-set reissue of Stormwatch.

Swedish progressive metal band Opeth drew influence from the song for their 2016 song "Will O the Wisp", released on their 2016 album Sorceress. Opeth's Mikael Åkerfeldt commented, "['Will'] is a song inspired by 'Dun Ringill' by Jethro Tull. ... I just wanted to go for a simple, catchy vocal melody. It has a slightly positive vibe to it, but the lyrics are really, really dark."

Writer Daniel de Visé of Allmusic spoke glowingly of the song in a retrospective review, commenting, "The crown jewel of [Stormwatch] is 'Dun Ringill,' a sort of Nordic fairy tale set to a beautiful melody and answered by a lovely contrapuntal figure on Ian's acoustic guitar. It's probably my favorite Ian Anderson song."

== Live performances ==
"Dun Ringill" has appeared intermittently in the band's live setlist, being performed on the first date of the Stormwatch tour in Jacksonville, Florida on 2 October 1979. Following the Stormwatch tour, Jethro Tull performed an acoustic rendition of the song on 14 April 1980 for a radio show hosted by Richard Digance—replete with Wilson making a guest appearance to reprise his spoken-word introduction on the track. A live version of the song performed at a 16 March 1980 show in the Netherlands has since appeared on the 40th anniversary reissue of Stormwatch.

"Dun Ringill" also appears on the concert video Slipstream, released in July 1981. The song was one of four on Slipstream for which the band filmed a new music video. The video features Anderson lip syncing to the song while on a rocky portion of the Cliffs of Dover.
