= Slipstream (video) =

Video by Jethro Tull
- Released: 18 July 1981
- Recorded: 1980
- Genre: Progressive rock; art rock
- Length: 57:14
- Label: Polygram Video; Chrysalis
- Director: David Mallet (director)

Jethro Tull chronology
Slipstream (1981)	20 Years of Jethro Tull (1988)

Professional ratings
Review scores
Source	Rating
AllMusic	2.5/5 stars

Slipstream is a video by Jethro Tull, recorded during the 1980 A tour, released in 1981. It was originally released on VHS, Capacitance Electronic Disc, and laserdisc, and was released as a (bootleg) DVD in Brazil (as seen in the cover on the right) in 2003. It is also included in the (2004) bonus DVD edition of A. This bonus DVD was the only official release on DVD until it was released as part of the 40th anniversary box set of A in April 2021.

The video shares its title with a song of the same name on the group's landmark 1971 album Aqualung.

== Music videos ==
Slipstream mixed the concert tour with the videos recorded and directed by David Mallett. London's Hammersmith Odeon was used for exterior scenes, but the main concert footage was actually from a performance at the Los Angeles Sports Arena (as heard on the Magic Piper ROIO), filmed in November 1980. The music videos are:

- "Dun Ringill"

A video inspired by the Stormwatch album cover, filmed at a beach near Beachy Head.

- "Sweet Dream"

In this a vampire-themed homage to horror movies, Aqualung is pursued by a vampire and—like the Prisoner—giant pink balloons. Meanwhile, a ballerina pirouettes (recalling A Passion Play), a giant tarantula emits death rays, and an evil projectionist starts his movie. A nun supplies the right equipment to defeat the vampire.

- "Too Old to Rock 'n' Roll"

The elderly band is in a giant pinball machine, drinking their tea like the Alice in Wonderland tea party. Features Hot Gossip dancer Perri Lister.

- "Fylingdale Flyer"

The band is in an air traffic control tower, when they see some impending disaster. The cover of A is taken from this video. RAF Fylingdales (note the 's') is the site of a Ballistic Missile Early Warning System radar situated in the North York Moors National Park, which explains the lyric to the song.

== Track list ==
All tracks are written by Ian Anderson with additional music material from Eddie Jobson; arranged by Jethro Tull.

No.	Title	Length
1.	"Introduction"	3:27
2.	"Black Sunday"	6:23
3.	"Dun Ringill" (music video)	2:37
4.	"Fylingdale Flyer" (music video)	4:03
5.	"Songs from the Wood"	3:35
6.	"Heavy Horses"	7:25
7.	"Sweet Dream" (music video)	4:04
8.	"Too Old to Rock 'n' Roll" (music video)	5:37
9.	"Skating Away"	3:36
10.	"Aqualung"	8:57
11.	"Locomotive Breath-Black Sunday (reprise)"	6:25
12.	"Credits"	1:05

== Personnel ==
Jethro Tull

- Ian Anderson – flute, vocals
- Martin Barre – electric guitar
- Mark Craney – drums; bass in "Skating Away"
- Dave Pegg – bass; bouzouki in "Skating Away"
- Eddie Jobson – keyboards, electric violin; electric mandolin in "Skating Away"

== See also ==
- A (1980 album)
