= Torrin =

Coordinates: 57.211°N 6.016°W

Torrin: Scottish Gaelic: Na Torrain
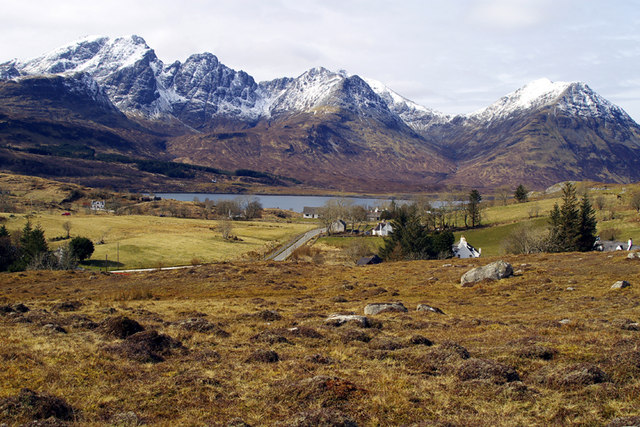

- Location within the Isle of Skye
- OS grid reference: NG5720
- Council area: Highland
- Lieutenancy area: Ross and Cromarty
- Country: Scotland
- Sovereign state: United Kingdom
- Post town: PORTREE
- Postcode district: IV49
- Dialling code: 01471
- Police: Scotland
- Fire: Scottish
- Ambulance: Scottish
- UK Parliament: Inverness, Skye and West Ross-shire
- Scottish Parliament: Ross, Skye and Inverness West

Torrin (Scottish Gaelic: Na Torrain) is a settlement on the island of Skye in Scotland.

== Geography ==
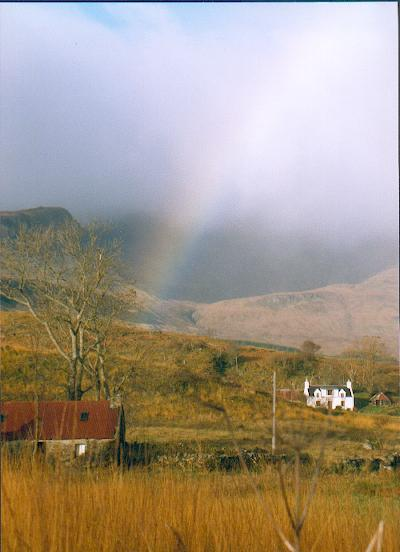

The crofting and fishing village of Torrin lies on the eastern shore of Loch Slapin, 5 miles (8 kilometres) southwest of Broadford (An t-Àth Leathann), on the road to Elgol (Ealaghol). There is a mixture of Victorian white-washed cottages and modern flat-pack houses, and the village has good views of Blaven and Loch Slapin.

Torrin sits on dolomites, informally referred to collectively as the "Durness Limestone". There is an abundance of trees and varied plant flora, including more than a dozen species of orchids. Much of the area is designated a Site of Special Scientific Interest and a Special Area of Conservation.

There are five working crofts in Torrin with cattle and sheep. The common grazing extends north onto the surrounding red granite hills Beinn Dearg Mhòr (709m) and Beinn Dearg Bheag (584m) and beyond the head of Loch Slapin.

=== Marble ===
Skye marble has been extracted from Strath Suardal for centuries. Martin Martin recorded quarries on the south side of the valley in 1703. Torrin has a quarry at each end of the village to extract magnesium-rich marble and limestone to produce lime. Marble from Torrin was used in Armadale Castle and Iona Abbey. The first and smaller quarry opened in 1951 at Cnoc Slapin on the shore of Loch Slapin. The extracted rock was used primarily in the production of agricultural lime. Now abandoned, the area was partially landscaped at the end of 2001, reducing its visual impact.

Glasgow paint manufacturer William Thomson Forsyth started the main quarry at the Broadford end of Torrin in 1960. He leased the land, producing around 3,500 tonnes of product per year by 1965. Today the quarry is owned by Leiths Group and employs 5 people. Marble is mined and crushed on site, producing agricultural lime, ready-mix concrete products and decorative stone.

The earlier Ben Suardal quarry on the Broadford road closed in 1914.

== History ==
The population peaked in the 19th century at around 120 people, dropping to 40 in 1989 and more recently rising to 65, over a third of whom speak Scottish Gaelic.

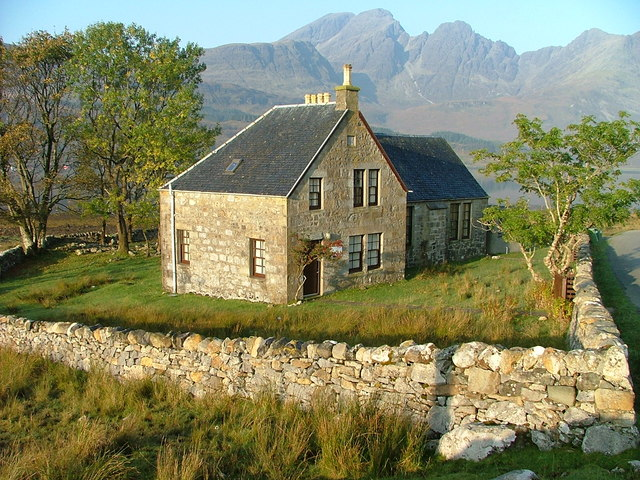
Old school, now a commercially run bunkhouse

The old school closed in 1961. It served as a training base for the Royal Marine Commandos during the 1940s was then used as an outdoor centre and is now a bunkhouse accommodation. The small Torrin church closed in the 1970s, fell into disrepair, and is now a holiday home.

At Cill Chriosd (Christ's Church or "Kilchrist"), halfway to Broadford, are the stark remains of the parish church of Strathaird, including the cleared villages of Boreraig and Susinish. The location is thought to have been a site of Christian worship dating back to the 7th century, when St Maelrubha preached from nearby Cnoc na-Aifhreann ("Hill of the Mass"). The present ruins probably replaced the first medieval stone church in the 16th century. Cill Chrìosd was replaced by a new parish church in Broadford in 1840.

In June 2001 the Torrin Management Committee opened Am Bothan (the Gaelic name for a small hut or shed), a shop providing essential groceries, a selection of local crafts, a children's play area and a cafe.

=== Skye Marble Railway ===
A narrow-gauge line, built in 1907, ran for 3 1/2 miles (5.5 kilometres) from the quarry at Suardale to Broadford pier. It transported Skye marble from the nearby village of Kilbride (Cille Bhrìghde). The railway closed in the early 20th century and the track bed remains as a public footpath. A number of old railway remains can be seen.

== Archaeology ==
In 2006 it was announced that an "entrance to the Underworld" had been discovered at the High Pasture Cave excavations, near Torrin. A natural shaft some 6 metres deep was discovered, which led into a cave, both of which appeared to have been used between 1200 BC and 200 BC (Mid Bronze Age to Late Iron Age). After this date the shaft was deliberately backfilled with structured deposits, suggesting some sort of propitiation ritual comparable to some of the underground structures at Mine Howe on Orkney.

== Cultural references ==
The 1942 film, In Which We Serve starring Noël Coward featured a fictional destroyer, HMS Torrin.
