= Dun Ringill =

Iron Age hill fort in Scotland

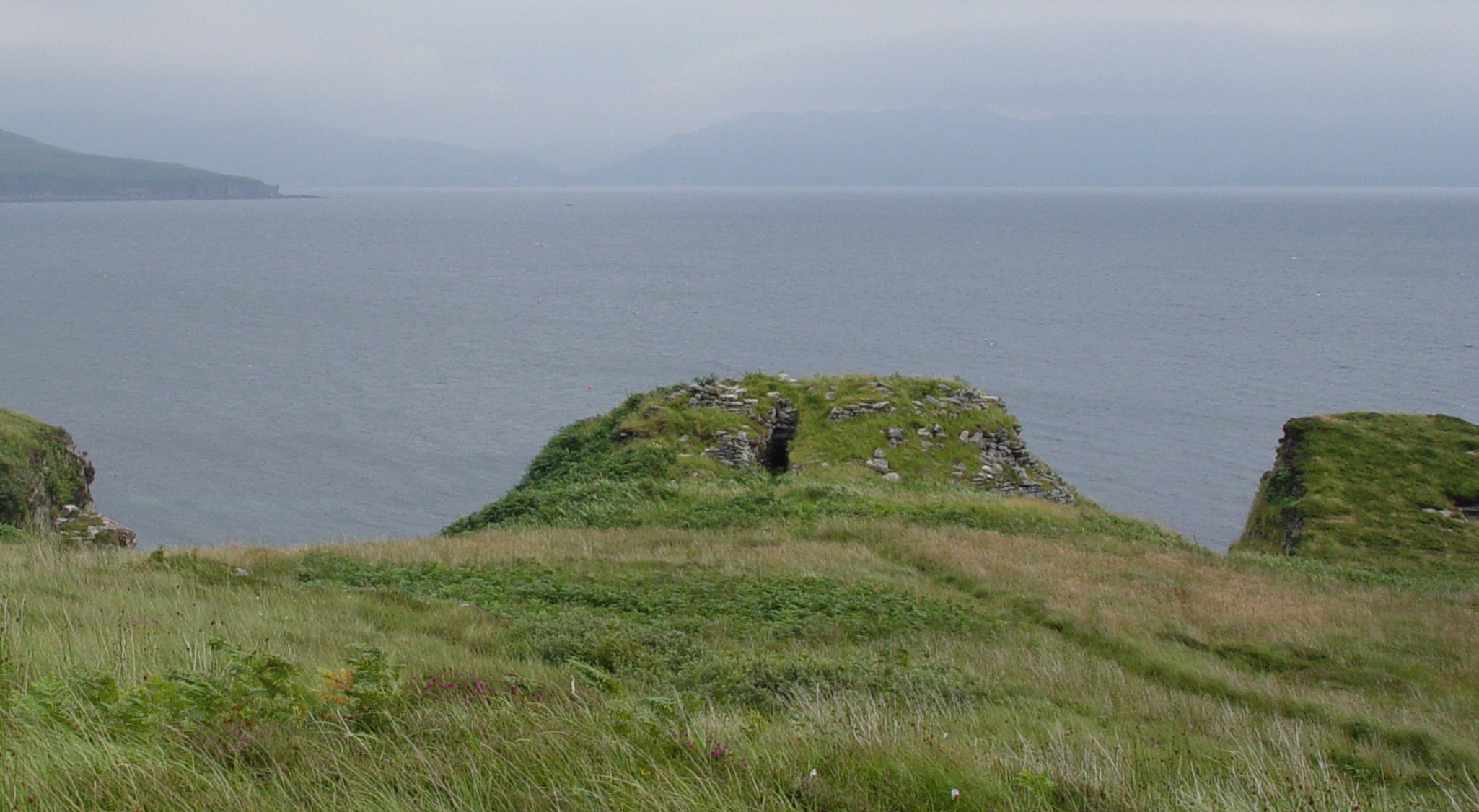
- Dun Ringill fort

- Location within Isle of Skye
- 57°10′45″N 06°02′16″W
- Type: Dun / Broch
- Periods: Iron Age
- Location: Skye

Dun Ringill (Gaelic: Dùn, 'fort', Ringill, 'point of the ravine') is an Iron Age hill fort on the Strathaird peninsula on the island of Skye, Scotland. Further fortified in the Middle Ages, tradition holds that it was for several centuries the seat of Clan MacKinnon. It is located east of Kirkibost on the west shore of Loch Slapin.

== History ==
The original structure of Dun Ringill is consistent with an Iron Age broch dating to approximately the first years of the common era. The main and subordinate structures were occupied and modified throughout its history until the 19th century. Tradition relates that the structure was occupied by the MacKinnons as their clan seat well before the 16th century. It is mentioned in historical texts in the 16th century and likely that the MacKinnons were already established there in 1360. The dun was also known as Castle Findnaus and the MacKinnons established a small farming village township north of the dun.

By the 16th century, the MacKinnons moved their seat to Dunakin.

== Description ==
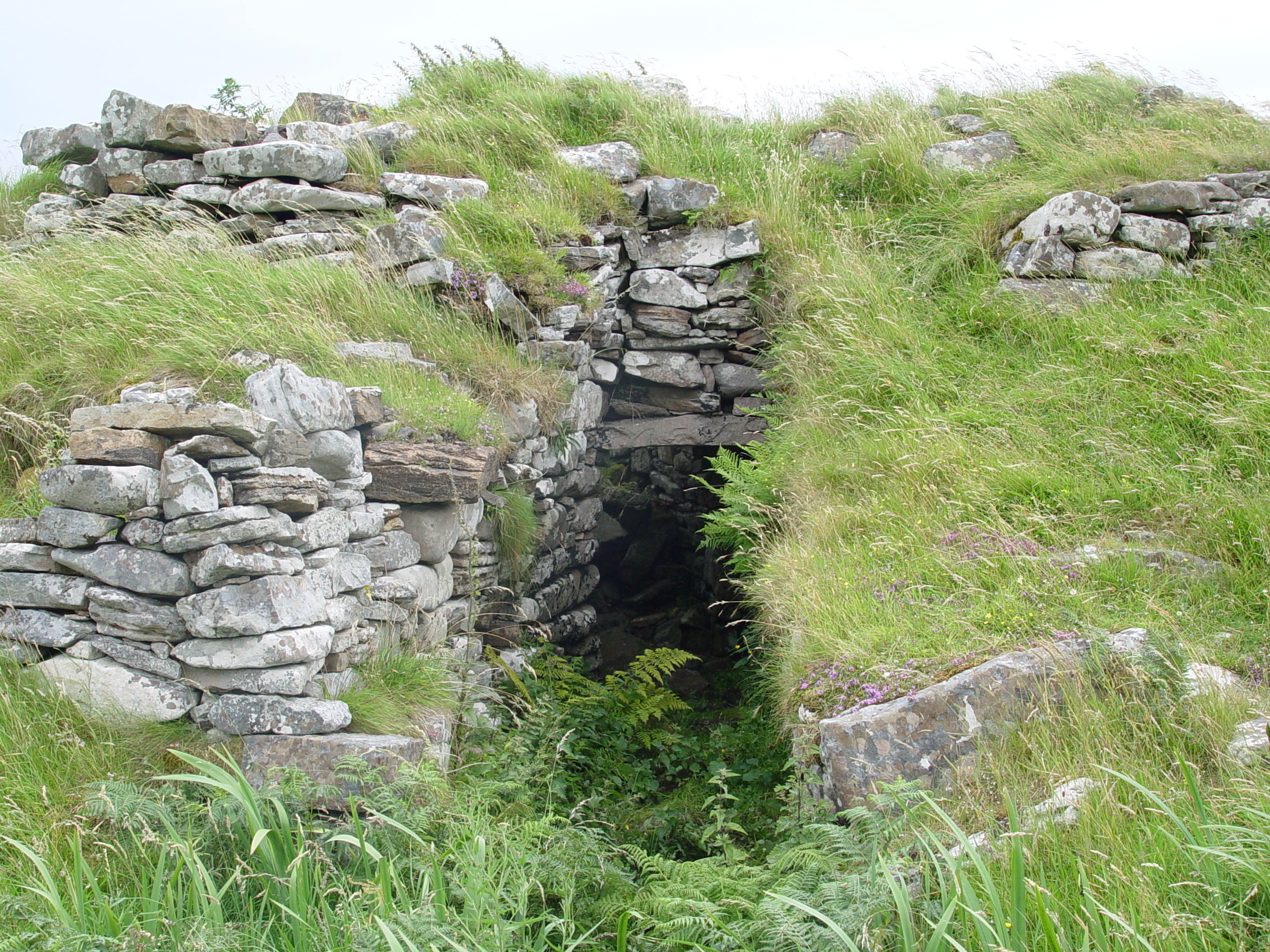
Dun Ringill doorway

Dun Ringill today is a stacked stone ruin overlooking Loch Slapin. The present structure is approximately 4 metres (13 feet) in height and 16 m (52 ft) on each side, with a ditch following the outer wall. Its most notable feature is the central landward facing doorway approximately 1.8 m (5 ft 11 in) high that leads into the center of the structure. The interior of the structure contained two rectangular buildings measuring 4.5 by 2.4 m (14 ft 9 in by 7 ft 10 in). The original layout was similar to that of a broch, a form of complex Atlantic roundhouse.

A stone wall foundation encloses area adjacent to the structure. Similarly to other castles and fortified houses, the wall probably formed a defensive perimeter and livestock enclosure. The remains of the wall itself are hidden by vegetation. A site survey has shown that there are remains of other buildings in the immediate vicinity; and although their age is uncertain, it is likely their construction and occupation was throughout the history of Dun Ringill up until the 19th century.

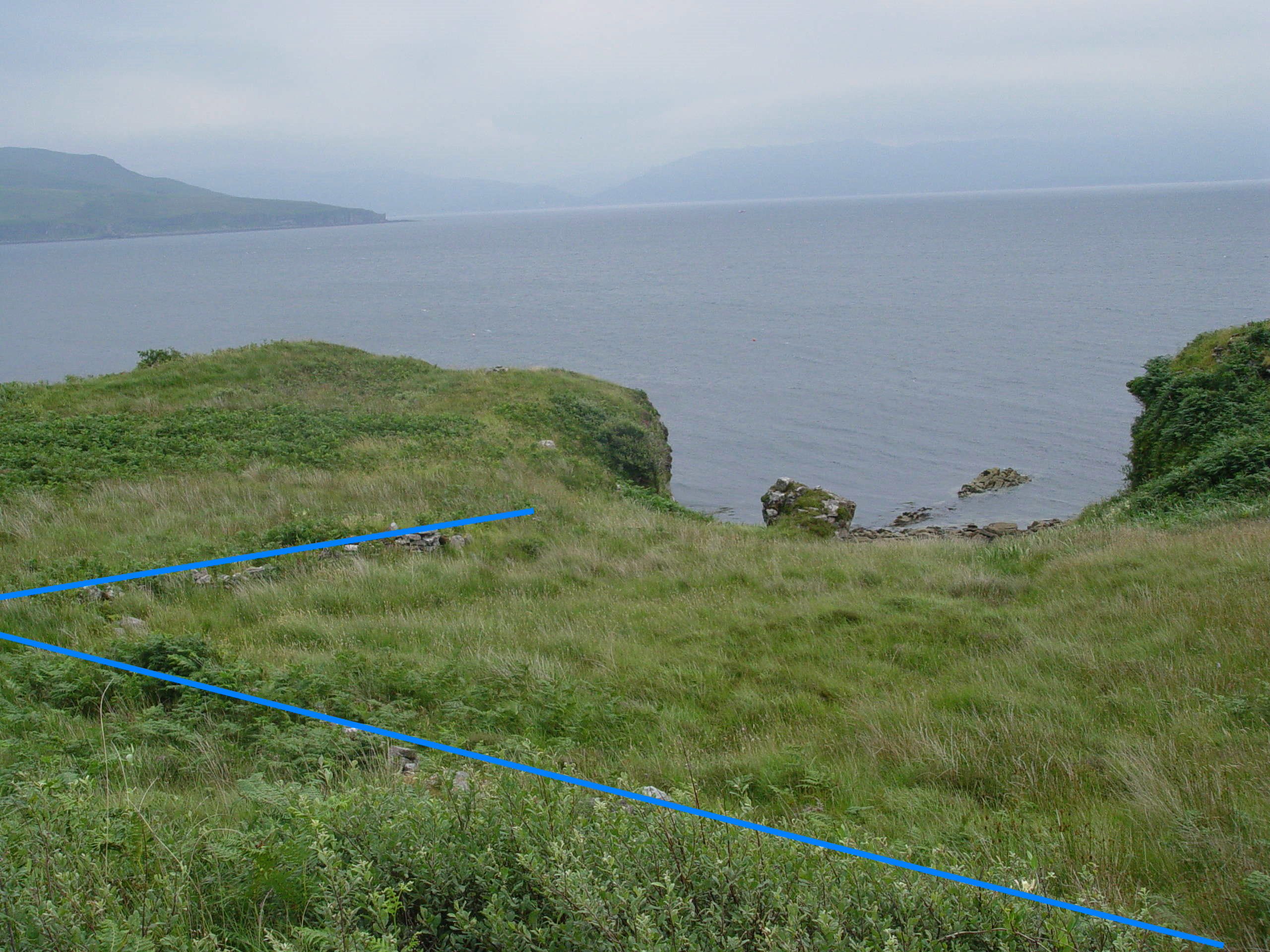
Dun Ringill perimeter wall indicated by the blue lines

To the north and west is a hilly coastal plain. Loch Slapin lies to the east and south of the structure. On either side of the structure are earth and stone ramps that descend down to the ocean. These ramps likely allowed easy access to the water and shipping. Since roads in this part of Skye did not exist until recent times, sea travel was the predominant mode of transportation.

== In popular culture ==
The rock band Jethro Tull performed a song entitled "Dun Ringill" on their 1979 Stormwatch album. The lyrics call for a meeting down by Dun Ringill during the wee hours of a stormy night, when "we'll watch the old gods play." The song was written by Tull leader Ian Anderson, who lived at Kilmarie House, within walking distance of Dun Ringill, at the time.
