= Norma Borthwick =

British artist, writer, and Irish-language activist

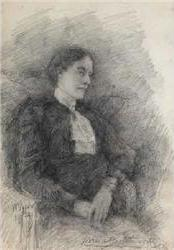
- Norma Borthwick by John Butler Yeats
- Born: Mariella Norma Borthwick; 25 July 1862; Highfield, Higher Bebington, Chester, England
- Died: 13 June 1934 (aged 71); Kilbride, Skye, Scotland
- Other names: Aodh Rua, Fear na Móna
- Occupations: Artist, writer, teacher
- Known for: Irish-language activist

Mariella Norma Borthwick (25 July 1862 – 13 June 1934) was a British artist and writer and an Irish language activist.

== Early life ==
Mariella Norma Borthwick was born in Highfield, Higher Bebington, Chester, on 25 July 1862. She was one of five daughters and three sons of the merchant George Borthwick, and Mary Elizabeth Borthwick (née MacDonald). Though she was born in England, Borthwick considered herself a Scot of Gaelic descent. From an early age she displayed an interest in the culture of Ireland, and learned the Irish language at the Southwark Literary Society in London.

== Work with the Irish language ==
A talented artist, Borthwick found fame in Ireland first through her sketches of tenant evictions on the Olphert estate in Gweedore, County Donegal which were published by United Ireland in late 1890. She became involved in the language movement in London and Dublin, visiting the west of Ireland and the Aran Islands regularly.

In January 1895, Borthwick joined the Gaelic League in London, and while living on Markham Square, Chelsea acted as its treasurer. She won a prize for her essay, Brí na teanga i gcúis na náisiúntachta (The significance of language to the nationalist cause), at the inaugural Oireachtas na Gaeilge in 1897, under the pseudonym "Aodh Rua" (Red Hugh). The following year she won a prize in singing. When the Irish Texts Society was created on 26 April 1898 in London Borthwick and Eleanor Hull were the first secretaries.

From May to December 1898 Borthwick served on the central council of the Gaelic League as secretary, and became a member of the executive council in 1899. The same year she was secretary to the year's Oireachtas na Gaeilge, with her "education and taste" noted as beneficial to the organisation.

Borthwick was the chairman of the new Gaelic League branch in Drumcondra, Dublin in 1900. After her resignation from the League, there was a dearth of prominent and strong female voices within the organisation.

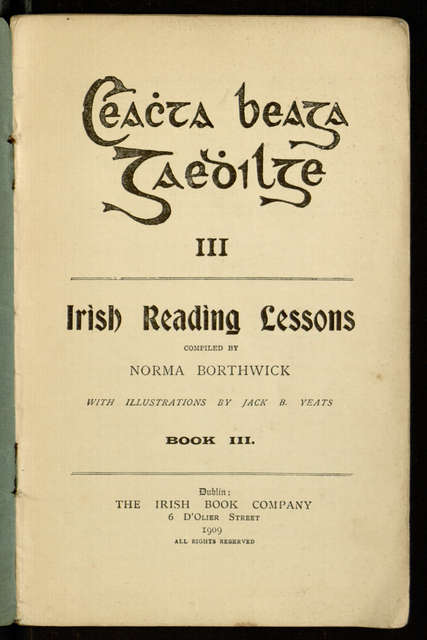
Norma Borthwick's book illustrated by Jack Butler Yeats

Borthwick assisted Eoin MacNeill in the publication of An Claidheamh Soluis, going on to write a series in Irish for St Patrick's magazine from 1900 to 1903, under the name "Fear na Móna". In 1900, she wrote and illustrated Aigibitir na Gaeilge, and in 1902 produced a three-volume textbook Ceachta beaga Gaeilge, illustrated by Jack Butler Yeats. (There is a drawing of Borthwick by his father John Butler Yeats.)

Borthwick founded the Irish Book Company with Mairéad Ní Raghallaigh, which initially operated from O'Connell Street, and later Eccles Street in Dublin. From there, she published a number of books and pamphlets, such as seven booklets of songs under the title Ceol Sidhe. The company also published Father Peadar Ua Laoghaire's Mo Sgéal Féin, with Borthwick preparing a dictionary for the book. She was later named as one of literary executors. In a collaboration with Osborn Bergin, she published Leourín na leanav in 1913.

Borthwick was an acquaintance of Lady Gregory, staying at her house at Coole Park and teaching Gregory and local English-speakers Irish. During one stay, she held an Irish-language Punch and Judy show with Douglas Hyde.

She taught Irish in the Dominican convent on Eccles Street, and was a private Irish tutor to numerous wealthy families.

== Later life ==
Borthwick left Ireland in 1919 to live with her sister Grace Hay Borthwick, due to her own declining health. They first lived in Newcastle upon Tyne, then Scalfay in the Shetland Islands, and finally at Kilbride House, Kilbride, Skye in the late 1920s. By this point Borthwick was paralysed and unable to speak, having contracted encephalitis lethargica or sleeping sickness in the wake of World War I. When she died at Kilbride on 13 June 1934, she had suffered from sleeping sickness for 16 years, Parkinsonism for six years, and bulbar paralysis for two years. She is buried on the island.
