= Loch Slapin =

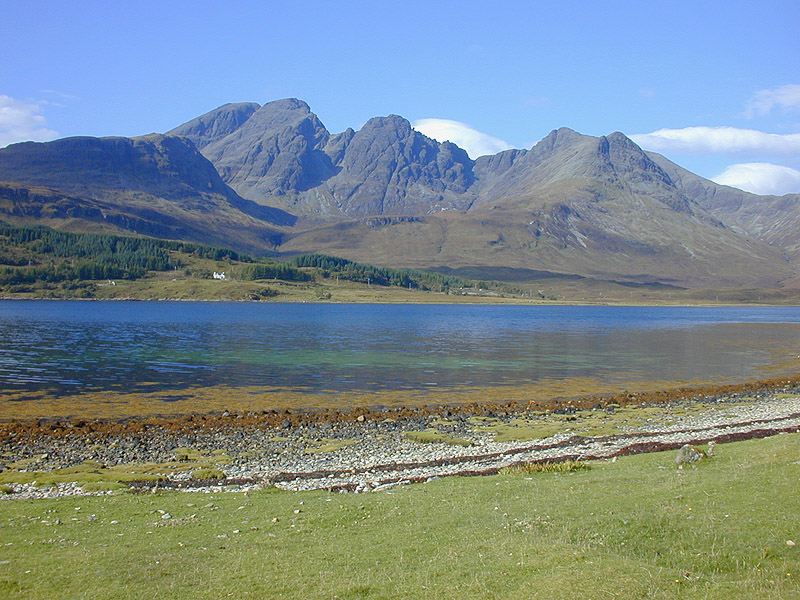
- Loch Slapin with Bla Bheinn in the background

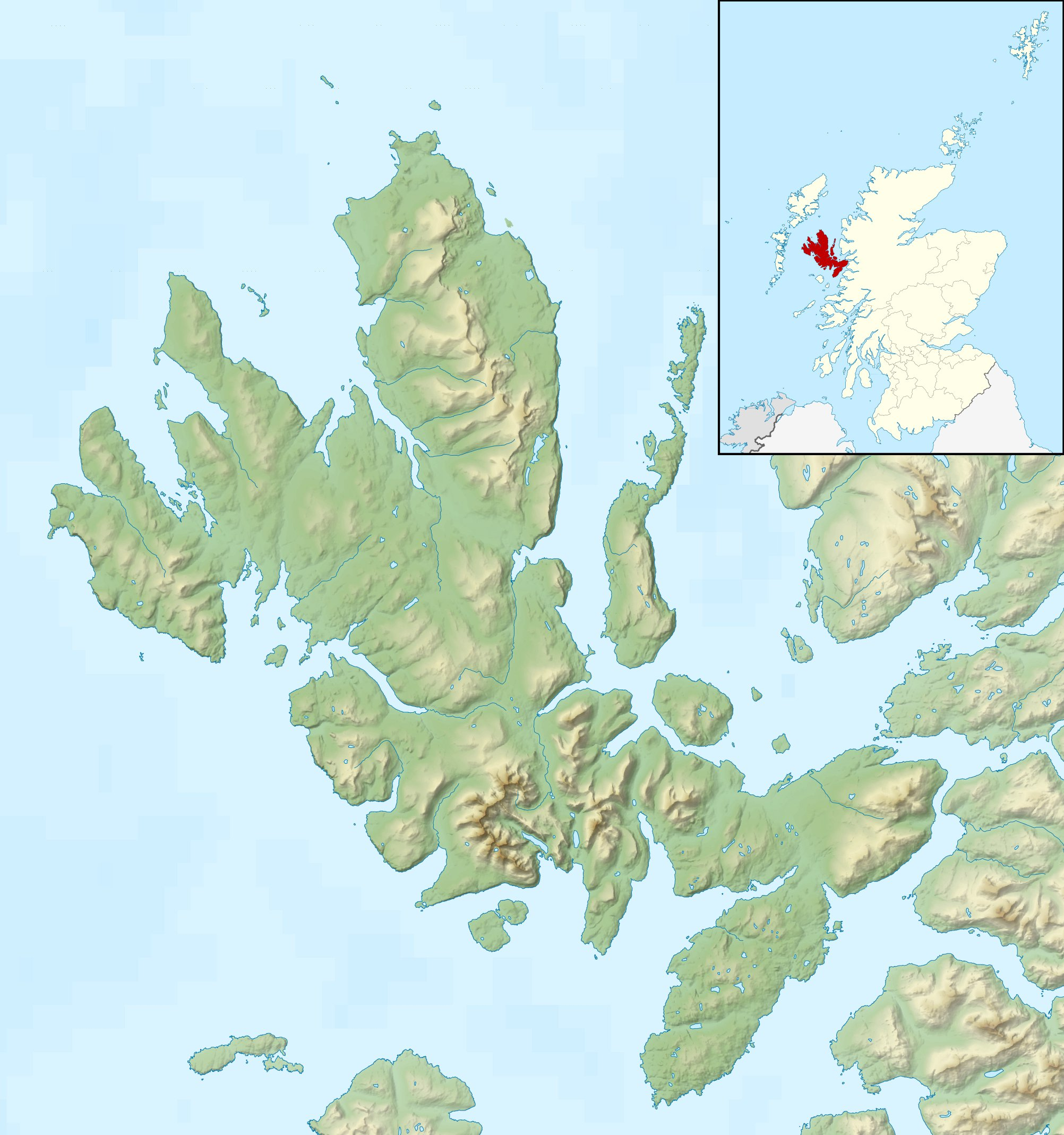
- Location within Isle of Skye
- Location: Isle of Skye, Highland, Scotland
- Coordinates: 57°10′27.2″N 6°1′8.8″W
- Type: Sea loch
- Primary inflows: Allt na Dunaiche, Allt na Bà Glaise
- Primary outflows: Sound of Sleat
- Basin countries: United Kingdom
- Max. length: 6 km (3.7 mi)
- Max. width: 0.5 to 1 km (0.31 to 0.62 mi)
- Settlements: Torrin

Loch Slapin is a sea loch located on the southeastern coast of the Isle of Skye in the Scottish Highlands. It is noted for its dramatic natural scenery and proximity to the Cuillin mountains, making it a popular location for hiking, photography, and nature tourism.

== Geography ==
Loch Slapin extends inland from the Sound of Sleat for approximately 6 km (3.7 mi), with a variable width between 0.5 to 1 km (0.31 to 0.62 mi). It is flanked by the Red Cuillin and Black Cuillin mountain ranges and provides expansive views of Bla Bheinn (also known as Blaven), a 928 m (3,045 ft) peak that dominates the eastern skyline.

The village of Torrin lies on the western shore of the loch. Historically, Torrin was a center for marble quarrying, and stone from the area was used in the construction of buildings such as Armadale Castle and Iona Abbey.

== History ==
Near the western shore of the loch is Dun Ringill, an Iron Age fort later used by Clan MacKinnon as their seat. The site consists of ancient stone remains on a rocky promontory and provides views over the loch and toward the surrounding hills.

== Outdoor activities ==
The area around Loch Slapin is popular with outdoor enthusiasts. The hike to the summit of Bla Bheinn is considered one of the most rewarding routes on the Isle of Skye, offering panoramic views of the Cuillin and the surrounding lochs and sea. The loch also attracts wild campers, photographers, and kayakers.

== See also ==
- Dun Ringill
- Bla Bheinn
- Torrin
- Isle of Skye
