= Francis Wilson (meteorologist) =

British meteorologist and television weather presenter

Francis Alfred Wilson (born 27 February 1949) is a British weather forecaster, from Buckinghamshire, who was a presenter and the Head of Weather on the BBC's Breakfast Time and Breakfast News from 1983 until 1992, and Sky News from 1993 until 2010.

== Early life ==
Wilson was born in Irvine, North Ayrshire, Scotland. He went to Newtown Infants School, Whitehill Junior School, Germains County Secondary School and Dr Challoner's Grammar School. He grew up in Chesham, firstly in Pond Park.

When he took flying lessons, and had to land a light aircraft, and could feel turbulence, he took an interest in weather. After leaving school, he gained his private pilots licence, but did not want to be a commercial pilot. He took a year off to go travelling around Europe.

He graduated with a Bachelor of Science degree in Physics from Imperial College London, taking a meteorology module in his last year.

== Career ==
Wilson worked as a Meteorological Office forecaster from 1972, with five years at Prestwick Airport. He then worked at the RAE in Farnborough, Hampshire with the airborne RAF Meteorological Research Flight (MRF), using a high-altitude Canberra aircraft for three years, This aircraft would have taken part in the 1974 Global Atmospheric Research Program. In later years the research aircraft was a Hercules. From 2001 MRF was superseded by the NERC (FAAM) at Cranfield in Bedfordshire. He became a Fellow of the Royal Meteorological Society in 1973, and later a Chartered Meteorologist.

In 1978, he joined Thames TV as a weatherman, where he wore jeans, and an open-necked shirt, which gained him much fan mail, possibly for the audacity or novelty. He joined the BBC's Breakfast Time team in 1983, using computer-generated graphics for the first time on British television. While at the BBC, his job required him to wake up at 3 a.m., five times a week, which he did not like. He presented from Lime Grove. On the way to work, he would collect satellite information from Imperial College. On 15 July 1985, an episode of Favourite Walks, in Chesham, was shown.

Wilson joined Sky News in 1993 and, until June 2010, headed the weather department, which broadcast weather forecasts for Europe 24 hours a day.

In 1979, Wilson was invited by Ian Anderson to contribute to the Jethro Tull album Stormwatch. Wilson reads the Shipping Forecast on the track "North Sea Oil", and the spoken introduction to "Dun Ringill".

In 1998, Wilson was invited to Morocco by Sir Richard Branson to advise on meteorological conditions for his Virgin Earth Challenge balloon attempt.

== Awards ==
Wilson has won the title of "Best Television Weather Presenter – Worldwide" at the International Television Weather Forecasters Festival in 1995, 1997, 2000 and 2003. He is also the author of seven books, including The Great British Obsession (1990).

== Publications ==
In the 1980s he wrote children's books about weather, published by Macdonalds.

== Personal life ==
He has two sons.
