= A (Jethro Tull album) =

Studio album by Jethro Tull
- Released: 29 August 1980
- Recorded: 16 May – 6 June 1980
- Studios: Maison Rouge Studios, Fulham, London; Maison Rouge Mobile, Radnage
- Genres: Electronic rock; progressive rock; folk rock
- Length: 42:30
- Label: Chrysalis
- Producers: Ian Anderson; Robin Black

Jethro Tull chronology
Stormwatch (1979)	A (1980)	The Broadsword and the Beast (1982)

Singles from A
- 1. "Fylingdale Flyer" / "Working John, Working Joe" Released: 10 October 1980

Professional ratings
Review scores
Source	Rating
AllMusic	3/5 stars
The Encyclopedia of Popular Music	2/5 stars

A is the thirteenth studio album by British rock band Jethro Tull. It was released on 29 August 1980 in the UK and 1 September of the same year in the United States.

The album was initially written and recorded with the intention of being frontman Ian Anderson's debut solo album. Hence the album's title: the master tapes were marked "A" for Anderson during recording. However, the album was eventually released as a Jethro Tull album after pressure from Chrysalis Records. Anderson has since stated that he regrets allowing the album to be released under the Jethro Tull name.

Musically, the album was a departure from prior Tull works, adopting more of an electronic rock sound with heavy use of synthesizers, although still retaining the band's trademark folk influence and Anderson's flute playing. Lyrically, the album saw a similar departure from the fantasy and folklore themes of previous Tull work, instead emphasizing contemporary matters such as the Cold War. A was the first Tull album released following a large lineup change which saw drummer Barrie "Barriemore" Barlow and keyboardists John Evan and David Palmer departing the band in 1980 while bassist John Glascock had died from heart complications the previous year. The album instead features Glascock's touring replacement Dave Pegg on bass in his first recorded appearance with the band, Mark Craney on drums and Eddie Jobson on keyboards and electric violin (with Jobson credited as a "special guest").

== Overview ==
A was recorded as an intended Ian Anderson solo album before Tull's record label, Chrysalis, asked that it become credited to the group. This is the reason for the album's title, as the tapes were marked "A" for "Anderson". It is noted for its more synthesiser-based sound, a fact which created controversy among many of the band's fans. On the other hand, it features a folk-influenced piece, "The Pine Marten's Jig".

A features a dramatically different line-up of Tull from the band's previous album, Stormwatch (1979). Former keyboardist John Evan and organist Dee Palmer were fired from the group, while drummer Barriemore Barlow left the band due to depression over the death of John Glascock as well as plans to start his own band.

The only members of Tull to appear on both Stormwatch (1979) and A (1980) are Ian Anderson and Martin Barre. This is also bassist Dave Pegg's first appearance on a Tull studio recording, but he had become a member of the band during the Stormwatch tour in 1979, replacing the deceased Glascock. Conflicting reasons have been given for the line-up change. Anderson has stated that he wanted to take the band in a different direction from the folk rock and progressive rock of the 1970s.

Barriemore Barlow was unhappy with the direction the band was taking and later stated that he would have left anyway. However, biographer David Rees reports that Anderson had never intended to replace Jethro Tull's previous line-up with the musicians who recorded A, but was forced by Chrysalis Records, which had decided to release his 'solo' album under the name Jethro Tull. This claim was further evidenced by Anderson's note in the 2003 re-release of the album.

A 40th anniversary box set was released in April 2021, featuring the album remixed by Steven Wilson. It includes some bonus tracks, a DVD of Slipstream, and audio of a concert in Los Angeles.

== Track listing ==
All tracks are written by Ian Anderson with additional music material from Eddie Jobson; arranged by Jethro Tull.

Side one
No.	Title	Length
1.	"Crossfire"	3:55
2.	"Fylingdale Flyer"	4:35
3.	"Working John, Working Joe"	5:04
4.	"Black Sunday"	6:35

Side two
No.	Title	Length
1.	"Protect and Survive"	3:36
2.	"Batteries Not Included"	3:52
3.	"Uniform"	3:34
4.	"4.W.D. (Low Ratio)"	3:42
5.	"The Pine Marten's Jig" (instrumental)	3:28
6.	"And Further On"	4:21

The 2004 remastered two-disc edition includes Slipstream as a bonus DVD.

=== 2021 40th Anniversary A La Mode Edition ===
CD 1: Original Album And Associated Tracks Steven Wilson Stereo Mix
No.	Title	Length
1.	"Crossfire"	4:05
2.	"Fylingdale Flyer"	4:35
3.	"Working John, Working Joe"	5:07
4.	"Black Sunday"	6:42
5.	"Protect And Survive"	3:37
6.	"Batteries Not Included"	3:52
7.	"Uniform"	3:33
8.	"4.W.D. (Low Ratio)"	3:44
9.	"The Pine Marten's Jig"	3:25
10.	"And Further On"	4:25
11.	"Crossfire (Extended Version)"	4:39
12.	"Working John, Working Joe (Take 4)"	5:16
13.	"Cheerio (Early Version)"	0:39
14.	"Coruisk"	6:29
15.	"Slipstream Introduction"	2:51

CD 2: Live At The LA Sports Arena, 1980 Part 1 Steven Wilson Stereo Mix
No.	Title	Length
1.	"Slipstream Introduction"	3:01
2.	"Black Sunday"	7:07
3.	"Crossfire"	3:59
4.	"Songs From The Wood"	4:51
5.	"Hunting Girl"	6:04
6.	"The Pine Marten's Jig"	3:43
7.	"Working John, Working Joe"	4:17
8.	"Heavy Horses"	7:29
9.	"Musicians Introductions"	1:55
10.	"Skating Away On The Thin Ice Of The New Day"	3:28
11.	"Instrumental (Inc Flute Solo)"	6:16

CD 3: Live At The LA Sports Arena, 1980 Part 2 Steven Wilson Stereo Mix
No.	Title	Length
1.	"Trio Instrumental"	5:08
2.	"Keyboard Solo"	7:58
3.	"Batteries Not Included"	4:14
4.	"Uniform (Inc Drum Solo)"	6:48
5.	"Protect And Survive (Inc Violin Solo)"	6:24
6.	"Bungle In The Jungle"	5:31
7.	"Encore Intro - Guitar And Bass Instrumental"	3:01
8.	"Aqualung"	9:48
9.	"Locomotive Breath / Instrumental / Black Sunday (Reprise)"	7:02

DVD 1: Steven Wilson Album Remix
No.	Title	Length
1.	"Crossfire (96/24 Stereo LPCM, DTS 96/24 5.1, Dolby AC3 5.1)"
2.	"Fylingdale Flyer (96/24 Stereo LPCM, DTS 96/24 5.1, Dolby AC3 5.1)"
3.	"Working John, Working Joe (96/24 Stereo LPCM, DTS 96/24 5.1, Dolby AC3 5.1)"
4.	"Black Sunday (96/24 Stereo LPCM, DTS 96/24 5.1, Dolby AC3 5.1)"
5.	"Protect And Survive (96/24 Stereo LPCM, DTS 96/24 5.1, Dolby AC3 5.1)"
6.	"Batteries Not Included (96/24 Stereo LPCM, DTS 96/24 5.1, Dolby AC3 5.1)"
7.	"Uniform (96/24 Stereo LPCM, DTS 96/24 5.1, Dolby AC3 5.1)"
8.	"4.W.D. (Low Ratio) (96/24 Stereo LPCM, DTS 96/24 5.1, Dolby AC3 5.1)"
9.	"The Pine Marten's Jig (96/24 Stereo LPCM, DTS 96/24 5.1, Dolby AC3 5.1)"
10.	"And Further On (96/24 Stereo LPCM, DTS 96/24 5.1, Dolby AC3 5.1)"
11.	"Crossfire (Original 1980 Album Mix (96/24 Stereo LPCM))"
12.	"Fylingdale Flyer (Original 1980 Album Mix (96/24 Stereo LPCM))"
13.	"Working John, Working Joe (Original 1980 Album Mix (96/24 Stereo LPCM))"
14.	"Black Sunday (Original 1980 Album Mix (96/24 Stereo LPCM))"
15.	"Protect And Survive (Original 1980 Album Mix (96/24 Stereo LPCM))"
16.	"Batteries Not Included (Original 1980 Album Mix (96/24 Stereo LPCM))"
17.	"Uniform (Original 1980 Album Mix (96/24 Stereo LPCM))"
18.	"4.W.D. (Low Ratio) (Original 1980 Album Mix (96/24 Stereo LPCM))"
19.	"The Pine Marten's Jig (Original 1980 Album Mix (96/24 Stereo LPCM))"
20.	"And Further On (Original 1980 Album Mix (96/24 Stereo LPCM))"
21.	"Cheerio (Early Version) (96/24 Stereo LPCM, DTS 96/24 5.1, Dolby AC3 5.1)"
22.	"Coruisk (96/24 Stereo LPCM, DTS 96/24 5.1, Dolby AC3 5.1)"
23.	"Slipstream Introduction (96/24 Stereo LPCM, DTS 96/24 5.1, Dolby AC3 5.1)"
24.	"Crossfire (Extended Version) (-Stereo Only-)"
25.	"Working John, Working Joe (Take 4) (-Stereo Only-)"

DVD 2: Live At The LA Sports Arena, 1980 Steven Wilson Concert Mix (DTS 96/24 5.1 Surround, Dolby AC3 5.1 Surround, Stereo 96/24 LPCM)
No.	Title	Length
1.	"Slipstream Introduction"
2.	"Black Sunday"
3.	"Crossfire"
4.	"Songs From The Wood"
5.	"Hunting Girl"
6.	"The Pine Marten's Jig"
7.	"Working John, Working Joe"
8.	"Heavy Horses"
9.	"Musicians Introductions"
10.	"Skating Away On The Thin Ice Of The New Day"
11.	"Instrumental (Inc Flute Solo)"
12.	"Trio Instrumental"
13.	"Keyboard Solo"
14.	"Batteries Not Included"
15.	"Uniform (Inc Drum Solo)"
16.	"Protect And Survive (Inc Violin Solo)"
17.	"Bungle In The Jungle"
18.	"Encore Intro - Guitar And Bass Instrumental"
19.	"Aqualung"
20.	"Locomotive Breath / Instrumental / Black Sunday (Reprise)"

Slipstream Video Steven Wilson Album Remix (DTS 96/24 5.1 Surround, Dolby AC3 5.1 Surround, Stereo 48/24 LPCM)
No.	Title	Length
1.	"Slipstream Introduction"
2.	"Black Sunday"
3.	"Dun Ringil"
4.	"Flyingdale Flyer"
5.	"Songs From The Wood"
6.	"Heavy Horses"
7.	"Sweet Dream"
8.	"Too Old To Rock'n'Roll: Too Young To Die"
9.	"Skating Away On The Thin Ice Of The New Day"
10.	"Aqualung"
11.	"Locomotive Breath"

== Personnel ==
- Ian Anderson – vocals, flute
- Martin Barre – guitar
- Dave Pegg – bass guitar, mandolin
- Mark Craney – drums

Guest personnel

- Eddie Jobson – keyboards, synthesizer, electric violin on "The Pine Marten's Jig"

Technical staff

- Robin Black – sound engineer
- John Shaw – photography
- Peter Wagg – art direction

== Charts ==
1980 chart performance for A
Chart (1980)	Peak position
Australian Albums (Kent Music Report)	47
Austrian Albums (Ö3 Austria)	10
Canada Top Albums/CDs (RPM)	48
Dutch Albums (Album Top 100)	60
German Albums (Offizielle Top 100)	26
Norwegian Albums (VG-lista)	9
UK Albums (Official Charts)	25
US Billboard 200	30

2021 chart performance for A
Chart (2021)	Peak position
Belgian Albums (Ultratop Flanders)	91
Belgian Albums (Ultratop Wallonia)	65
German Albums (Offizielle Top 100)	11
Hungarian Albums (MAHASZ)	14
Scottish Albums (Official Charts)	5
Swiss Albums (Schweizer Hitparade)	18
UK Rock & Metal Albums (Official Charts)	3
