= Findanus =

Findanus is claimed by Clan MacKinnon as their fourth chief and the progenitor of the clan name. He is claimed to have been a great grandson of Alpin, and to have lived in the late ninth and early tenth centuries on the Isle of Skye, Scotland. Findanus brought Dunakin Castle into the clan.

According to the Clan MacKinnon history:

Findanus Second son of Doungallus, was seized of the estate of the Tombermory in the Isle of Mull and Findanus Castle (Dunakin) in the Isle of Skye, known by the name of MacKinnon Castle in the present day; this castle was the residence of the Lairds of MacKinnon till the 14th century, when Strathardill, also in Skye, became their seat. Findanus and his bride, the Norse princess nicknamed ‘Saucy Mary,’ ran a heavy chain from Skye to Lochalsh and levied a toll on all shipping passing up and down. It is from him that the MacKinnon chiefs obtained their Gaelic Patronymic.
