= Irish Texts Society =

Society to promote the study of Irish literature

Irish Texts Society Cumann na Scríbheann nGaedhilge
- Abbreviation: ITC
- Formation: 26 April 1898
- Founder: Douglas Hyde
- Type: Irish language Irish culture Gaelic revival
- Headquarters: Dublin, Ireland
- Website: irishtextssociety.org

The Irish Texts Society (Irish: Cumann na Scríbheann nGaedhilge) was founded in 1898 to promote the study of Irish literature. It is a text publication society, issuing annotated editions of texts in Irish with English translations and related commentaries.

The organisation was created in London, on 26 April 1898. Douglas Hyde was its first president, Frederick York Powell was its first chairman and Norma Borthwick and Eleanor Hull were the secretaries.

As of 2009, the ITS had published sixty-three items in its main series and twenty items in its subsidiary series. Other publications have included Patrick S. Dinneen's Irish-English Dictionary and the Historical Dictionary of Irish Placenames.

The society holds an annual seminar at University College Cork, with the 21st event taking place in November 2019.
