= Eleanor Hull =

English writer, journalist and scholar of Old Irish (1860–1935)

Eleanor Henrietta Hull
- Eibhlín Ní Choill
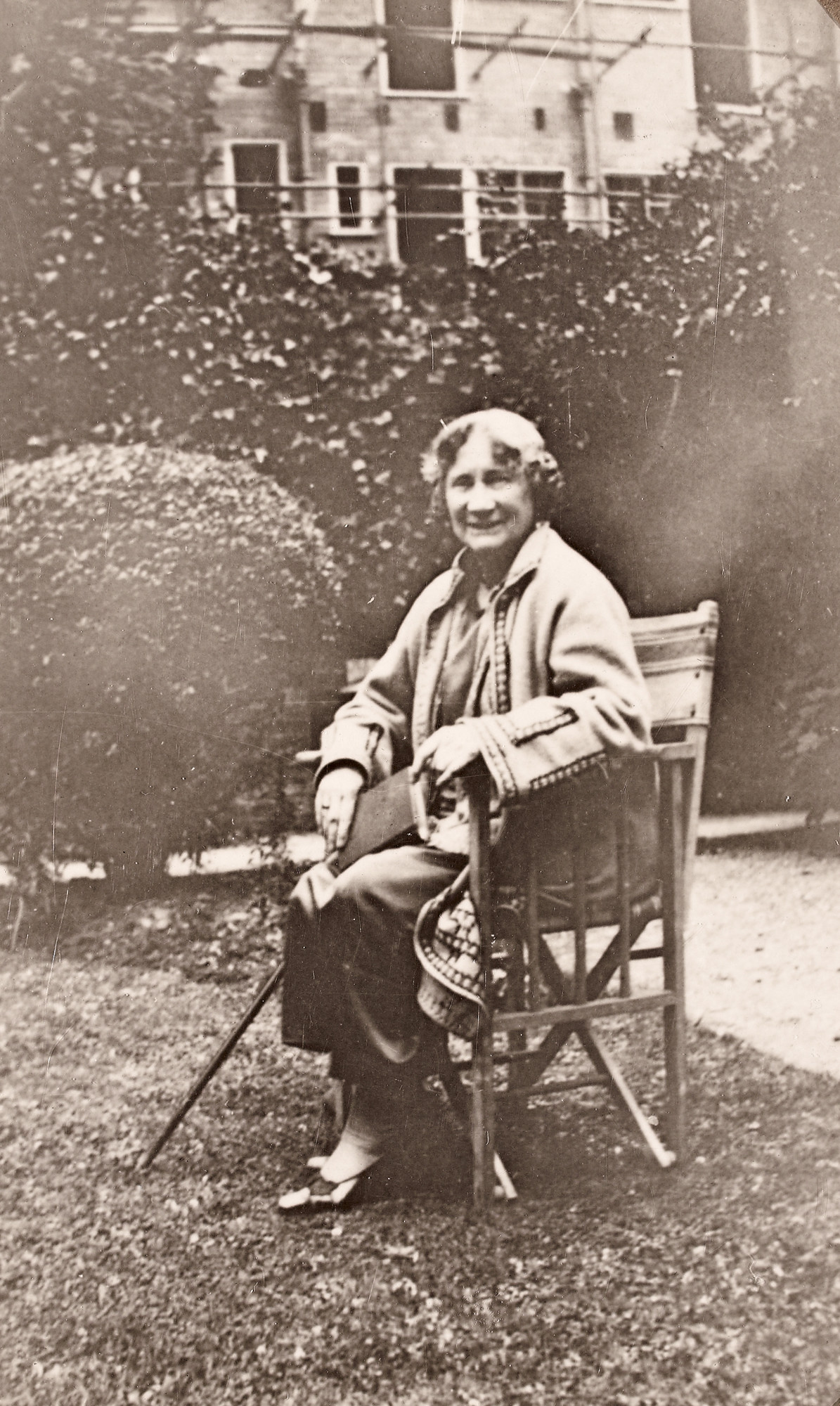
- Hull in 1930
- Born: 15 January 1860; Cheetham, Manchester, England
- Died: 13 January 1935 (aged 74); Wimbledon, Surrey, England
- Occupation: Writer

Eleanor Henrietta Hull also known as Eibhlín Ní Choill (15 January 1860 – 13 January 1935) was an English writer, journalist and scholar of Old Irish.

== Life and family ==
Hull was born on 15 January 1860 in Cheetham, Manchester, England. Her father, Edward Hull, was from County Antrim, and her mother, Catherine Henrietta Hull (née Cooke), was from Cheltenham. Hull had 3 sisters and 2 brothers. Hull's paternal grandfather, John Dawson Hull, was a Protestant minister and a poet. Whilst in Manchester, the family lived at 147 York Street in Cheetham. The family moved to Dublin while Hull was a child. She was likely educated at home before attending Alexandra College, Dublin from 1877 to 1882. She attended courses on electricity, power and light during the summer of 1879 at the Royal College of Science, Dublin.

She died at her home, 3 Camp View, Wimbledon Common on 13 January 1935. Her funeral took place at the chapel of Wimbledon cemetery, Gap Road.

== Career ==
In her early thirties, Hull moved to London where she met Standish Hayes O'Grady. O'Grady taught Hull Irish and encouraged her to take up Celtic studies. She went on to study under Holger Pedersen, Kuno Meyer, and Robin Flower. She became a member of both the Gaelic League and Irish Literary Society, going on to be elected president of the Irish Literary Society on 29 March 1915.

On 26 April 1898, she was a co-founder of the Irish Texts Society for the publication of early manuscripts. Douglas Hyde was President, Frederick York Powell was Chairman, and Norma Borthwick and Hull were the secretaries. Hull was honorary secretary for nearly thirty years. She sat on the council of The Folklore Society, served as secretary of the Royal Asiatic Society, and was a member of the Viking Club. In 1931 she was awarded a D.Litt. honoris causa by the National University of Ireland.

With Lionel Johnson, Hull was the editor of The Irish Home Reading Magazine. Her first publication in this magazine was in May 1894, "The fate of the Children of Lir". She published books from 1898 to 1929, though her treatment of Irish sources was criticised by Séamus Ó Duilearga. Her work was also published in a number of literary newspapers and journals, such as Celtic Review, Literary World, Folklore Journal, The Saga Book of the Viking Club and The New Ireland Review. She served as editor to the Lives of the Celtic Saints series, and regularly wrote reviews for The Times.

She wrote the English versification for the Irish hymn "Rop tú mo baile" in 1912, known as the hymn Be Thou My Vision. Hull also played the organ. Sgéalta Thomáis Uí Chathasaigh, a special volume from the Irish Texts Society, was dedicated to Hull.

== Published works ==
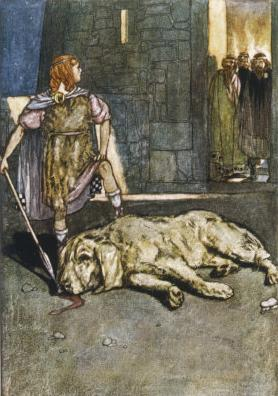
"Cuchulain Slays the Hound of Culain", illustration by Stephen Reid from Eleanor Hull's The Boys' Cuchulain, 1904

Her published works include:

- Hull, Eleanor, ed. (1898), The Cuchullin Saga in Irish Literature
- Hull, Eleanor (1904), The Boys' Cúchullain
- Hull, Eleanor (1904), "Pagan Ireland", Epochs of Irish History, no. I
- Hull, Eleanor (1905), "Early Christian Ireland", Epochs of Irish History, no. II
- Hull, Eleanor (1906), A Text Book of Irish Literature, vol. Part I
- Hull, Eleanor (1906), A Text Book of Irish Literature, vol. Part II
- Hull, Eleanor (1911), Cuchulain, the hound of Ulster
- Hull, Eleanor (1912), The Poem-Book of the Gael
- Hull, Eleanor (1913), The Northmen in Britain
- Hull, Eleanor (1931) [1926], A History of Ireland and her People , 2 volumes
- Hull, Eleanor (1929), Folklore of the British Isles
