= High Pasture Cave =

Cave and archaeological site in the United Kingdom

- Uamh An Ard-Achaidh
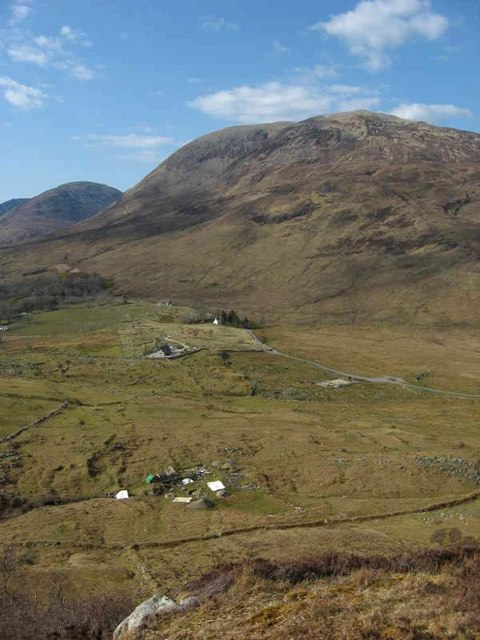
- High Pasture Cave

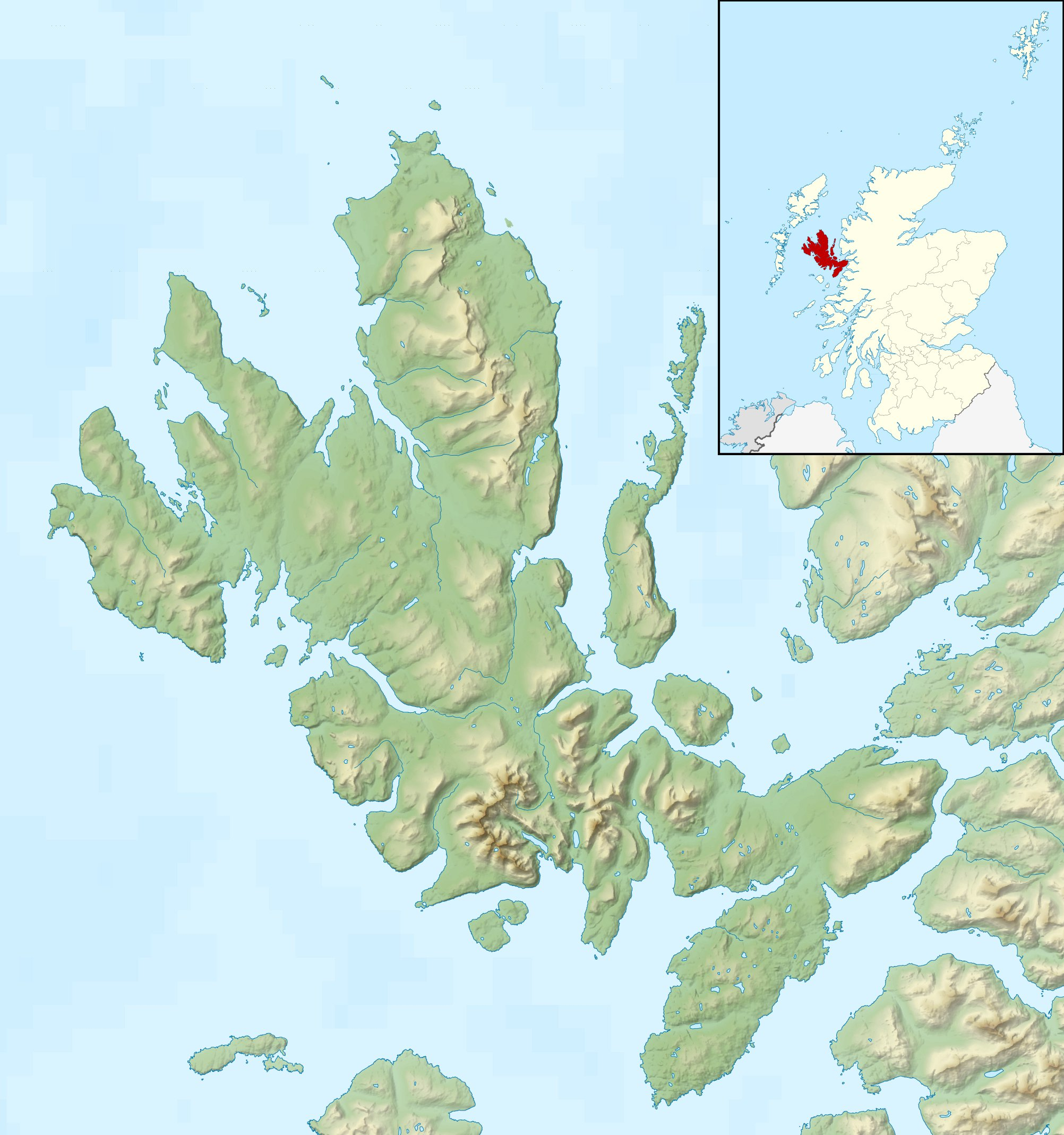
- Location in Scotland High Pasture Cave (Scotland)
- 57°12′50″N 6°0′40″W
- Type: limestone
- Periods: Mesolithic, Iron Age
- Associated with: Paleo Humans
- Location: Kilbride, island of Skye
- Region: Scotland
- Part of: Red Cuillin

Site notes
- Length: 320 m (1,050 ft)
- Excavation dates: 1972, 2003
- Archaeologists: Steven Birch

High Pasture Cave (Gaelic: Uamh An Ard-Achaidh) is an archaeological site on the island of Skye, Scotland. Human presence is documented since the Mesolithic, and remains, including Iron Age structures, point to ritual veneration of either the landscape or deities associated with the place. The cave system extends to about 320 metres (1,050 feet) of accessible passages

== Site ==
The cave is about one kilometre (5/8 mile) southeast of the village of Torrin, near Kilbride. The entrance of the cave lies in a narrow valley on the northern slopes of the mountain of Beinn Dùbhaich, east of the Red Cuillin hills, and is formed by erosion of Durness limestone.

The interior is accessed via a natural shaft about six metres (20 feet) deep that leads into the main cave, which appears to have been in use between 1,200 BC and 200 BC (mid-Bronze Age to late Iron Age). After about 80 m (260 ft) there is a fork, with a rocky, dry passage on the right. In 2002 the cave explorer Steven Birch discovered broken crockery and bones. Previous visitors to the cave had thrown this material aside in the attempts to find new ways. Birch recognized the value of the find as well as the importance of the cave.

== Excavations ==
The cave system was originally excavated in 1972 by students of the University of London Speleological Society. A full year of excavation then took place in 2003, mainly supported by Historic Scotland, and continuing project work was under the supervision of Steven Birch and Martin Wildgoose.

== Finds ==
A wide variety of artifacts has been recovered from the cave and its surroundings, including stone items, bone, antler and residue of metalworkings along with well-preserved faunal remains.

Arrowheads left behind by nomadic hunters suggest occupation during the Mesolithic period (about 6,000 to 7,000 years ago). It was only occasionally occupied during the Neolithic and the Bronze Age until about 800 BC, when the site became more frequented and a large fireplace was set up in front of its entrance. The entrance area also seems to have been used for ceremonies or storage of personal items.

During the following 1000 years, activities and ash deposits of the fire site threatened to block the entrance of the cave. A staircase about four metres (13 feet) in length was built to permit entry to the cave. Hundreds of finds (bronze, bone and antler needles, glass and ivory beads) around the fire pit and the cave floor point to a place of intense activity. This lasted until about 40 BC, when the stairs were completely filled with boulders and earth. The skeleton of a woman along with a four to five month-old fetus and a nine to ten month-old child were placed on top of the filling.

In 2012 a piece of carved wood thought to be the bridge of a lyre was discovered. The small burnt and broken piece has been dated to approximately 300 BC and is the earliest find of a stringed instrument in western Europe. The notches where the strings would have been placed can be easily distinguished and according to Graeme Lawson of Cambridge Music Archaeological Research the find "pushes the history of complex music [in Britain] back more than a thousand years". If dating and attribution are confirmed, this object may indicate contacts between local Celtic people and Mediterranean cultures.

== Notes ==
- Recent Paper on High Pasture Cave by Birch et al., 2019
