= Caisteal Maol =

- Caisteal (Scottish Gaelic)
- Castle Moil, Castle Maol, Dun Akyn, Dunakin Castle, Dun Haakon, Castle Dunakin
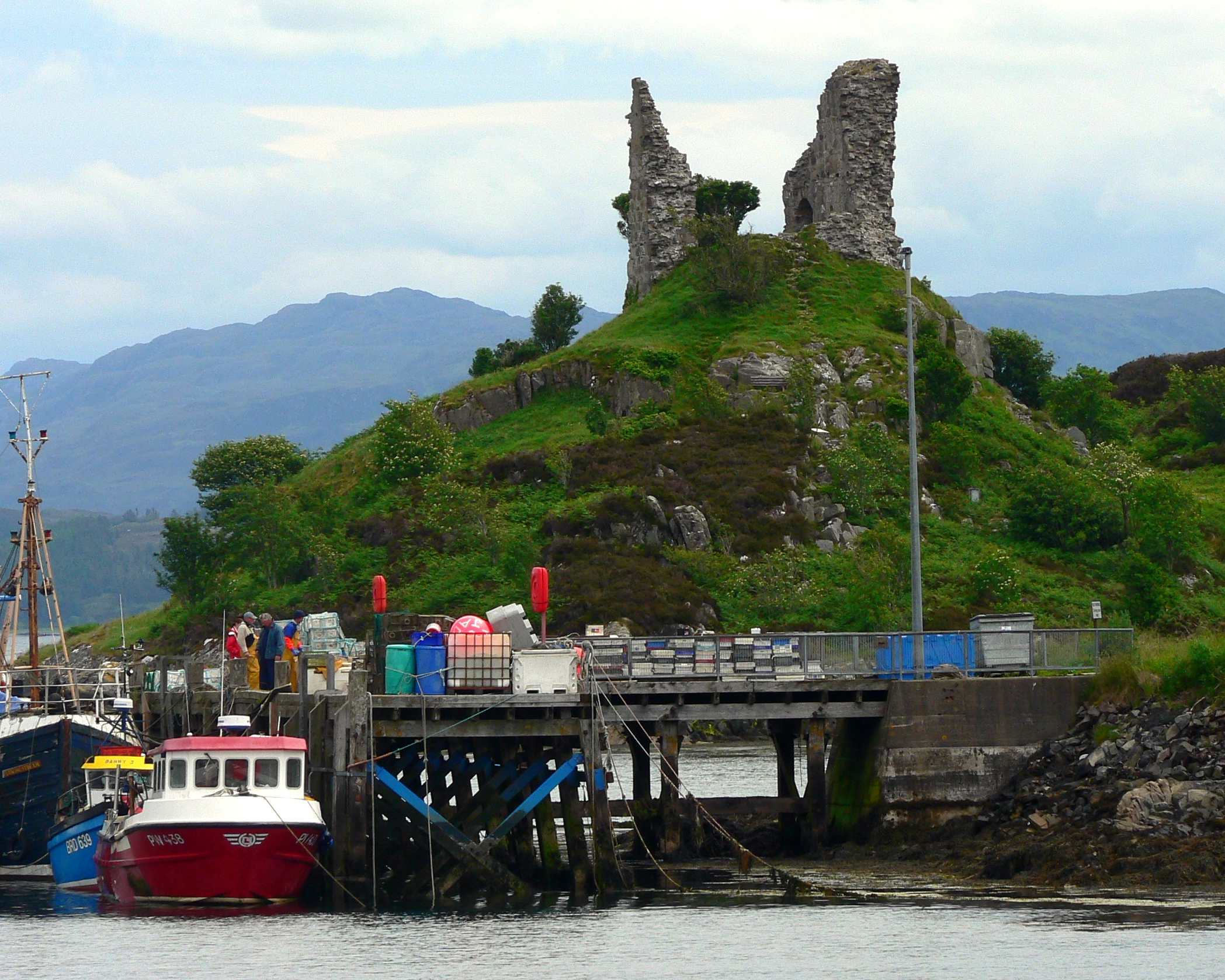
- Caisteal Maol ruin
- Interactive map of Caisteal Maol
- 57°16′19″N 5°43′15″W
- Type: Castle
- Location: Kyleakin, Isle of Skye, Scotland

History
- Founded: 15th century (present structure)
- Original use: Fortress

Site notes
- Architectural style: Rectangular keep
- Current use: Ruins
- Governing body: Skye & Lochalsh District Council's Museums Service

Listed Building – Category A

Caisteal Maol (Gaelic: Caisteal, 'Castle', Maol, 'bare') is a ruined castle located near the harbour of the village of Kyleakin, Isle of Skye, Scotland. It is also known as Castle Moil, Castle Maol, Dun Akyn, Dunakin Castle, Dun Haakon and Castle Dunakin.

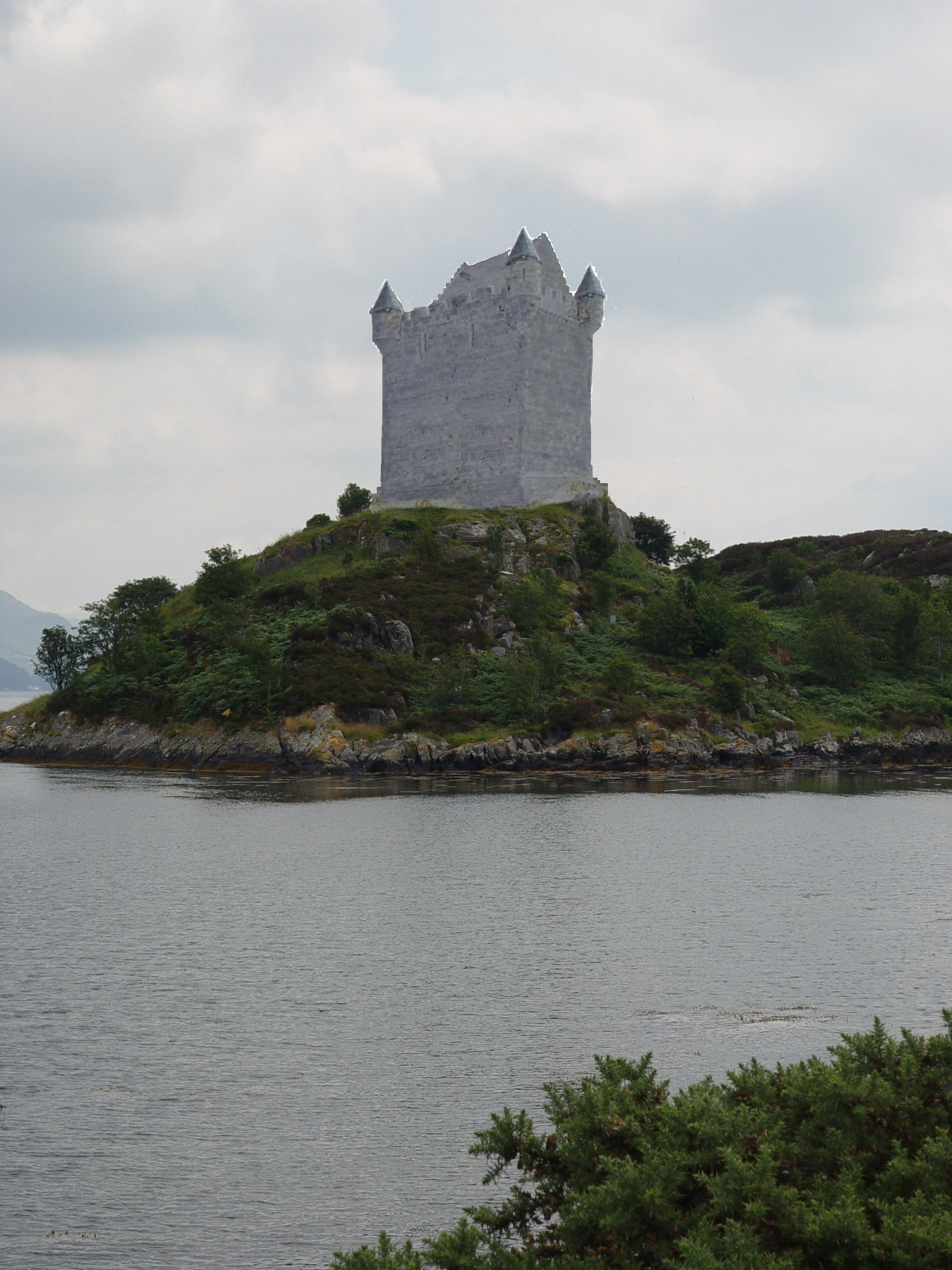
Recreation of the 16th century exterior

== History ==
The castle, an ancient seat of the Mackinnon clan, was a fortress commanding the strait of Kyle Akin between Skye and the mainland, through which all ships had to pass or else attempt the stormy passage of The Minch. The present building dates back to the 15th century, but is traditionally reputed to be of much earlier origin.

According to that tradition, Alpín mac Echdach's great-grandson Findanus, the 4th MacKinnon chief, brought Dunakin into the clan around the year 900 by marrying a Norse princess nicknamed 'Saucy Mary'. Findanus and his bride ran a heavy chain across the sound and levied a toll on all shipping vessels. The Princess lies buried on Beinn na Caillich on Skye, her face reputedly turned towards Norway.

Whatever the veracity of the castle's traditional history, there is good reason for supposing the existence of a connection of some kind with Norway. King Haakon IV is thought to have assembled his fleet of longships there before the Battle of Largs in 1263 (hence the name Kyleakin – Haakon's kyle). Haakon's defeat at Largs effectively ended Norse domination of the Scottish islands. Medieval and early modern documents also refer to the castle itself as Dunakin (Dun-Haakon), which is again strongly suggestive of a Norse connection.

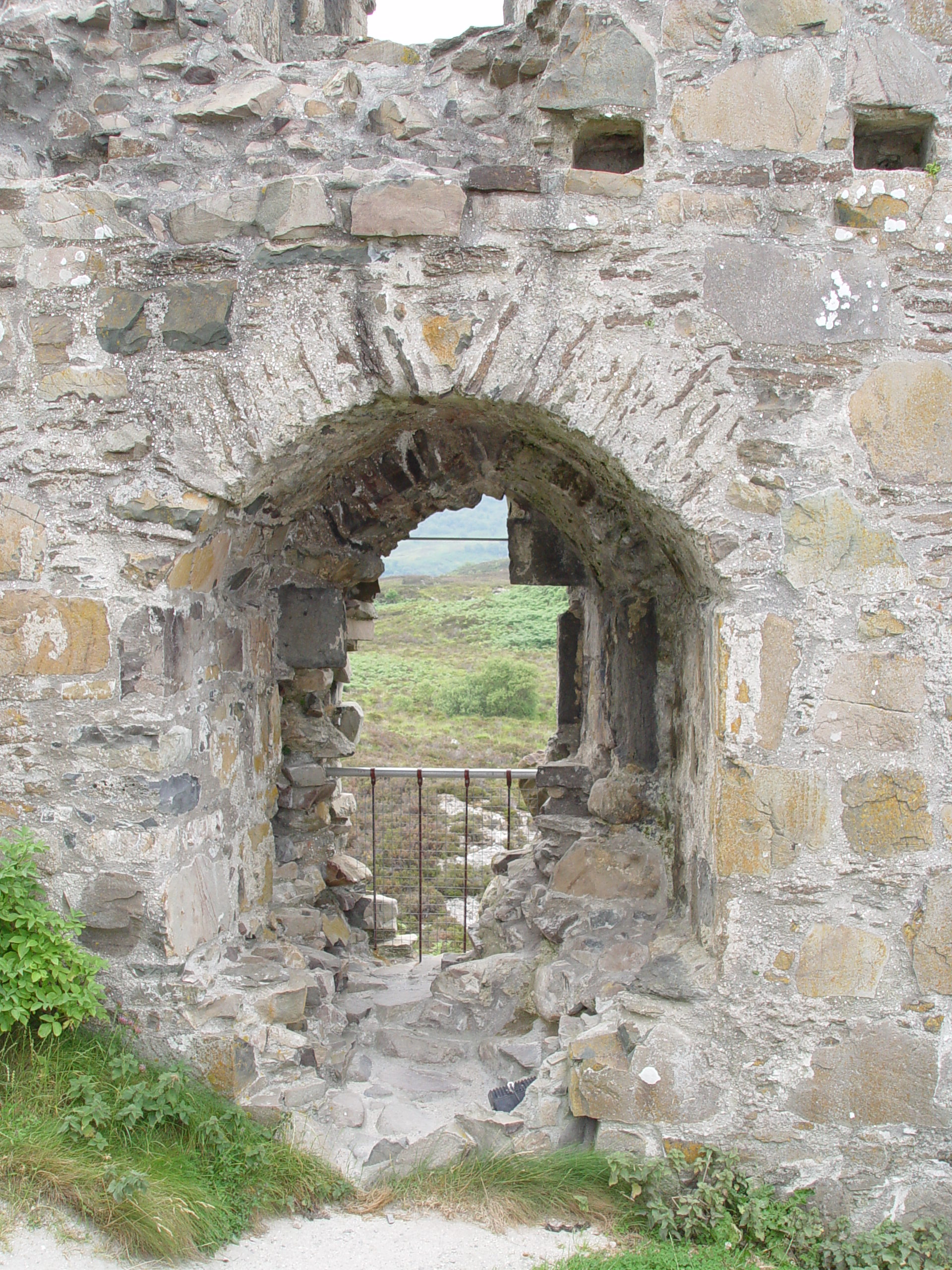
Interior view of the large window on the first level – the thickness of the walls is apparent

The present structure is of late 15th or early 16th century construction. This is supported by historical documents and carbon dating. In 1513, a meeting of chiefs was held here and they agreed to support Donald MacDonald as Lord of the Isles. The last occupant of the castle was Neill MacKinnon, nephew of the 26th chief of the clan (c. 1601).

== Description ==
The castle occupies a headland above the village of Kyleakin facing the village of Kyle of Lochalsh across the strait. It is a simple rectangular keep of three stories. The unexplored basement level is filled with rubble and other debris and is believed to have contained the kitchen. The visitor today enters on the main level where the public dining space would have been. Stairs would have led up to the private apartments above.

The castle is almost completely ruined. In 1949 and 1989 parts of the ruins broke away in storms. The remaining ruins have been secured to prevent further deterioration. No excavation of the ruins has been carried out, nor are planned. On 14 February 2018, a lightning strike destroyed part of the ruins; they have subsequently been stabilised.

== Sources ==
Miket and Roberts, The Mediaeval Castles of Skye and Lochalsh (2nd edition, Birlinn Ltd, 2007)
