= Kyleakin =

Village in Highland, Scotland

Coordinates: 57.273°N 5.728°W

Kyleakin: Scottish Gaelic: Caol Àcain
- A view of the village, from the Skye Bridge

- Location within the Isle of Skye
- OS grid reference: NG752263
- Civil parish: Strath
- Council area: Highland
- Lieutenancy area: Ross and Cromarty
- Country: Scotland
- Sovereign state: United Kingdom
- Post town: ISLE OF SKYE
- Postcode district: IV41
- Dialling code: 01599
- Police: Scotland
- Fire: Scottish
- Ambulance: Scottish
- UK Parliament: Inverness, Skye and West Ross-shire
- Scottish Parliament: Ross, Skye and Inverness West

Kyleakin (/kaɪlˈɑːkɪn/; Scottish Gaelic: Caol Àcain) is a village situated on the east coast of the Isle of Skye in the Inner Hebrides, Scotland. The village is along the strait of Kyle Akin, opposite the northwest Scottish mainland town of Kyle of Lochalsh. Kyleakin is within the parish of Strath, also known as Strath Swordale.

== History ==
The etymology of Kyleakin is disputed. The most popular account is that the name is derived from 'Strait of Haakon', named after King Haakon IV of Norway, whose fleet moored there prior to the Battle of Largs in 1263, the battle which ended Norwegian rule of the island. Another possible origin is from Acunn, a Celtic mythological hero.

In the early 19th century, Lord Macdonald conceived a grandiose plan for the development of Kyleakin, to be re-christened "New Liverpool". A contemporary print, intended to illustrate his plans, shows row upon row of tenement buildings but the project never came to fruition.

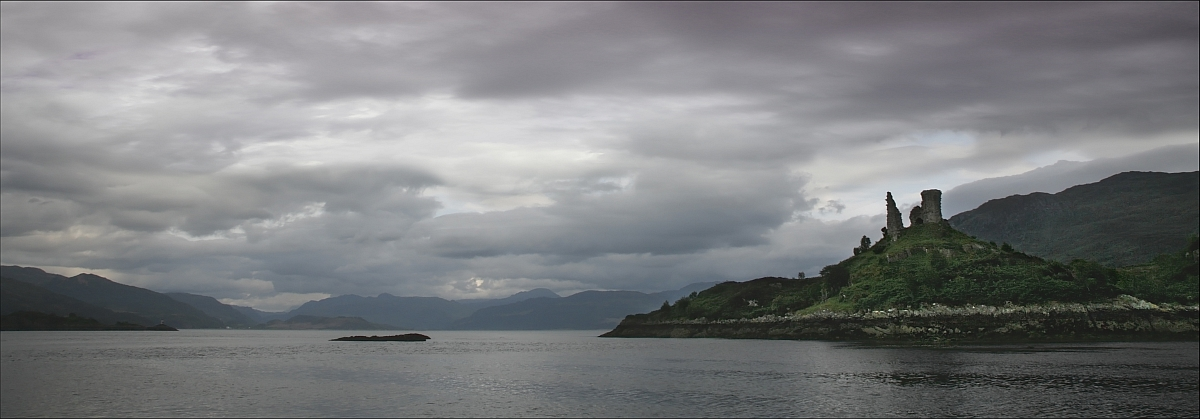
Kyleakin – Caisteal Maol

The village of Kyleakin is also the site of Castle Moil, a ruined fortress built in the late 15th century. Legend states that there were much older fortifications on the site, and that it was originally built for a Norwegian princess known as 'Saucy Mary' who would charge a toll to any boat using the narrow channel by hanging a chain from the castle to the mainland to prevent unpaid crossings. Her remains are said to be buried on the top of Beinn na Caillich (Gaelic for "mountain of the old woman"), the large mountain to the rear of the castle ruins. However, some local historians contest this and claim that she was laid to rest by another mountain of the same name a few miles west in the village of Broadford, so that she may forever face the land of her birth.

According to the poet Alexander Smith, in his 19th century works "A Summer in Skye", the village was the first in Britain to successfully grow watermelons in hothouses (then, a popular means of growing in adverse conditions).

== Transport ==
From 1841 to 16 October 1995 a ferry service operated from Kyleakin to the mainland across the narrow strait of Loch Alsh, until it was replaced by the controversial Skye Bridge. Initially a toll bridge, the tolls were discontinued in 2004 following protests by local people.

== Sport ==
Kyleakin plays host to Kyleakin Football Club, who won the Skye and Lochalsh Bagshaw league in 2009, legendary goalkeeper, Lennie Chiffers, is also part of an accomplished bowls team in the village. It also hosts a new year football match between bachelors and married men. It is also a breeding ground for shinty players, including John "Slippy" Finlayson, who won the Camanachd Cup with Skye Camanachd in 1990, and Steven Morrison, Scotland Under-21 Captain. Kyleakin Primary School are also the only primary school age team to have ever won the Mod Cup in 2001.

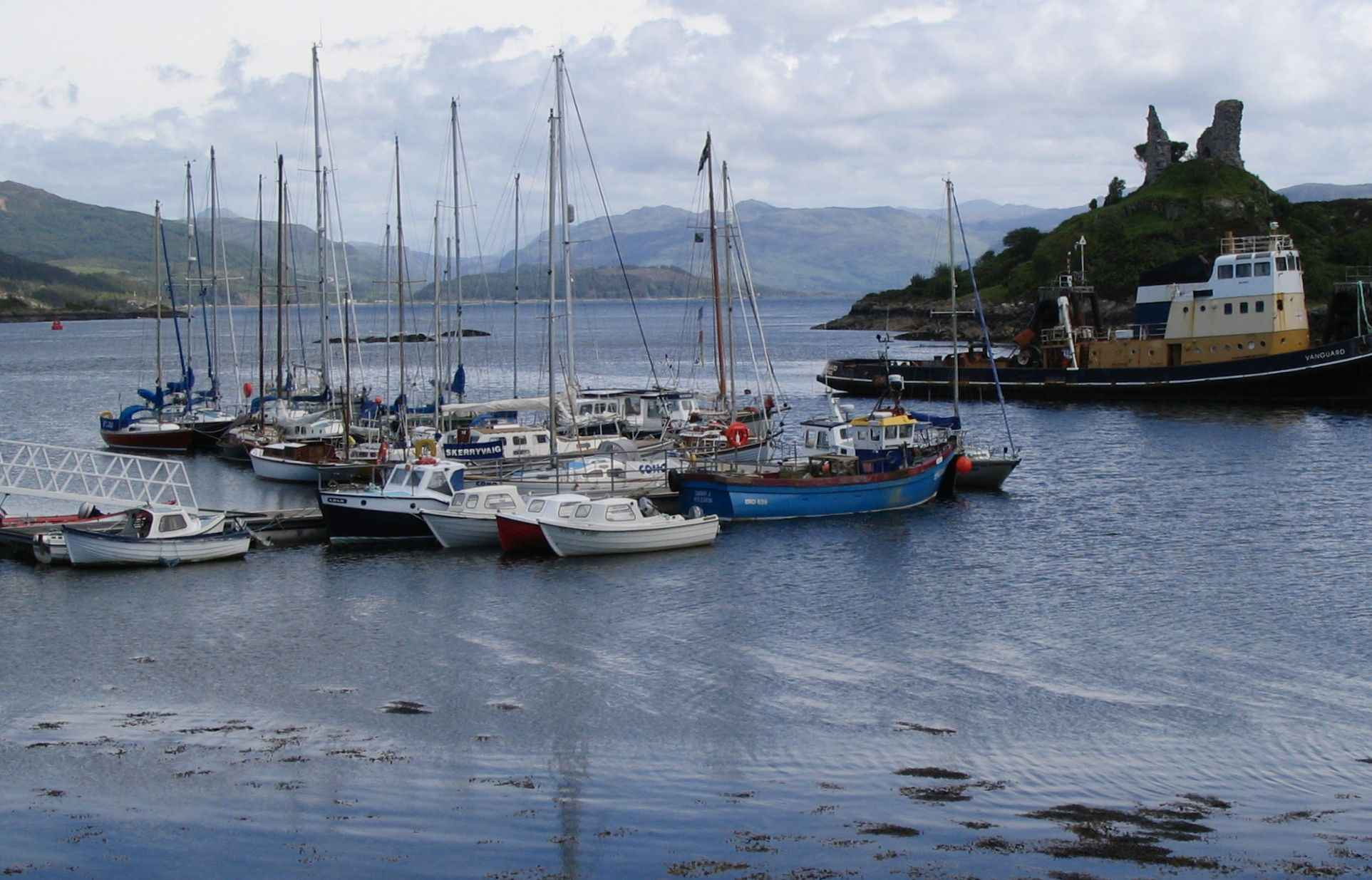
Caisteal Maol.

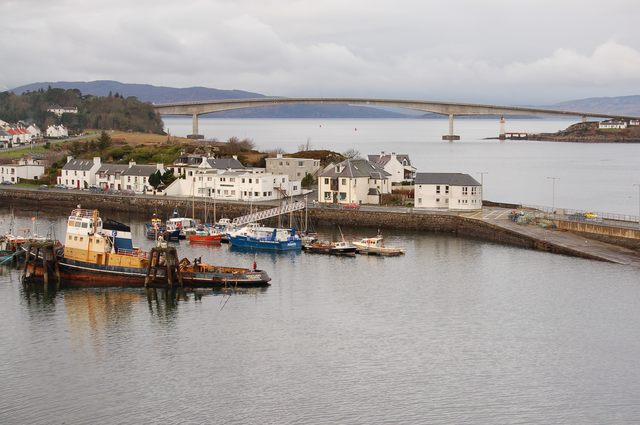
The Skye Bridge spanning Kyle Akin.

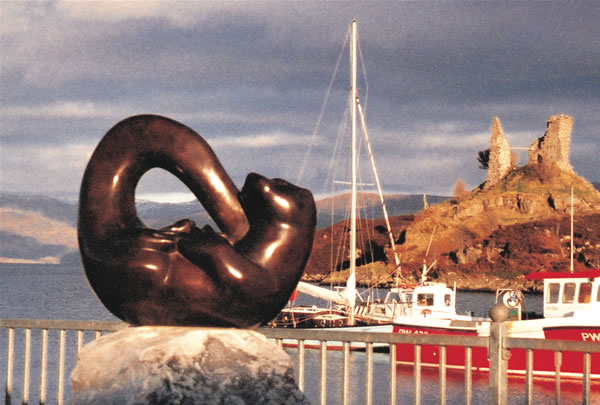
Bronze Otter at Kyleakin, by sculptor Laurence Broderick

== See also ==
- Caisteal Maol
