= Kilbride, Skye =

Coordinates: 57.211°N 5.994°W

Kilbride: Scottish Gaelic: Cille Bhrìghde
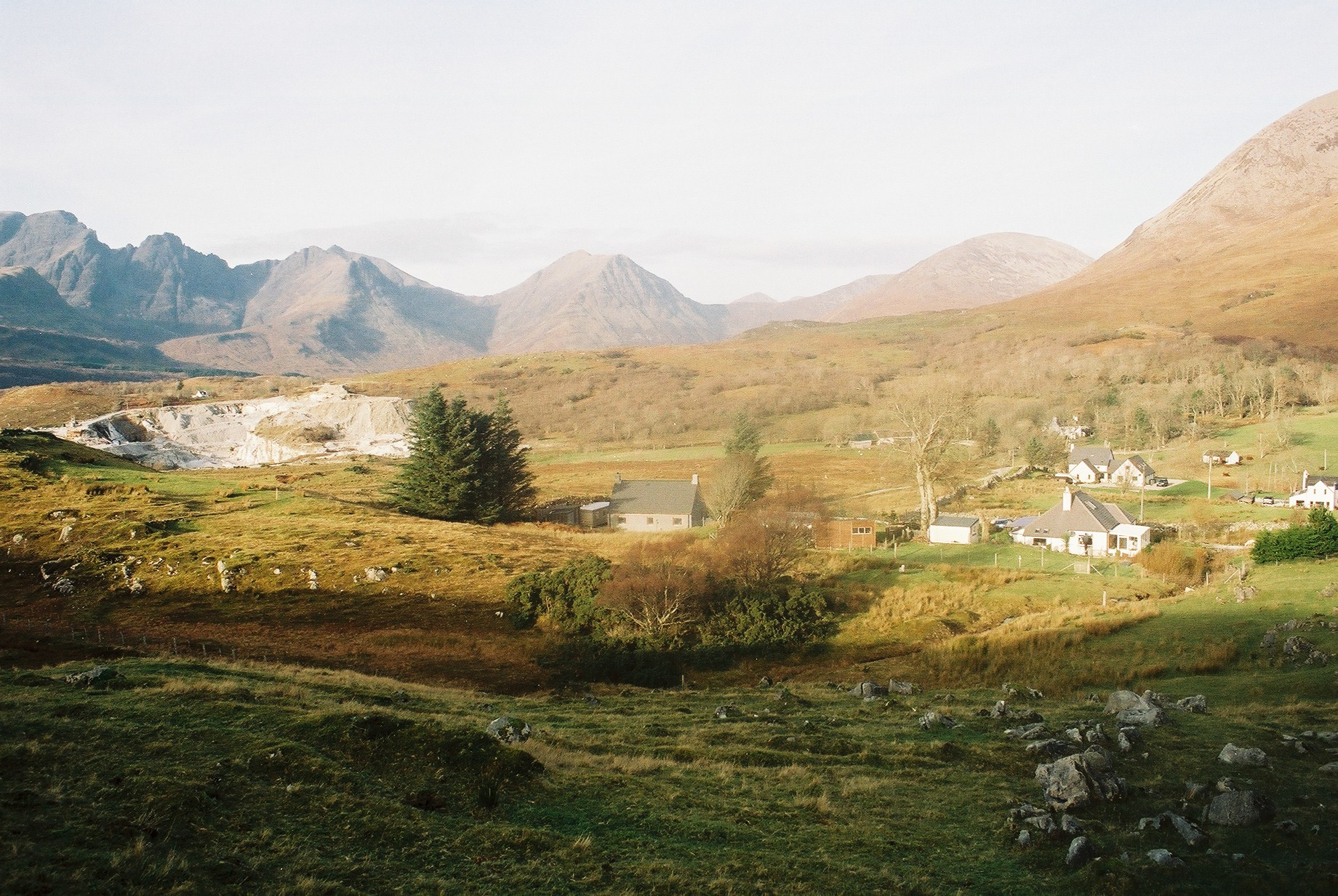
- Kilbride, viewed from Braes of Kilbride

- Location within the Isle of Skye
- OS grid reference: NG5920
- Council area: Highland
- Lieutenancy area: Ross and Cromarty
- Country: Scotland
- Sovereign state: United Kingdom
- Post town: ISLE OF SKYE
- Postcode district: IV49
- Dialling code: 01471
- Police: Scotland
- Fire: Scottish
- Ambulance: Scottish
- UK Parliament: Ross, Skye and Lochaber
- Scottish Parliament: Ross, Skye and Inverness West

Kilbride (Scottish Gaelic: Cille Bhrìghde, or the Church of Saint Bride) is a small township in Strath Swordale, Isle of Skye, Scotland.

The township is situated in a pocket of fertile lime-rich soil, between the Red Hills to the north and Beinn an Dubhaich and the Suidhisnis peninsula to the south. It has been inhabited since ancient times; there is a standing stone (Clach na h-Annait), the site of an ancient chapel (or annat) and an ancient well (Tobar na h-Annait) with a stone cover. Newlywed brides were, according to local tradition, brought to the well to ensure fertility.

On-going archaeological excavations since 2003 at High Pasture Cave, on the common grazing east of Kilbride, have revealed continuous use of the site from roughly 700BC to 120AD, for possibly ceremonial purposes centred in and around a large burnt mound which had the cave at its heart. Valuable artefacts, including pottery (some of it Roman in origin), a spearhead and components of an ancient lyre, had been carefully placed on the floor of the cave. At the end of its period of constant use, the cave was carefully back-filled and the remains of two human beings, one woman and one child, were interred over the entrance.

The surrounding landscape is exceptionally rich in Iron Age roundhouses, several of which were surveyed in 2010.

Another ancient well, Tobar Tà, features in a prophecy by Kenneth MacKenzie, the Brahan Seer, who was alive in the 17th century:

Tobar sin, is Tobar Tà
Tobar aig an cuirear blàr;
Marbhar Torcuil nan trì Torcuil
Air latha fliuch aig Tobar Tà.

"That well, it's Tobar Tà, a well where a battle will be fought, and Torquil of the three Torquils shall be killed, on a wet day at Tobar Tà". Tobar Tà, now just a small boggy area on the common grazing, is about a kilometer east of the township, next to the Broadford road.

In 1745–1746, three men from the township took part in the Jacobite rising, fighting for Prince Charles Edward Stuart in the regiment formed by Iain Dubh MacKinnon, chief of the MacKinnons of Strath. Their names (anglicised from the Gaelic) were: John MacInnes, Alexander MacLean, and William Ross.

== Gallery ==
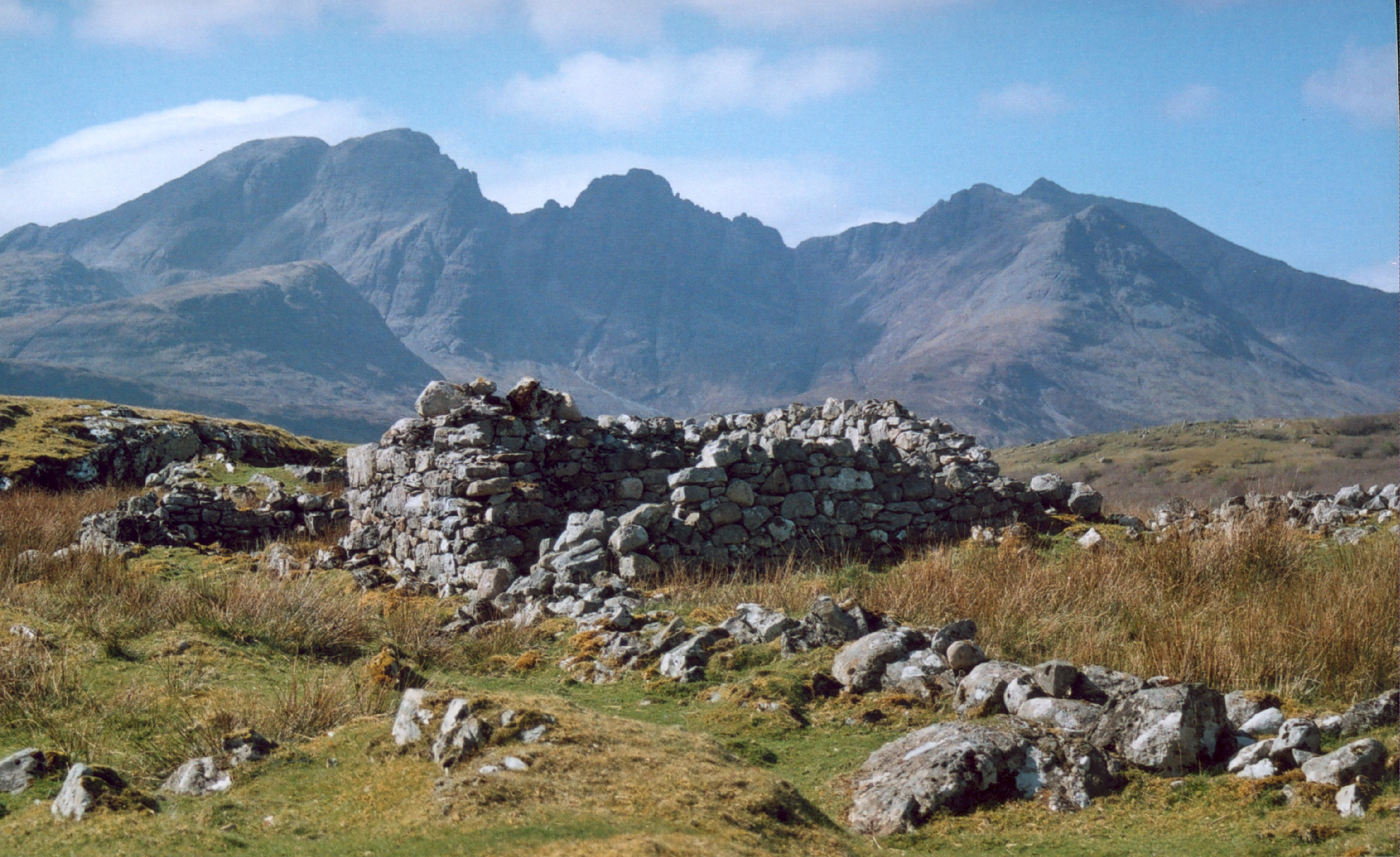
Bathaich a' ghìobaire, Kilbride. Blaven range in background

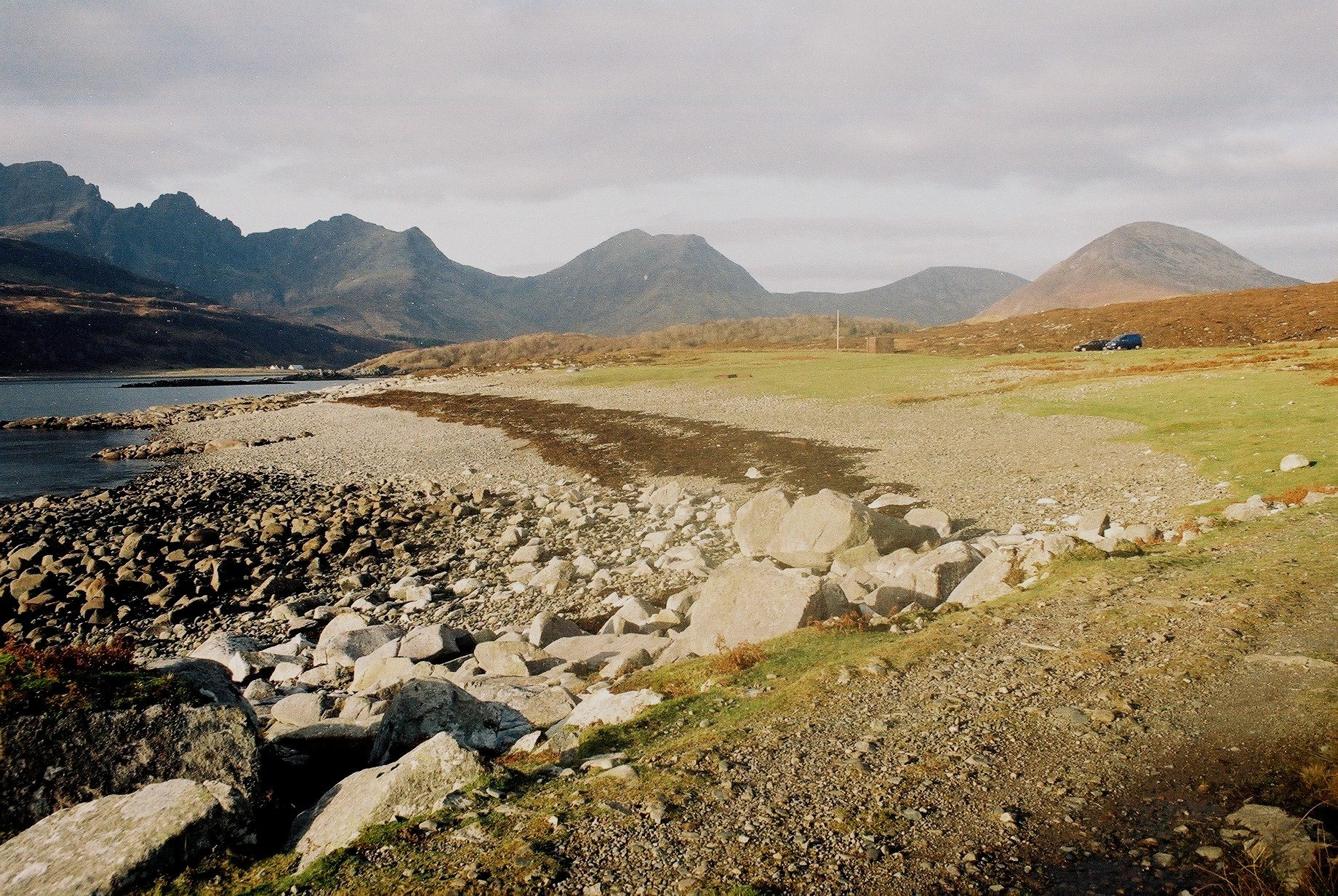
Camas Malaig, Kilbride

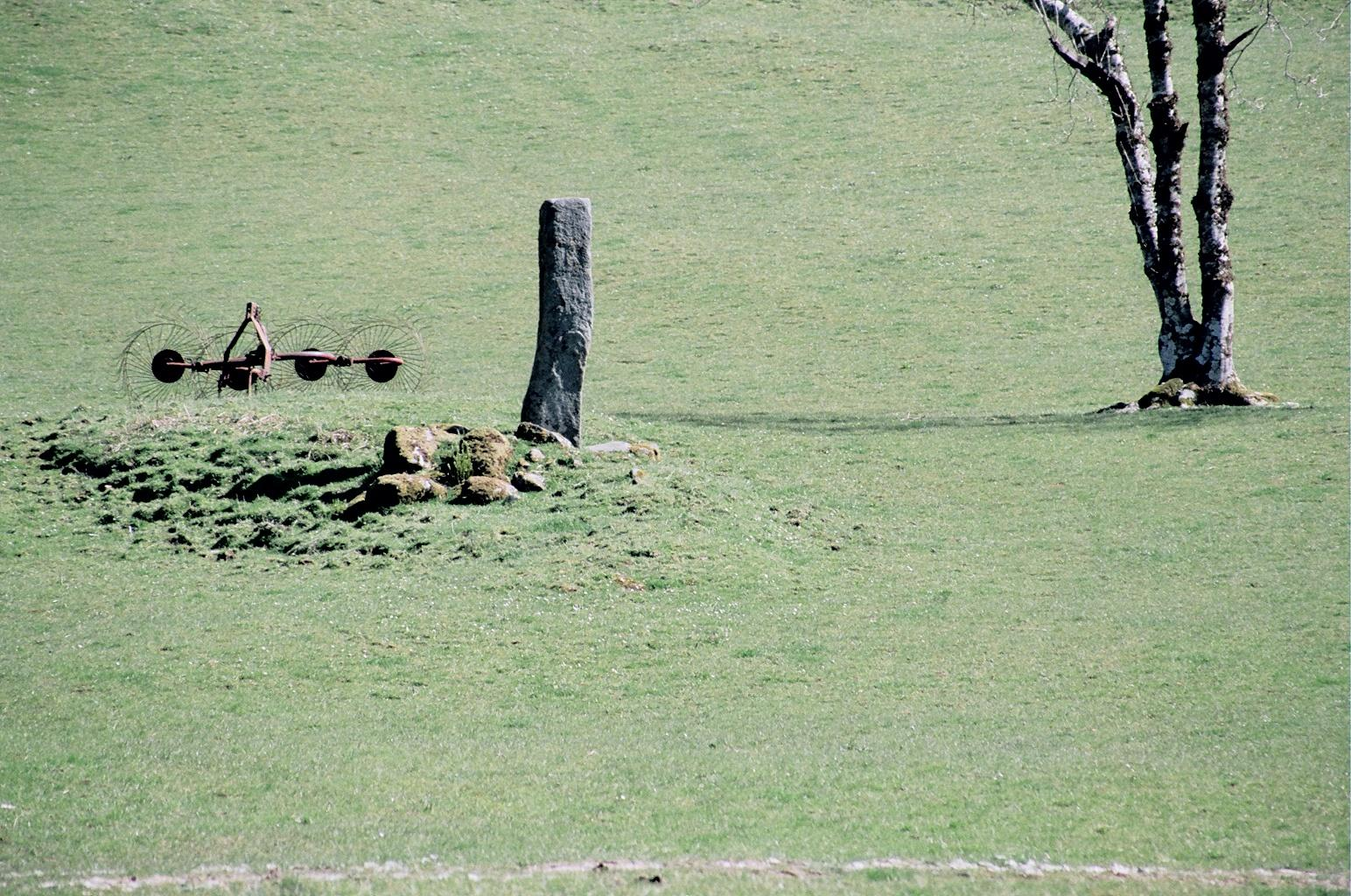
Clach na h-Annait
