= Clan Mackinnon =

Highland Scottish clan

Clan MacKinnon
- Clann MacFhionghain
- Motto: Audentes Fortuna Juvat (from Latin: "Fortune assists the daring").
- Slogan: Cuimhnich bàs Alpein (translation from Gaelic: "Remember the death of Alpin").

Profile
- Region: Inner Hebrides
- Plant badge: Scots Pine.

Chief
- Madam Anne Gunhild MacKinnon of MacKinnon
- 38th Chief of the Name and Arms of MacKinnon. (Mac Fhionghain)
- Historic seat: Caisteal Maol
Septs of Clan MacKinnon
Love, Low, McInnon, MacKinning, MacKinven, MacMorran, MacSherrie, Sherrie, Sherry
Clan branches
MacKinnon of Borreraig
MacKinnon of Corriechatachan
MacKinnon of Elgol
Mackinnon of Gambell, Skye
Mackinnon of Keanouchrach (Chinn Uachdaraich), Scalpay, Inner Hebrides
Mackinnon of Kyle
Mackinnon of Mishnish, on Mull
Allied clans
Clan MacDonald of Sleat
Rival clans
Clan MacLeod
Clan Campbell
Clan MacLean

Clan MacKinnon (Scottish Gaelic: Clann MhicFhionghain [ˈkʰl̪ˠãũn̪ˠ vĩçˈkʲiŋɣɛn]) is a Highland Scottish clan from the islands of Mull and Skye, in the Inner Hebrides.

Popular tradition gives the clan a Dalriadic Gaelic origin. The 19th-century historian W. F. Skene named the clan as one of the seven clans of Siol Alpin, who according to Skene could all trace their ancestry back to Alpin, father of Cináed mac Ailpín. Popular tradition has been until recently to consider Cináed mac Ailpín the first King of Scots and a Gael, however recent research speculates Cináed was a Pictish king and possibly even a Pict himself. Sir Iain Moncreiffe of that Ilk speculated that Clan MacKinnon belonged to the kindred of Saint Columba, noting the MacKinnon arms bore the hand of the saint holding the Cross, and the several Mackinnon abbots of Iona.

Though little is known of the early history of the clan, it is likely to have served under the Lords of the Isles. After the forfeiture of the Lordship of the Isles in 1493 the clan would have gained some independence, and was at various times allied or at war with neighbouring clans such as the MacLeans and the MacDonalds. The clan supported the Jacobites in the 17th and 18th centuries, and tradition has the chief of the clan aiding in the escape of Bonnie Prince Charlie in his flight to France. Because of their support for the last Jacobite rising the MacKinnon chiefs lost the last of their ancient clan lands.

== History ==
A proposed descent of the seven clans of Siol Alpin

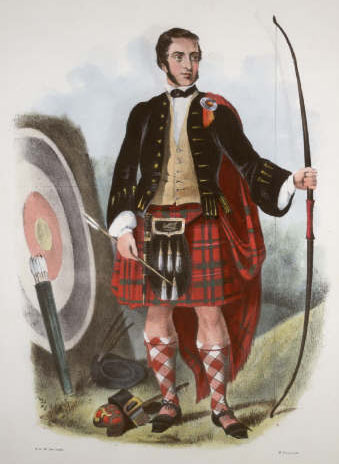
A Victorian era, romanticised depiction of a member of the clan by R. R. McIan, from The Clans of the Scottish Highlands, published in 1845.

=== Myth and legend ===
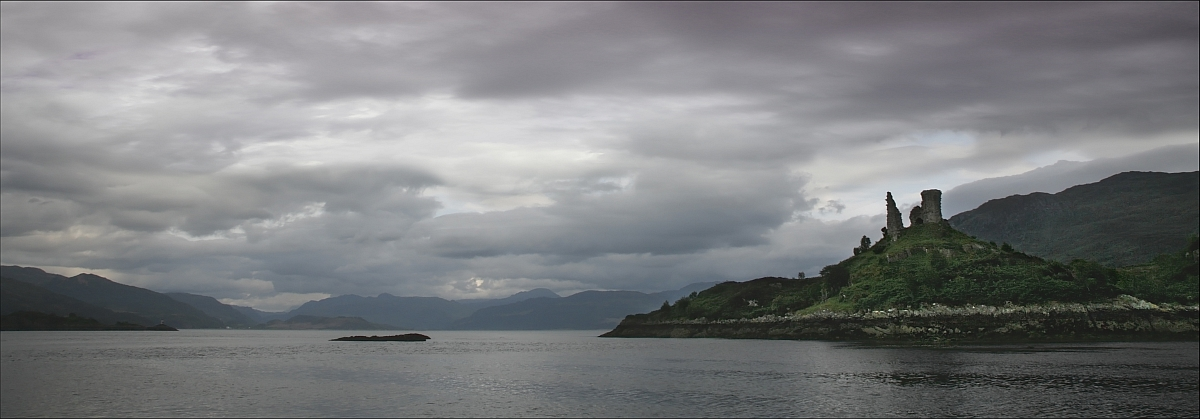
Caisteal Maol near Kyleakin.

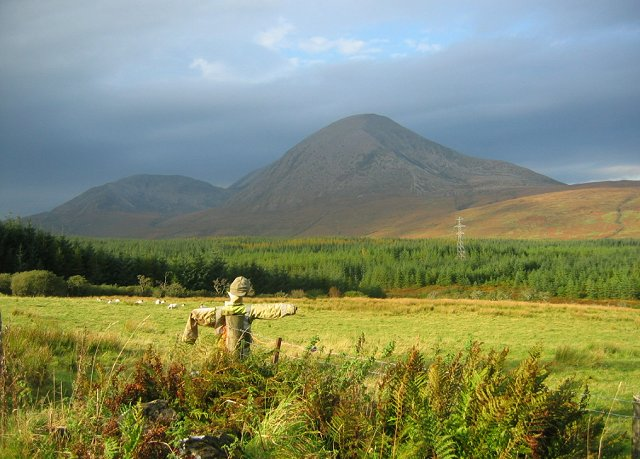
Beinn na Caillich and Goir a' Bhlair

According to legend, the castle of Dunakin (today known as Caisteal Maol), near Kyleakin, was built by a Norwegian princess known as Saucy Mary, who married Findanus the claimed ancestor of Clan Mackinnon. The princess was to have collected the tolls of ships sailing through the narrows between the castle and the mainland, though Norse ships were exempt from her toll. To ensure that her taxes were paid a chain was stretched across the kyle. On her death she was buried beneath a cairn on Beinn na Caillich (the mountain of the old woman).

=== Origin of the name ===
The surname MacKinnon is an Anglicisation of the Gaelic Mac Fhionghuin, which is a patronymic form of the Gaelic personal name meaning "fair born" or "fair son". This personal name appears in the Book of Deer, in the genitive form as Finguni. In the Annals of the Four Masters, a Fínghin, described as "anchorite and Bishop of Iona", is recorded as dying in 966. Middle Irish forms of the name are Finghin and Finnguine, while the Modern Irish is Findgaine. These names are thought to derive from the prehistoric Gaelic Vindo-gonio-s (translation: "fair-born"). The Anglicised MacKinnon can also derive from the Gaelic Mac Ionmhuinn, a similar patronymic name meaning "son of the beloved one". In consequence some "Mackinvens" have Anglicised their name to Love or Low (however most Love or Low surnames are not derived this way, having no connection with the MacKinnons).

=== Wars of Scottish Independence ===
According to the Collins Scottish Clan & Family Encyclopedia the Mackinnons gave shelter to Robert the Bruce when he was a fugitive escaping to Carrick. After Bruce's victory at the Battle of Bannockburn in 1314 the Mackinnons were rewarded with land on the Isle of Skye. The Mackinnon chiefs then lived at Dunringall Castle and were styled "of Strathardale".

=== Origins of the clan ===
Little is known of the early history of the clan. The 19th-century historian William Forbes Skene gave the clan a descent linked to the clans of Siol Alpin. He claimed that the Finguine who appears in the MS 1450 was the brother of the Anrias of whom the Clan Gregor claim descent from in about 1130. Because of the clan's early association with the Lords of the Isles there is no trace of early history of the Mackinnons as an independent clan. On the forfeiture of the last Lord of the Isles in the 1490s the clan at last gained some independence, though the Clan Mackinnon was always a minor clan and never gained any great power. According to Skene, the MS 1450 proved that Clan Mackinnon was a branch of Clan Gregor. Skene maintained that the Finguine listed, was the brother of Anrias in the Clan Gregor genealogy. The genealogy within the manuscript is as follows (original spelling in italics): Niall, son of Colum, son of Gillabrigde, son of Eogan, son of Gillabrigde, son of Saineagain, son of Finlaeie, son of Finguine, from whom sprung clanfinguin, son of Cormac, son of Airbertaig, son of Muircheach, son of Fearchair oig.

According to the historian Donald Gregory the first authentic record of the clan is found in an indenture between John of Islay, Lord of the Isles and the Lord of Lorn, in 1354. In the indenture, Lorn agreed to hand over the Isle of Mull and other lands, if the castle of Cairn na Burgh, located on Cairn na Burgh Mòr in the Treshnish Isles, was not delivered into the keeping of any of Clan Finnon. Sometime after the death of John of Islay, Lord of the Isles, in 1386, John Mór (younger son of John of Islay) rebelled against his elder brother Domhnall, in an attempt to take the Lordship of the Isles for himself. According to a manuscript relating the history of the MacDonalds, written in the 17th century, it was Finnon, known as the Green Abbot, and "a subtle and wicked councillor", who persuaded John Mór to revolt against his brother. It further states that the eloquent Green Abbot then persuaded the MacLeans and MacLeods of Harris to aid in John Mór's revolt, and acquire islands for themselves. Though assisted by his allies, John Mor was defeated, and by 1395 had fled to Ireland. John Mór was later pardoned by his brother, though the MacDonald history states that the Green Abbot's kinsman, the MacKinnon chief, was hanged for his part. The Green Abbot himself, was spared only because he was a churchman, and spent the rest of his life imprisoned on Iona by the Macdonalds.

The earliest record of the MacKinnons is of Lachlan Makfingane, who witnessed a charter by Donald de Ile, dominus Insularum, to Hector Macgilleone, dominus de Doward, on 1 November 1409. Later in 1467, Lachlann M'Fynwyn de Myschenys, witnessed a charter by the Lord of the Isles. According to the 17th century MacDonald manuscript, in a description of the Lord of the Isles' Council of the Isles, "MacFinnon was obliged to see weights and measures adjusted".

The chief's crest is a boar's head erased, argent, holding in its mouth a deer's shankbone, proper. A Mackinnon legend that is supposed to explain the chief's crest is of a MacKinnon who was hunting on the shores of Loch Scavaig in Skye. After becoming separated from his hunting party the MacKinnon spent the night in a cave for shelter. While preparing some venison which he was about to cook over an open fire he was attacked by a wild boar which charged into the cave. MacKinnon then drove the butchered deer's leg into the mouth of the boar, jamming it open, before killing the wild animal.

=== Abbacy of Iona ===
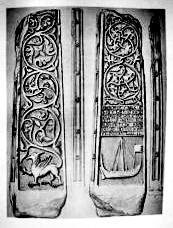
MacKinnon's Cross, Iona

The early clan seems to have had a close connection with the abbacy on the small Inner Hebridean island of Iona. The abbacy of Iona was first founded in 563 by Saint Columba, and many following abbots were selected from his kindred (Cenel Conaill: descendants of Conall Gulban, who was Columba's great-grandfather and the founder of Tír Conaill). Moncreiffe speculated that the MacKinnons were also of this kindred, and noted their coat of arms bore the hand of the saint holding the Cross. Several MacKinnons were Benedictine Abbots of Iona, who were leaders of the Benedictine monastic community on the island of Iona. Finghuine MacFhionghain (fl. 1357–1405), and Eoin MacFhionghain (John MacKinnon, son of Lachlan MacKinnon) (1467–1498) who was the last Benedictine Abbot of Iona. His tomb lies in Iona to this day, along with the shaft of a Celtic cross, known today as 'MacKinnon's Cross', dedicated in 1489 to himself and his father (Lauchlan), which is inscribed: "Hec Fingone: et: eivs: filii: Johannis: X: abbatis de Hy: facta: anno: Domini: måccccålxxxåixå".

=== 16th and 17th centuries ===
The Mackinnons regularly feuded with the Clan Maclean. However, after the forfeiture of the Lordship of the Isles the MacKinnons tended to follow the MacLeans of Duart, though occasionally the clan sided with the MacDonalds of Skye, in the MacDonald's battles with the MacLeods. The name of the chief of the clan in 1493 is unknown, though in 1515 the chief was Neil Mackinnon of Mishnish. Two years later, in 1517, Neil and several others, described as "kin, men, servants and partakers" of Lauchlan Maclean of Duart, were included in a remission which was obtained for their part in the rebellion of Sir Donald Macdonald of Lochalsh. In 1545, Ewen, the chief of the clan, was one of the barons and council of the Isles who swore allegiance to the King of England, at Knockfergus in Ireland. Donald Munro, High Dean of the Isles, in his A Description of the Western Isles of Scotland Called Hybrides, in 1549, described the MacKinnon controlled lands at that time. On Skye were the lands of "Straytsnardill" (Strathairdle, of which later Mackinnon chiefs were designated), and "the castill of Dunnakyne perteining to Mackynnoun; the castill Dunringill, perteining to the said Mackynnoun". Munro also described the neighbouring island of Pabay as follows, "At the shore of Sky foresaid, lyes ane iyle callit Pabay, neyre ane myle in lenthe, full of woodes, guid for fishing, and a main shelter for thieves and cut-throats. It perteins to M’Kynnoun". Of the island of Mull, Monro stated that, "this iyle pertains pairtly to M’Gillayne of Doward, pairtly to M’Gillayne of Lochbowy, pairtly to M’Kynnoun, and pairtly to the Clandonald of awld".

In 1579, Fynnoun MacKynnoun of Strathardill, and his son Lachlane Oig, were reported to James VI, along with Maclaine of Lochbuie and the MacLeans, by John, Bishop of the Isles. The Bishop of the Isles complained to the Scots king that these men were preventing him from receiving the rents of his See. According to MacLean family tradition, sometime after the battle of Lochgruinard in 1598, the MacLeans led by Hector MacLean invaded the MacDonald island of Islay, accompanied with MacLeod of Dunvegan, the Cameron of Lochiel, Mackinnon, and MacNiel of Barra, with their followers. MacLean and his men engaged the MacDonalds "at a place called Bern Bige, attacked and defeated them, and afterwards ravaged the whole island in revenge for the slaughter of the Macleans at Lochgruinart".

On 12 July 1606 Lauchlan MacKinnon of Strathairdle and Finlay Macnab of Bowaine, entered into a Bond of Friendship and Manrent. In the bond the two chiefs claimed to "come from ane house and one lineage", and promised to lend aid to each other. The chief of Clan MacKinnon signed his name, Lauchland, mise Mac Fingon. This bond was seen as further proof, by Skene, that the Mackinnons were descended from Siol Alpin. Another bond of manrent, this time between the MacKinnons and MacGregors, has also been seen as proof of a Siol Alpin descent. On 1671, in Kilmorie, Lauchlan MacKinnon of Strahairdle and James Macgregor of Macgregor, entered into the bond, stating that the two chiefs descended "fra twa breethren of auld descent". In 1609, the chief of the clan, Lauchlane McKynnoun of that Ilk, was one of the highland chiefs and leading men who witnessed the statutes known as the Statutes of Iona, which were enacted to bring the Western Isles under the control of the Scottish Government.

An indication of the relative extent of the estates of the three great chiefs of Skye at the end of the 17th century is afforded by the amount of rental for each: £7,000 for Macleod, £6,200 for Macdonald and £2,400 for Mackinnon (at a time when 12 Scottish pounds were approximately equivalent to one English pound sterling).

=== Civil War ===
During the Wars of the Three Kingdoms the MacKinnons followed the Marquess of Montrose, and took part in the Battle of Inverlochy on 2 February 1645. The chief of Clan MacKinnon, Lauchlan MacKinnon, raised a regiment in aid of Charles II, and was present at the Battle of Worcester. It is said that he was made a Knight Banneret at this battle, though this is thought improbable as such a custom was by then very much obsolete. (A knight banneret was created by a sovereign on the field of battle and could lead vassals under his own banner).

=== Jacobite uprisings ===
Although considered a relatively minor clan, it seems to have been of considerable strength. Clan MacKinnon took part in the Jacobite risings, supporting the Stuarts, in the 18th century. In 1715, 150 MacKinnons fought with the Macdonalds of Sleat, at the Battle of Sherrifmuir. Because of this the chief of the clan was forfeited, though he eventually received a pardon on 4 January 1727. In the rebellion of 1745, the chief, then old and infirm, joined the forces of Charles Edward Stuart (Bonnie Prince Charlie) with a battalion of men. Lord President Duncan Forbes estimated that the MacKinnon force of that time was about 200 men. "Mackinnons – The Laird of MacKinnon is their Chief, who in Irish is called Mackenoin holds his Lands of the Crown both in the Isles of Skye and Mull and Can raise 200 Men." Following the defeat of the Jacobites at the Battle of Culloden, Charles Edward Stuart fled to the west coast of Scotland in order to flee to France. Tradition has the MacKinnons aiding the prince, with the chief concealing him in a cave, and the chief's wife bringing the prince refreshments of cold meat and wine.

The MacKinnon chief was later captured by Government troops and spent a year in confinement before being put on trial, with his life at stake, in Tilbury Fort. MacKinnon was eventually spared his life and pardoned because of his advanced age. It is said, though, that upon leaving the courtroom the Attorney General, Sir Dudley Ryder, asked Mackinnon, "If King George were in your power, as you have been in his, what would you do?" MacKinnon replied, "I would do to him, as he has this day done to me; I would send him back to his own country". Because of the chief's support of the Jacobite rebellion they lost Strathardle in 1765, and have since been held landless in their ancient clan lands.

=== Modern history ===
The last chief of the senior line died unmarried in 1808; he was the great-grandson of John, elder son of Lachlan Mor who fought at the Battle of Worcester. The chiefship then passed to a representative of Lachlan Mor's second son, Donald. This Donald had apparently been taken prisoner at the Battle of Worcester and later traveled to the West Indies. It was his great-great-grandson, William Alexander MacKinnon, who became thirty-third chief in 1808. A later attempt by the MacKinnons of Corriechatachan (a cadet branch) to claim the chiefship generated a great deal of controversy and a certain amount of local support in Skye, but proved ultimately fruitless. The thirty-fifth chief of the clan was Francis Alexander MacKinnon. Today the current chief is Madam Anne Gunhild MacKinnon of MacKinnon, 38th Chief of the Name and Arms of MacKinnon, recognized by the Lord Lyon. She has two sons who are eligible upon her death to become chief under the blood line and providing they retain the MacKinnon name. In 2015 Madame Anne MacKinnon appointed Stephen MacKinnon of Massachusetts, U.S.A. as her representative of the Chief and is recognized as such by the Clan MacKinnon Society. She also appointed Stephen MacKinnon Chieftain of Mishnish.

== Chief ==
The current chieftess of Clan Mackinnon is Madame Anne Gunhild MacKinnon of MacKinnon, 38th Chief of the Name and Arms of MacKinnon. The Antigua Chief of Mackinnon Madame Anne Gunheild MacKinnon of MacKinnon, 38th Chief is recognized by the Lord Lyon. While her outside contacts with Clan MacKinnon have been limited, the Clan MacKinnon Society made contact with her and she appointed in 2015 a Representative of the Chief, Stephen MacKinnon of Massachusetts, U.S.A. Stephen was also appointed at this time, Chieftain of Mishnish. Anne MacKinnon has never given up her position and in fact, has two sons who are eligible to inherit her title under the blood line and providing they retain the MacKinnon name.

== Tartans ==
Tartan image	Notes
	Clan Mackinnon tartan as published in the Vestiarium Scoticum in 1842. Today there are many different tartans attributed to the Mackinnons.
	Mackinnon Hunting tartan. This modern tartan was registered with Lyon Court in 1960, and is based upon the Mackinnon tartan found in the dubious Vestiarium Scoticum.
	The MacKinnon Hunting Modern tartan was registered with Lyon Court in 1960 with a letter from 'The Mackinnon of Mackinnon', advising 'the correct setts for the Clan and Hunting Tartans of the Clan Mackinnon.' (STA ref: 1641).

== See also ==
- Siol Alpin
- Scottish clan

== Bibliography ==
- The Scottish Clans and Their Tartans, With Notes, Library Edition. W. & A. K. Johnston, Ltd.
- Allardyce, James (ed). Historical Papers Relating to the Jacobite Period, 1699–1750. Aberdeen, 1895–96.
- Anderson, William. The Scottish Nation. vol 3. Edinburgh & London: A. Fullarton & Co., 1863.
- Downie, Sir Alexander Mackenzie and Mackinnon, Alister Downie. Genealogical Account of the Family of Mackinnon, compiled many years ago from authentic records. 2nd edition, Edward Stanford, London, 1883.
- Eyre-Todd, George (1923). The Highland Clans of Scotland: Their History and Traditions. Vol. 2. Heath, Cranton / Appleton. pp. 116–123 ("328–333").
- Gregory, Donald. History of the Western Highlands And Isles of Scotland, From A.D. 1493 To A.D. 1625. Edinburgh: William Tait, 1836.
- Mackinnon, Charles. Scottish Highlanders. Barnes & Noble Publishing, 1995. ISBN 0-88029-950-9.
- Maclauchlan, Thomas & Wilson, John & Keltie, John Scott. A History of the Scottish Highlands, Highland Clans and Highland Regiments. Edinburgh and London: A. Fullarton & Co., 1875.
- Moncreiffe of that Ilk, Sir Iain. The Highland Clans. London: Barrie & Rockliff, 1967.
- The Iona Club (ed). Collectanea de Rebus Albanicis. Edinburgh: Thomas G. Stevenson, 1847.
- J. Romilly Allen. "The Early Christian Monuments of Iona". Proceedings of the Society of Antiquaries of Scotland. vol. 35, pp. 79–93. 1900–01.
- Skene, William Forbes. The Highlanders of Scotland, Their Origin, History, And Antiquities. London: John Murray, 1837.
- Smibert, Thomas. The Clans of the Highlands of Scotland. Edinburgh: James Hogg. 1850.
