= John Muir Country Park =

Country park in East Lothian, Scotland

Coordinates: 56.006°N 2.568°W

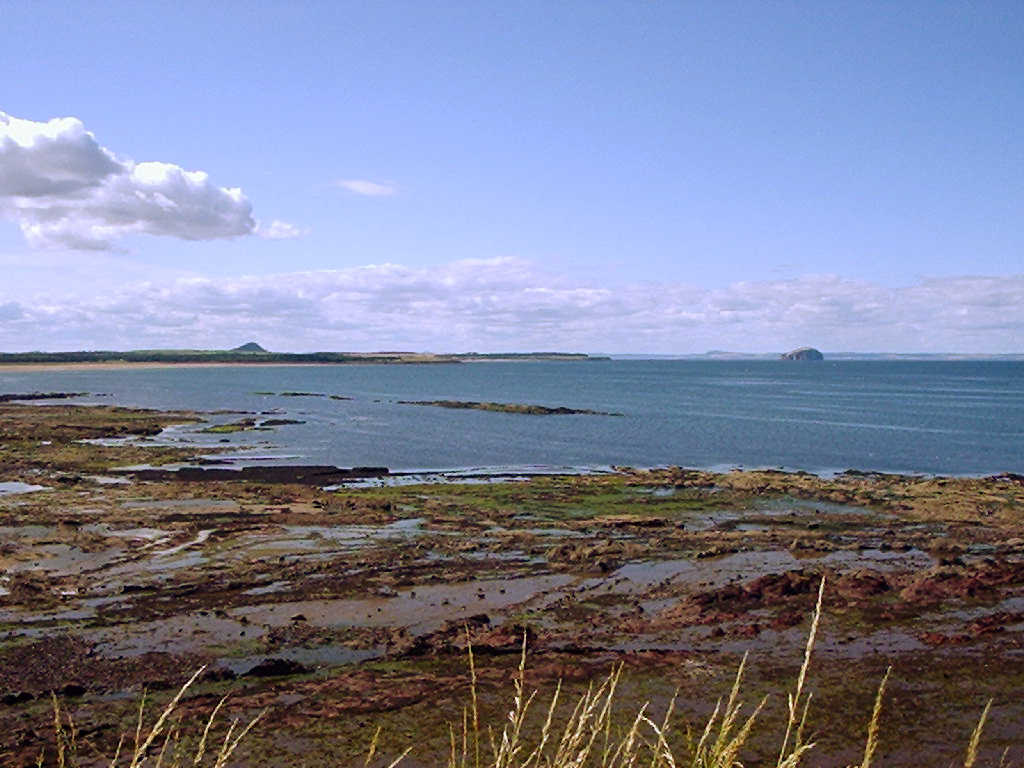
View from Dunbar cliff-top trail looking north-west towards John Muir Country Park. North Berwick Law and the Bass Rock are visible.

The John Muir Country Park is a country park near the village of West Barns, which is part of the town of Dunbar in East Lothian, Scotland. It is named after John Muir, a famous naturalist and geologist who was born in Dunbar and later emigrated to the United States, where he developed his ideas.

Designated on 12 October 1976, the park covers an area of seven hundred and thirteen point five hectares (1,763 acres), stretching along 13 kilometres (8 mi) of coastline from Pfeffer Sands to Dunbar Castle. The area forms part of the Firth of Forth Ramsar Site, the Firth of Forth (including the John Muir Country Park) is also a Site of Special Scientific Interest (SSSI) and a Special Protection Area (SPA). Separately, the coastline from Dunbar Castle to Winterfield is designated as an SSSI for its geological, biological and geomorphological interest.

== Wildlife ==
The park has a mixture of mainly semi-natural habitats from woodland through grasslands and saltmarsh to coastal dunes and rocky and sandy shorelines.

=== Flora ===
John Muir Country Park has approximately 400 species of plant recorded within its boundaries. Notable species include thrift (Armeria maritima) and sea aster (Tripolium pannonicum) which are common on the saltmarsh; sea rocket (Cakile maritima) and biting stonecrop (Sedum acre) which are members of the plant community on the upper beach. In the dunes common species include marram grass (Ammophila arenaria) and birds-foot trefoil (Lotus corniculatus), while along the woodland edges common wildflowers include meadow cranesbill (Geranium pratense) and viper's bugloss (Echium vulgare).

=== Birds ===
The birdlife of the area includes a variety of wildfowl, waders, gulls and terns including whooper swan, common greenshank, Eurasian whimbrel and little tern as residents and migrants. The woodlands and grasslands are home to common crossbill, green woodpecker, Eurasian jay, European stonechat and Eurasian skylark. A number of rare species have been recorded in the park including American black duck, green heron, greater sandplover and semipalmated sandpiper. There is some wildfowling on the site.

=== Other wildlife ===
Two of the commonest butterflies seen in the park are the meadow brown and the common blue while the day-flying cinnabar moth and six-spot burnet moth are commonly seen.

== History and archaeology ==
Within the boundaries of John Muir Country Park there are a total of 52 sites of archaeological and historical interest, including ruins, buildings, monuments, wartime defences and shipwrecks.

=== Dunbar Castle ===
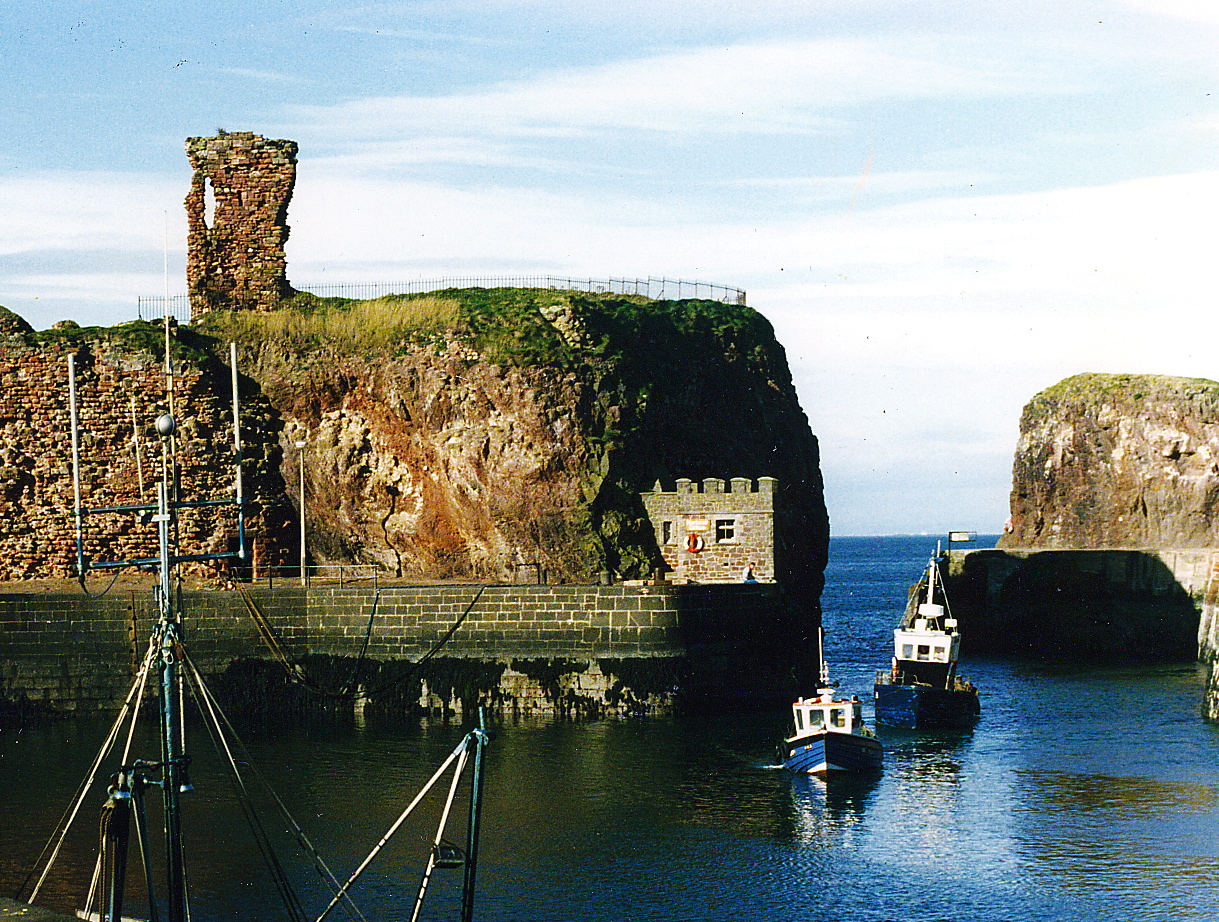
Ruins of Dunbar Castle next to the harbour

The ruins of Dunbar Castle are also within the park. Dunbar Castle was once one of the most important strategic buildings in Scotland and was the subject of many battles as Picts, Angles and others battled for control of the castle and surrounding area. Long after the advent of peace between Scotland and England, the remains of the castle were in the news again in 1842 when electrically fired demolition charges saw their first practical use - blasting a channel through the rock to serve as the entrance for the new Victoria Harbour. The castle has been allowed to disintegrate under the impact of wave and weather since 1567; major losses were sustained in 1868 and 1993 (collapses of walls), but minor losses occur annually. The remains are currently inaccessible to the public.

== See also ==
- John Muir's Birthplace
- John Muir Way
- John Muir Trust
