= List of Officer Cadet Training Units =

This is a list of Officer Cadet Training Units, or OCTUs, which were British military establishments for training future commissioned officers of the British Army, the British Indian Army, and the Royal Air Force, to complement the limited capacity at the traditional military academies such as the Royal Military College, Sandhurst.

== British Army ==
- 102 (Westminster Dragoons) Officer Cadet Training Unit (TA), was at Westminster
- 121 Officer Cadet Training Unit RA, was established at Aldershot and in 1941 moved to Alton Towers, Staffordshire and trained Royal Artillery
- 122 Officer Cadet Training Unit RA trained Royal Artillery officers at Larkhill, Wiltshire.
- 123 Officer Cadet Training Unit was at Catterick Garrison, Yorkshire
- 133 (AA) Officer Cadet Training Unit was at Shrivenham during the Second World War and trained cadets in Anti-Aircraft work
- 148 Pre-Officer Cadet Training Unit Training Establishment was created in 1942 at Wrotham Park, Hertfordshire, to standardize the first stage of cadet training; cadets went there for initial training and then proceeded to a specialist OCTU.
- 161 Infantry Officer Cadet Training Unit (RMC), established in 1939, later became the Mons Officer Cadet Training Unit (Aldershot), which in 1960 was merged into the Mons Officer Cadet School.
- 162 Officer Cadet Training Unit was formed in 1939 from the Infantry Battalion of the Honourable Artillery Company; this was the Officer Training Unit of the Reconnaissance Corps. In 1942, 101 RAC OCTU amalgamated with 162 Reconnaissance Corps OCTU to form 100 RAC OCTU based at the Royal Military College, Sandhurst.
- 163 Officer Cadet Training Unit was formed during the Second World War from the Artists Rifles
- 164 Officer Cadet Training Unit was formed in September 1940 at Barmouth, Merionethshire
- 165 Officer Cadet Training Unit existed during the Second World War at Lauderdale House, Dunbar.
- 166 Officer Cadet Training Unit was at Colchester from 1939 and later at Douglas, Isle of Man, where it was lent to the Royal Air Force to train officers of the RAF Regiment.
- 168 Officer Cadet Training Unit was at Aldershot
- The Royal Armoured Corps Officer Cadet Training Unit was at the Royal Military College, Sandhurst, from 1944 to 1945
- The Eaton Hall Officer Cadet Training Unit was at Eaton Hall, Cheshire, from 1946 until 1960, when it was also merged into the Mons Officer Cadet School.

== British Indian Army ==
- An Officer Cadet Training Unit was at Bangalore.

== Royal Air Force ==
- No. 1 Officer Cadet Training Unit was based at RAF Millom and later at RAF Jurby and RAF Feltwell
- No. 2 Officer Cadet Training Unit was at RAF Kirton in Lindsey
- The RAF Officer Cadet Training Unit, at RAF Henlow from 1965 to 1980, then merged with the Royal Air Force College Cranwell
- Another Officer Cadet Training Unit was at RAF Spitalgate
- A Women's Royal Air Force Officer Cadet Training Unit was at RAF Henlow.
- A Home Command Modified Officer Cadet Training Unit was part of the RAF Home Command
- 166 Officer Cadet Training Unit (see under British Army)
