= Dunbar Town F.C. =

Former association football club in Scotland

Dunbar Town
- Full name: Dunbar Town Football Club
- Founded: 1936
- Dissolved: 1939
- Ground: Laundry Park
- Player-manager: James Sked
Home colours

Dunbar Town F.C. was a short-lived senior association football club from Dunbar in East Lothian.

== History ==
The club played under the purview of the Berwickshire Association in its first season, but withdrew before the season's end, in order to join the East of Scotland League in 1937. The club's first match in the competition was a disastrous 11–2 defeat to Peebles Rovers. The Town however quickly recovered, and finished the season mid-table, although helped by a number of teams not completing the season.

The 1938–39 League season saw the club win more matches than it lost, finishing in the upper mid-table. However it had less success in Cup competitions; it lost in the preliminary round of the East of Scotland Qualifying Cup in both 1937–38 and 1938–39, the former after a replay against reigning East of Scotland League champions Jed Arts; the club's draw in the original game was considered a major shock, as Dunbar arrived with only seven players, and relied on a reserve plus three local volunteers to make up the numbers. It also lost in the first round of the King Cup in the same seasons.

The club joined the Scottish Football Association in August 1938, in time to enter the 1938–39 Scottish Qualifying Cup, and beat Coldstream 4–3 in the first round, nearly throwing away a four-goal lead. In the second, Town lost 3–1 at Berwick Rangers, a result which put the Wee Gers into the first round proper; the match came three weeks after Rangers had beaten Town in the East of Scotland Cup.

The club had always struggled to attract crowds, and having gone into abeyance for the Second World War, did not re-emerge after it. The club's last game had been the first of the aborted 1939–40 East of Scotland League season - a 2–1 defeat at Bo'ness after conceding a late penalty.

== Colours ==
The club wore red and white jerseys.

== Ground ==
The club played at Laundry Park, on Spott Road.

== Notable player ==
James Sked, the club's coach and left-half, had been a reserve player at Heart of Midlothian, and had played for Peebles Rovers and Penicuik Athletic.
