= West Barns =

Coordinates: 55.994°N 2.553°W

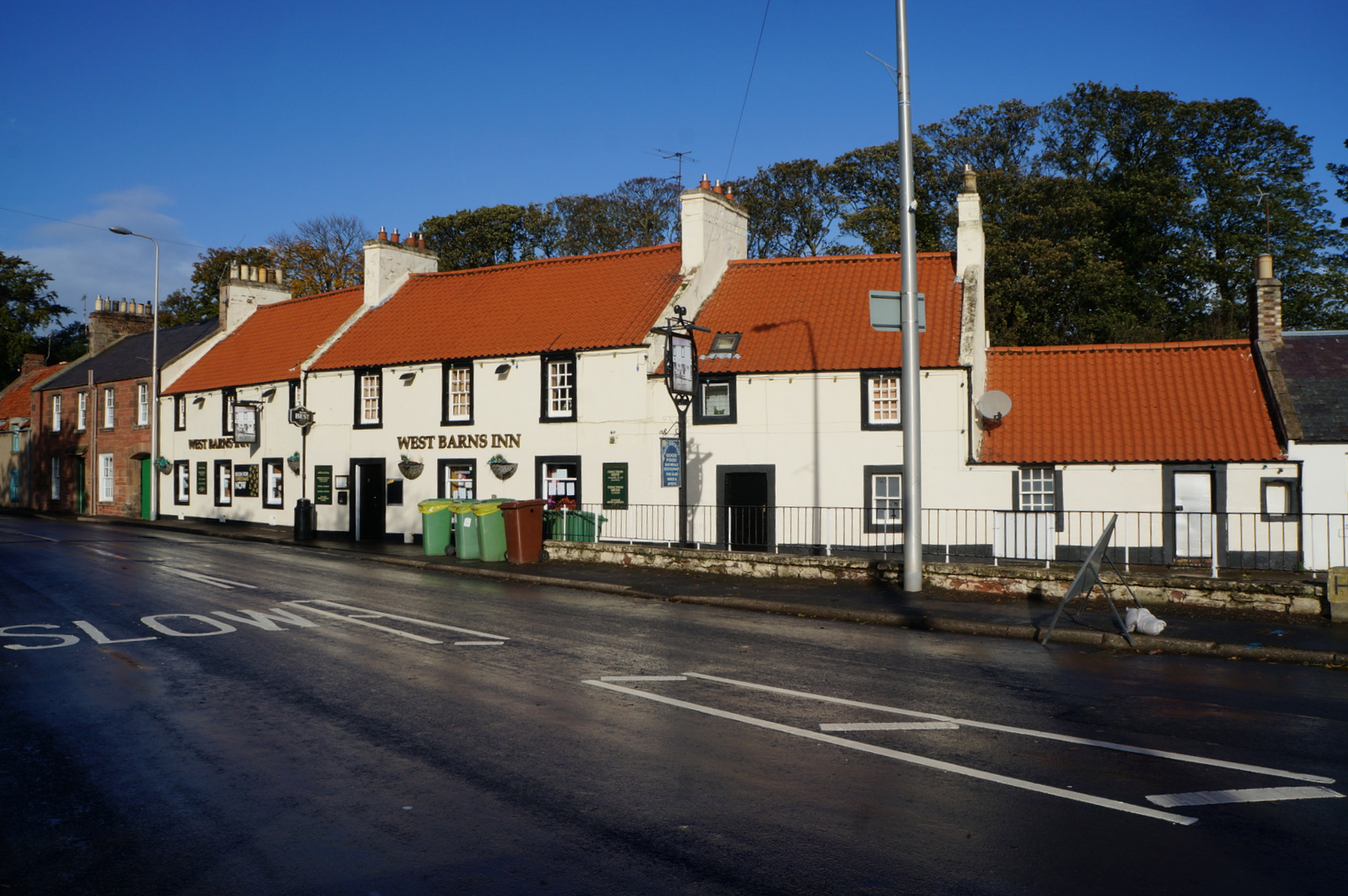
- West Barns Inn

- Location within East Lothian
- Population: 630 (2020)
- OS grid reference: NT655779
- Civil parish: Dunbar
- Council area: East Lothian
- Lieutenancy area: East Lothian
- Country: Scotland
- Sovereign state: United Kingdom
- Post town: DUNBAR
- Postcode district: EH42
- Dialling code: 01368
- Police: Scotland
- Fire: Scottish
- Ambulance: Scottish
- UK Parliament: East Lothian
- Scottish Parliament: East Lothian

West Barns is a small village in East Lothian, Scotland. It lies 2 miles west of Dunbar and approximately 28 miles east of Edinburgh. It is close to John Muir Country Park and Belhaven Bay. For many years, it was home to the West Barns Inn and is still home to the West Barns Bowling Club. It was home to a major John Deere farm machinery dealership, that moved to Haddington in 2017, the site being taken over by the Thistly Cross Cider Company. There is also a local amateur football team, West Barns Star. Children of primary-school age attend West Barns Primary, after which they will go to Dunbar Grammar School.

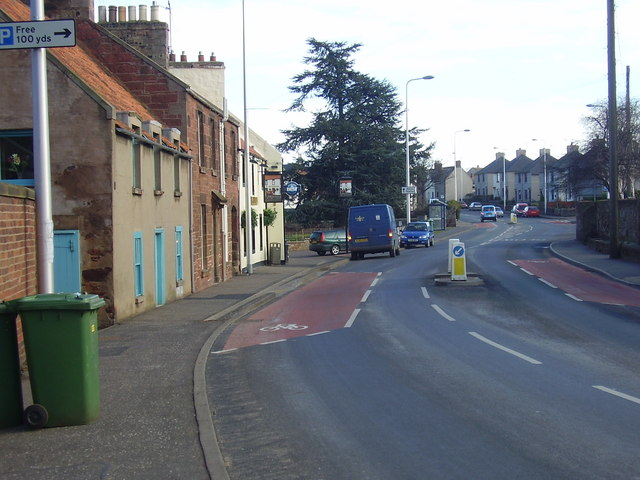
Road through West Barns
