= John Muir's Birthplace =

Museum in Dunbar, East Lothian, Scotland

Coordinates: 56.002896°N 2.516871°W

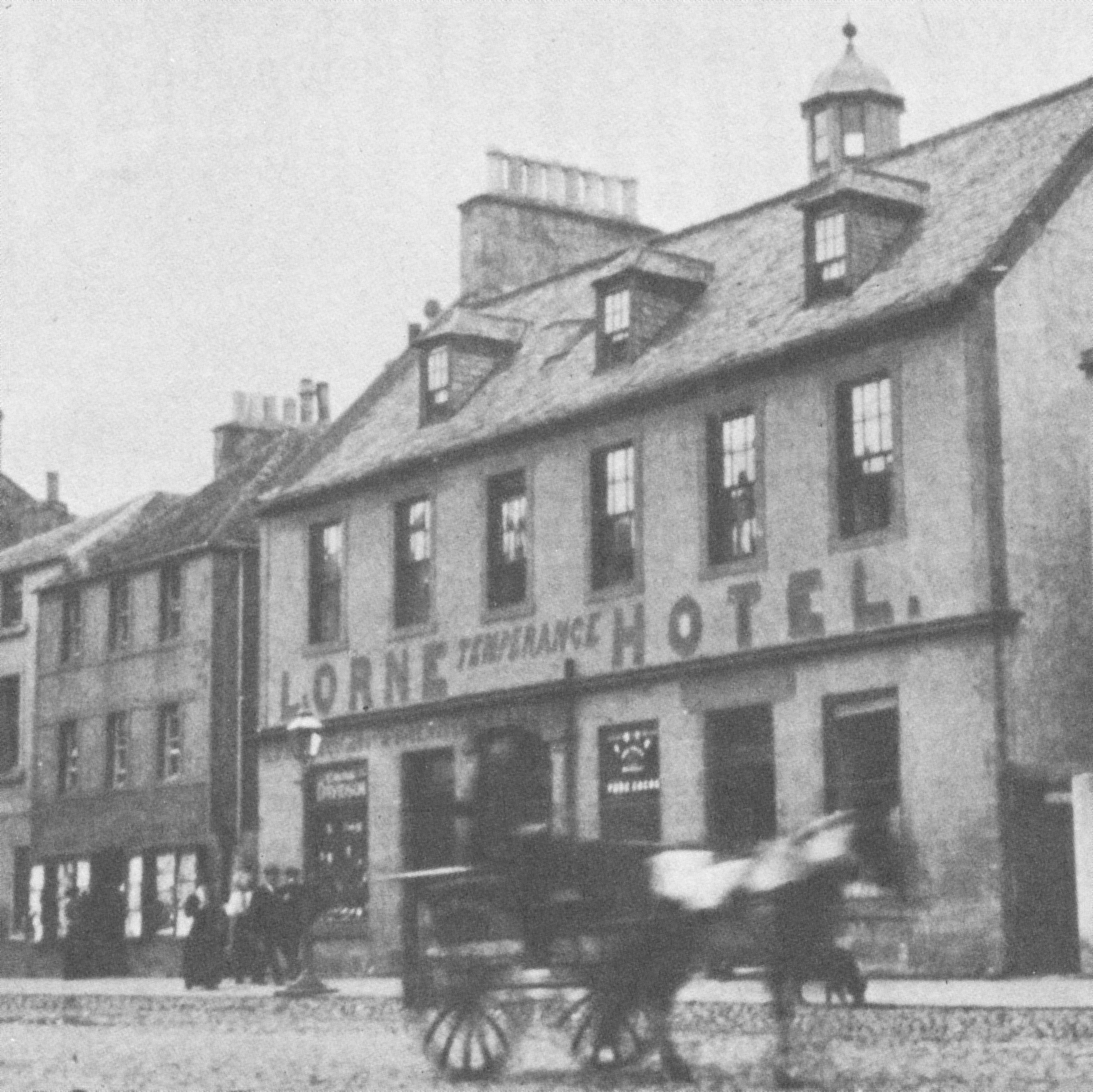
John Muir was born in the smaller house to the left. In 1842, his father purchased the larger building to the right, and made it the family home.

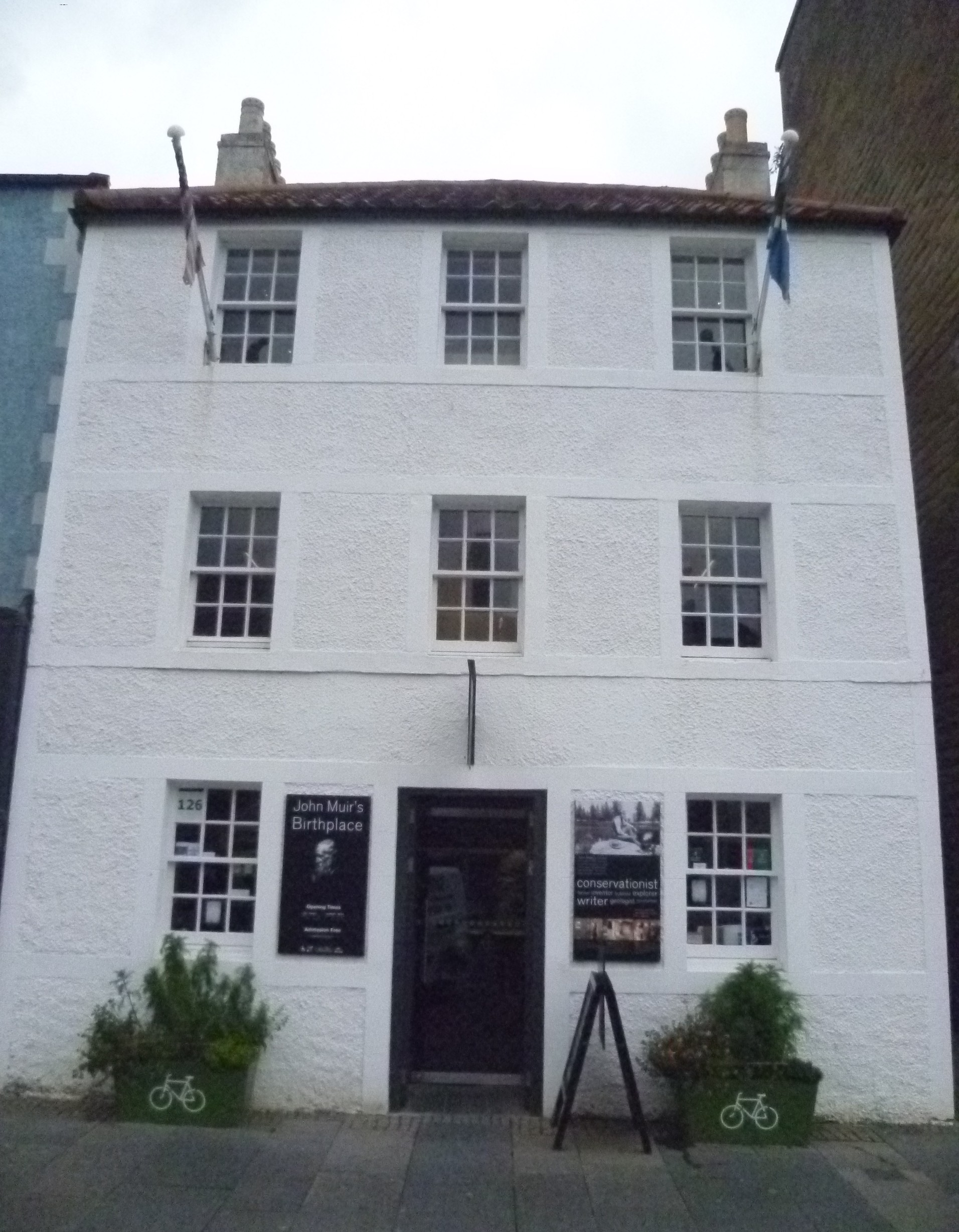
Muir's birthplace is now a museum dedicated to his life and work

John Muir's Birthplace, in Dunbar, East Lothian, Scotland, is a museum run by East Lothian Council Museums Service as a centre for study and interpretation of the work of the Scottish-American conservationist John Muir.

== History ==
John Muir, the naturalist and preservationist, was born in the house at 126 High Street on 21 April 1838, the third child of Daniel Muir and his second wife Ann Gilrye Muir. The house is described as a "three storey stone building" in "the best business district of the town." His father operated a successful grain and food store in the building as well, a business which he had inherited when his first wife died.

The family emigrated to the United States in 1849, and Muir revisited Dunbar only once thereafter (in 1893), but kept in contact with relatives until his death in 1914. His connections with Dunbar were forgotten until the 1960s, when American enthusiasts began to turn up in Dunbar seeking information about their hero's roots. A small museum was created in the upper flat of the redeveloped and restored building under a private/public partnership in 1980, opening the following year. The museum has come under the ambit of a number of organisations. It was originally proposed to operate with a team of volunteer attendants, but operational matters were shortly assumed by East Lothian Tourist Board and continued until 1996. It then became the responsibility of East Lothian Council Museums Service, who now operate it for the present owner, the John Muir Birthplace Trust. The trust is a Scottish charity, formed in 1998 as a collaboration between East Lothian Council, the John Muir Trust, Dunbar's John Muir Association (relaunched in 2008 as the Friends of John Muir's Birthplace), and Dunbar Community Council, to preserve John Muir's birthplace and to turn it into a centre for study and interpretation of his work. The project started in 2002, and the centre opened to the public in August 2003. On 8 February 2012, the arrival of the 100,000th visitor was marked by a special presentation.

== Remembering John Muir ==
The John Muir Trust is a charity which aims to protect wild land and wildlife and administers the John Muir Award scheme.

The John Muir Way is a long distance footpath from Helensburgh to Dunbar. There is an older known footpath named John Muir Way from Musselburgh to Dunglass through East Lothian

The John Muir Country Park is situated in the Dunbar area.

In Martinez, California, United States is the John Muir National Historic Site, consisting mainly of John Muir's home, plus a portion of his orchards. There is also the John Muir Memorial site not far from the Historic Site that is composed of a statue of John Muir on a rock surrounded by trees.

John Muir Day is celebrated every year on 21 April in California.

John Muir College at University of California - San Diego.
