= John Muir Trust =

Scottish charity

- Formation: 1983
- Type: Scottish charitable company limited by guarantee
- Headquarters: Pitlochry
- Website: John Muir Trust website

The John Muir Trust (JMT) is a Scottish charity, established in 1983 to conserve wild land and wild places for the benefit of all. The Trust runs an environmental award scheme, manages several estates, mainly in the Highlands and Islands of Scotland and campaigns for better protection of wild land.

== Activities ==
The John Muir Trust was founded in 1983 by Denis Mollison, Nicholas Luard, Nigel Hawkins and Chris Brasher. The organisation was inspired by the work of Scottish-born conservationist John Muir – a key figure in the modern conservation movement, particularly in the USA where he worked to save Yosemite National Park and other areas of wilderness. Building on Muir's reputation there, the Trust has links with the Sierra Club, which John Muir founded in California in 1892.

The Trust is a membership organisation. It currently has less than 10,000 members (31/12/2024), a decrease of over 10% since December 2017. It works to raise awareness of the benefits of wild land and campaigns for better protection of wild land, challenging inappropriate developments when these threaten an area. In 2014, the Scottish Government adopted the Wild Land Areas map into planning policy.

In February 1997, Environment Minister Lord Lindsay launched a new environmental award scheme, the John Muir Award, which has grown steadily over 21 years.

=== John Muir's birthplace ===
In 1998, together with East Lothian Council, Dunbar's John Muir Association and Dunbar Community Council, the Trust formed a new organisation called the John Muir Birthplace Trust. The following year JMBT purchased John Muir's Birthplace at 126 High Street, Dunbar. They have turned it into a centre which tells the story of John Muir's early years in Dunbar where he established his passion for wild places and creatures.

In 2013, the Trust opened the Wild Space visitor centre below its existing offices in the centre of Pitlochry. As at 2024, the Wild Space is yet to make a profit, although it operates primarily as a public engagement forum. However, it does not appear to have generated any significant increase in membership.

== Land management ==
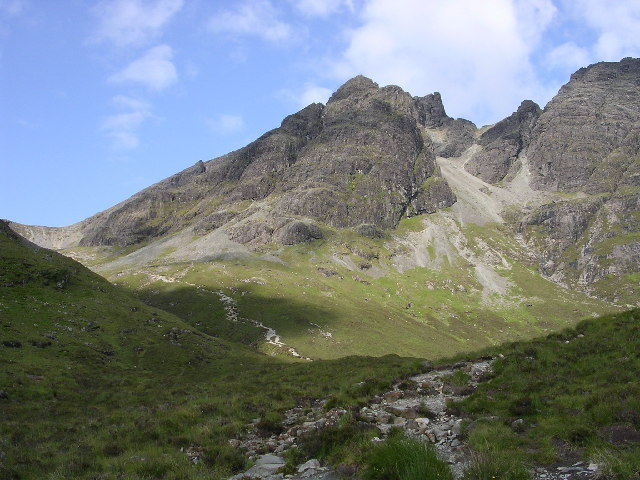
Blà Bheinn

The John Muir Trust owns and manages some of the finest wild land in the highlands and islands of Scotland. As well as protecting landscapes, the Trust works to restore natural habitats and encourage native species. It works with local people and communities, and seeks to increase awareness and understanding of wild places.

In Perthshire, the Trust restored and realigned the main footpath to the summit of Schiehallion. The Trust has carried out major restoration work on the Steall Gorge footpath in Glen Nevis, Sandwood Bay in Sutherland, Blà Bheinn and Druim Hain on Skye and Suilven in Assynt. In a number of locations it works to protect and restore ancient woodland and native woodlands.

In early 2023, the Trust purchased a set of holiday cabins at Kylesku, Sutherland, which sit alongside the North Coast 500 tourist route. On 12/09/2025, they acquired Kylesku Estate from Jim Sloane, a former trustee. "Consideration" for the property (amount paid) is noted on the title deed as "implementation of missives". As a result, the Trust now owns land stretching from the summit of Quinag to Loch Assynt and their long-term intention is to create a worldclass visitor hub at Kylesku.

=== List of properties ===
- The south side and summit of Ben Nevis, the highest mountain in the British Isles
- Glenlude near Traquair in the Scottish Borders
- Li & Coire Dhorrcail on the north coast of the Knoydart peninsula
- Quinag, the three peak mountain in Assynt, Kylesku Estate and Kylesku holiday chalets
- Sandwood Bay in north west Sutherland
- East Schiehallion in Highland Perthshire, which includes the summit and the main footpath
- Strathaird, Torrin and Sconser, Skye which include the Red Cuillin and part of the Black Cuillin

=== Working in partnership ===
As owner of the Ben Nevis Estate, JMT plays a key role in the Nevis Partnership, which covers care of the Ben itself and the wider Nevis area including Glen Nevis and the Allt a' Mhuilinn leading to the North Face. The Trust helped establish the Knoydart Foundation, which purchased the 17,000-acre (69 km^{2}) Knoydart Estate in 1999. The purchase brought the "rough bounds" into community and conservation ownership. The Trust is the only external representative on the North Harris Trust, which aims to manage, develop and conserve the North Harris Estate (Outer Hebrides) in a sustainable manner. In 2005, JMT purchased the Quinag Estate in Sutherland and joined the Assynt Foundation (Lochinver) to assist them in purchasing and managing the neighbouring Glencanisp and Drumrunie Estates.

The Trust has given support to the Carrifran Wildwood project, initiated by the Borders Forest Trust. The Wildwood group purchased land in the Carrifran valley in the Moffat Hills of Southern Scotland in 1999 and has started to recreate a large tract of woodland wilderness that will be used as an educational resource.

It also supported the Langholm community in its buyout of 5300 acres of land in the Scottish Borders.

At the end of 2017, JMT signed a lease to manage Glenridding Common in the Lake District, which includes most of Helvellyn (England's third highest peak), Striding Edge and Red Tarn. The lease ended in 2023. In 2020, the Trust entered the Thirlmere Resilience Partnership, a partnership with United Utilities, Natural England and Cumbria Wildlife Trust, to manage land around Thirlmere reservoir, near Helvellyn, to create a resilient water catchment to supply the water needed by people, while providing a home for native biodiversity. The Trust is carrying out survey and monitoring work, with a view to long-term peatland and woodland regeneration and the restoration of natural processes in the area.

== John Muir Award ==
The John Muir Trust established an environmental award scheme in 1997. The John Muir Award encourages people of all backgrounds to enjoy and care for wild places. The award is free, inclusive, non-competitive and flexible. The Trust works with hundreds of partners on the ground throughout the UK to deliver the Award on the ground, including schools, outdoor groups, environmental organisations, and rehabilitation charities. In Scotland it is part of the Curriculum for Excellence and is delivered in all 32 local authority areas.

The John Muir Lifetime Achievement Award is occasionally bestowed on individuals who have demonstrated outstanding work relating to the protection and enjoyment of wild land. Recipients have been:

- 2000 Tom Weir, mountaineer and broadcaster
- 2004 Adam Watson, ecologist, mountaineer and author
- 2006 Doug Scott, mountaineer
- 2008 Irvine Butterfield, writer, photographer and mountain enthusiast
- 2018 Larry Downing, American environmental campaigner

== Ongoing financial and governance problems ==
Since 2022, the organisation has been encountering a series of problems relating to its finances, executive behaviour, deer management, significant staff redundancies, multiple trustee resignations and falling membership. A dossier written by a former member of staff was published on the John Muir Trust in Crisis website in September 2024. As of September 2025, 14 complaints about the charity had been received by OSCR, the Scottish Charity Regulator.

== See also ==
- Glamaig, Isle of Skye
- Ladhar Bheinn, Knoydart
- John Muir Way
