= John Muir Way =

Long-distance route in southern Scotland

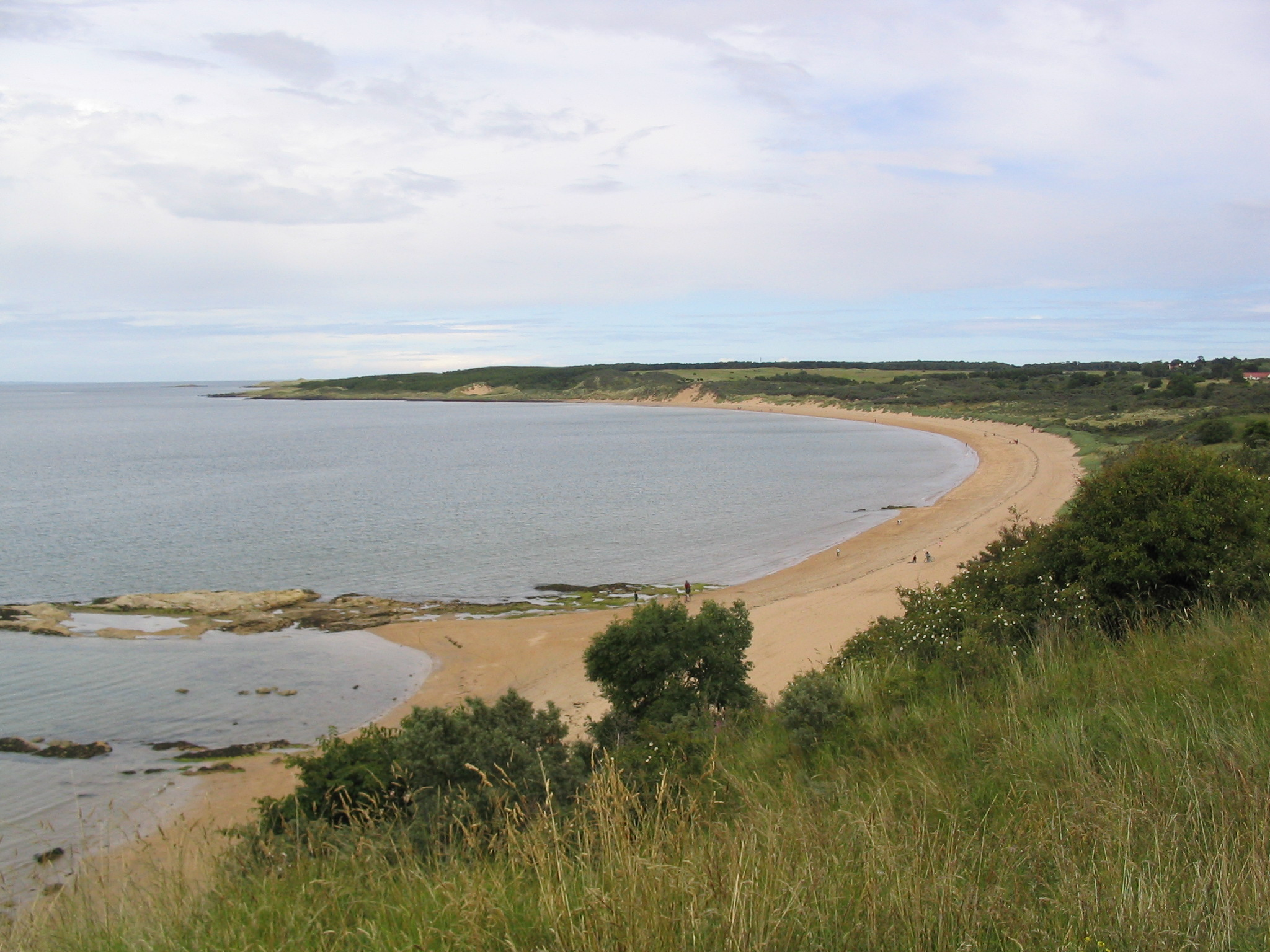
- Gullane beach lies on the trail.
- Length: 215 kilometres (134 mi)
- Location: Argyll and Bute and East Lothian, Scotland
- Designation: Scotland's Great Trails
- Trailheads: Helensburgh Esplanade, Helensburgh, Argyll; 56.0031°N 4.7368°W; Dunbar; 56.0025°N 2.5165°W
- Use: Hiking and cycling
- Elevation gain/loss: 2,015 metres (6,611 ft) gain
- Lowest point: 0 m (0 ft)
- Difficulty: Easy-to-moderate
- Season: All year
- Sights: Castles, canals, beaches, birds, Roman sites, Falkirk Wheel
- Hazards: none
- Website: johnmuirway.org

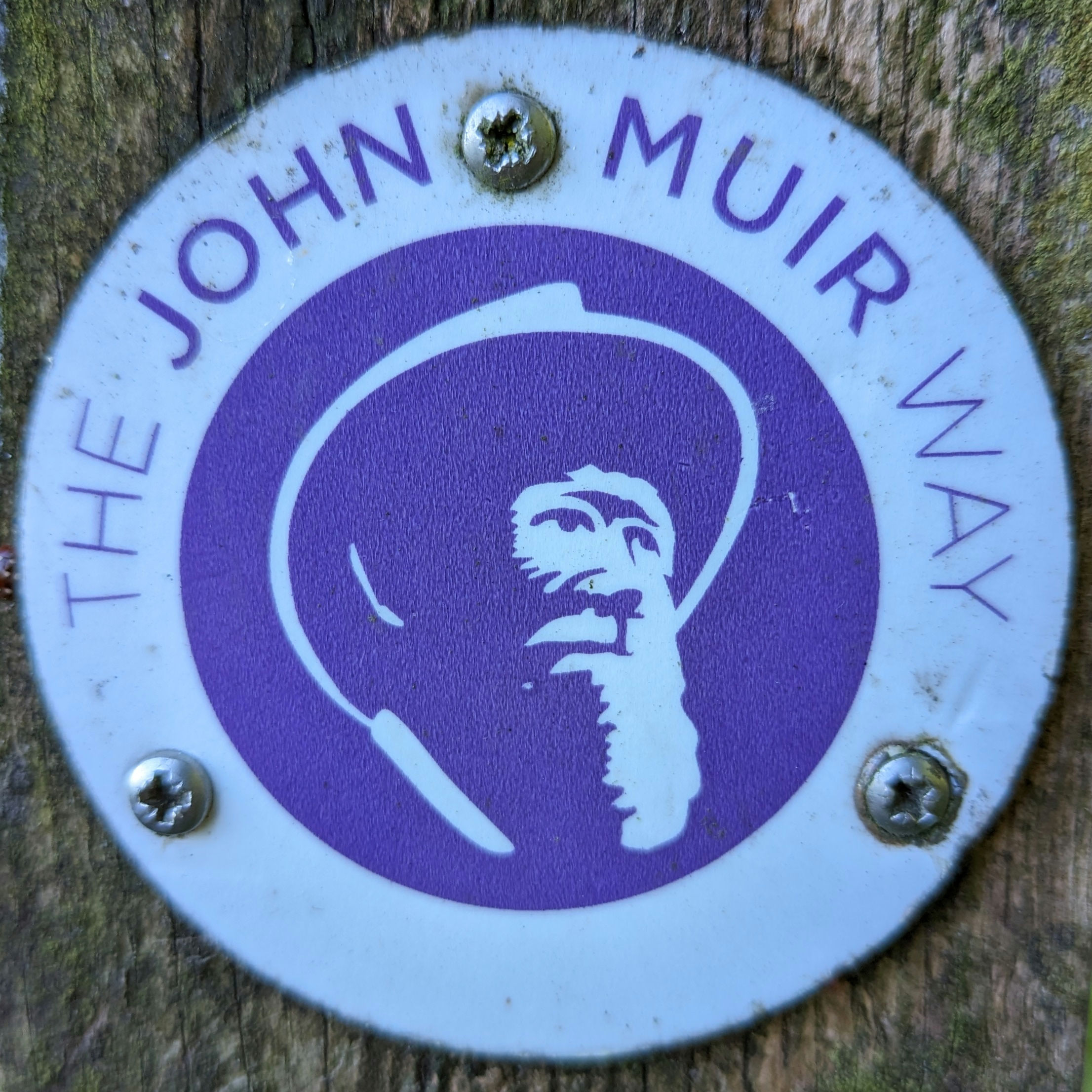
John Muir Way marker near the Falkirk Wheel

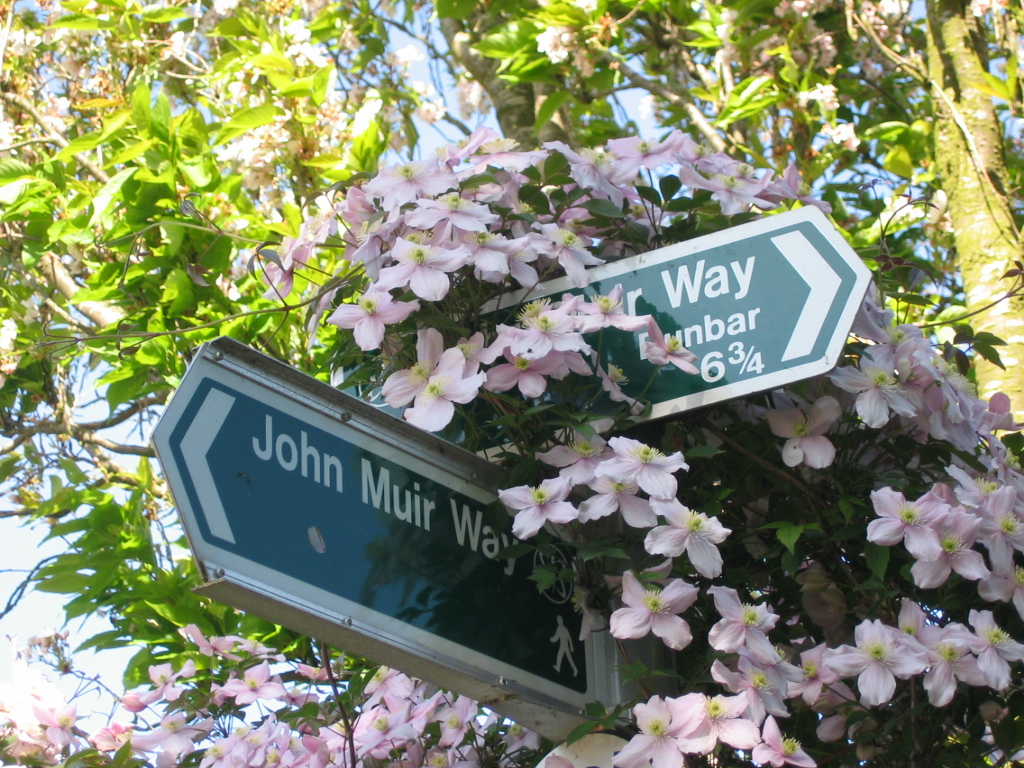
John Muir Way fingerposts

The John Muir Way is a 215-kilometre (130 mi) continuous long-distance route in southern Scotland, running from Helensburgh, Argyll and Bute in the west to Dunbar, East Lothian in the east. It is named in honour of the Scottish conservationist John Muir, who was born in Dunbar in 1838 and became a founder of the United States National Park Service. The route provides a coast-to-coast route across Scotland, linking Muir's birthplace with Scotland's first national park, Loch Lomond and The Trossachs, and Helensburgh, from where he left Scotland for the United States. It is suitable for walkers and cyclists although some sections are on rougher terrain and may not be suitable for road bicycles.

The John Muir Way opened on 21 April 2014. Previously a shorter 'John Muir Way' existed only in East Lothian, but the majority of this older route has now been absorbed into the much longer new route. A shorter section of the older route from Dunbar to the Scottish Borders has been renamed as the 'John Muir Link'. In 2017 the route was designated as one of Scotland's Great Trails by NatureScot. The Independent declared the original John Muir Way its Walk of the Month for February 2014. Between 240,000 and 300,000 people use the path every year, of whom about 5,500 walk the entire route.

== Route ==
The John Muir Way is signposted throughout using a purple-brown logo. Taking the trail from west to east, the John Muir Way starts in Helensburgh. The trail follows over the hills, providing views of Loch Lomond and the Trossach mountains, before descending into Balloch, with its National Park centre. This is one of the wilder sections of the route with the most rugged terrain: windswept, high moorland with little shelter. From here the route winds its way towards Strathblane and Scotland's most famous long-distance walk, the West Highland Way which it crosses near Dumgoyne hill and Glengoyne Distillery.

At Kirkintilloch, the trail picks up the Forth and Clyde Canal and heads through Strathkelvin to Falkirk and its wheel which provides a link between waterways for travelling craft. Roman forts and the Antonine Wall are the next attractions en route to the ancient town of Linlithgow and its impressive palace of Mary, Queen of Scots. It leaves Linlithgow with its low lying loch for the seashore and the harbour town of Bo'ness, coasting along to Blackness Castle and the bridge town of South Queensferry. The trail follows the greener places in the capital city, Edinburgh, before guiding travellers east, past famous, coastal birding and golf spots via Aberlady and North Berwick. The trail ends in Dunbar, where Muir was born and there is a museum dedicated to him.

== See also ==
- European long-distance paths
- John Muir Trust
- John Muir's Birthplace
- List of long-distance footpaths
- Sierra Club
