= Lauderdale House, Dunbar =

Architectural structure in East Lothian, Scotland

Lauderdale House
- Dunbar
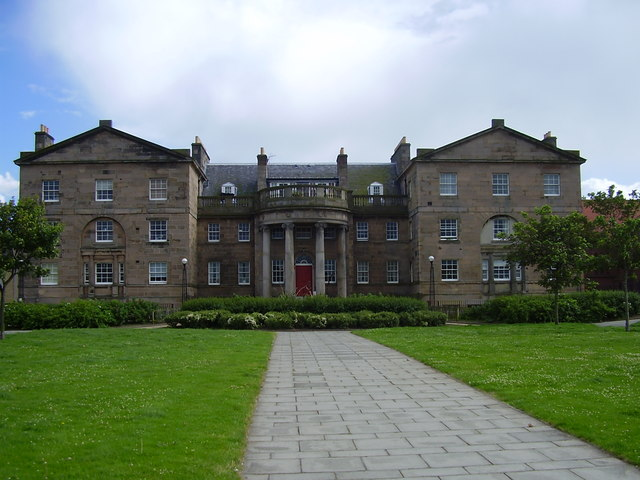
- Lauderdale House

Site information
- Type: Barracks
- Owner: Ministry of Defence
- Operator: British Army

Location
- Location within East Lothian
- Coordinates: 56.00402°N 2.51759°W

Site history
- Built: 1855
- Built for: War Office
- In use: 1855-1955

Lauderdale House, formerly Dunbar House and then Castle Park Barracks, was a private house and then a military installation in Dunbar, Scotland. The building, which is now used as private residential accommodation, is a Category A listed building.

== History ==
=== Early history ===
The central part of the building was originally commissioned by the former member of parliament, James Fall, as "Dunbar House". It was south-facing, built in red brick and was completed in around 1730. After the Fall family got into financial difficulties, James Maitland, 8th Earl of Lauderdale acquired the building in 1788. The earl commissioned Robert Adam to prepare plans to enlarge the building. The building was then enlarged, after Robert Adam's death, to a design by Robert Adam's brother, John Adam, in the neoclassical style with the north frontage being encased in ashlar stone and the work being completed in 1792.

The design involved a new main frontage of thirteen bays facing north with the new end sections of three bays each projected forward as pavilions. The old central section of nine bays was enhanced by the addition of a semi-circular portico formed by four full-height Ionic order columns supporting an entablature and a balustrade. The completed structure then became known as Lauderdale House. A sculpture of a sphinx was placed at roof level on the northern frontage of the building, and a 5 acres (2.0 ha) kitchen garden was established to the west of the house.

=== Castle Park Barracks ===
The barracks have their origins in a hotel known as the New Inn which provided accommodation for officers from 1797. Private soldiers, who were not allowed to use the New Inn, had to use tented accommodation at Belhaven Sands and West Barns Links during the Napoleonic Wars. The War Office acquired both the hotel and Lauderdale House and developed the whole site into barracks in 1855. A two-storey barrack block was built adjacent to the main house in 1911.

During the First World War the barracks served as the 6th cavalry depot providing accommodation for the 1st King's Dragoon Guards, the 5th Dragoon Guards, the 1st Royal Dragoons and the 2nd Dragoons (Royal Scots Greys).

During the Second World War the barracks served as headquarters for the 165th Officer Cadet Training Unit.

=== Conversion into flats ===
The barracks were decommissioned in 1955 and the property sold to East Lothian County Council. Castle Rock Housing Association launched an initiative to convert the building into private flats in December 1991. The conversion work, which led to the creation of 27 private homes, was completed in 1994. The old two-storey barrack block was also demolished at that time.
