= Dunbar =

Town in East Lothian, Scotland

Coordinates: 56.002725°N 2.516901°W

Dunbar: Scottish Gaelic: Dùn Bàrr; Scots: Dunbaur
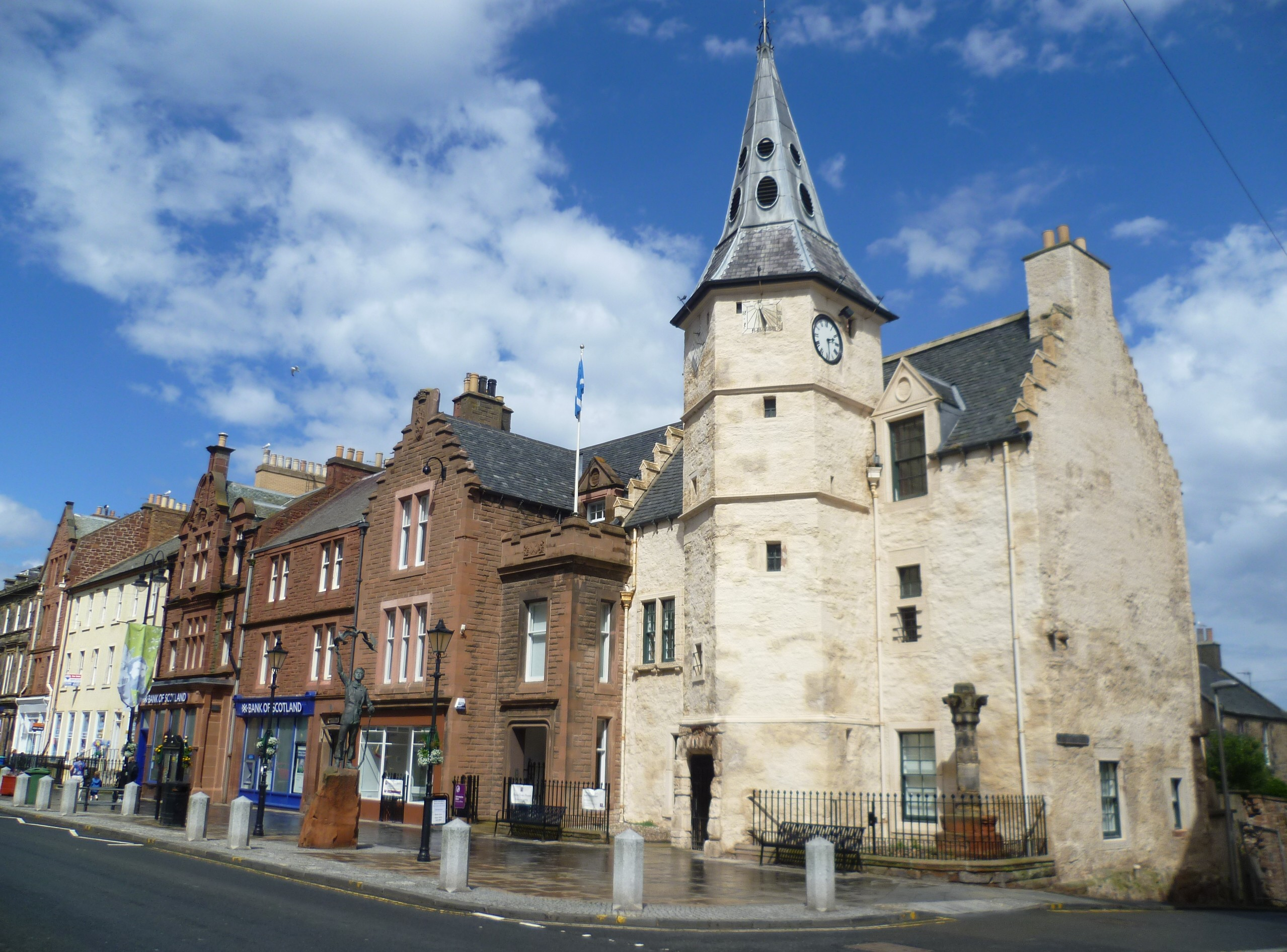
- Dunbar Town House and mercat cross, High Street

- Location within Scotland
- Area: 3.01 km^{2} (1.16 sq mi)
- Population: 10,777 (2022)
  - Density: 3,580/km^{2} (9,300/sq mi)
- OS grid reference: NT678789
  - Edinburgh: 26 mi (42 km)
  - London: 325 mi (523 km)
- Council area: East Lothian Council
- Lieutenancy area: East Lothian
- Country: Scotland
- Sovereign state: United Kingdom
- Post town: DUNBAR
- Postcode district: EH42
- Dialling code: 01368
- Police: Scotland
- Fire: Scottish
- Ambulance: Scottish
- UK Parliament: Lothian East
- Scottish Parliament: East Lothian Coast and Lammermuirs

Dunbar (/dʌnˈbɑːr/) is a coastal town and former royal burgh on the North Sea coast in East Lothian in the south-east of Scotland, approximately 30 miles (48 km) east of Edinburgh and 30 miles (48 km) from the English border north of Berwick-upon-Tweed. It had a population of 10,777 in 2022.

The town got its name to an ecclesiastical and civil parish. The parish extends around 7 3/4 miles (12 km) east to west and is 3 1/2 miles (6 km) deep at its greatest extent, or 11 1/4 sq mi (29 km^{2}), and contains the villages of West Barns, Belhaven.

Dunbar has a harbour, dating from 1574, and is home to the Dunbar Lifeboat Station, the second-oldest RNLI station in Scotland. The Dunbar Primary School and Dunbar Grammar School opened in the 1950s and 1960s respectively. The town is the birthplace of the explorer, naturalist, and influential conservationist John Muir.

== History ==
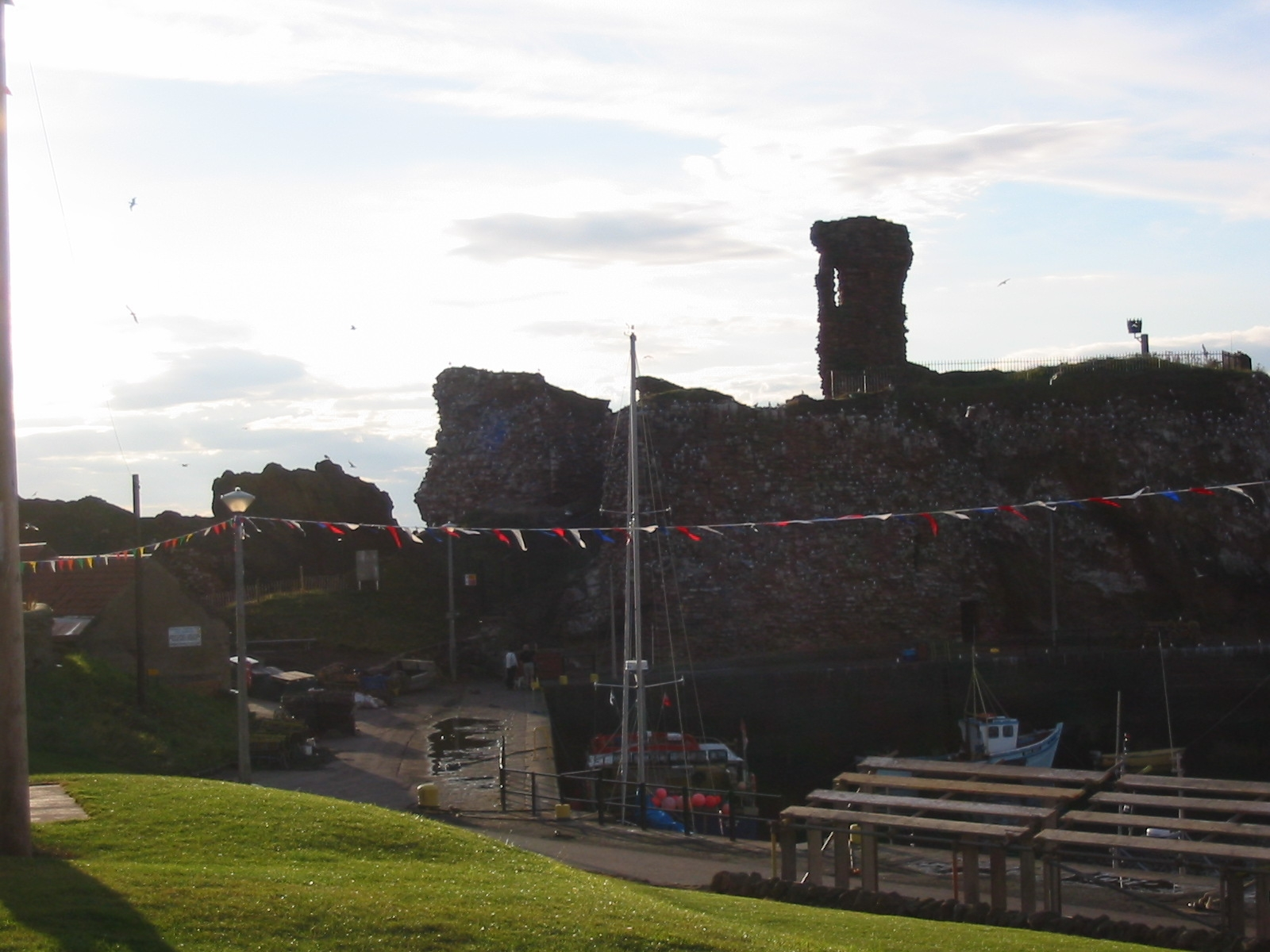
Castle at Dunbar Harbour

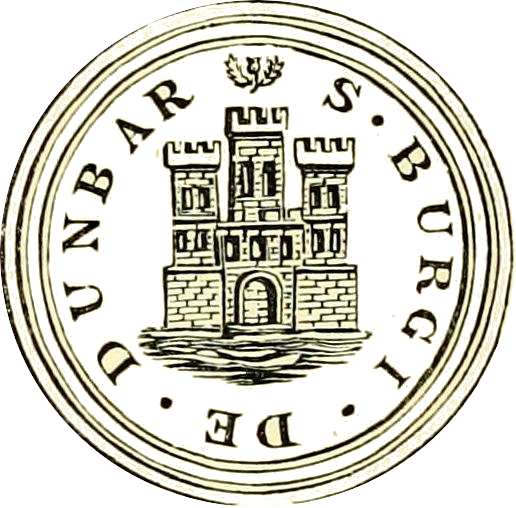
Seal of Dunbar from Groome's Gazetteer

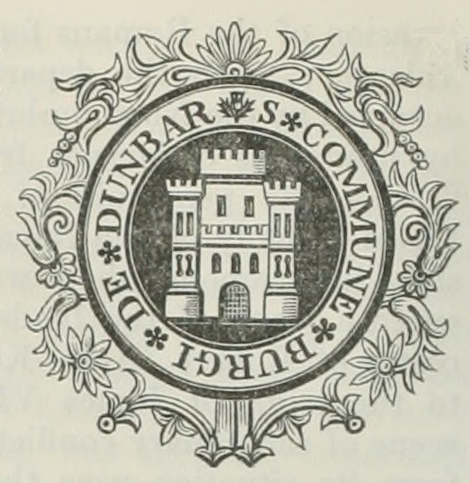
Seal of Dunbar from Samuel Lewis

=== Etymology ===
In its present form, the name Dunbar is derived from its Gaelic equivalent (modern Scottish Gaelic: Dùn Barra), meaning "summit fort". That itself is probably a Gaelicisation of the Cumbric form din-bar, with the same meaning. This form seems to be attested as Dynbaer in the seventh-century Vita Sancti Wilfrithi.

=== Pre-history ===
Excavations in advance of a housing development by CFA Archaeology, in 2003, found the remains of a later Bronze Age/early Iron Age (800–540 BC) person, indicating that people were living in the area during that time.

To the north of the present High Street, an area of open ground called Castle Park preserves almost exactly the hidden perimeter of an Iron Age promontory fort. The early settlement was a principal centre of the people known to the Romans as Votadini.

=== Early history ===
Dunbar was subsumed into Anglian Northumbria, as that kingdom expanded in the 6th century, and is believed to be synonymous with the Dynbaer of Eddius around 680, the first time that it appears in the written record.

The 2003 archaeological excavation also found a cemetery comprising 32 long-cist burials. Cemeteries of this type date from the early Christian period (AD 4th–8th centuries) and have been found in several areas around Dunbar, including to the east of Spott roundabout and at the swimming pool, which indicates a settlement existed during this time.

The influential Northumbrian monk and scholar St Cuthbert, born around 630, was probably from around Dunbar: while still a boy, and employed as a shepherd, one night he had a vision of the soul of Saint Aidan being carried to heaven by angels and thereupon went to the monastery of Old Melrose and became a monk.

It was then a king's vill and prison to Bishop Wilfrid. As a royal holding of the kings of Northumbria, the economy centred on the collecting of food renders and the administration of the northern (now Scottish) portion of that kingdom. It was the base of a senior royal official, a reeve (later sheriff).

=== Scottish conquest ===
Danish and Norse attacks on southern Northumbria caused its power to falter and the northern portion became equally open to annexation by Scotland. Dunbar was burnt by Kenneth MacAlpin in the ninth century. Scottish control was consolidated in the next century and when Lothian was ceded to Malcolm II after the battle of Carham in 1018, Dunbar was finally an acknowledged part of Scotland.

Throughout these turbulent centuries, Dunbar's status must have been preserved because it next features as part of a major land grant and settlement by Malcolm III in favour of the exiled earl Gospatric of Northumbria (to whom he may have been full cousin) during 1072. Malcolm needed to fill a power vacuum on his south-eastern flank; Gospatric required a base from which to plot the resumption of his Northumbrian holding. The grant included Dunbar and, it can be deduced, an extensive swath of East Lothian and Berwickshire or Merse (hence March). Gospatric founded the family of Dunbar. The head of the House of Dunbar filled the position of Earls of Dunbar and March until the 15th century.

=== Later history ===
The town became successively a baronial burgh and royal burgh (1370). Cultivated rabbit warrens on the links to the east and west of the town supplied food to the royal household. In 1589, storms and windblown sand destroyed the warren on the west links.

Major battles were fought nearby in 1296 and 1650. The latter was fought during the Wars of the Three Kingdoms between a Scottish Covenanter army and English Parliamentarians led by Oliver Cromwell. The Scots were routed, leading to the overthrow of the monarchy and the occupation of Scotland.

A permanent military presence was established in the town with the completion of Castle Park Barracks in 1855.

The local band, Dunbar Royal British Legion Pipe Band, which was founded in 1976, has competed with success in national competitions.

On 3 January 1987, a devastating fire destroyed much of the town's historic parish church: though the fire practically destroyed the monument and left only the outer walls remaining, the church has since been rebuilt with a modern interior.

== Archaeology ==
During 2003, archaeological excavations at Oxwell Mains (Lafarge Cement Works) near Dunbar revealed the site of a Mesolithic house believed to be from around the 9th millennium BC. The site suggests a domed building. Although considered extremely rare and a site of national importance, this site is in the middle of an area planned for quarrying.

An archaeological excavation undertaken by Headland Archaeology on a site previously occupied by the Captain's Cabin (a local landmark) within the area of Castle Park identified a sequence of archaeological features reflecting around 2,000 years of human activity.

The earliest feature was a large ditch ,which may have formed part of the defences around a promontory fort previously identified during earlier excavations near the coast at Castle Park. The scale of the ditches indicated an impressive monument. A radiocarbon date of between 50 BC and AD 70 was obtained from charcoal recovered from its infill.

Much later, a rectangular building was built over the top of the infilled ditch. Large quantities of burnt grain were recovered indicating that the building was a grain store that had been destroyed by fire. It was established that this was part of the Anglian settlement that had also been identified during earlier excavations.

Between the ninth and 11th centuries, the area was used as a cemetery. Archeologists excavated 76 articulated skeletons and the disarticulated remains of a further 51 individuals were recovered. The articulated skeletons were all buried in the standard Christian fashion. A small number of the skeletons were in long cists, but the majority were simple shroud burials.

A dump or midden above the cemetery contained many elephant ivory off-cuts dating to the 18th or 19th century.

== Geography ==
=== Environment ===
Dunbar has two promenades, forming part of the John Muir Way. These provide an ideal viewpoint to see Dunbar's geological features including volcanic deposits and dykes seen from a high vantage point on the western clifftop promenade which passes the town's Public and Winterfield parks.

There are two local beaches, the smaller East Beach next to the town featuring rock pools and the expansive Belhaven Beach on the outskirts.

Lochend Woods are a community resource owned and managed by the Dunbar Community Woodland Group.

=== Climate ===
As with most of the British Isles, Dunbar has an oceanic climate (Köppen: Cfb) with cool summers and mild winters. It is one of the sunniest and driest places in Scotland, with around 1,450 hours of sunshine and 600 mm (24 in) of rainfall annually. Temperature extremes range from 31.0 °C (87.8 °F) in August 1990 to −12.0 °C (10.4 °F) in January 1982.

Climate data for Dunbar (20 m or 66 ft asl, averages 1991–2020)
Month	Jan	Feb	Mar	Apr	May	Jun	Jul	Aug	Sep	Oct	Nov	Dec	Year
Mean daily maximum °C (°F)	7.3 (45.1)	7.9 (46.2)	9.5 (49.1)	11.5 (52.7)	14.1 (57.4)	17.0 (62.6)	19.1 (66.4)	18.9 (66.0)	16.9 (62.4)	13.5 (56.3)	10.0 (50.0)	7.7 (45.9)	12.8 (55.0)
Daily mean °C (°F)	4.8 (40.6)	5.1 (41.2)	6.4 (43.5)	8.2 (46.8)	10.6 (51.1)	13.5 (56.3)	15.4 (59.7)	15.3 (59.5)	13.6 (56.5)	10.5 (50.9)	7.3 (45.1)	5.0 (41.0)	9.7 (49.5)
Mean daily minimum °C (°F)	2.3 (36.1)	2.3 (36.1)	3.3 (37.9)	4.9 (40.8)	7.1 (44.8)	10.0 (50.0)	11.7 (53.1)	11.7 (53.1)	10.2 (50.4)	7.6 (45.7)	4.6 (40.3)	2.3 (36.1)	6.5 (43.7)
Average precipitation mm (inches)	48.4 (1.91)	38.8 (1.53)	39.1 (1.54)	34.3 (1.35)	45.6 (1.80)	61.9 (2.44)	64.1 (2.52)	61.5 (2.42)	50.1 (1.97)	63.4 (2.50)	58.3 (2.30)	56.6 (2.23)	622.1 (24.49)
Average precipitation days (≥ 1.0 mm)	10.2	8.4	8.6	7.6	9.0	10.0	10.7	10.1	8.7	11.0	11.2	10.9	116.4
Mean monthly sunshine hours	59.0	81.9	116.8	155.7	196.9	169.0	174.6	160.7	128.7	97.8	73.4	51.5	1,466
Source: Met Office

== Economy ==
The town centre has several independent, locally-owned retail businesses, including gift shops, salons, cafes, a community-owned bakery, grocer, fishmonger, traditional sweet shop, chocolatiere, florists, garden centre and pet shop. The town also has a zero waste shop, as well as several vintage and antique stores, and two charity shops. There are two RNLI shops reflecting the town's maritime connection. On the periphery of the town is a garden centre with cafe, an Asda supermarket, a restaurant and hotel owned by Marston's, named the Pine Marten.

Tourism is part of the economy. Agriculture remains important but fishing has declined, although the harbour is still active, mainly landing shellfish. The main manufacturers are Tarmac, producing cement at Oxwell Mains (the only integrated cement plant in Scotland), and Belhaven Brewery, producing Scottish Ale.

=== Fishing ===
By 1913, fishing from Dunbar was mainly focused on shellfish. The Annual Report of the Fishery Board for 1913 states: "The principal earnings are from crabs and lobsters. The other fisheries are not now of much importance.".

Fishery Statistics

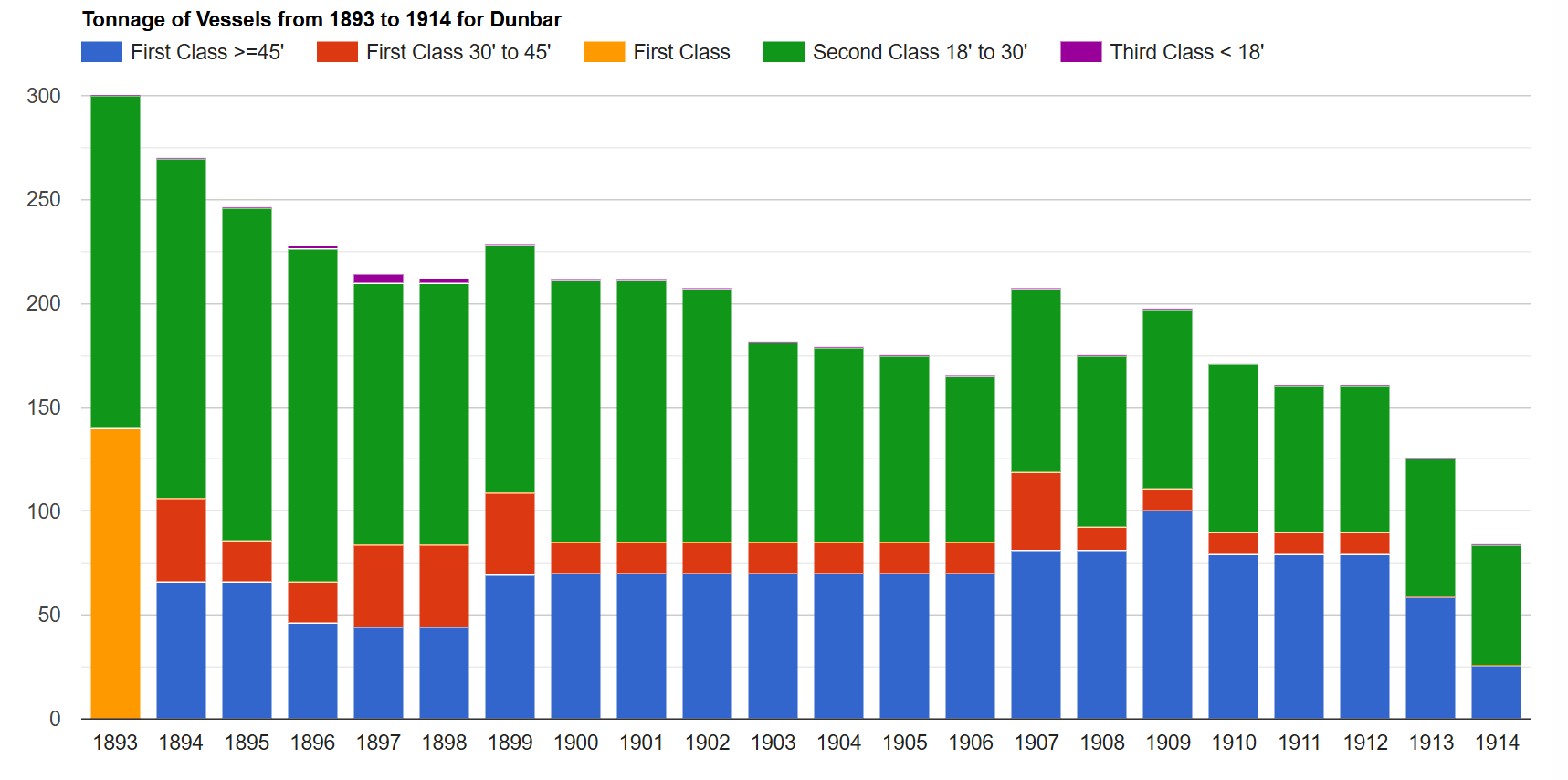
Tonnage of vessels

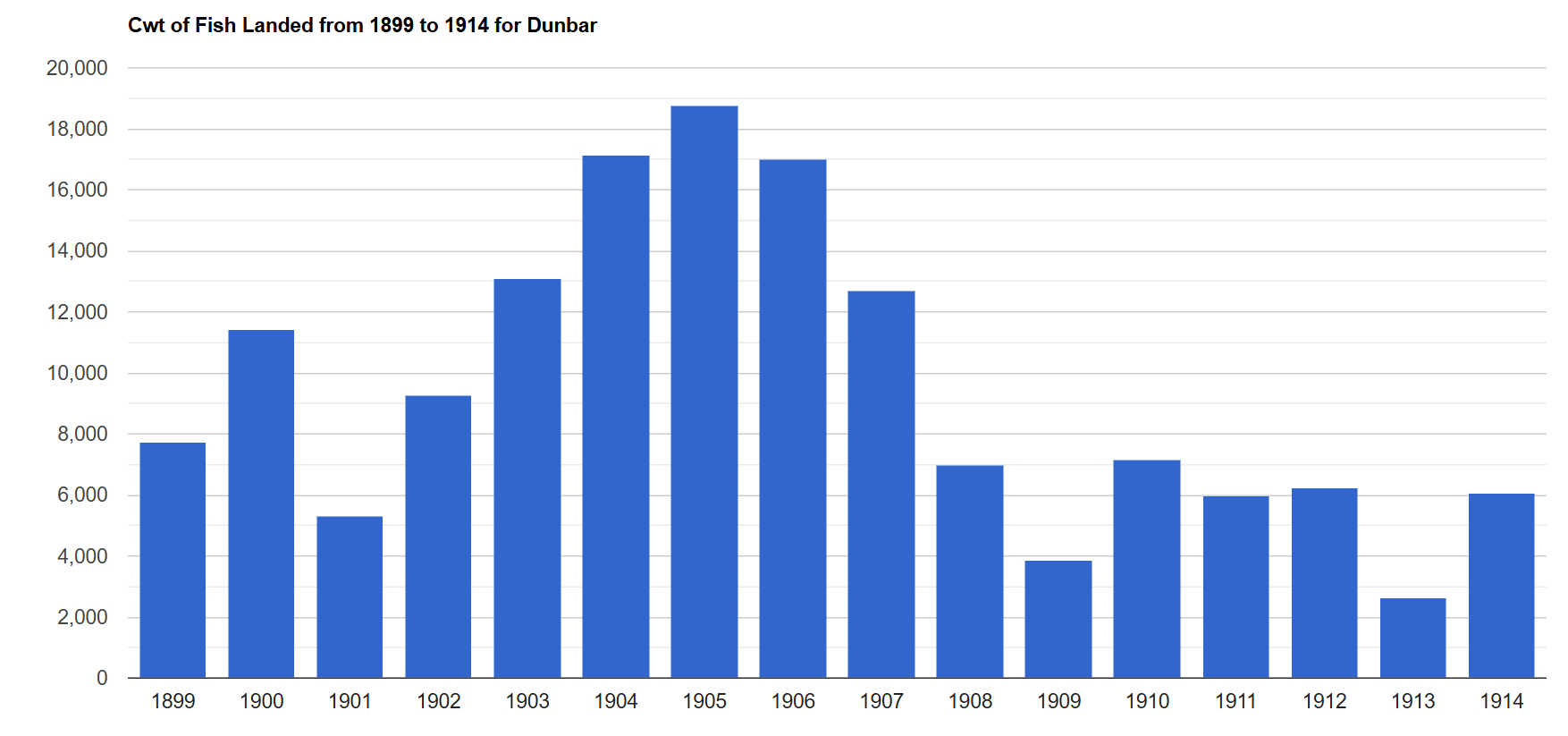
Cwt of fish landed (excluding shellfish)

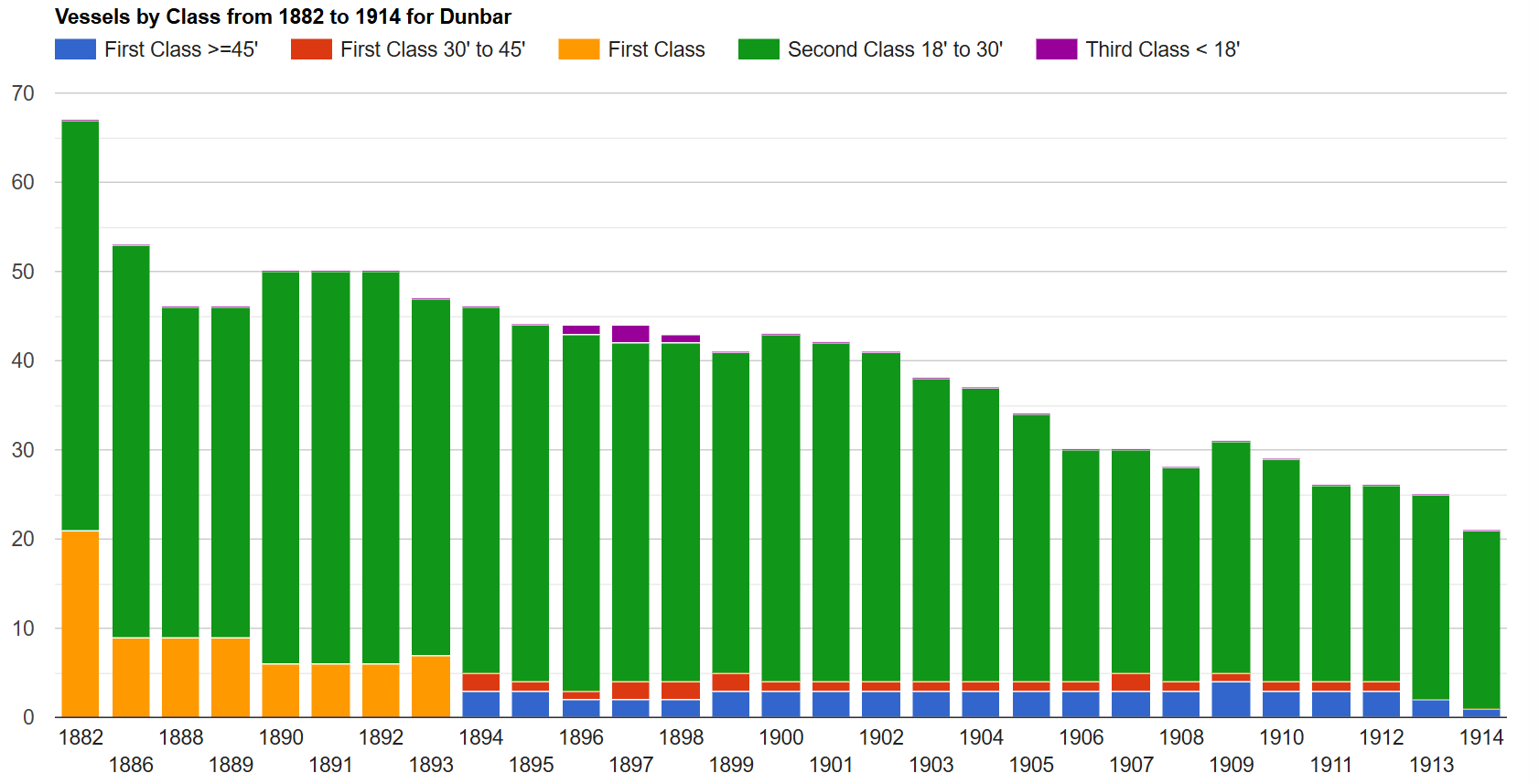
Vessels by class

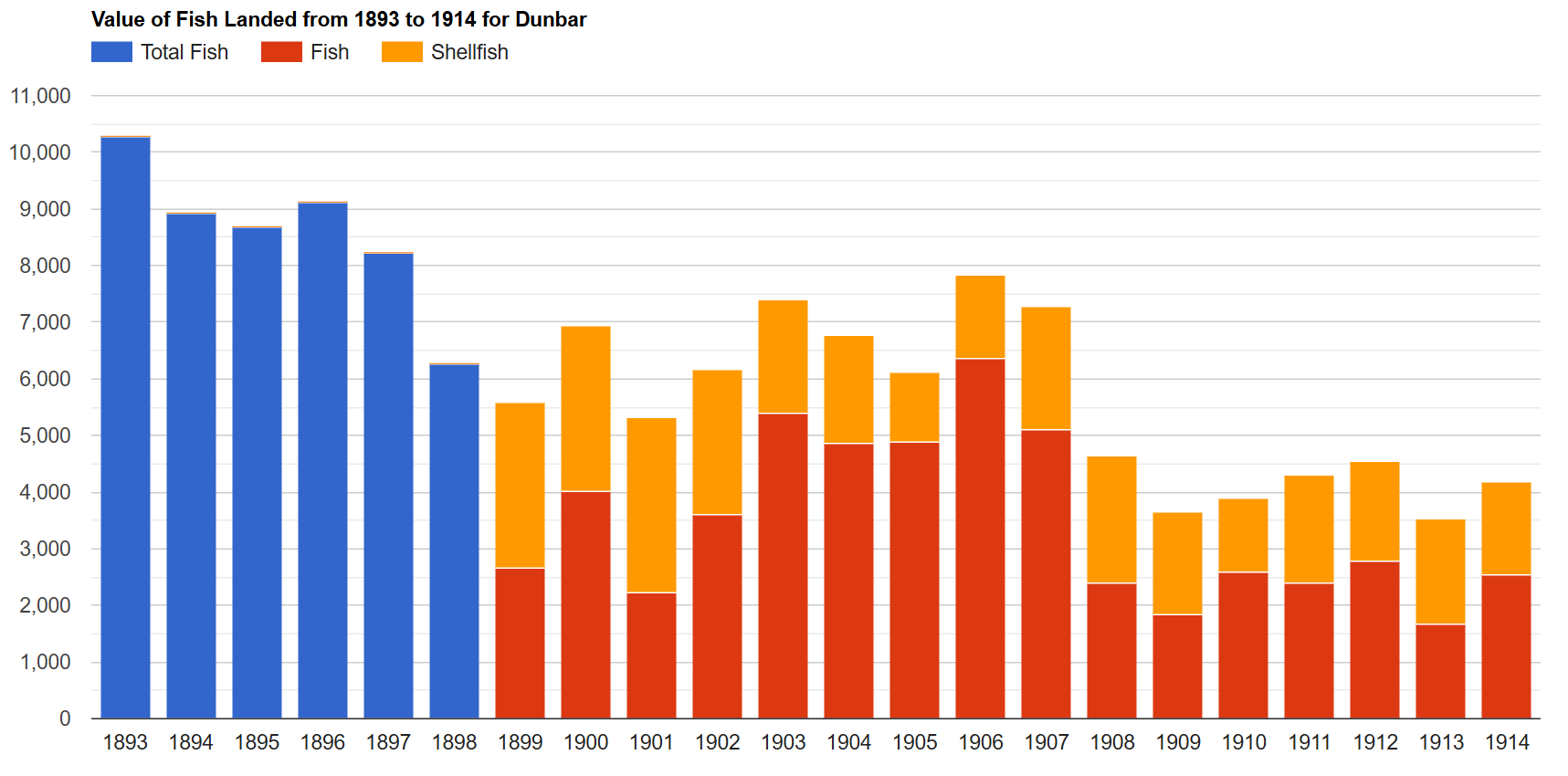
Value (£) of fish landed

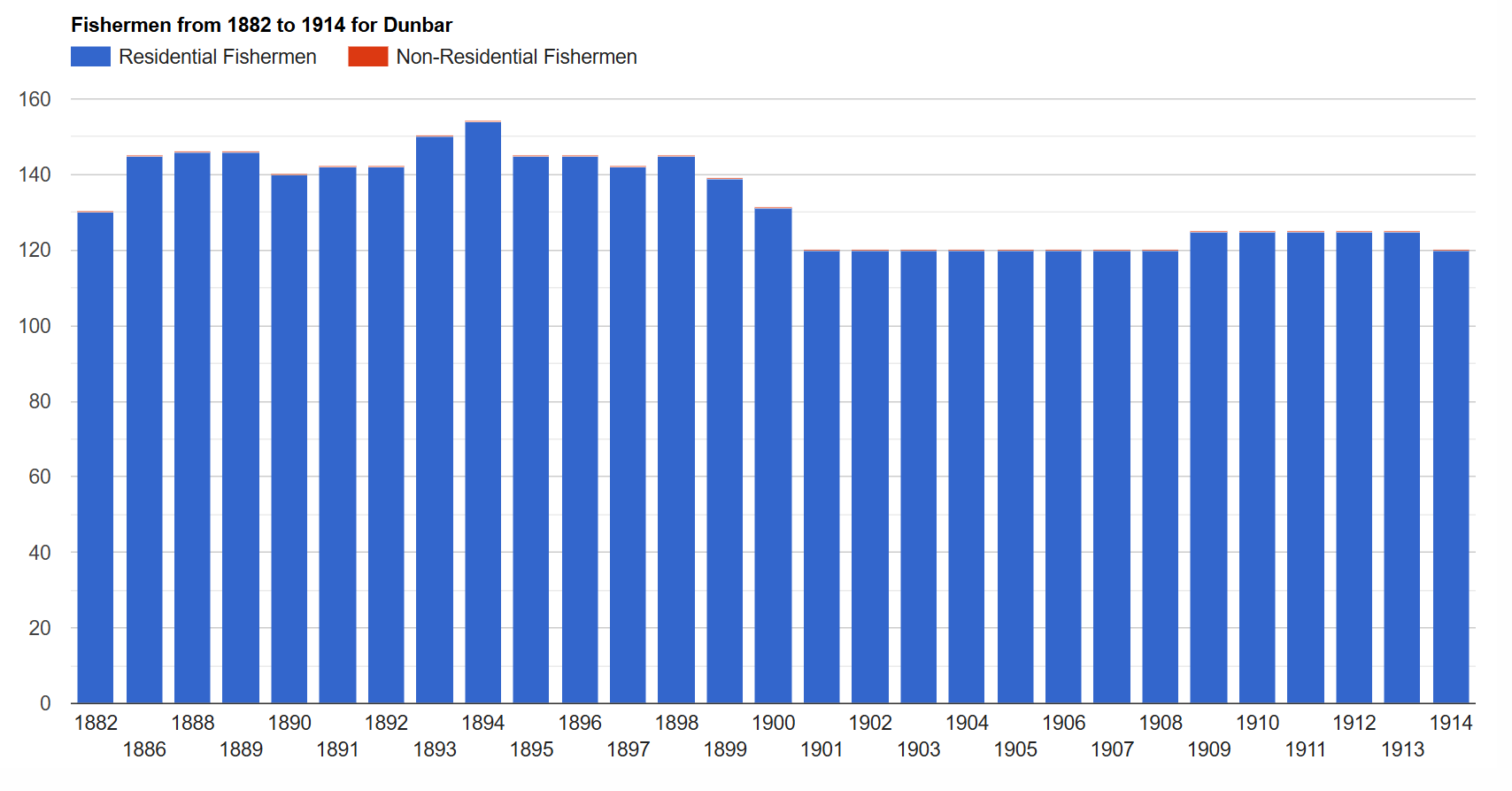
Fishermen

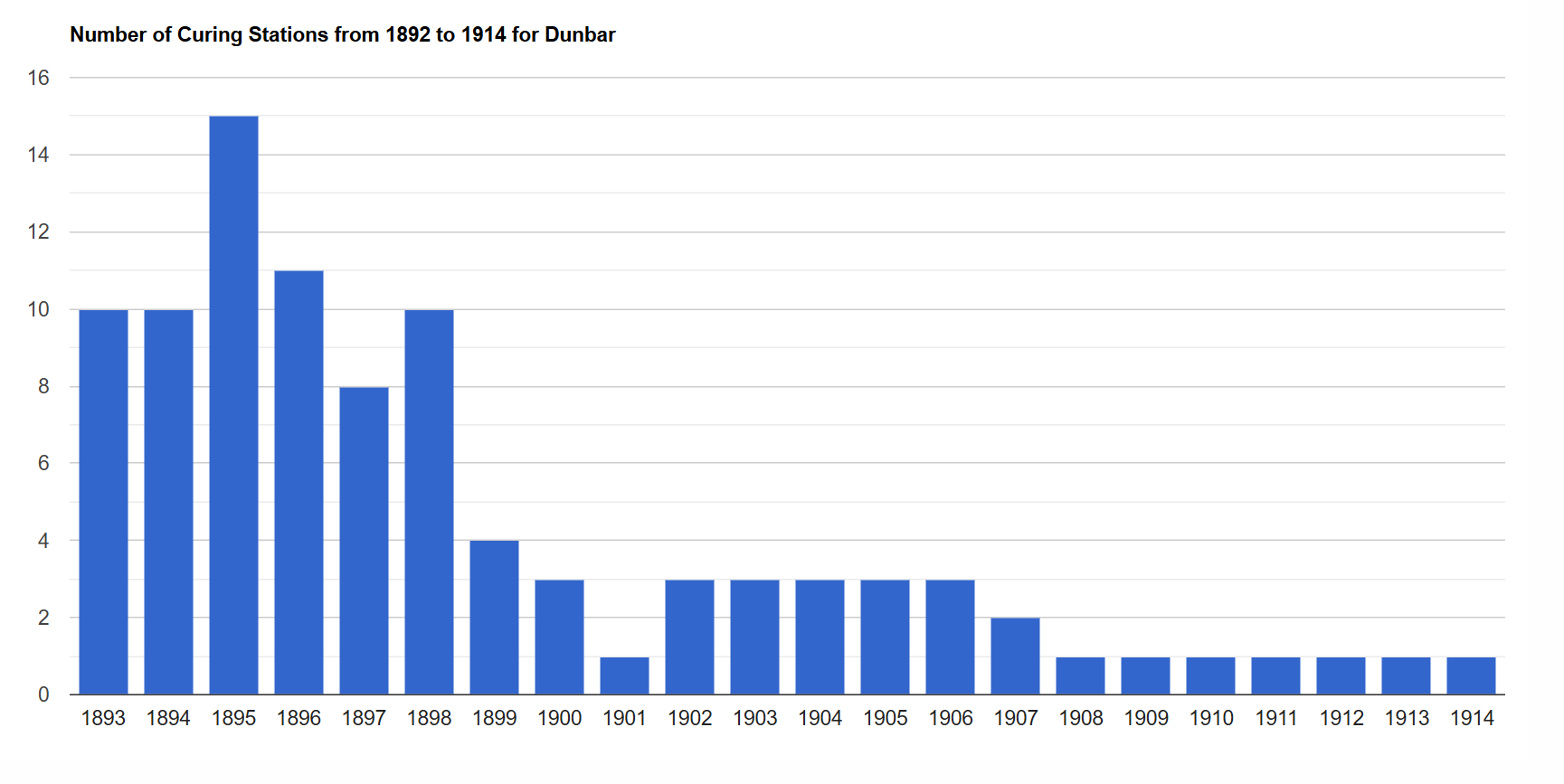
Number of curing stations

== Education ==
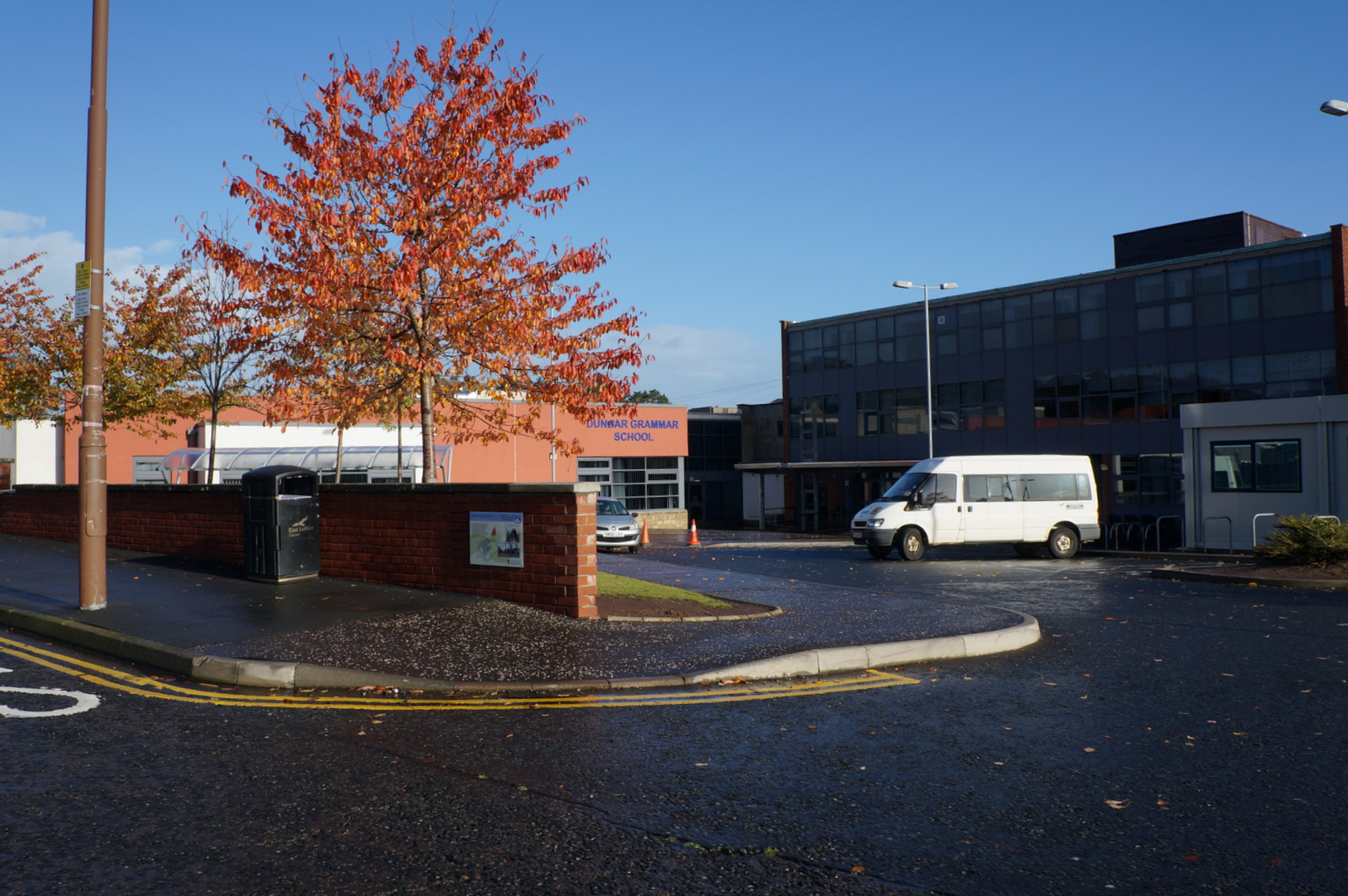
Dunbar Grammar School

The town itself is served by two primary schools: West Barns Primary School and Dunbar Primary School, It is split between two campuses: the original building which is now referred to as John Muir Campus taking Primary 1–3s along with nursery pupils, with the newer-built "Lochend Campus" taking Primary 4–7s.

Dunbar Grammar School is a non-denominational state secondary school, with a wide catchment area including the surrounding areas and villages of East Linton, Stenton and Oldhamstocks. The school currently has a roll of 1,006 pupils.

== Religion ==
The town was within the Church of Scotland presbytery of Dunbar:

- Coldingham, Parish and Priory (notices of Cockburnspath), A. Thomson (1908).
- The History of Dunbar. James Miller (1859).
- An Old Kirk Chronicle. Peter Hately Waddell, D.D. (1893).
- The Churches of St Baldred. Rev. A.I. Ritchie (1880).
- Saint Mary's, Whitekirk. Rev. E.B. Rankin (1914).
- History of Berwickshire Naturalists' Club (for Cockburnspath and Oldhamstocks).

Today, there are several churches in Dunbar:

Church of Scotland

- Dunbar Parish Church, Queens Road
- Dunglass Parish Church, Kirk Bridge
- Belhaven Parish Church, Belhaven Road

Episcopal and Methodist Church

- St. Anne's Church, Westgate
  - Methodist Church, Victoria Street

Catholic Church

- Our Lady of the Waves Church, Westgate.

== Transport ==
Dunbar railway station lies on the East Coast Main Line; it is served by four train operating companies:

- CrossCountry between Edinburgh Waverley and Plymouth, via Leeds, Birmingham New Street and Bristol Temple Meads
- London North Eastern Railway between Edinburgh Waverley and London Kings Cross, via Newcastle and York
- ScotRail to Edinburgh Waverley, via Musselburgh (stopping service)
- TransPennine Express between Edinburgh Waverley and Newcastle.

East Coast Buses and Borders Buses operate local services to Edinburgh, Musselburgh and North Berwick.

The town is served by the A1, connecting at Spott roundabout to the south of Dunbar.

== Notable buildings ==
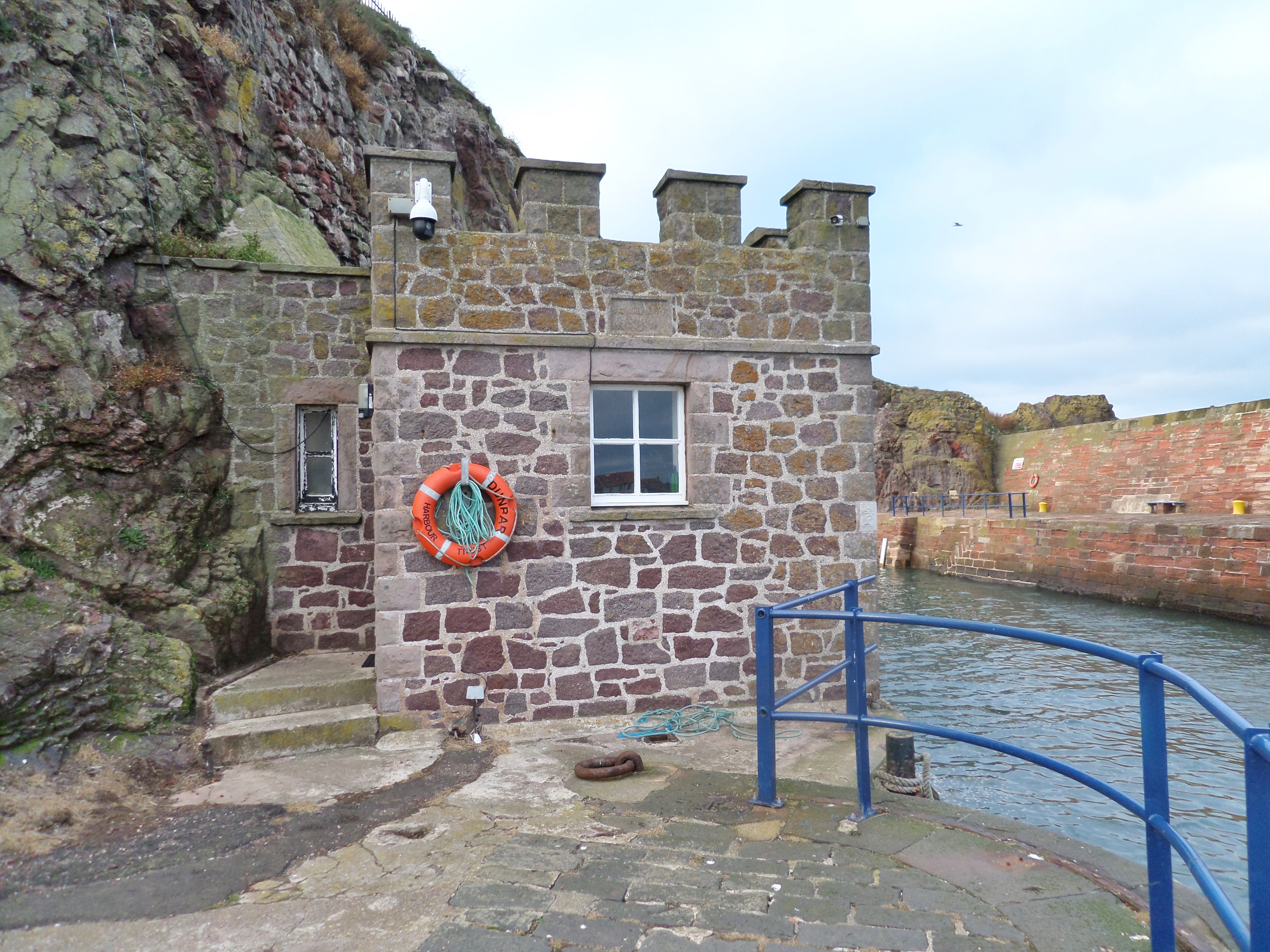
Ordnance Survey Tide Gauge House, Dunbar Harbour

- Chapel tower (with doocot conversion) of the Trinitarian Priory, Friarscroft, west of the town. Founded c. 1240 by Christiana de Brus, Countess of Dunbar.
- Dunbar Castle, possibly from the 14th century, rebuilt and remodelled c.1490 and c.1520. Largely ruined with the aid of gunpowder (deliberately by Act of Parliament) in 1567 and with the whole north end removed with the aid of explosives (detonated using a specially-invented electrical system) for the new Victoria Harbour 1842–44.
- Parish church by James Gillespie Graham 1818–21 in local red sandstone from Bourhouse quarry.
- Parish Church Hall (1910), located behind the post office off the High Street, contains stained glass removed from St Giles' Cathedral, Edinburgh, redundant there on the creation of the Thistle Chapel.
- Abbey Free Church (1850) by Thomas Hamilton.
- St Anne's Episcopal Church (1889) by Robert Rowand Anderson.
- Dunbar Methodist Church is the oldest Methodist Church in Scotland, having been erected in 1764. Both John Wesley and Charles Wesley were trustees of the Society in Dunbar and John preached at the Methodist Church on 21 occasions.
- Dunbar Town House, High Street, (c.1550).
- Mercat Cross (c.1911) created from medieval fragments to replace lost original sited opposite West Port. Now beside Town House.
- Lauderdale House (1790–92), designed by Robert Adam and executed by his brother John after Robert's death; built round the carcass of Dunbar House (c.1730).
- Railway station (1845), but since altered.
- Cromwell Harbour, very old fishing harbour which dates to 1600s.
- Ordance Survey Tidal Gauge - Beneath the Castle Rock at Victoria Harbour is a small castellated building, now the Harbourmaster's office, but originally built in 1913 by the Ordnance Survey and used as part of a network that was used to establish the 'Mean Sea Level' that is used as the reference benchmark for all heights 'above sea level' in the UK.
- Dunbar Battery (1781) was built to protect the town from privateers in the 18th century; it was restored in 2017 by Dunbar Harbour Trust, with improvements made to access and a new outdoor amphitheatre sensitively inserted within the defensive walls. The Dunbar Battery also features "Sea Cubes", a public artwork by Scottish artist Donald Urquhart. The project won the Architects' Journal Architecture Awards 2017 for the Best Budget Project of the Year and was Commended in the Scottish Civic Trust My Places Awards 2018.

== Sport ==
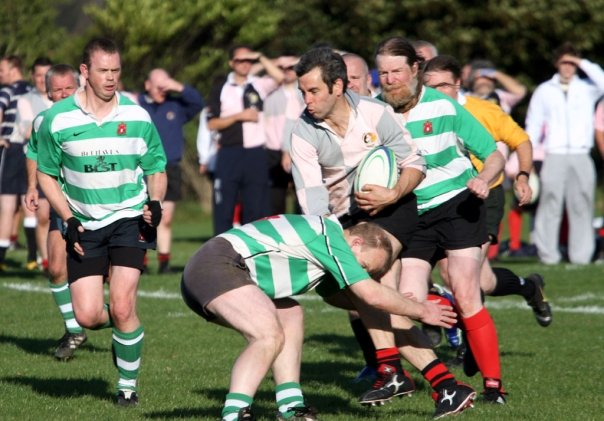
Dunbar RFC

=== Football ===
Dunbar is home to the football club Dunbar United, who play at New Countess Park and compete in the East of Scotland League Premier Division.

Dunbar United Colts Football Club play their home matches at Hallhill Sports Centre.

The town briefly had a senior club, Dunbar Town, immediately before the Second World War, which played in the East of Scotland League.

=== Golf ===
Dunbar Golf Club: Laid out in 1857 and redesigned by Old Tom Morris around 1894, Dunbar East Links is situated on the estuary of the Firth of Forth. It is used as an Open Championship Qualifying Venue when the Open is played at Muirfield and all of the major Scottish Championships have been played here, The Scottish Amateur, Scottish Professional Championships and Scottish Boys' Championship. The British Ladies and the Ladies' Home Internationals have also enjoyed the venue. Dunbar is also home to Winterfield Golf Club.

=== Rugby ===
Dunbar is also home to Dunbar RFC. They play their home games at Hallhill Sports Centre and operate a 1st XV, 2nd XV and various school teams. The 1st XV play in the East Region League Division 2.

=== Basketball ===
Dunbar Grammar School hosts basketball training for many school and club squads. School teams often participate in the Scottish Cup competition for their appropriate level. The school also hosts training for the club Dunbar Dragons.

=== Coastal rowing ===
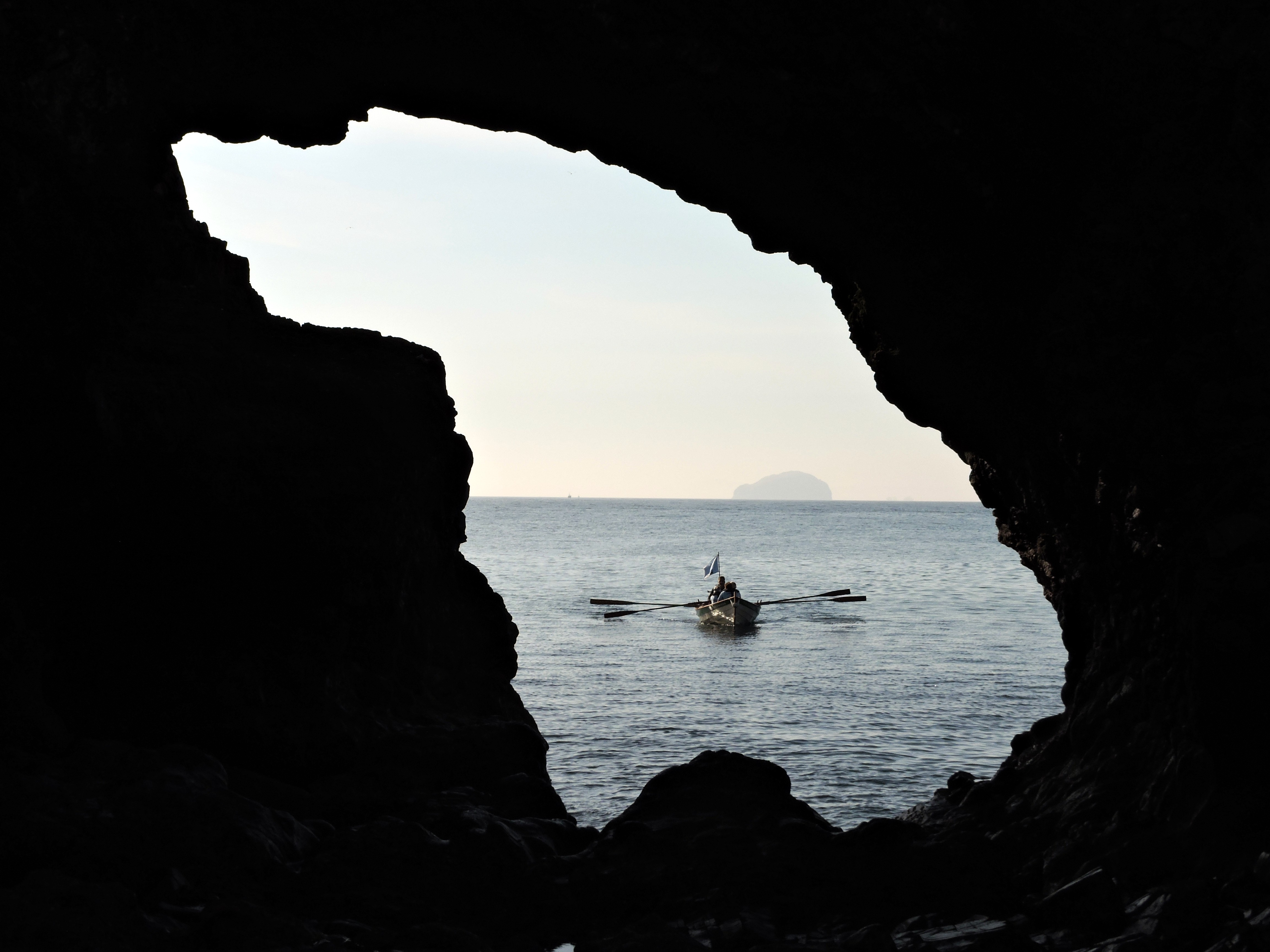
Rowing off Dunbar harbour mouth, with the Bass Rock in the background

Dunbar Coastal Rowing Club has two St Ayles Skiffs: Volunteer and Black Agnes. They are frequently seen rowing off the coast towards Belhaven or Torness or even just fishing. In 2018, they rowed to all of the named islands in the Firth of Forth and competed in the World Championships at Stranraer in 2019.

=== Wakeboarding ===
Foxlake in Dunbar was the first cable wakeboarding centre in Scotland. It also offers a water assault course, ringo rides and segways; there is a cafe in the centre.

=== Surfing and paddle boarding ===
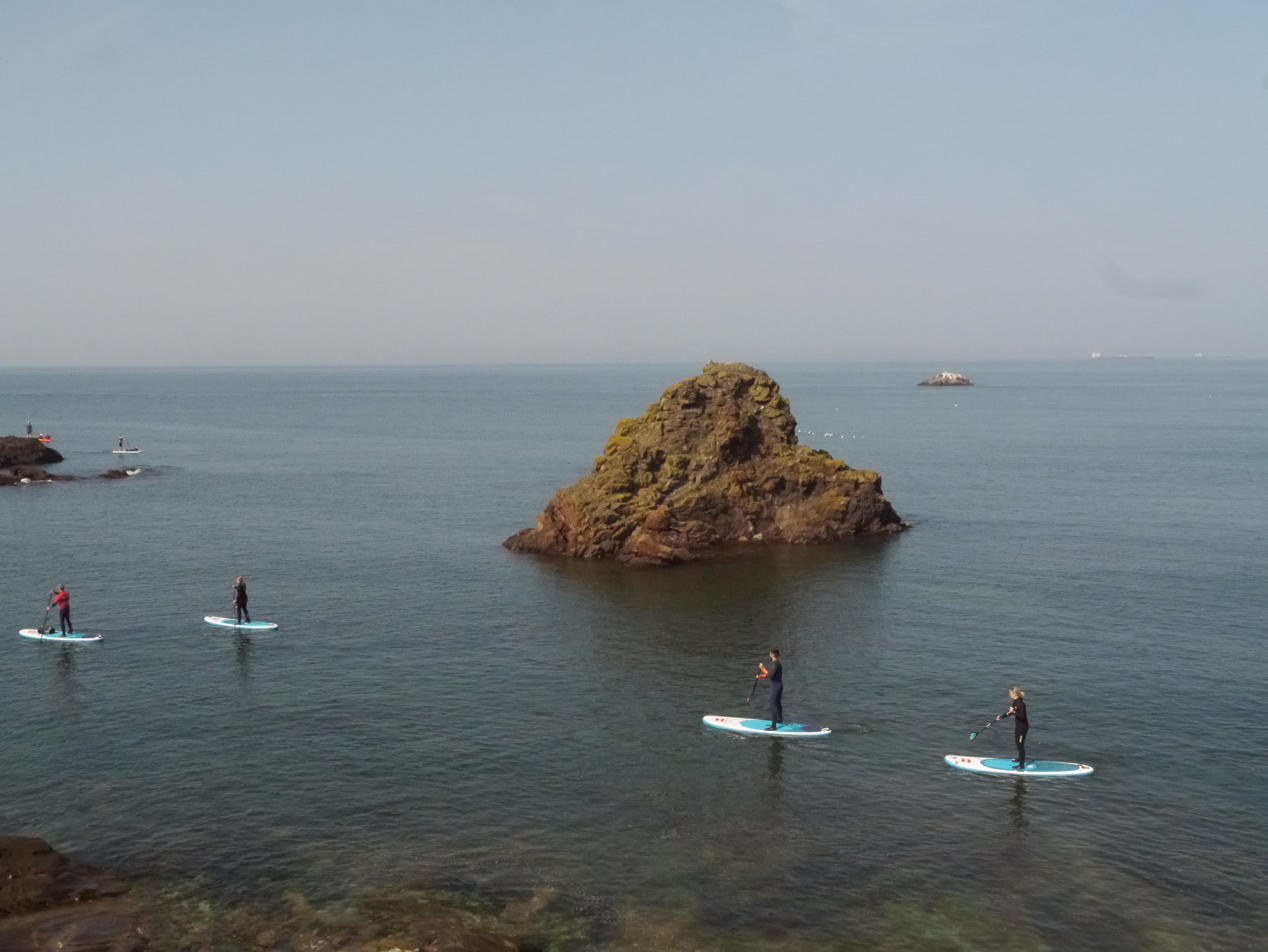
Paddleboarders at Eye Cave Beach

Surfing is popular on Belhaven Bay. The Coast to Coast surf school is located next to Belhaven Bay. Paddle boarding is also popular on Belhaven Bay.

== On film ==
Films which have shots of Dunbar include:

- Dunbar (1958) 3 min, B&W, silent
- Dunbar - The A1 Resort (1970) 20 in, colour, sound
- Lothian Landscape (1974) 21 min, colour. Narrated by Gordon Jackson
- Haunted locations featuring LPS on various TV outlets 2008–2018
- Outlander - John Muir Country Park, filmed camp scenes (2020–2022).

== Notable people ==
=== Pre-1000 ===
- Saint Wilfrid (633–709) – 7th to early 8th century English bishop and saint; imprisoned for a time in Dunbar
- Saint Cuthbert (634–687) – early saint and evangelist of the Northumbrian church, Bishop of Lindisfarne, at a time when Northumbria was a leader in promoting and spreading the message of Christianity in a British and wider European context and he was, according to some authors, born in and initially brought up in Dunbar to a local noble family, before being fostered in the Melrose area with a related or allied family as per the traditions of his class and time.

=== 1001–1500 ===
- Black Agnes (1312–1369) – Countess of Dunbar and heroine of local folklore
- Joan Beaufort, Queen of Scots (1404–1445) – wife of King James I of Scotland, who served as the Regent of Scotland in the immediate aftermath of his death and during the minority of her son James II of Scotland, before being engulfed in a power struggle with members of the nobility. In desperation, she took refuge in Dunbar Castle, where she was subsequently besieged by her opponents, in which place and circumstances she died in the year 1445.
- Alexander Stewart, Duke of Albany (1454–1485) – second son of King James II of Scotland and Mary of Guelders, was Duke of Albany, Earl of March, Lord of Annandale and Isle of Man and the Warden of the Marches, which altogether gave him an impressive power base in the east and west borders, centred on Dunbar Castle, which he owned and lived in. He attempted to seize control of Scotland from his brother King James III of Scotland, but was ultimately unsuccessful.
- John Stewart, Duke of Albany (1482–1536) – de facto ruler of Scotland and important soldier, diplomat, and politician in a Scottish and continental European context, was the only son of the above Duke of Albany, and managed where his father had failed and became Regent of Scotland, while he also became Count of Auvergne and Lauraguais in France and, lastly, inherited from his father the position of Earl of March, which allowed him to likewise use Dunbar Castle as his centre of power.

=== 1501–1900 ===
- James Hepburn, 4th Earl of Bothwell (1534–1578) – notorious third and last husband of Mary, Queen of Scots, and owner of Dunbar Castle
- Alexander Dow (1735–1779) – influential Orientalist, author and British East India Company army officer; resident and educated in Dunbar for part of his boyhood
- Robert Wilson (1803–1882) – one of the inventors of the ship's propeller, born and bred in Dunbar from a local family
- Sir Anthony Home (1826–1914) – British soldier who was notable as a recipient of the Victoria Cross and the eventual achievement of the rank of Surgeon-General of the British Armed Forces; born and bred in Dunbar from a local family
- John Muir (1838–1914) – important conservationist, geologist, environmental philosopher and pacifist; one of the founders of the United States' system of national parks and Sierra Club, was born in Dunbar
- Walter Runciman, 1st Baron Runciman (1847–1937) – major shipowner and maverick Liberal politician, born in Dunbar to parents from Dunbar
- General Sir Reginald Wingate (1861–1953) – 1st Baronet, army officer and colonial governor, 'the maker of the Anglo-Egyptian Sudan', Governor-General of the Sudan (1899–1916), British High Commissioner in Egypt (1917–1919), commander of military operations in the Hedjaz (1916–1919), for many years the senior general of the British army, long-time resident in Dunbar
- Jack Hobens (1880–1944) – Scottish-American professional golfer
- John Turnbull (actor) (1880)
- Dr James Wyllie Gregor (1900–1980) – botanist, born in Dunbar.

=== 1901–present ===
- William Alexander Bain (1905–1971) – pharmacologist
- Sadie Aitken (1905–1985) – Scottish actor, theatre manager and film critic for the BBC
- Hugh Trevor-Roper (1914–2003) – renowned English historian who boarded at Belhaven Hill School
- Davy Henderson (b. 1962) – Scottish musician (The Fire Engines, The Nectarine No. 9)
- Maria Lyle (b. 2000) – parasprinter, won medals at both the Commonwealth and Paralympic Games.

== Twin towns ==
Dunbar is twinned with:

- Lignières, Cher, France.
- Martinez, California, United States.

== Gallery ==
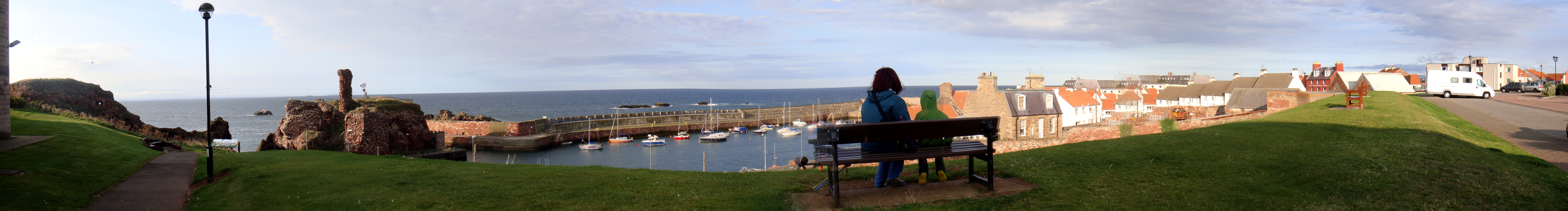
Dunbar Castle and Victoria Harbour

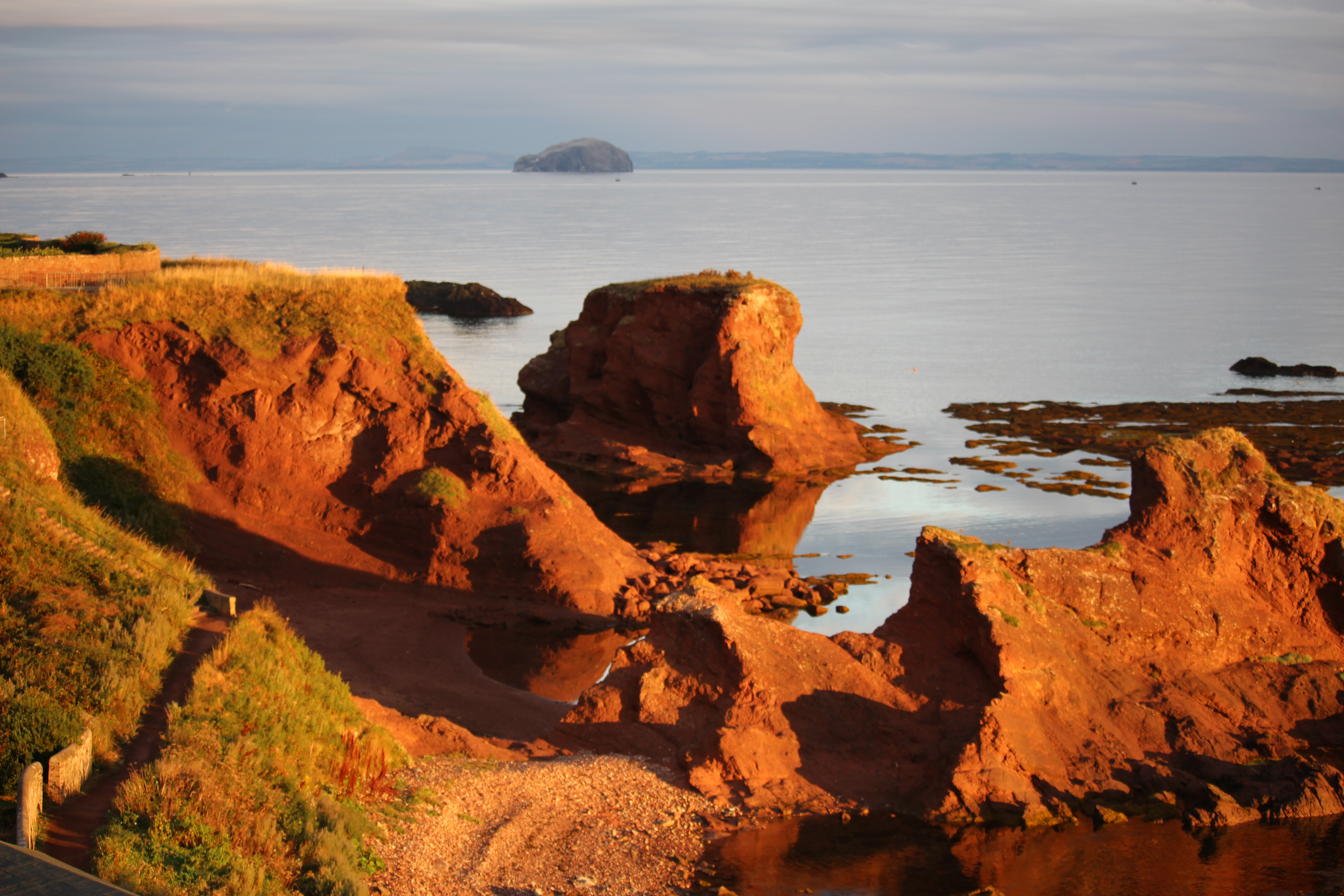
Bass Rock from Dunbar

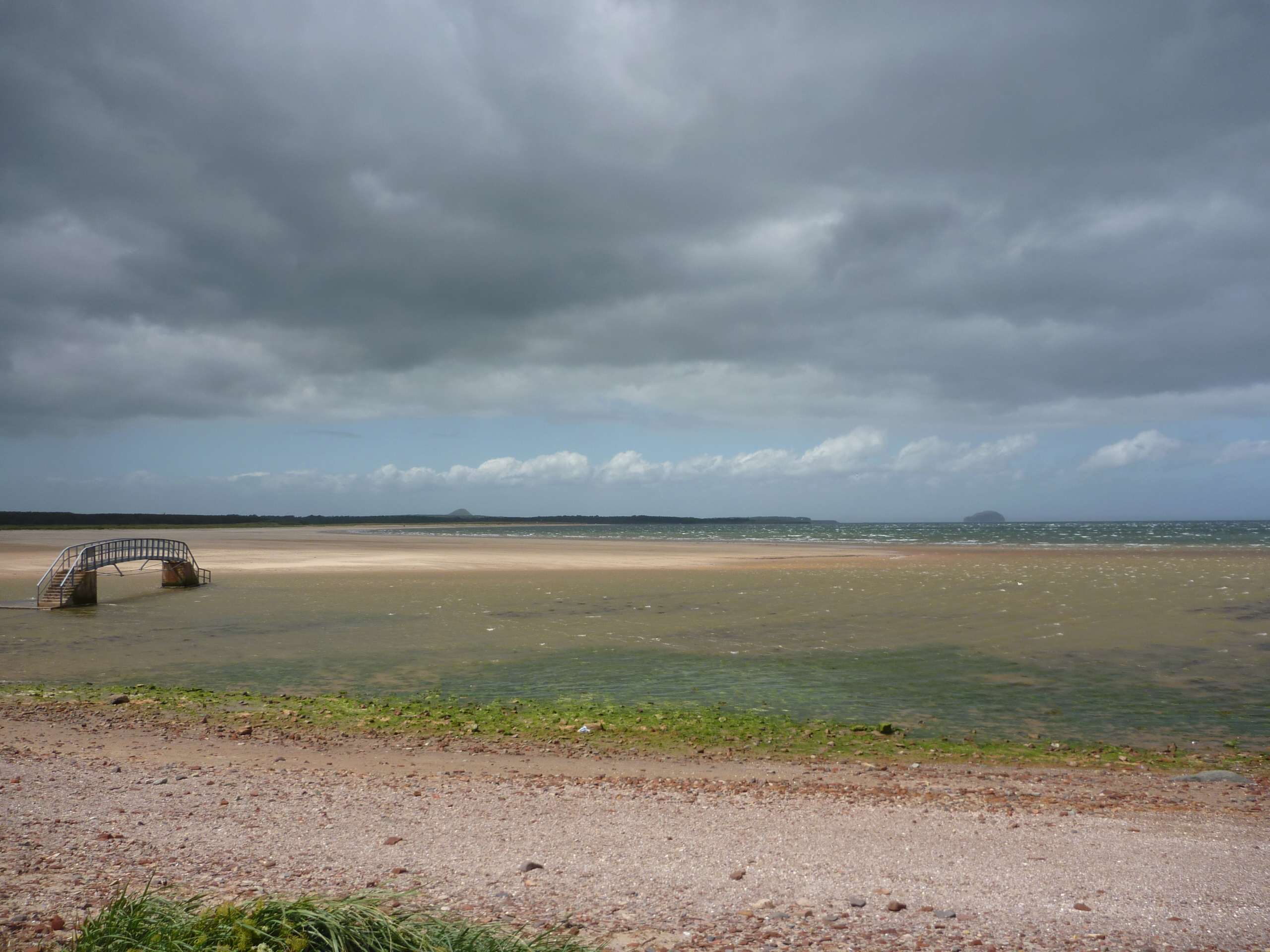
The Bridge to Nowhere, with The Bass and the North Berwick Law

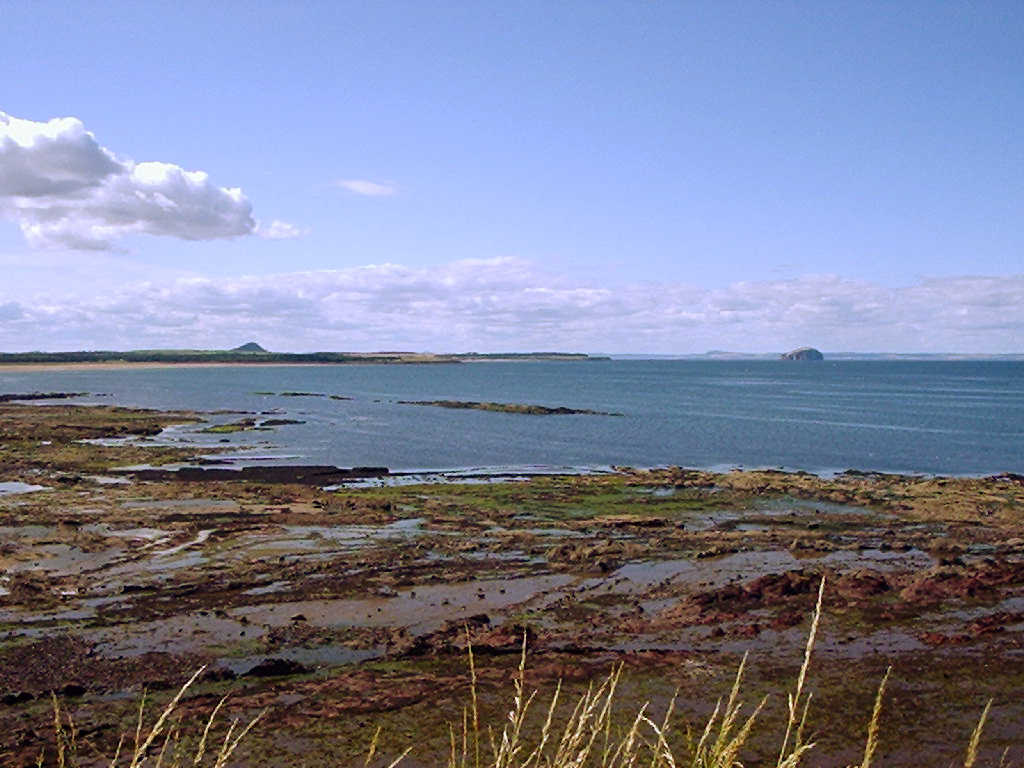
View towards Belhaven Bay (John Muir Country Park) with North Berwick Law and Bass Rock in the distance

== See also ==
- John Muir's Birthplace
- John Muir Way
- List of places in East Lothian
