= Jethro Tull discography =

Cataloguing of published recordings by Jethro Tull

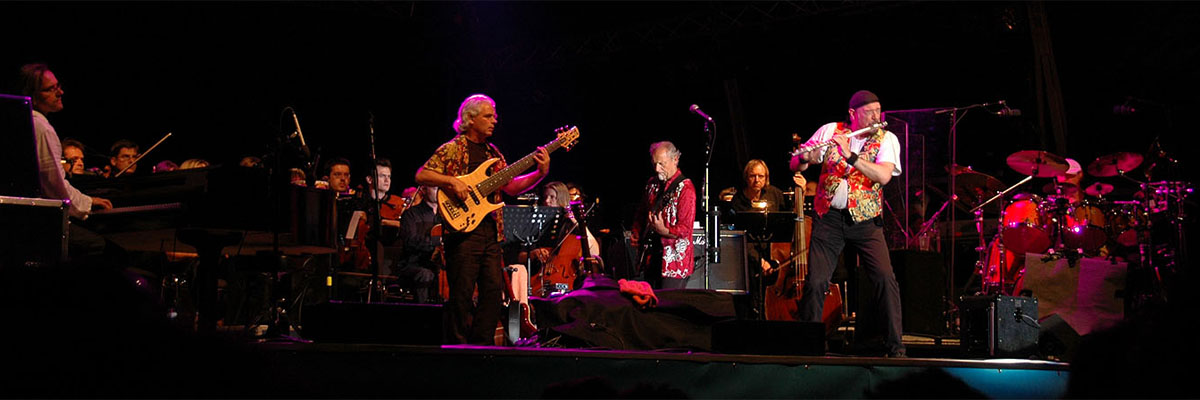
- Jethro Tull with Neue Philharmonie Frankfurt in June 2007
- Studio albums: 25
- Extended plays: 4
- Live albums: 9
- Compilation albums: 15
- Singles: 33
- Video albums: 12

This is the discography of the British progressive rock band Jethro Tull who formed in Blackpool, Lancashire in 1967. Initially playing blues rock, the band's sound soon incorporated elements of British folk music and hard rock to forge a progressive rock signature. The band is led by vocalist/flautist/guitarist Ian Anderson and has included other significant members such as guitarist Martin Barre, drummer Doane Perry and bassist Dave Pegg.

== Albums ==
=== Studio albums ===
Title	Album details	Peak chart position								Certifications sales thresholds
Title	Album details	UK	AUS	AUT	GER	NOR	SWE	SWI	US	Certifications sales thresholds
This Was	Released: 25 October 1968; Label: Reprise; Chrysalis; Format: LP, CD	10	–	–	28	–	–	–	62	
Stand Up	Released: 25 July 1969; Label: Island; Reprise; Format: LP, CD	1	12	–	5	5	11	–	20	UK: Silver; US: Gold
Benefit	Released: 24 April 1970; Label: Island; Chrysalis; Format: LP, CD	3	12	30	5	2	11	–	11	US: Gold
Aqualung	Released: 19 March 1971; Label: Island; Chrysalis; Format: LP, CD	4	3	60	5	3	7	–	7	GER: Gold; UK: Gold; US: 3× Platinum
Thick as a Brick	Released: 3 March 1972; Label: Chrysalis; Format: LP, CD	5	1	–	2	3	7	70	1	US: Gold
A Passion Play	Released: 13 July 1973; Label: Chrysalis; Format: LP, CD	16	9	4	5	5	11	–	1	UK: Silver; US: Gold
War Child	Released: 14 October 1974; Label: Chrysalis; Format: LP, CD	14	9	–	24	8	–	–	2	US: Gold
Minstrel in the Gallery	Released: 5 September 1975; Label: Chrysalis; Format: LP, CD	20	20	7	14	13	50	–	7	CAN: Gold; UK: Silver; US: Gold
Too Old to Rock 'n' Roll: Too Young to Die!	Released: 23 April 1976; Label: Chrysalis; Format: LP, CD	25	27	10	26	10	27	–	14	
Songs from the Wood	Released: 4 February 1977; Label: Chrysalis; Format: LP, CD	13	26	23	10	8	22	45	8	CAN Gold; UK: Silver; US: Gold
Heavy Horses	Released: 10 April 1978; Label: Chrysalis; Format: LP, CD	20	17	18	4	13	27	30	19	CAN: Gold; UK: Silver; US: Gold
Stormwatch	Released: 14 September 1979; Label: Chrysalis; Format: LP, CD	27	17	–	8	15	–	42	22	CAN: Gold; US: Gold
A	Released: 29 August 1980; Label: Chrysalis; Format: LP, CD	25	47	10	21	9	–	–	30	
The Broadsword and the Beast	Released: 9 April 1982; Label: Chrysalis; Format: LP, CD	27	18	18	4	14	–	15	19	UK: Silver
Under Wraps	Released: 7 September 1984; Label: Chrysalis; Format: LP, CD	18	45	–	15	–	43	9	76	
A Classic Case (with London Symphony Orchestra)	Released: 31 December 1985 (US) 15 February 1985 (UK); Label: RCA Red Seal; Format: LP, CD	–	–	–	–	–	–	–	93	
Crest of a Knave	Released: 11 September 1987; Label: Chrysalis; Format: LP, CD	19	57	19	10	–	40	7	32	CAN: Gold; UK: Gold; US: Gold
Rock Island	Released: 21 August 1989; Label: Chrysalis; Format: LP, CD	18	81	20	5	14	35	7	56	UK: Silver
Catfish Rising	Released: 2 September 1991; Label: Chrysalis; Format: LP, CD	27	153	36	21	12	48	12	88	
Roots to Branches	Released: 4 September 1995; Label: Chrysalis; Format: LP, CD	20	141	–	55	27	21	25	114	
J-Tull Dot Com	Released: 23 August 1999; Label: Papillon (UK); Fuel 2000 (US and Canada); Format: CD	44	–	–	8	–	–	50	161	
The Jethro Tull Christmas Album	Released: 30 September 2003; Label: Fuel 2000; Format: CD, LP	73	–	60	12	–	–	–	–	
The Zealot Gene	Released: 28 January 2022; Label: Inside Out Music; Format: 2×LP, CD, Blu-ray	9	–	5	4	–	22	3	–	
RökFlöte	Released: 21 April 2023; Label: Inside Out Music; Format: 2×LP, CD, Blu-ray	17	–	4	4	36	–	3	–	
Curious Ruminant	Released: 7 March 2025; Label: Inside Out Music; Format: LP, CD, Blu-ray, Digital download, streaming	25	–	4	2	–	58	5	–	
"–" denotes releases that did not chart or were not released in that country.

=== Live albums ===
Title	Album details	Peak chart position							Certifications sales thresholds
Title	Album details	UK	AUS	AUT	GER	NOR	SWI	US	Certifications sales thresholds
Live – Bursting Out	Released: 22 September 1978; Label: Chrysalis; Format: LP, cassette, CD	17	20	16	7	20	12	21	CAN: Gold; UK: Silver; US: Gold
Live at Hammersmith '84	Released: 10 December 1990; Label: Raw Fruit; Format: LP	–	–	–	–	–	–	–	
A Little Light Music	Released: 14 September 1992; Label: Chrysalis; Format: Cassette, CD	34	181	–	–	–	22	150	
In Concert	Released: 1995; Label: Windsong International; Format: LP	–	–	–	–	–	–	–	
Living with the Past	Released: 30 April 2002; Label: Eagle; Format: CD	–	–	–	75	–	–	–	
Nothing Is Easy: Live at the Isle of Wight 1970	Released: 2 November 2004; Label: Eagle; Format: CD	–	–	–	–	–	–	–	
Aqualung Live	Released: 20 September 2005; Label: RandM; Format: CD	–	–	–	78	–	–	–	
Live at Montreux 2003	Released: 20 August 2007; Label: Eagle; Format: LP, CD	–	–	–	38	–	–	–	
Live at Madison Square Garden 1978	Released: 2009; Label: Chrysalis/EMI; Format: CD	–	–	–	–	–	–	–	
Live at Carnegie Hall 1970	Released: 2015; Label: Parlophone; Format: LP	–	–	–	–	–	–	–	
Live From Baloise Session, Basel Switzerland 15/11/2008	Released: 2025; Label: earMUSIC; Format: LP, CD	–	–	–	–	–	–	–	
"–" denotes releases that did not chart or were not released in that country.

=== Compilation albums ===
Title	Album details	Peak chart positions							Certifications sales thresholds
Title	Album details	UK	AUS	GER	NOR	SWE	SWI	US	Certifications sales thresholds
Living in the Past	Released: 23 June 1972; Label: Chrysalis; Format: LP, CD	8	2	8	5	12	–	3	UK: Silver; US: Gold
M.U. – The Best of Jethro Tull	Released: January 1976; Label: Chrysalis; Format: LP, CD	44	31	–	–	–	–	13	AUS: Gold; GER: Gold; UK: Gold; US: Platinum
Repeat – The Best of Jethro Tull – Vol II	Released: 9 September 1977; Label: Chrysalis; Format: LP, cassette, CD	–	92	–	–	–	–	94	
Original Masters	Released: October 1985; Label: Chrysalis; Format: LP, cassette, CD	63	98	–	–	–	–	–	UK: Silver; US: Platinum
20 Years of Jethro Tull: Box Set	Released: 27 June 1988; Label: Chrysalis; Format: LP, cassette, CD	78	100	–	–	–	–	97	
20 Years of Jethro Tull: Highlights	Released: 10 October 1988; Label: Chrysalis; Format: LP, cassette, CD	–	94	–	–	–	–	–	
25th Anniversary Box Set	Released: 26 April 1993; Label: Chrysalis; Format: CD	–	174	81	–	–	–	–	
Nightcap	Released: 22 November 1993; Label: Chrysalis; Format: CD	–	131	–	–	–	–	–	
The Best of Jethro Tull – The Anniversary Collection (two-CD compilation)	Released: 24 May 1993; Label: Chrysalis; Format: CD	–	112	–	–	–	–	–	
Through the Years	Released: 30 June 1998; Label: Disky Communications Europe; Format: CD	–	–	–	–	–	–	–	
The Very Best of Jethro Tull	Released: 5 June 2001; Label: Chrysalis; Format: CD	–	–	65	13	–	99	–	UK: Gold
The Essential Jethro Tull	Released: 3 June 2003; Label: Chrysalis; Format: CD	–	–	–	–	–	–	–	
The Best of Acoustic Jethro Tull	Released: 12 March 2007; Label: Chrysalis; Format: CD	–	–	–	–	–	–	–	
Jethro Tull Essential	Released: 12 September 2011; Label: Chrysalis; Format: CD	–	–	–	–	–	–	–	
10 Great Songs	Released: 3 April 2012; Label: Capitol / EMI; Format: CD	–	–	–	–	–	–	–	
50 for 50	Released: 1 June 2018; Label: Parlophone; Format: CD	–	–	–	–	–	–	–	
50th Anniversary Collection	Released: 1 June 2018; Label: Parlophone, Chrysalis; Format: LP, CD	73	–	48	–	–	–	–	
"–" denotes releases that did not chart or were not released in that country.

== Extended plays ==
Title	Details	Peak chart position		
Title	Details	UK	GER	IRL
Life Is a Long Song	Released: 3 September 1971; Label: Chrysalis; Format: 7" vinyl	11	41	14
Ring Out, Solstice Bells	Released: 26 November 1976; Label: Chrysalis; Format: 7" vinyl	28	–	–
Home	Released: November 1979; Label: Chrysalis; Format: 7" vinyl	–	–	–
Ring Out, Solstice Bells	Released: 2004; Label: R&M; Format: CD	78	–	–
North Sea Oil	Released: 2019; Label: Chrysalis; Format: 10" vinyl	–	–	–
"–" denotes releases that did not chart or were not released in that country.

== Singles ==
Year	Title	Peak chart position									Album
Year	Title	UK	AUS	BEL (WA)	CAN	GER	IRL	NLD	US	US Main	Album
1968	"Sunshine Day" (Note: released in the UK)	–	–	–	–	–	–	–	–	x	non-album single
1968	"A Song for Jeffrey"	–	–	–	–	–	–	–	–	x	This Was
1968	"Love Story"	29	51	–	–	–	–	–	–	x	non-album singles
1969	"Living in the Past"	3	–	–	–	–	5	–	–	x	non-album singles
1969	"Sweet Dream"	7	–	37	–	14	11	–	–	x	non-album singles
1969	"Bourée" (Note: released in Europe)	–	–	20	–	37	–	5	–	x	Stand Up
1970	"The Witch's Promise"	4	91	46	–	28	6	23	–	x	non-album single
1970	"Inside"	–	–	–	–	–	–	–	–	x	Benefit
1971	"Locomotive Breath" (Note: US/Canadian peak in 1976)	–	–	–	85	–	–	–	62	x	Aqualung
1971	"Hymn 43"	–	–	–	86	–	–	–	91	x	Aqualung
1971	"Aqualung" (Note: released in Italy)	–	–	–	–	–	–	–	–	x	Aqualung
1972	"Thick as a Brick" (part I) (Note: released in Europe)	–	–	44	–	–	–	–	–	x	Thick as a Brick
1972	"Living in the Past" (re-release)	–	36	25	16	–	–	–	11	x	Living in the Past
1973	"A Passion Play" (Edit #8)	–	–	–	–	50	–	–	80	x	A Passion Play
1973	"A Passion Play" (Edit #10) (Note: released in the US/Canada)	–	–	–	–	–	–	–	105	x	A Passion Play
1974	"Bungle in the Jungle"	–	32	–	4	–	–	–	12	x	War Child
1975	"Skating Away on the Thin Ice of the New Day"	–	–	–	–	–	–	–	–	x	War Child
1975	"Minstrel in the Gallery"	–	–	–	–	–	–	–	79	x	Minstrel in the Gallery
1976	"Too Old to Rock N' Roll, Too Young to Die!"	–	–	–	–	–	–	–	–	x	Too Old to Rock N' Roll, Too Young to Die!
1977	"The Whistler"	–	–	–	71	–	–	–	59	x	Songs from the Wood
1977	"Songs from the Wood" (Note: released in Australia and New Zealand)	–	–	–	–	–	–	–	–	x	Songs from the Wood
1978	"Moths"	–	–	–	–	–	–	–	–	x	Heavy Horses
1978	"A Stitch in Time"	–	–	–	–	–	–	–	–	x	non-album single
1978	"Sweet Dream" (live) (Note: released in Germany)	–	–	–	–	–	–	–	–	x	Bursting Out
1979	"Warm Sporran" (Note: released in Germany)	–	–	–	–	–	–	–	–	x	Stormwatch
1979	"North Sea Oil"	–	–	–	–	–	–	–	–	x	Stormwatch
1979	"Home" (Note: released in the US/Canada)	–	–	–	–	–	–	–	–	x	Stormwatch
1980	"Working John, Working Joe" / "Fylingdale Flyer"	–	–	–	–	–	–	–	–	x	A
1982	"Broadsword" (Note: released in Germany)	–	–	–	–	–	–	–	–	–	The Broadsword and the Beast
1982	"Fallen on Hard Times"	–	–	–	–	–	–	–	108	20	The Broadsword and the Beast
1982	"Beastie" / "Pussy Willow" (Note: released in Germany)	–	–	–	–	–	–	–	–	50	The Broadsword and the Beast
1984	"Lap of Luxury"	70	–	–	–	–	–	–	–	30	Under Wraps
1986	"Coronach" (with David Palmer) (Note: released in the UK)	–	–	–	–	–	–	–	–	–	non-album single
1987	"Steel Monkey"	84	–	–	–	–	–	–	–	10	Crest of a Knave
1987	"Farm on the Freeway" [US radio promo]	–	–	–	–	–	–	–	–	7	Crest of a Knave
1987	"Jump Start" [airplay]	–	–	–	–	–	–	–	–	12	Crest of a Knave
1987	"Said She Was a Dancer"	55	–	–	–	–	–	–	–	–	Crest of a Knave
1988	"Part of the Machine"	–	–	–	–	–	–	–	–	10	20 Years of Jethro Tull
1989	"Kissing Willie" [US radio promo]	–	–	–	–	–	–	–	–	6	Rock Island
1989	"Another Christmas Song"	95	–	–	–	–	–	–	–	–	Rock Island
1991	"This Is Not Love"	77	–	–	–	–	–	–	–	14	Catfish Rising
1991	"Still Loving You Tonight"	–	–	–	–	–	–	–	–	–	Catfish Rising
1992	"Rocks on the Road"	47	–	–	–	–	–	–	–	–	Catfish Rising
1993	"Living in the Past" (live)	32	–	–	–	–	–	–	–	–	A Little Light Music
1999	"Bends Like a Willow"	136	–	–	–	–	–	–	–	–	J-Tull Dot Com
"–" denotes releases that did not chart or were not released in that country | "x" denotes that the chart did not exist at the time.

== Videos ==
Title	Details
Slipstream	Released: 18 July 1981; Label: Pacific Arts
20 Years of Jethro Tull	Released: 29 June 1988; Label: Virgin
25th Anniversary Video	Released: 30 April 1994; Label: Fuel 2000
Living with the Past	Released: 30 April 2002; Label: Varèse Sarabande
A New Day Yesterday	Released: 13 January 2004; Label: Chrysalis
Nothing Is Easy: Live at the Isle of Wight 1970	Released: 2 November 2004; Label: Eagle
Live at Montreux 2003	Released: 21 August 2007; Label: Eagle
Jethro Tull Box	Released: 26 October 2007; Label: Eagle
Jack in the Green: Live in Germany 1970–1993	Released: 20 May 2008; Label: Eagle Rock Entertainment
Classic Artists: Jethro Tull – Their Fully Authorised Story	Released: 6 March 2009; Label: Blackhill
Live at AVO Session Basel	Released: 2009; Label: Edel
Live at Madison Square Garden 1978	Released: 31 October 2009; Label: EMI
Around the World Live	Released: 11 June 2013; Label: Eagle Rock Entertainment
