= 50 for 50 =

2018 compilation album by Jethro Tull

Compilation album by Jethro Tull
- Released: 1 June 2018
- Recorded: 1968–2003
- Genres: Progressive rock; hard rock; folk rock; blues rock
- Length: 220:15
- Labels: Parlophone; Chrysalis

Jethro Tull chronology
Live at Carnegie Hall 1970 (2015)	50 for 50 (2018)	The Zealot Gene (2022)

Professional ratings
Review scores
Source	Rating
AllMusic	3.5/5 stars
Classic Rock	4.5/5 stars

50 for 50 is a three-disc compilation album by the English progressive rock band Jethro Tull, released in 2018. Released to commemorate the band's 50th anniversary, the collection includes 50 tracks, selected by frontman Ian Anderson himself, released between 1968 and 2003.

== Track listing ==
All songs written by Ian Anderson, except where noted.

Disc 1
No.	Title	Writer(s)	Place of Origin	Length
1.	"Nothing Is Easy"		Stand Up, 1969	4:24
2.	"Love Story"		Non-album single, 1968	3:03
3.	"Beggar's Farm"	Anderson, Mick Abrahams	This Was, 1968	4:17
4.	"Living in the Past"		Non-album single, 1969	3:22
5.	"A Song for Jeffrey"		This Was, 1968	3:23
6.	"A New Day Yesterday"		Stand Up, 1969	4:08
7.	"The Witch's Promise"		Non-album single, 1970	3:58
8.	"Mother Goose"		Aqualung, 1971	3:52
9.	"With You There To Help Me"		Benefit, 1970	6:18
10.	"Teacher" (US album version)		Benefit (US version), 1970	3:56
11.	"Life Is a Long Song"		Life Is a Long Song EP, 1971	3:18
12.	"Sweet Dream"		Non-album single, 1969	4:03
13.	"Aqualung"		Aqualung, 1971	6:36
14.	"Minstrel in the Gallery" (single edit)		Minstrel in the Gallery, 1975	3:51
15.	"Critique Oblique" (Steven Wilson remix)		A Passion Play, 1973	4:36
16.	"Weathercock"		Heavy Horses, 1978	4:02
17.	"Cross-Eyed Mary"		Aqualung, 1971	4:10
Total length:				71:17

Disc 2
No.	Title	Writer(s)	Place of Origin	Length
1.	"Bourée"	J. S. Bach, arr. by Anderson	Stand Up, 1969	3:45
2.	"Dun Ringill"		Stormwatch, 1979	2:41
3.	"Heavy Horses"		Heavy Horses, 1978	8:54
4.	"Hunting Girl"		Songs from the Wood, 1977	5:11
5.	"Bungle in the Jungle"		War Child, 1974	3:36
6.	"Salamander"		Too Old to Rock 'n' Roll: Too Young to Die!, 1976	2:51
7.	"Pussy Willow"		The Broadsword and the Beast, 1982	3:53
8.	"Too Old to Rock 'n' Roll: Too Young to Die"		Too Old to Rock 'n' Roll: Too Young to Die!, 1976	5:39
9.	"Songs from the Wood"		Songs from the Wood, 1977	4:53
10.	"The Whistler"		Songs from the Wood, 1977	3:31
11.	"Really Don't Mind / See There a Son Is Born"		Thick as a Brick, 1972	5:01
12.	"Moths"		Heavy Horses, 1978	3:24
13.	"One White Duck / 0^{10} = Nothing at All"		Minstrel in the Gallery, 1975	4:36
14.	"Cup of Wonder"		Songs from the Wood, 1977	4:31
15.	"Ring Out Solstice Bells"		The Jethro Tull Christmas Album, 2003	4:05
16.	"Skating Away On the Thin Ice of the New Day"		War Child, 1974	4:11
17.	"A Christmas Song"		The Jethro Tull Christmas Album, 2003	2:49
Total length:				73:31

Disc 3
No.	Title	Writer(s)	Place of Origin	Length
1.	"One Brown Mouse"		Heavy Horses, 1978	3:21
2.	"Rare and Precious Chain"		Roots to Branches, 1995	3:35
3.	"Kissing Willie"		Rock Island, 1989	3:32
4.	"Rocks on the Road"		Catfish Rising, 1991	5:31
5.	"Fylingdale Flyer"		A, 1980	4:33
6.	"Paparazzi"	Anderson, Martin Barre, Peter-John Vettese	Under Wraps, 1984	3:47
7.	"North Sea Oil"		Stormwatch, 1979	3:10
8.	"Steel Monkey"		Crest of a Knave, 1987	3:35
9.	"Black Sunday"		A, 1980	6:35
10.	"European Legacy"		Under Wraps, 1984	3:24
11.	"Budapest"		Crest of a Knave, 1987	10:02
12.	"Broadsword"		The Broadsword and The Beast, 1982	5:02
13.	"Dot Com"		J-Tull Dot Com, 1999	4:26
14.	"Farm on the Freeway"		Crest of a Knave, 1987	6:30
15.	"This Is Not Love"		Catfish Rising, 1991	3:58
16.	"Locomotive Breath"		Aqualung, 1971	4:26
Total length:				75:27

== 50th Anniversary Collection ==
50th Anniversary Collection

Greatest hits album by Jethro Tull
- Released: 1 June 2018
- Recorded: 1968–2003
- Genres: Progressive rock; hard rock; folk rock; blues rock
- Length: 62:48
- Labels: Parlophone; Chrysalis

50th Anniversary Collection is a single-disc greatest hits album by the English progressive rock band Jethro Tull, released in 2018. The album is a summary of 50 for 50, containing the same cover in a different color. The tracklist was selected by Anderson himself.

=== Track listing ===
No.	Title	Length
1.	"Love Story"	3:03
2.	"Living in the Past"	3:22
3.	"Life Is a Long Song"	3:19
4.	"Sweet Dream"	4:03
5.	"The Witch's Promise"	3:51
6.	"Aqualung"	6:37
7.	"Dun Ringill"	2:42
8.	"Cross-Eyed Mary"	4:09
9.	"Bourée"	3:46
10.	"Bungle in the Jungle"	3:36
11.	"Steel Monkey"	3:37
12.	"Too Old to Rock 'n' Roll: Too Young to Die!"	5:40
13.	"Ring Out, Solstice Bells"	4:06
14.	"Farm on the Freeway"	6:31
15.	"Locomotive Breath"	4:26

== Charts ==
Chart information for 50 for 50 only, not 50th Anniversary Collection:

Chart (2018)	Peak position
Austrian Albums (Ö3 Austria)	73
Belgian Albums (Ultratop Flanders)	153
Czech Albums (ČNS IFPI)	32
German Albums (Offizielle Top 100)	48
Hungarian Albums (MAHASZ)	32
Italian Albums (FIMI)	80
Scottish Albums (Official Charts)	30
UK Albums (Official Charts)	73
UK Rock & Metal Albums (Official Charts)	2
US Top Rock Albums (Billboard)	35
