= Living in the Past (album) =

Compilation album by Jethro Tull
- Released: 23 June 1972
- Recorded: July 1968 – May 1971
- Genre: Progressive rock
- Length: 87:28
- Label: Chrysalis
- Producers: Terry Ellis; Ian Anderson; Jethro Tull

Jethro Tull chronology
Thick as a Brick (1972)	Living in the Past (1972)	A Passion Play (1973)

Singles from Living in the Past
- 1. "Living in the Past" Released: October 1972 (US)

Living in the Past is a double LP compilation album by Jethro Tull, released in 1972. It collects album tracks, outtakes and several standalone singles spanning the band's career up to that point. Also included are the 1971 Life Is a Long Song EP and two live recordings taken from a performance at New York City's Carnegie Hall in November 1970.

== Details ==
The album was named after the single released in May 1969 and was released in an elaborate gate-fold packaging that contained a large colour photo booklet with over 50 photos of the band.

Two songs, "By Kind Permission Of" and "Dharma for One", were recorded live at Carnegie Hall in New York City, United States. The former would be extended to include "With You There to Help Me" and would be included in complete form, along with "Dharma for One", on the separate LP release Live at Carnegie Hall 1970 (2015).

"Love Story", "Christmas Song", "Living in the Past", "Driving Song", "Sweet Dream" and "The Witch's Promise", some of which had only appeared on mono versions before, were given new stereo mixes for inclusion on the album. Additionally, "A Song for Jeffrey" and "Teacher" were also remixed. Many of the tracks only appeared as British releases before being compiled on Living in the Past for the first time in the American market. Spurred on by radio airplay of the single, "Living in the Past", US rock fans who bought the album were treated to three years of UK releases.

In the United States, Living in the Past was the first Jethro Tull album to appear on the Chrysalis Records label; while each of the band's previous albums were marked as "a Chrysalis Production", the albums were released by Warner Bros. Records' Reprise Records subsidiary. Early U.S. editions of Living in the Past bore both a Chrysalis catalogue number (2CH 1035) and a Reprise catalogue number (2TS 2106), suggesting that the album was scheduled to appear on Reprise Records but that Chrysalis gained control of the band's USA releases in late 1972.

All of the tracks that were not on the original This Was (1968), Stand Up (1969) and Benefit (1970) albums have appeared as bonus tracks on their 2001 Digital Remasters.

== Critical reception ==
Professional ratings
Review scores
Source	Rating
AllMusic	4.5/5 stars
The Encyclopedia of Popular Music	4/5 stars
The Rolling Stone Record Guide	5/5 stars
Rolling Stone (1973)	(favourable)
Sounds	(favourable)

AllMusic review the collection positively, stating that: "Not only was Ian Anderson writing solid songs every time out, but the group's rhythm section was about the best in progressive rock's pop division. Along with any of the group's first five albums, this collection is seminal and essential to any Tull collection, and the only compilation by the group that is a must-own disc."

=== Charts ===
The album peaked at No. 3 on the Billboard 200 charts and went gold not long after its release. The title track from the album became Tull's first top-40 hit in the United States, reaching No. 11, a full three years after it performed well in Britain. In UK, the album reached No. 13. In Norwegian charts, the album hit No. 5.

== Differences in US version ==
The US vinyl version has "Alive and Well and Living In" and "Hymn 43" in place of "Inside" and "Locomotive Breath". This was the first release of "Alive and Well and Living In" in the US, as it had not been included on the US release of Benefit.

== Track listing ==
=== Original vinyl versions ===
==== UK vinyl ====
All tracks are written by Ian Anderson except when noted.

Side one
No.	Title	Length
1.	"A Song for Jeffrey" (remix of album track from This Was)	3:18
2.	"Love Story" (stereo remix of 1968 UK single)	3:00
3.	"Christmas Song" (stereo remix of 1968 UK single)	2:56
4.	"Living in the Past" (stereo remix of 1969 UK single)	3:18
5.	"Driving Song" (stereo remix of 1969 UK single)	2:37
6.	"Bourée" (Bourrée in E minor by Bach arr. Jethro Tull) (from the album Stand Up)	3:40

Side two
No.	Title	Length
1.	"Sweet Dream" (stereo remix of 1969 UK single)	4:00
2.	"Singing All Day" (previously unreleased, recorded in 1969)	3:03
3.	"The Witch's Promise" (stereo remix of 1970 UK single)	3:48
4.	"Teacher" (remix of track from the US version of Benefit)	4:06
5.	"Inside" (from the album Benefit)	3:42
6.	"Just Trying to Be" (previously unreleased, recorded in 1970)	1:34

Side three – recorded live at Carnegie Hall in New York City for the benefit of Phoenix House, 4 November 1970
No.	Title	Length
1.	"By Kind Permission Of" (instrumental – John Evan, previously unreleased)	10:07
2.	"Dharma for One" (Anderson/Clive Bunker, previously unreleased)	9:55

Side four
No.	Title	Length
1.	"Wond'ring Again" (previously unreleased, recorded in 1970, the second part of the first version of "Wond'ring Aloud", see the tracklist of Aqualung 40th anniversary adapted edition, particularly CD 2, Steven Wilson remaster of associated recordings 1970–1971)	4:11
2.	"Locomotive Breath" (from the album Aqualung)	4:24
3.	"Life Is a Long Song" (from 1971 UK EP)	3:17
4.	"Up the 'Pool" (from 1971 Life Is a Long Song UK EP)	3:09
5.	"Dr. Bogenbroom" (from 1971 Life Is a Long Song UK EP)	2:58
6.	"From Later" (instrumental, from 1971 Life Is a Long Song UK EP)	2:06
7.	"Nursie" (from 1971 'Life Is A Long Song' UK EP)	1:35

- Some pressings of this album erroneously list "From Later" as "For Later". However, it is listed correctly as "From Later" on both the Life Is a Long Song EP and on the Aqualung 40th Anniversary Special Edition.

==== US vinyl ====
Side one
No.	Title	Length
1.	"A Song for Jeffrey" (from the album This Was)	3:17
2.	"Love Story" (1968 UK single)	3:03
3.	"Christmas Song" (1968 UK single)	3:04
4.	"Living in the Past" (1969 UK single)	3:18
5.	"Driving Song" (1969 UK single)	2:37
6.	"Bourée" (Bourrée in E minor by Bach arr. Jethro Tull) (from the album Stand Up)	3:40

Side two
No.	Title	Length
1.	"Sweet Dream" (1969 UK single)	4:02
2.	"Singing All Day" (previously unreleased, recorded in 1969)	3:04
3.	"Teacher" (from the US version of Benefit)	4:07
4.	"The Witch's Promise" (1970 UK single)	3:50
5.	"Alive and Well and Living In" (from the UK version of Benefit)	2:45
6.	"Just Trying to Be" (previously unreleased, recorded in 1970)	1:35

Side three – recorded live at Carnegie Hall in New York City for the benefit of Phoenix House, 4 November 1970
No.	Title	Length
1.	"By Kind Permission Of" (instrumental – John Evan, previously unreleased)	10:07
2.	"Dharma for One" (Anderson/Clive Bunker, previously unreleased)	9:55

Side four
No.	Title	Length
1.	"Wond'ring Again" (previously unreleased, recorded in 1970, early version of "Wond'ring Aloud")	4:11
2.	"Hymn 43" (from the album Aqualung)	3:16
3.	"Life Is a Long Song" (from 1971 UK EP)	3:18
4.	"Up the 'Pool" (from 1971 Life Is a Long Song UK EP)	3:10
5.	"Dr. Bogenbroom" (from 1971 Life Is a Long Song UK EP)	2:59
6.	"From Later" (instrumental, from 1971 Life Is a Long Song UK EP)	2:06
7.	"Nursie" (from 1971 Life Is a Long Song UK EP)	1:35

=== CD releases ===
Differences in the song selections between the US and the UK editions of the album resulted in different track listings for the various CD releases. Most CDs had to further alter the track listings, due to time constraints as CDs at the time could only hold up to 74 minutes of music. Since the original American CD edition of Benefit was released with the alternative track list omitting "Alive and Well and Living In", many of the US CD editions of Living in the Past add that track. All of the single CD reissues omit two songs ("Bourée" and "Teacher") in order to reduce the running time to fit the album on one disc, but both countries' versions include "Inside", which originally was only on the UK vinyl. A 1997 two-disc Mobile Fidelity Sound Lab reissue contains every song selected for the UK and US vinyl editions.

On the 11th July 2025 came the Expanded Edition Still Living in the Past - a 5CD/1BD Set which features Stereo and Surround mixes of the compilation plus Live at Carnegie Hall 1970 in its entirety, also remixed by Steven Wilson. Many previous Wilson remixes were presented in past Anniversary Edition sets (many of listed under Associated Recordings) hence the year of the remixes listed below.

==== UK single-disc reissue ====
CD - (Chrysalis UK 1990, F2-21575)
No.	Title	Length
1.	"A Song for Jeffrey"	3:20
2.	"Love Story"	3:02
3.	"Christmas Song"	3:05
4.	"Living in the Past"	3:20
5.	"Driving Song"	2:39
6.	"Sweet Dream"	4:02
7.	"Singing All Day"	3:03
8.	"The Witch's Promise"	3:49
9.	"Inside"	3:49
10.	"Just Trying to Be"	1:36
11.	"By Kind Permission Of" (live at the Carnegie Hall – John Evan)	10:11
12.	"Dharma for One" (live at the Carnegie Hall – Anderson/Clive Bunker)	9:45
13.	"Wond'ring Again"	4:12
14.	"Locomotive Breath"	4:24
15.	"Life Is a Long Song"	3:18
16.	"Up the 'Pool"	3:10
17.	"Dr. Bogenbroom"	2:59
18.	"From Later"	2:06
19.	"Nursie"	1:38

- Omits "Bourée" and "Teacher" from the UK vinyl version.

==== American single-disc reissue ====
CD - (Chrysalis US 1992, 0946 3 21035 2 9/F2-21035)
No.	Title	Length
1.	"A Song for Jeffrey"	3:20
2.	"Love Story"	3:02
3.	"Christmas Song"	3:05
4.	"Living in the Past"	3:20
5.	"Driving Song"	2:39
6.	"Sweet Dream"	4:02
7.	"Singing All Day"	3:03
8.	"The Witch's Promise"	3:49
9.	"Inside"	3:49
10.	"Alive and Well and Living In"	2:48
11.	"Just Trying to Be"	1:36
12.	"By Kind Permission Of" (live at the Carnegie Hall – John Evan)	10:11
13.	"Dharma for One" (live at the Carnegie Hall – Anderson/Clive Bunker)	9:45
14.	"Wond'ring Again"	4:12
15.	"Hymn 43"	3:17
16.	"Life Is a Long Song"	3:18
17.	"Up the 'Pool"	3:10
18.	"Dr. Bogenbroom"	2:59
19.	"From Later"	2:06
20.	"Nursie"	1:38

- Same track list as the UK single-disc re-issue but with additional track "Alive and Well and Living In", and "Locomotive Breath" is replaced by "Hymn 43".

==== Mobile Fidelity Sound Lab edition (UDCD 2-708, 1997 remaster) ====
Disc one
No.	Title	Length
1.	"A Song for Jeffrey"	3:20
2.	"Love Story"	3:02
3.	"Christmas Song"	3:05
4.	"Living in the Past"	3:20
5.	"Driving Song"	2:39
6.	"Bourée"	3:43
7.	"Sweet Dream"	4:02
8.	"Singing All Day"	3:03
9.	"Teacher"	4:08
10.	"The Witch's Promise"	3:49
11.	"Inside"	3:45
12.	"Alive and Well and Living In"	2:45
13.	"Just Trying to Be"	1:36

Disc two
No.	Title	Length
1.	"By Kind Permission Of" (live at Carnegie Hall – John Evan)	10:11
2.	"Dharma for One" (live at Carnegie Hall – Anderson/Clive Bunker)	9:45
3.	"Wond'ring Again"	4:12
4.	"Hymn 43"	3:17
5.	"Locomotive Breath"	4:24
6.	"Life Is a Long Song"	3:18
7.	"Up the 'Pool"	3:10
8.	"Dr. Bogenbroom"	2:59
9.	"From Later"	2:06
10.	"Nursie"	1:38

- This release contains all of the songs released on the UK and US versions of the album.

==== Still Living in the Past - (Chrysalis 5021732368409) Released 11 July 2025 ====
CD1: Original Mixes, Remixes, Edits & Demos 1968–1971
No.	Title	Length
1.	"A Song for Jeffrey (1971 Remix)"	3:21
2.	"Love Story (1971 Remix)"	3:03
3.	"A Christmas Song (1971 Remix)"	3:04
4.	"Living in the Past (1971 Remix)"	3:21
5.	"Driving Song (1971 Remix)"	2:40
6.	"Sweet Dream (1971 Remix)"	4:02
7.	"Singing All Day (1971 Remix)"	3:04
8.	"Teacher [US Album Version] (1971 Remix)"	4:09
9.	"Inside (1969 Stereo Mix – Previously Unreleased)"	5:05
10.	"My God [Early Version] (1970 Master Mix– Previously Unreleased)"	9:06
11.	"Just Trying to Be (1970 Master Mix)"	1:36
12.	"Wond’ring Aloud Again [Demo] (1970 Mono Demo – Previously Unreleased)"	7:11
13.	"Wond’ring Again (1970 Master Mix)"	4:13
14.	"Lick Your Fingers Clean (1970 Stereo Mix – Previously Unreleased)"	2:51
15.	"Locomotive Breath (1971 US Single DJ Edit)"	3:07
16.	"Life Is a Long Song (1971 Master Mix)"	3:19
17.	"Up the ’Pool (1971 Master Mix)"	3:11
18.	"From Later (1971 Alternative Master Mix – Previously Unreleased)"	2:10
19.	"Life Is a Long Song (1971 Alternative Master Mix – Previously Unreleased)"	2:10

CD2: Steven Wilson Mix [Sides 1 & 2] except*
No.	Title	Length
1.	"A Song for Jeffrey (2025 Remix – Previously Unreleased)"	3:21
2.	"One for John Gee (2025 Remix – Previously Unreleased)"	2:05
3.	"Love Story (2025 Remix – Previously Unreleased)"	3:03
4.	"A Christmas Song (2018 Remix)"	3:06
5.	"Living in the Past (2016 Remix)"	3:24
6.	"Driving Song (2016 Remix)"	3:24
7.	"Bourée (2016 Remix)"	3:49
8.	"Fat Man (2016 Remix)"	2:51
9.	"Singing All Day (2013 Remix)"	3:08
10.	"Sweet Dream (2013 Remix)"	4:05
11.	"17 (2013 Edited Remix – Previously Unreleased)"	3:08
12.	"Teacher (UK Single Version, 2025 Remix – Previously Unreleased)"	4:56
13.	"The Witch's Promise* (1971 Remix)"	3:51
14.	"Teacher [US Album Version] (2025 Remix – Previously Unreleased)"	4:02
15.	"Inside (2013 Remix)"	3:51
16.	"Alive and Well and Living In (2013 Remix)"	2:47
17.	"Just Trying to Be (2011 Remix)"	1:39

CD3: Steven Wilson Mix [Sides 3 & 4] except*
No.	Title	Length
1.	"By Kind Permission Of [Live] (2025 Remix – Previously Unreleased)"	10:13
2.	"Dharma for One (Live 2025 Remix – Previously Unreleased)"	9:56
3.	"Wond’ring Aloud (Early version, 2011 Remix)"	2:51
4.	"Wond’ring Again (2011 Remix)"	4:16
5.	"Lick Your Fingers Clean (2025 Remix – Previously Unreleased)"	2:53
6.	"Up to Me (2011 Remix)"	3:14
7.	"Hymn 43 (2011 Remix)"	3:17
8.	"Locomotive Breath (2025 Remix – Previously Unreleased)"	4:42
9.	"Life Is a Long Song (2011 Remix)"	3:19
10.	"Up the ’Pool (2011 Remix)"	3:12
11.	"Dr. Bogenbroom* (1971 Master Mix)"	3:00
12.	"From Later* (1971 Master Mix)"	2:08
13.	"Nursie* (1971 Master Mix)"	1:36
14.	"Locomotive Breath (Unplugged 2025 Remix – Previously Unreleased)"	3:24

CD4: Live at Carnegie Hall, November 4, 1970 (Part 1 – 2025 Remix)
No.	Title	Length
1.	"Introduction to Nothing Is Easy"	2:22
2.	"Nothing Is Easy"	6:02
3.	"Introduction to My God"	1:52
4.	"My God"	12:54
5.	"Introduction to With You There to Help Me"	2:18
6.	"With You There to Help Me / By Kind Permission Of"	13:07
7.	"Introduction to A Song for Jeffrey"	2:06
8.	"A Song for Jeffrey"	4:58
9.	"Introduction to To Cry You a Song"	0:50
10.	"To Cry You a Song"	5:40

CD5: Live at Carnegie Hall, November 4, 1970 (Part 2 – 2025 Remix)
No.	Title	Length
1.	"Introduction to Sossity; You’re a Woman"	2:51
2.	"Sossity; You’re a Woman (including Reasons for Waiting)"	5:36
3.	"Introduction to Dharma for One"	1:36
4.	"Dharma for One"	21:31
5.	"Introduction to We Used to Know"	2:29
6.	"We Used to Know"	3:18
7.	"Guitar Solo"	8:33
8.	"For a Thousand Mothers"	4:56

- Bluray contains Steven Wilson's Remixes of Still Living in the Past and Live at Carnegie Hall 1970 in High Resolution 24/96 PCM Stereo and DTS HD 5.1 Surround, along with a Flat Transfer of the original 1972 Living in the Past album with combined US & UK Reels - also in High Resolution 24/96 PCM Stereo. 7 Bonus Unreleased Tracks from CD1 also presented in High Resolution Flat Transfers. Promo Films of "The Witch's Promise", US & UK Versions of "Teacher" and "Life Is a Long Song" also included.

== Personnel ==
Jethro Tull

- Ian Anderson – vocals, flute, mandolin, tin whistle, electric guitar (12 string (on "Sweet Dream"), acoustic guitar (on "Just Trying to Be", "Wond'ring Again", "Life Is a Long Song", "Up the 'Pool" and "Dr. Bogenbroom"), balalaika; Hammond organ (on "Living in the Past", "Singing All Day"), violin (on "Up the 'Pool')
- Mick Abrahams – electric guitar (on "A Song for Jeffrey" and "Love Story")
- Martin Barre – electric guitar, acoustic guitar (on "The Witch's Promise" and "Life Is a Long Song"), backing vocals and additional percussion (on "Dharma for One")
- John Evan – piano, Hammond organ, Mellotron, harpsichord, celeste, backing vocals and additional percussion (on "Dharma for One")
- Glenn Cornick – bass guitar; Hammond organ (on "Singing All Day")
- Jeffrey Hammond (as Jeffrey Hammond-Hammond) – bass guitar (on "Hymn 43", "Locomotive Breath", "Life Is a Long Song", "Up the 'Pool", "Dr. Bogenbroom" and "From Later")
- Clive Bunker – drums, percussion, backing vocals (on "Dharma for One")
- Barriemore Barlow – drums (on "Life Is a Long Song", "Up the 'Pool", "Dr. Bogenbroom" and "From Later")

Additional personnel

- Dee Palmer – string and orchestra conductor arrangements (on "Christmas Song" and "Sweet Dream")
- Lou Toby – string arrangement and conductor (on "Living in the Past")
- Andy Johns – sound engineering

== Charts ==
=== Weekly charts ===
Chart (1972)	Peak position
Australian Albums (Kent Music Report)	2
Canada Top Albums/CDs (RPM)	1
Finnish Albums (The Official Finnish Charts)	6
German Albums (Offizielle Top 100)	8
Italian Albums (Musica e Dischi)	4
Norwegian Albums (VG-lista)	5
UK Albums (Official Charts)	8
US Billboard 200	3

Chart (2025)	Peak position
Hungarian Albums (MAHASZ)	38

=== Year-end charts ===
Chart (1972)	Position
German Albums (Offizielle Top 100)	37

== Certifications ==
Region	Certification	Certified units/sales
United Kingdom (BPI) 1990 release	Silver	60,000^{‡}
United States (RIAA)	Gold	500,000^{^}
^{^} Shipments figures based on certification alone.^{‡} Sales+streaming figures based on certification alone.

== See also ==
- Jethro Tull discography
- Living with the Past, 2002 live album
