= 25th Anniversary Box Set =

Box set by Jethro Tull
- Released: 26 April 1993
- Recorded: 1969–92
- Genre: Rock
- Length: 286:24
- Label: EMI
- Producer: Ian Anderson

Jethro Tull chronology
A Little Light Music (1992)	25th Anniversary Box Set (1993)	The Best of Jethro Tull – The Anniversary Collection (1993)

Professional ratings
Review scores
Source	Rating
The Encyclopedia of Popular Music	4/5 stars

25th Anniversary Box Set is a 1993 limited edition box set by Jethro Tull. It includes some of the band's best-known compositions from 1969 to 1992, many of them previously unavailable in the versions presented here. It was the second Jethro Tull box-set in five years, the first being the three CD/ five LP/ three Cassette 20 Years of Jethro Tull.

== Four CDs ==
The CDs are housed in a mock cigar box, along with a booklet featuring extensive notes and photographs, sealed with a label bearing an image of Ian Anderson.

The four CDs are:

- Remixed Classic Songs: remixes some older tracks (77:06)
- Carnegie Hall, N.Y., Recorded Live New York City 1970: benefit concert for Phoenix House to rehabilitate drug abusers. This CD omits "By Kind Permission Of" and "Dharma For One", due to CD time constraints. Both can be found on the Living In The Past compilation. (60:28)
- The Beacons Bottom Tapes: new recordings, mostly of older tracks (71:07)
- Pot Pourri, Live Across The World & Through The Years: live (1969–1992) (77:43)

== Track listing ==
=== Disc One: Remixed Classic Songs ===
1. "My Sunday Feeling"
2. "A Song for Jeffrey"
3. "Living in the Past"
4. "Teacher"
5. "Sweet Dream"
6. "Cross-Eyed Mary"
7. "The Witch's Promise"
8. "Life Is a Long Song"
9. "Bungle in the Jungle"
10. "Minstrel in the Gallery"
11. "Cold Wind to Valhalla"
12. "Too Old to Rock 'n' Roll: Too Young to Die!"
13. "Songs from the Wood"
14. "Heavy Horses"
15. "Black Sunday"
16. "Broadsword"

=== Disc Two: Carnegie Hall, New York City, New York, 1970 ===
1. "Nothing Is Easy"
2. "My God"
3. "With You There to Help Me"
4. "A Song for Jeffrey"
5. "To Cry You a Song"
6. "Sossity: You're a Woman"
7. "Reasons for Waiting"
8. "We Used to Know"
9. "Guitar Solo"
10. "For a Thousand Mothers"

=== Disc Three: The Beacons Bottom Tapes ===
1. "So Much Trouble"
2. "My Sunday Feeling"
3. "Some Day the Sun Won't Shine for You"
4. "Living in the Past"
5. "Bourée" (Instrumental)
6. "With You There to Help Me"
7. "Thick as a Brick"
8. "Cheerio"
9. "A New Day Yesterday"
10. "Protect and Survive" (Instrumental)
11. "Jack-A-Lynn"
12. "The Whistler" (Instrumental)
13. "My God"
14. "Aqualung"

=== Disc Four: Pot Pourri Live Across the World & Through the Years ===
1. "To Be Sad Is a Mad Way to Be" (Recorded at Stockholm Concert Hall, Stockholm, Sweden – 9 January 1969)
2. "Back to the Family" (Recorded at Stockholm Concert Hall, Stockholm, Sweden – 9 January 1969)
3. "A Passion Play (Extract)" (Recorded at Palais des Sports, Paris, France – 5 July 1975)
4. "Wind-Up/Locomotive Breath/Land of Hope and Glory" (Recorded at Golders Green Hippodrome, London, England – 2 February 1977)
5. "Seal Driver" (Recorded at Congress Centrum, Hamburg, Germany – 8 April 1982)
6. "Nobody's Car" (Recorded at Hammersmith Apollo, London, England – 9 September 1984)
7. "Pussy Willow" (Recorded at Hammersmith Apollo, London, England – 9 September 1984)
8. "Budapest" (Recorded at Leysin Festival, Leysin, Switzerland – 10 July 1991)
9. "Nothing Is Easy" (Recorded at Leysin Festival, Leysin, Switzerland – 10 July 1991)
10. "Kissing Willie" (Recorded at Tallinn Festival, Tallinn, Estonia – 20 July 1991)
11. "Still Loving You Tonight" (Recorded at Hammersmith Apollo, London, England – 8 October 1991)
12. "Beggar's Farm" (Recorded at Beasley Theater Quad, Pullman, Washington – 24 October 1992)
13. "Passion Jig" (Instrumental) (Recorded at Riviera Theater, Chicago, Illinois – 10 October 1992)
14. "A Song for Jeffrey" (Recorded at Riviera Theater, Chicago, Illinois – 11 October 1992)
15. "Living in the Past" (Recorded at Theatre St. Denis, Montreal, Quebec, Canada – 9 November 1992)

== Charts ==
Chart (1993–1994)	Peak position
Australian Albums (ARIA)	174
