= Live at Carnegie Hall 1970 =

Live album by Jethro Tull
- Released: 18 April 2015
- Recorded: 4 November 1970
- Genres: Progressive rock; blues rock; folk rock
- Label: Parlophone/WEA

Jethro Tull chronology
Around the World Live (Jethro Tull) (2013)	Live at Carnegie Hall 1970 (2015)	50 For 50 (2018)

Live at Carnegie Hall 1970 is a live album by Jethro Tull released in 2015. Recorded on 4 November 1970 at Carnegie Hall, New York City, it was released in vinyl LP on 18 April 2015, for Record Store Day.

The album consists of a heavily-edited version of the complete show, previously issued partially on side 3 of Living in the Past , on the 2010 Collector's Edition of Stand Up, Disc 2 of the 25th Anniversary Box Set and as of 11 July 2025, on CD's 4 & 5 of the Expanded Still Living in the Past compilation remixed by Steven Wilson.

== Track listing ==
=== Disc 1 ===
Side One

1. "Nothing Is Easy" - 5:34
2. "My God" - 12:43

Side Two

1. "With You There To Help Me/By Kind Permission Of" - 13:34
2. "A Song for Jeffrey" - 5:25

=== Disc 2 ===
Side One

1. "To Cry You A Song" - 6:03
2. "Sossity, You're A Woman"/"Reasons For Waiting"/"Sossity, You're A Woman" - 5:28
3. "Dharma For One" (Ian Anderson/Clive Bunker) - 13:37

Side Two

1. "We Used To Know" - 3:41
2. "Guitar Solo" - 8:25
3. "For A Thousand Mothers" - 4:43

== Track listing ==
=== Disc 4: Live at Carnegie Hall, November 4, 1970 (Part 1 – 2025 Remix) ===
1. "Introduction to Nothing Is Easy" - 2:22
2. "Nothing Is Easy" - 6:02
3. "Introduction to My God" - 1:52
4. "My God" - 12:54
5. "Introduction to With You There to Help Me" - 2:18
6. "With You There to Help Me / By Kind Permission Of" - 13:07
7. "Introduction to A Song for Jeffrey" - 2:06
8. "A Song for Jeffrey" - 4:58
9. "Introduction to To Cry You a Song" - 0:50
10. "To Cry You a Song" - 5:40

=== Disc 5: Live at Carnegie Hall, November 4, 1970 (Part 2 – 2025 Remix) ===
1. "Introduction to Sossity; You’re a Woman" - 2:51
2. "Sossity; You’re a Woman (including Reasons for Waiting)" - 5:36
3. "Introduction to Dharma for One" - 1:36
4. "Dharma for One" - 21:31
5. "Introduction to We Used to Know" - 2:29
6. "We Used to Know" - 3:18
7. "Guitar Solo" - 8:33
8. "For a Thousand Mothers" - 4:56

== Personnel ==
- Ian Anderson – acoustic guitar, flute, vocals
- Glenn Cornick – bass
- Clive Bunker – drums
- Martin Barre – guitars
- John Evan – keyboards

== Reception ==
In 1993, Alan Niester wrote in The Globe and Mail that although the album "comes across as a particularly well-recorded bootleg", because "it was recorded just prior to the band's more flowery Aqualung period, it shows off the original Tull quartet at the height of its jazz/rhythm and blues powers".

== See also ==
- Nothing Is Easy: Live at the Isle of Wight 1970
