= The Witch's Promise =

Single by Jethro Tull
- B-side: "Teacher"
- Released: 16 January 1970
- Recorded: 19 December 1969
- Studio: Morgan Studios, London
- Genre: Folk rock; freak folk
- Length: 3:48
- Label: Chrysalis
- Songwriter: Ian Anderson
- Producers: Ian Anderson, Terry Ellis

Jethro Tull singles chronology
"Sweet Dream" (1969)	"The Witch's Promise" (1970)	"Inside" (1970)

"The Witch's Promise" is a song by British rock band Jethro Tull, released as a single in January 1970, on the Chrysalis label. It reached No. 4 on the UK Singles Chart, and was promoted by an appearance on the British chart show Top of the Pops. The B-side was an alternate version of "Teacher", which later appeared on the US release of the album Benefit. In the U.S., the single was released on the Reprise label.

== Background ==
The song was recorded at Morgan Studios, London, on 19 December 1969. It was intended to be a follow-up to the band's two previous singles, "Living in the Past" and "Sweet Dream", which had been top ten hits. Musically, it developed from the style heard on the group's previous album, Stand Up, discarding the blues influences that the band had started with, and steered towards folk.

Record World said that "Jethro Tull sounds strangely like a medieval Scottish troubador" and called "Ian Anderson's flute and vocal both excellent."

The single was the first recording to feature keyboardist John Evan, who would be an important member of Jethro Tull throughout the 1970s. He was sharing a flat with singer Ian Anderson at the time, and agreed to perform as a session musician. He played Hammond organ on "Teacher" and both piano and Mellotron on "The Witch's Promise". This led to an offer to join the band full-time. The track is one of the few recorded by Jethro Tull to feature the Mellotron, a tape replay keyboard that could emulate a string section, and the only single released by the band to feature the instrument.

"The Witch's Promise" was intended to be the last stand-alone single from the band that was not taken from an LP. Anderson said the band would issue singles from future albums in order to gain radio play, but he was not particularly interested in promoting them.

The song appeared as a remixed version on both the UK and US releases of the compilation album Living in the Past (1972).

== Personnel ==
- Ian Anderson – vocals, flute
- Martin Barre – guitar
- Glenn Cornick – bass
- Clive Bunker – drums

Additional personnel

- John Evan – piano, Mellotron
