= Billy Connolly Bites Yer Bum! =

Produced by Terry Ellis for Chrysalis Records and directed by David Mallet . Billy Connolly Bites Yer Bum! is a recording of a February 1981 performance by comedian Billy Connolly, filmed during a run of two weeks at Apollo Victoria Theatre, London. It was the culmination of a marathon British tour which started in August 1980. He opens with observational material about this time touring internationally, particularly in Australia and Los Angeles. He performs several lyrical pieces featuring guitar and autoharp. The video concludes with the rear curtain raising to introduce a support band Billy introduces as "Doner and the kebabs". Billy plays Banjo, then performs solely as a singer in an act combining vocals with spoken word, at one point beating himself with a leather whip.
