= Sunshine Day =

Single by Jethro Toe (Tull)
- B-side: "Aeroplane"
- Released: 16 February 1968
- Recorded: 6–7 January 1968 / 22 October 1967
- Studio: CBS Studios, London, UK / EMI Studios, London, UK
- Genre: Blues rock
- Length: 2:26
- Label: MGM 1384
- Songwriter(s): Mick Abrahams
- Producer(s): Derek Lawrence; engineer Mike Ross

Jethro Toe (Tull) singles chronology
"Sunshine Day" (1968)	"A Song for Jeffrey" (1968)

"Sunshine Day" is a song recorded by British progressive rock group Jethro Tull. It was released as the A-side of the group's debut single, and was recorded on 6–7 January 1968 at CBS Studios in London. The single released on 16 February 1968 by MGM Records, in the UK only. The B-side, "Aeroplane", was recorded on 22 October 1967 at EMI Studios, London, under the artist name "John Evan Band". Both tracks were produced by Derek Lawrence, who is also credited with purposely designating the band as 'Jethro Toe'. Apparently, he did not like the name 'Jethro Tull'.

"Sunshine Day" was written by Mick Abrahams, who joined the band in late 1967. The composers of "Aeroplane" were Ian Anderson and "Len Barnard", the latter a pseudonym for Tull bass player Glenn Cornick (born Glenn Douglas Barnard Cornick). The release sold close to one hundred copies, mostly to friends and relatives. Jethro Tull began recording their first album, This Was, in June 1968.

== Personnel ==
Jethro Tull (credited as 'Jethro Toe')

- Ian Anderson – lead vocals
- Glenn Cornick – bass guitar
- Mick Abrahams – vocals, guitar
- Clive Bunker – drums

Additional personnel

- Derek Lawrence - producer
- Mike Ross - engineer

== Recorded appearances ==
- Rare Tracks (1975)
- 20 Years of Jethro Tull (1988)
- 25 Very Rare Masters from the Sixties (1996)
- 1968: The Soundtrack (2004)
- Real Life Permanent Dreams: A Cornucopia of British Psychedlia 1965–1970 (2007)
- Spirit of Joy: Tales from the Polydor Underground 1967–1974 (2008)
