= Love Story (Jethro Tull song) =

- Picture sleeve (Fontana, Germany)

Single by Jethro Tull
- B-side: "Christmas Song"
- Released: 29 November 1968
- Recorded: 30 October 1968
- Studio: Morgan Studios, London, UK
- Genre: Blues rock, hard rock
- Length: 3:02
- Label: Island WIP 6048 Fontana; Reprise
- Songwriter: Ian Anderson
- Producers: Ian Anderson, Terry Ellis

Jethro Tull singles chronology
"A Song for Jeffrey" (1968)	"Love Story" (1968)	"Living in the Past" (1969)

"Love Story" is the third single by British rock band Jethro Tull. It was released in late November 1968. It reached No. 29 on the UK Singles Chart in January 1969, spending eight weeks on that chart.

The original UK single was released on 29 November 1968 with the B-side "Christmas Song". In the U.S., "Love Story" was released on 12 February 1969, with "A Song for Jeffrey" on the B-side. Record World said that the band "[lays] down a hard beat." "Love Story" and "Christmas Song" did not appear on an album until the 1972 compilation Living in the Past, but "A Song for Jeffrey" did appear on the band's first album, This Was (1968).

== Personnel ==
Jethro Tull

- Ian Anderson – flute, mandolin, lead vocals
- Mick Abrahams – wah-wah guitar
- Glenn Cornick – bass guitar
- Clive Bunker – drums

Additional personnel

- Terry Ellis - producer

== See also ==
- Jethro Tull: This Was (1968)
