= A Little Light Music =

1992 live album by Jethro Tull

Live album by Jethro Tull
- Released: 14 September 1992
- Recorded: 2–23 May 1992
- Genre: Rock
- Length: 77:20
- Label: Chrysalis
- Producer: Ian Anderson

Jethro Tull chronology
Catfish Rising (1991)	A Little Light Music (1992)	25th Anniversary Box Set (1993)

Professional ratings
Review scores
Source	Rating
Allmusic	2/5 stars
The Encyclopedia of Popular Music	2/5 stars

A Little Light Music is a Jethro Tull live album. All songs were recorded during a semi-acoustic European tour in May 1992. Greek singer George Dalaras participates and sings a duet with Ian Anderson in the song "John Barleycorn" on the Italian version of the album only, the worldwide version has a re-recorded vocal by Ian Anderson.

== Track listing ==
1. "Someday the Sun Won't Shine for You" (Athens, 13/14 May 1992) – 3:59
2. "Living in the Past" , instrumental (London, 2 May 1992) – 5:06
3. "Life Is a Long Song" (Frankfurt, 12 May 1992) – 3:36
4. "Rocks on the Road" (Caesarea, 23 May 1992) – 7:03
5. "Under Wraps" , (Instrumental) (Zurich, 6/7 May 1992) – 2:29
6. "Nursie" (Mannheim, 5 May 1992) – 2:27
7. "Too Old to Rock 'n' Roll: Too Young to Die" (Ankara, 16 May 1992) – 4:43
8. "One White Duck" (Prague, 10 May 1992) – 3:15
9. "A New Day Yesterday" (Graz, 9 May 1992) – 7:33
10. "John Barleycorn" (Athens, 13/14 May 1992) – 6:34
11. "Look into the Sun" , instrumental (Caesarea, 23 May 1992) – 3:45
12. "A Christmas Song" (Caesarea, 23 May 1992) – 3:45
13. "From a Dead Beat to an Old Greaser" (Munich, 7 May 1992) – 3:49
14. "This Is Not Love" (Caesarea, 23 May 1992) – 3:52
15. "Bourée" , instrumental (Berlin, 11 May 1992) – 6:04
16. "Pussy Willow" , instrumental (Dortmund, 4 May 1992) – 3:30
17. "Locomotive Breath" (Jerusalem, 21 May 1992) – 5:50

== Notes ==
- US version was released on 22 September 1992
- A remastered edition of the album was released in September 2006. It contained no bonus tracks.

== Charts ==
Chart (1992)	Peak position
Australian Albums (ARIA)	181
Swiss Albums (Schweizer Hitparade)	22
UK Albums (OCC)	34
US Billboard 200	150

== Personnel ==
- Ian Anderson – flute, mandolin, harmonica, acoustic guitar, percussion, vocals
- Martin Barre – electric guitar, acoustic guitar
- Dave Pegg – bass, mandolin
- Dave Mattacks – snare drum, bass drum, hi-hat, cymbal, glockenspiel, percussion, keyboard
