= Living in the Past (song) =

1969 single by Jethro Tull

- French picture sleeve

Single by Jethro Tull
- B-side: "Driving Song"
- Released: 2 May 1969 UK; October 1972 US
- Recorded: 3 & 18 March 1969
- Studio: Vantone Sound Studio, West Orange, NJ & United Western Recorders, Los Angeles, CA
- Genre: Progressive rock; jazz fusion
- Length: 3:18
- Label: Island WIP 6056
- Songwriter: Ian Anderson
- Producers: Ian Anderson; Terry Ellis

Jethro Tull singles chronology
"Love Story" (1968)	"Living in the Past" (1969)	"Bourée" (1969)

Official audio
- "Living in the Past" on YouTube

"Living in the Past" is a song by British progressive rock group Jethro Tull. It is one of the band's best-known songs, and it is notable for being written in the unusual 5/4 time signature. According to band frontman Ian Anderson, it was inspired by Dave Brubeck's 1961 jazz instrumental "Take Five".

== Composition and recording ==
Anderson claims to have written the song in approximately one hour in his room at a Holiday Inn 'on the banks of the Charles River,' Boston, Massachusetts, on 12 February 1969. He and his manager, Terry Ellis, were checking in 'a day off here before the show,' ahead of a three-day residency 13 – 15 February 1969 at the Boston Tea Party rock club. When he handed it to Ellis later, he replied, 'Wow! I'll book a studio next week, when we we’re in the New York area.'

At the end of the East Coast leg of their US tour, the backing tracks were recorded at Vantone Sound Studio, West Orange, New Jersey on 3 March 1969 (described by Anderson as a "cheap studio in New Jersey"). Anderson described overdubbing his vocals in San Francisco during mid-March; but conflicting reports identify 18 March at United Western Recorders, Los Angeles, California, as correct. It was also the date "Driving Song" was recorded, released as the b-side of Jethro Tull's fourth single, "Living in the Past", on 2 May 1969 to UK audiences. Meanwhile, the band returned to London in mid-April to begin work on their second album, Stand Up.

After reaching number 3 on the UK Singles Chart, it was released in several other countries, but only promotionally in the United States in July 1969. It was not until October 1972 that it was commercially released in the US, as the lead single and title track of Living in the Past, a double compilation LP of the band's UK-only releases and outtakes recorded from 1968 to 1971. It became the band's first Top 20 hit in the US, peaking at #11. The 1972 version was remixed, replacing a flute overdub with an organ part. In 1993, a remix on the song went to #31 on the US dance chart. In 2001, it was included as a "bonus track" for the CD reissue of Stand Up. A Steven Wilson remix "sympathetic to both the original and later mixes" was included on the 2016 "Elevated Edition" reissue, alongside flat transfers of the original 1969 mono and (promo) stereo mixes.

"Living in the Past" was ranked the fifth best Jethro Tull song by Rock – Das Gesamtwerk der größten Rock-Acts im Check.

Anderson has described the song as a critical reflection of the hippie lifestyle and a general naivete of the era:

Lines like "we'll go walking out while others shout of war's disaster" reflect my rather cynical view of much of the world in the late sixties.

[...] I was never drawn to the fashions, the free love, the drug experiences and the drug culture that people seemed willing to get into. [...]

So when I sang "now there's revolution, but they don't know what they're fighting," I was just saying forget all that stuff, let's stay in a more realistic world with more straightforward values. Not necessarily my personal viewpoint all the time, but as a reaction to that rather trendy pretence at revolution and infatuation with the present, in the sense of living for today and having a good time – something I usually felt a bit awkward about. But I'm a party pooper, you know that.

— Ian Anderson, Jethro Tull: Stand Up – The Elevated Edition, p. 59

== Chart performance ==
=== Weekly charts ===
Chart (1969)	Peak position
France	41
Ireland (IRMA)	5
New Zealand (Listener)	15
UK	3

Chart (1972–73)	Peak position
Australia (Kent Music Report)	36
Canada RPM Top Singles	16
US Billboard Hot 100	11
US Cash Box Top 100	15

=== Year-end charts ===
Chart (1969)	Rank
UK	53

Chart (1973)	Rank
Canada	108
US (Joel Whitburn's Pop Annual)	102

== Release history ==
- Single: "Living in the Past" / "Driving Song" (Island WIP 6056, 2 May 1969)
- Single: "Living in the Past" / "Christmas Song" (USA) (Chrysalis 2006 10 October 1972)
- Single: "Living in the Past" / "Requiem" (Chrysalis CHS 2081, 16 January 1976)
- Single: "Living in the Past" / "Hard Liner" (Chrysalis CHS 3970, 1993)
- Single: "Living in the Past" / "Witch's Promise" / "Teacher" / "Life is a Long Song" (April 2013, limited edition vinyl)

== Personnel ==
=== Jethro Tull ===
- Ian Anderson – flute, lead vocals
- Glenn Cornick – bass guitar
- Martin Barre – guitar
- Clive Bunker – drums, percussion

=== Additional personnel ===
- Lou Toby – arranged and conducted strings

== Cover versions ==
The song was first covered as an instrumental by CCS in 1970. Other cover versions include:

- Billie Davis (1970)
- Maynard Ferguson (1971)
- Midge Ure (1985)
- Cud (band) (1989 - As a B side to "Only (a Prawn in Whitby)" and later on their Rich & Strange: Anthology album)
- Royal Philharmonic Orchestra (1993)
- The Connells (1994)
- Francis Dunnery (1994 – with entirely rewritten lyrics)
- Keith Emerson (1996 – in the tribute album To Cry You A Song – A collection of Tull Tales)

== See also ==
- List of musical works in unusual time signatures
- Nollen, Scott Allen (15 December 2001). Jethro Tull: A History of the Band, 1968–2001. Jefferson, North Carolina: McFarland & Company. p. 44. ISBN 978-0786411016.
