= Bourrée in E minor =

Lute composition by Johann Sebastian Bach; fifth movement of BWV 996

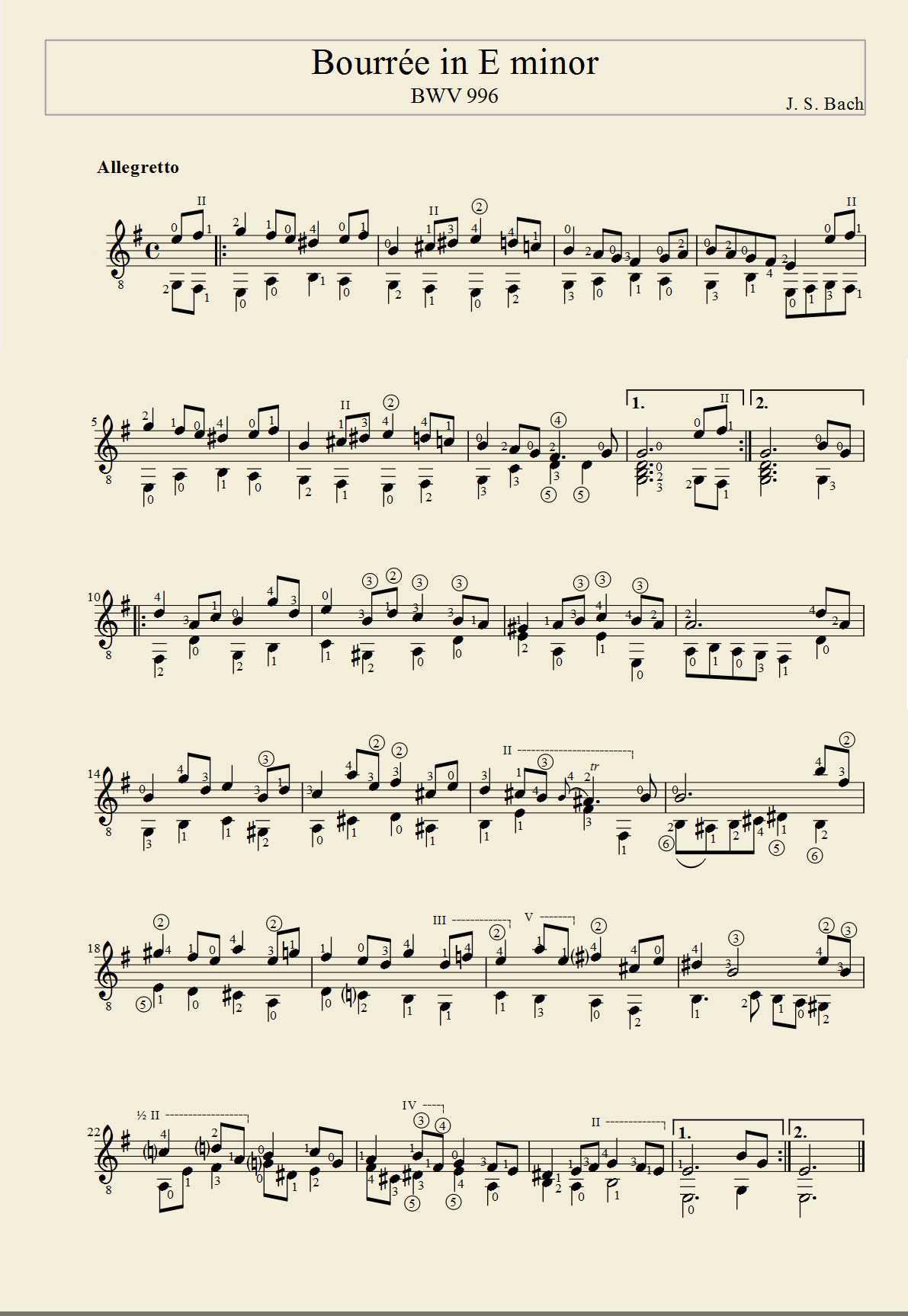
J.S. Bach 'Bourree in E minor' (BWV 996)

Bourrée in E minor is a popular lute piece, the fifth movement from Suite in E minor BWV 996 (BC L166) written by Johann Sebastian Bach between 1708 and 1717. The piece is arguably one of the most famous among guitarists.

A bourrée was a type of dance that originated in France with quick duple meter and an upbeat. Though the bourrée was popular as a social dance and shown in theatrical ballets during the reign of Louis XIV of France, the Bourrée in E minor was not intended for dancing. Nonetheless, some of the elements of the dance are incorporated in the piece.

Bach wrote his "lute" pieces in a traditional score rather than in lute tablature, and it is believed that Bach played these pieces on the Lautenwerk, a keyboard instrument acoustically imitating the lute. No original script of the Suite in E minor for Lute by Bach is known to exist. However, in the collection of one of Bach's pupils, Johann Ludwig Krebs, there is one piece ("Praeludio – con la Suite da Gio: Bast. Bach") that has written "aufs Lauten Werck" ("for the lute-harpsichord") in unidentified handwriting. Some argue that despite this reference, the piece was meant to be played on the lute as demonstrated by the texture. Others argue that since the piece was written in E minor, it would be incompatible with the baroque lute which was tuned to D minor. Nevertheless, it may be played with other string instruments, such as the guitar, mandola or mandocello, and keyboard instruments, and it is especially well known among guitarists. The tempo of the piece is fairly quick and smooth. It also demonstrates counterpoint, as the two voices move independently of one another. Furthermore, the Bourrée in E minor demonstrates binary form.

Lute Suite No,. 1 - BWV 996, E Minor - V Bourrée
Performed on a lautenwerck by Martha Goldstein

J.S. Bach "Bourrée in E minor" (BWV 996)
Performed on an organ

== In classical music ==
Robert Schumann quotes the first 14 notes of this memorable theme (transposed to G minor) in #3 of the Op. 60, 6 Fugues on B–A–C–H, where he neatly combines it with the B♭ A C B motif. There also appears to be an echo of this reference in the next fugue, #4.

== Jethro Tull version ==
"Bourrée"

Single by Jethro Tull

from the album Stand Up
- B-side: "Fat Man"
- Released: 13 October 1969
- Recorded: April 24, 1969
- Studio: Olympic Studios, London, UK
- Genre: Jazz fusion, instrumental rock
- Length: 3:46
- Label: Chrysalis, Island, Reprise, Fontana
- Songwriters: J.S. Bach, arr. Ian Anderson
- Producers: Ian Anderson, Terry Ellis

Jethro Tull singles chronology
"Living in the Past" (1969)	"Bourrée" (1969)	"Sweet Dream" (1969)

Jethro Tull used the first eight bars of the piece as the basis for the song "Bourée", from their 1969 album Stand Up. Like many Jethro Tull songs, it prominently features Ian Anderson's flute playing. The song also includes a bass guitar solo, played by Glenn Cornick on the original recording. Alternate studio recordings appear on The Jethro Tull Christmas Album and the 25th Anniversary Box Set. It is a staple of the band's concerts, and appears on the live albums Bursting Out, A Little Light Music, Nothing Is Easy: Live at the Isle of Wight 1970, and Live at Montreux 2003, as well as the concert DVD Living with the Past.

In April 2011, Anderson played a duet version of the song with NASA astronaut Cady Coleman, who was on board the International Space Station at the time, as a celebration of 50 years of human spaceflight.

== In popular culture ==
The piece has been used by a number of musicians:

- Bola Sete covered the composition on his album Tour de Force from 1964.
- Paul McCartney has said in interviews and on tours that the songs "Blackbird" and "Jenny Wren" were both inspired by variations and alterations to the bourrée.
- The London Blues-rock group Bakerloo released their arrangement of the tune, titled "Drivin' Bachwards", as a single on Harvest Records (HAR 5004) in July 1969. The same recording appeared on their self-titled debut album (Harvest SHVL 762) the following December.
- Jimmy Page of Led Zeppelin occasionally incorporated the opening melody of the piece into live performances of the song "Heartbreaker", during the song's guitar solo. Page also mentioned bourrée as an inspiration for the acoustic intro of the song "Stairway to Heaven"
- Tenacious D used the piece for their songs "Rock Your Socks", from their self-titled album, and "Classico", from the soundtrack of the film Tenacious D in The Pick of Destiny.
- Yngwie Malmsteen has also been known to integrate this, among other works by Bach, into his live sets.
- Leo Kottke performs "Bourrée" on the album Mudlark.
- The piece appears in "First Impressions" from Harumi's self-titled album.
- Lenny Breau re-harmonized this piece and recorded it on the album Minors Aloud under the title "On a Bach Bouree".
- Alter Bridge used this riff as the chorus to "Wayward One", the closing track of their 2007 album Blackbird.
- Jam-80, a short-lived Icelandic band featuring Björk, recorded it on a demo cassette.
- It has been adapted for the Commodore 64 version of Black Lamp.
- Blizzard composer Glenn Stafford used it in the soundtrack for Warcraft II: Tides of Darkness in the second half of the song titled "Human 2".
- Blues Saraceno covered the bourrée on his 1994 album Hairpick. This version used Jethro Tull's arrangement.
- In 2014, German band Son of a Bach released a heavy metal cover of the bourrée on YouTube, which was viewed almost 2 million times.
- Gabrielle McCarthy led the Flying Luttenbachers in a secret exhibition performance of a modern variant at Constellation Jazz Club in 2019.

== See also ==
- List of compositions by Johann Sebastian Bach
