= Benefit (album) =

Studio album by Jethro Tull
- Released: 24 April 1970
- Recorded: 3 September 1969 – 25 February 1970
- Studios: Morgan Studios, London
- Genres: Hard rock; folk rock
- Length: 42:00
- Labels: Chrysalis/Island (Europe); Reprise (America, Japan and Oceania)
- Producers: Ian Anderson, Terry Ellis (exec.)

Jethro Tull chronology
Stand Up (1969)	Benefit (1970)	Aqualung (1971)

Singles from Benefit
- 1. "Inside" Released: 24 April 1970

Benefit is the third studio album by the British rock band Jethro Tull, released in April 1970. It was the first Tull album to include pianist and organist John Evan and the last to include bass guitarist Glenn Cornick, who was fired from the band upon completion of touring for the album. It was recorded at Morgan Studios, the same studio where the band recorded its previous album Stand Up; however, they experimented with more advanced recording techniques.

Frontman Ian Anderson said that he considers Benefit to be a much darker album than Stand Up, owing to the pressures of an extensive U.S. tour and frustration with the music business.

== Production ==
Guitarist Martin Barre noted that Benefit was much easier to create than the band's earlier albums, as the success of Stand Up gave the musicians greater artistic freedom.

Bassist Glenn Cornick explained that the band aimed to capture a more "live" feel with the album, remarking, "I felt the last one sounded like a group of session musicians performing various songs. It was pretty cold."

Benefit incorporated studio techniques such as reverse recording (flute and piano tracks on "With You There to Help Me"), and manipulating the tape speed (guitar on "Play in Time"). In a 1970 interview Anderson noted that the addition of keyboardist John Evan had changed the band's style: "John has added a new dimension musically and I can write more freely now. In fact anything is possible with him at the keyboard".

== Musical style ==
Ian Anderson said that Benefit was a "guitar riff" album, recorded at a time when the riff-oriented music of artists like Cream, Jimi Hendrix and Led Zeppelin was much in evidence. Anderson also noted that Benefit is "a rather dark and stark album and, although it has a few songs on it that are rather okay, I don't think it has the breadth, variety or detail that Stand Up has. But it was an evolution in terms of the band playing as 'a band.'" Overall, Anderson considered the album "a natural part of the group's evolution".

According to Martin Barre "To Cry You a Song" was a response to Blind Faith's "Had to Cry Today", "although you couldn't compare the two; nothing was stolen ... The riff crossed over the bar in a couple of places and Ian and I each played guitars on the backing tracks. It was more or less live in the studio with a couple of overdubs and a solo. Ian played my Gibson SG and I played a Les Paul on it."

== Releases ==
The UK and the US release are different. The US version (with flute) of "Teacher" was placed on side two of the album, and the track "Alive and Well and Living In" was excluded. In the UK, "Teacher" was the B-side of the non-album single "The Witch's Promise", and was without a flute.

In 2013, the Collector's Edition of Benefit was released. It contains bonus tracks mixed by Steven Wilson, a disc with mono and stereo mixes of rare and previously unreleased versions of tracks and singles and an audio-only DVD that includes a surround sound mix of the original album. The Collector's Edition also includes a booklet featuring an 8,000-word essay written by Martin Webb, as well as interviews with band members and a selection of photos, some previously unseen.

For the 50th anniversary of the album, an enhanced edition was released in 2021, consisting of four CDs and two DVDs.

== Critical reception ==
Professional ratings
Review scores
Source	Rating
AllMusic	4/5 stars
Christgau's Record Guide	B−
The Daily Vault	B+
The Encyclopedia of Popular Music	3/5 stars
Record Collector	4/5 stars

Critics were generally unimpressed with Benefit upon its release. Rolling Stone called the album "lame and dumb". Disc and Music Echo was also unimpressed but recognized the band's quality: "This album doesn't advance by such a drastic leap as Stand Up did from This Was. It's more like the Jethro Tull we've seen and heard for the past year. It seems to be a remarkably long album, and shows what an exciting group this is. Exciting because they can have quite long guitar breaks and still retain a very tight and together sound". The Village Voice critic Robert Christgau appreciated the riffs around which all the songs were constructed, but wasn't impressed by the lyrics that he judged hard to recall.

=== Legacy ===
AllMusic and Record Collector's much-later reviews were more positive in accepting the album's style. Bruce Eder stated that: "Most of the songs on Benefit display pleasant, delectably folk-like melodies attached to downbeat, slightly gloomy, but dazzlingly complex lyrics, with Barre's guitar adding enough wattage to keep the hard rock listeners very interested. 'To Cry You a Song', 'Son', and 'For Michael Collins, Jeffrey and Me' all defined Tull's future sound: Barre's amp cranked up to ten (especially on 'Son'), coming in above Anderson's acoustic strumming, a few unexpected changes in tempo, and Anderson spouting lyrics filled with dense, seemingly profound imagery and statements." Record Collector reviewer, analysing the Collector's Edition of 2013, praised the Steven Wilson remix and wrote: "Benefit forms the perfect bridge between the rolling, tumbling Tull of old and the tightly braided riffs and prickly lyrics presented by Aqualung." Paul Stump, in his History of Progressive Rock, said that Benefit "maintained the invention (and sales) of its predecessor, once again teasing unexpected emotional reflexes from time-honoured voicings and rhythms to signpost something that, if not a wholly new kind of pop song, at least offered the listener new bearings in his or her search."

== Track listing ==
=== 1970 UK release ===
All music is composed by Ian Anderson.

Side one
No.	Title	Length
1.	"With You There to Help Me"	6:20
2.	"Nothing to Say"	5:10
3.	"Alive and Well and Living In"	2:47
4.	"Son"	2:52
5.	"For Michael Collins, Jeffrey and Me"	3:59

Side two
No.	Title	Length
6.	"To Cry You a Song"	6:09
7.	"A Time for Everything?"	2:43
8.	"Inside"	3:40
9.	"Play in Time"	3:45
10.	"Sossity; You're a Woman"	4:35

2001 CD bonus tracks
No.	Title	Length
11.	"Singing All Day"	3:07
12.	"Witch's Promise"	3:52
13.	"Just Trying to Be"	1:37
14.	"Teacher" (Labelled Original UK Mix, but actually US version)	3:49

=== 1970 US release ===
Side one
No.	Title	Length
1.	"With You There to Help Me"	6:15
2.	"Nothing to Say"	5:10
3.	"Inside"	3:46
4.	"Son"	2:48
5.	"For Michael Collins, Jeffrey and Me"	3:47

Side two
No.	Title	Length
6.	"To Cry You a Song"	6:09
7.	"A Time for Everything?"	2:42
8.	"Teacher"	3:57
9.	"Play in Time"	3:44
10.	"Sossity; You're a Woman"	4:31

=== 2013 A Collector's Edition (3 Discs) ===
CD 1: Steven Wilson stereo remix of the album and associated recordings
No.	Title	Length
1.	"With You There to Help Me"	6:20
2.	"Nothing to Say"	5:13
3.	"Alive and Well and Living In"	2:48
4.	"Son"	2:53
5.	"For Michael Collins, Jeffrey and Me"	3:49
6.	"To Cry You a Song"	6:16
7.	"A Time for Everything?"	2:45
8.	"Inside"	3:38
9.	"Play in Time"	3:49
10.	"Sossity; You're a Woman"	4:37
11.	"Singing All Day"	3:07
12.	"Sweet Dream"	4:03
13.	"17"	6:20
14.	"Teacher (UK Single Version)"	4:58
15.	"Teacher (US Album Version)"	4:03

CD 2: Associated Recordings 1969-1970
No.	Title	Length
1.	"Singing All Day" (mono)	3:08
2.	"Sweet Dream" (mono)	4:04
3.	"17" (mono)	6:11
4.	"Sweet Dream" (stereo)	4:04
5.	"17" (stereo)	5:32
6.	"Witch's Promise" (mono)	4:01
7.	"Teacher" (U.K single version - mono)	4:51
8.	"Teacher" (U.S album version - mono)	4:00
9.	"Witch's Promise" (stereo)	3:51
10.	"Teacher" (U.K single version - stereo)	4:51
11.	"Teacher" (U.S album version - stereo)	4:00
12.	"Inside" (single edit - mono)	2:43
13.	"Alive and Well and Living In" (mono)	2:48
14.	"A Time for Everything" (mono)	2:46
15.	"Reprise AM Radio Spot 1" (mono)	1:05
16.	"Reprise FM Radio Spot 2" (stereo)	1:05

DVD: Steven Wilson 5.1 surround remix of the album and associated recordings
No.	Title	Length
1.	"With You There to Help Me"	6:20
2.	"Nothing to Say"	5:13
3.	"Alive and Well and Living In"	2:48
4.	"Son"	2:53
5.	"For Michael Collins, Jeffrey and Me"	3:49
6.	"To Cry You a Song"	6:16
7.	"A Time for Everything?"	2:45
8.	"Inside"	3:38
9.	"Play in Time"	3:49
10.	"Sossity; You're a Woman"	4:37
11.	"Singing All Day"	3:07
12.	"Sweet Dream"	4:03
13.	"17"	6:20
14.	"Teacher (UK Single Version)"	4:58
15.	"Teacher (US Album Version)"	4:03

== Personnel ==
Jethro Tull

- Ian Anderson – vocals, acoustic guitar, electric guitar (uncredited), flute, balalaika, keyboards, production
- Martin Barre – electric guitar
- Glenn Cornick – bass guitar, Hammond organ (uncredited)
- Clive Bunker – drums, percussion

Additional musicians

- Dee Palmer – orchestral arrangements
- John Evan – piano, organ

Production

- Robin Black – engineer
- Terry Ellis – cover design, executive producer
- Ruan O'Lochlainn – cover design, photography

== Charts ==
Chart (1970–1971)	Peak position
Australian Albums (Kent Music Report)	12
Canada Top Albums/CDs (RPM)	22
Danish Albums (Hitlisten)	6
Dutch Albums (Album Top 100)	6
Finnish Albums (The Official Finnish Charts)	7
German Albums (Offizielle Top 100)	5
Italian Albums (Musica e Dischi)	18
Norwegian Albums (VG-lista)	2
UK Albums (Official Charts)	3
US Billboard 200	11

Chart (2013)	Peak position
Italian Albums (FIMI)	97

Chart (2021)	Peak position
Hungarian Albums (MAHASZ)	32
Scottish Albums (Official Charts)	14
UK Albums (Official Charts)	44
UK Progressive Albums (Official Charts)	2
UK Rock & Metal Albums (Official Charts)	2

== Certifications ==
Region	Certification	Certified units/sales
United States (RIAA)	Gold	500,000^{^}
^{^} Shipments figures based on certification alone.
