= Phoenix House =

American nonprofit organization

Phoenix House Foundation
- Formation: 1967
- Type: Not-for-profit organization
- Headquarters: New York, N.Y., U.S.
- Regions Served: New York, California, Florida, Texas, New England
- Founder: Mitchell Rosenthal
- Website: phoenixhouse.org

Phoenix House Foundation was a not-for-profit drug and alcohol rehabilitation organization in the United States, operating 150 programs in ten states. Programs served individuals, families, and communities affected by substance abuse and dependency.

In March 2019, the national Phoenix House Foundation dissolved into various regional organizations, including: Phoenix House California, Phoenix House Florida, Phoenix House New England, Phoenix House New York, Phoenix House Texas, and Phoenix House Mid-Atlantic, which later changed its name to National Capital Treatment & Recovery.

== History ==
Phoenix House was founded in 1967 by six heroin addicts who met at a detoxification program in a New York hospital. They were concerned about staying clean after detoxification, so they moved from New York City's Addiction Services Agency (ASA) soon incorporated structure and treatment programming into the community. As Commissioner of ASA for rehabilitation, Dr. Mitchell Rosenthal, who had spent time observing Synanon used their methods and model of treatment to start Phoenix House the model for a citywide treatment network. The most obvious Synanon methods used within the Phoenix House program are the stripping of your identity on admission, encounter groups (called The Game by Synanon and Phoenix House), work-based treatment. Phoenix House played a role in creating the country's first correctional treatment unit, a model now widely replicated in prisons throughout the country and abroad. Phoenix House was also an early provider of treatment as an alternative to prison. In 1983, Phoenix House opened its first Phoenix House Academy, a residential high school where teens receive substance abuse treatment as well as daily on-site academic education. Eleven Phoenix House Academies now operate in seven states and have been designated a “model program” by the U.S. Department of Justice in 2005. The organization is funded mostly by government contracts, but also receives philanthropic support for a portion of its $100 million annual budget. In addition to residential treatment, Phoenix House's continuum of care includes prevention and education, outpatient services, sober living and recovery support, as well as specialty programs for mothers with young children, criminal justice clients, and the military community.

== Regional organizations ==
=== Phoenix House California ===
Since 1979, Phoenix House has offered services in California. Currently, the agency serves more than 18,000 adults and children each day. The comprehensive continuum of care includes prevention; intervention; residential and outpatient treatment for adults and teens; as well as services for veterans, transitional age youth, and clients with co-occurring mental disorders. Phoenix House also offers wraparound services, home-based case management, and recovery support.

Phoenix House treated adolescents in various facilities until 2015, when their Descanso, CA location, which opened in 1986, closed after numerous reports were investigated by San Diego County Department of Social Services, with whom Phoenix House had contracts for nearly twenty years. It was found that a female counselor on staff had sex with a male resident on more than one occasion and had provided him with methamphetamines. Another incident that was investigated and validated was that a male staff member was providing residents with pornography. Around that same time, five residents of the Phoenix House facility in Descanso, CA were involved in a violent brawl involving 15 - 20 male adolescent residents, which resulted in one adolescent being severely beaten and suffering extensive injuries. During the fight, Phoenix House staff did not intervene, waiting for law enforcement to arrive. State investigators found that the facility was understaffed to begin with. Another incident found by California State Investigators involved two Phoenix House adolescent residents who walked away from an off-campus outing to a Mission Valley mall in San Diego and were later found in Poway, CA, testing positive for drugs. Phoenix House Descanso announced a week after that incident that they were closing the facility for financial reasons.

=== Phoenix House Florida ===
Phoenix House has served Florida since the early 1990s, treating Tampa adolescents and adults at their Derek Jeter Center and Adult Outpatient Counseling Center, respectively. Adults with advanced substance abuse or substance abuse complicated by mental health conditions are treated at Phoenix House's Citra residential facility in Marion County. It is one of several programs that receive funding from the Florida Department of Corrections. Phoenix House Florida has expanded in February 2026 with the opening of a new residential facility focused on serving those in Hillsborough County seeking residential substance use treatment. It is located across from the Orient Road jail and tailors treatment to each client.

=== Phoenix House New England ===
Phoenix Houses of New England – originally called Marathon House – was founded in 1967 by a coalition of social service professionals, clergy, business, and political leaders in Providence, Rhode Island. Today, they operate 45 programs in Connecticut, Maine, Massachusetts, New Hampshire, Rhode Island, and Vermont. In addition to residential and outpatient programs, Phoenix Houses of New England provides services for specific populations, including the homeless, persons involved with the criminal justice system and those charged with driving under the influence. Most recently, in a partnership with the Gavin Foundation, Phoenix House opened a new detox and transitional unit in Quincy, MA to help address the growing problem with addiction and particularly opioid addiction.

=== Phoenix House New York ===
In New York, where the first Phoenix House program opened in 1967 and the Phoenix House Academy model was introduced in 1983, Phoenix House now provides a range of programs that includes afterschool outpatient treatment for adolescents and their families, residential and outpatient options for adults and adolescents, programs for mothers with small children, programs that serve clients with co-occurring mental illness, and support services for substance abusers in recovery.

=== Phoenix House Texas ===
Phoenix House Texas (PHT) was founded in 1995 and currently operates substance use prevention and mental health education services in schools and communities in Houston, Dallas, and Austin. Phoenix House Texas reaches over 51,000 underserved youth and adults through its prevention services annually.

Phoenix House Texas had provided substance use primary residential and outpatient treatment to adolescents regardless of ability to pay from its inception in 1995 until September 29, 2023, when the organization closed all treatment programs due to lack of sufficient, sustainable funding.

=== National Capital Treatment & Recovery ===
National Capital Treatment & Recovery (formerly known as Phoenix Houses of the Mid-Atlantic and before that as Vanguard Services Unlimited) serves individuals struggling with substance abuse in Maryland, Virginia, Washington, D.C., Delaware, Pennsylvania, and New Jersey. Programs provide residential, transitional, and outpatient treatment with gender-specific programs to adults and adolescents. A Spanish-language men's residential program is also offered.

== Celebrity involvement ==
Completing work on Cadillac Records, Beyoncé Knowles donated her entire salary to Phoenix House. Beyoncé also visited the Phoenix House Career Academy at Jay Street in Brooklyn, New York, while preparing to portray singer Etta James, who was once addicted to heroin. Beyoncé and her mother and business partner Tina Knowles later founded the Career Academy's Beyoncé Cosmetology Center, which offers a seven-month cosmetology training program for adults.

Grammy-nominated singer/songwriter Kara DioGuardi created and contributes to the Phoenix Rising Music Program, which includes recording studios in three Phoenix House Academy facilities. The program teaches teens how to operate music recording equipment and how to record their own music as part of their music therapy programs.

Phoenix House is thanked in the liner notes of Velvet Gloves and Spit.

== Affiliates ==
Phoenix House is affiliated with COAF (Center on Addiction and the Family). COAF helps families affected by alcohol and other drug abuse and also runs the Facts on Tap education campaign for college students.

Phoenix House was also established in the UK as an entirely separate organisation, though has its origins in the USA-based Phoenix House described above. Phoenix House (UK) runs a number of residential rehabilitation units, structured day programs and is the largest not for profit provider of prison based substance misuse programmes in the UK. In November 2006, Phoenix House (UK) rebranded to trade under the name 'Phoenix Futures.

== Drug policy ==
The organization's past president opposed the legalization of marijuana, and has opposed needle exchanges to provide clean needles to addicts.

== See also ==
- Drug rehabilitation
