= A Song for Jeffrey =

Single by Jethro Tull

from the album This Was
- B-side: "One for John Gee"
- Released: 13 September 1968 UK
- Recorded: 27 July 1968
- Studio: Sound Techniques Studio, London, UK
- Genre: Blues; psychedelic blues
- Length: 3:22
- Label: Island 6043
- Songwriter: Ian Anderson
- Producers: Jethro Tull, Terry Ellis

Jethro Tull singles chronology
"Sunshine Day" (1968)	"A Song for Jeffrey" (1968)	"Love Story" (1968)

"A Song for Jeffrey" is a song recorded by the English rock band Jethro Tull, released as their second single in the UK, and as the B-side to "Love Story" in the US. The "Jeffrey" of the title is Ian Anderson's friend and future Jethro Tull bassist Jeffrey Hammond, who was "a slightly wayward lad who wasn’t quite sure where he was headed in life".

The song starts off with a bass riff by Glenn Cornick before Ian Anderson's flute comes in. It then becomes a psychedelic blues tune, with guitarist Mick Abrahams playing slide guitar. Despite being similar in style to "My Sunday Feeling" and "Beggar's Farm", the instrumental section shows a greater influence of jazz rather than blues.

The song was largely praised by music critics. AllMusic's Bruce Eder called it "a superb example of commercial psychedelic blues" but did not consider it one of the album highlights. George Starostin called it one of the "catchiest ditties the band ever did: the interplay between the bloozy guitar and the poppy harmonica is amazing and promptly digs itself into your memory". Despite the single not reaching the charts, New Musical Express wrote that it was "good enough to have made the Chart".

The song was performed on the Rolling Stones Rock 'n' Roll Circus in December 1968, although only Ian Anderson's vocals and flute were amplified for the live performance; the rest of the band mimed their parts, but the sound was pre-recorded. This was the only Tull performance with guitarist Tony Iommi during his two-week tenure with the band, and it has been suggested that he had not had time to learn his part and thus relied on Abrahams' recording. This version was officially released on the companion album to the film in 1996. A version of the song was recorded for play on BBC radio.

"A Song for Jeffrey" was ranked the 25th best Jethro Tull song by Rock – Das Gesamtwerk der größten Rock-Acts im Check.
