= Life Is a Long Song =

1971 Jethro Tull song

Song by Jethro Tull

from the EP Life Is a Long Song / Up the Pool
- Released: 3 September 1971
- Recorded: 17 May 1971
- Studio: Sound Techniques, London
- Genre: Folk rock
- Label: Chrysalis
- Songwriter: Ian Anderson
- Producer: Ian Anderson

"Life Is a Long Song" is a song composed by Ian Anderson and first recorded by Jethro Tull. It was released as a single on 3 September 1971, and reached No. 11 on the UK charts. The song later appeared on the 1972 compilation album Living in the Past.

The song is centred around Anderson's acoustic guitar playing, and the lyrics talking about everyday life, concluding that "the tune ends too soon for us all". It is the first Jethro Tull recording to feature drummer Barriemore Barlow, who had joined the group shortly before.

Fairport Convention covered the song on their 1997 album Who Knows Where the Time Goes.
