= This Was =

1968 studio album by Jethro Tull

Studio album by Jethro Tull
- Released: 25 October 1968
- Recorded: 13 June – 27 July 1968
- Studios: Sound Techniques, Chelsea, London
- Genres: Blues rock; jazz fusion; folk rock
- Length: 38:22
- Labels: Island (UK); Reprise (US)
- Producers: Terry Ellis, Jethro Tull

Jethro Tull chronology
This Was (1968)	Stand Up (1969)

Singles from This Was
- 1. "A Song for Jeffrey" Released: September 1968

This Was is the debut studio album by the British rock band Jethro Tull, released in October 1968. Recorded at a cost of £1200, it is the only Jethro Tull album with guitarist Mick Abrahams, who was a major influence for the sound and music style of the band's first songs. When the album was released, the band were performing regularly at the Marquee Club in London, where other successful British groups, such as the Rolling Stones and the Who, had started their careers.

The album was released in the United States in February 1969, peaking at No. 62 in April.

Compared to the band's later discography, This Was contains significant blues rock and jazz fusion influences, owing to Abrahams' songwriting and playing style. The band abandoned much of these influences upon Abrahams' departure after the release of the album, starting with follow up album Stand Up (1969).

== Background and recording ==
While vocalist Ian Anderson's creative vision largely shaped Jethro Tull's later albums, on This Was Anderson shared songwriting duties with Tull's guitarist Mick Abrahams, who Anderson said was "another, equal driving force in the band during the period that he was there". In part due to Abrahams' influence, the album incorporates more rhythm and blues and jazz influences than the progressive rock the band later became known for. This Was also contains the only Jethro Tull lead vocal not performed by Ian Anderson on a studio album, in "Move on Alone". Mick Abrahams, the song's author, provided vocals; Dee Palmer provided the horn arrangement. Abrahams left Jethro Tull following the album's completion, while Palmer joined Jethro Tull following the album's completion.

A friend showed Anderson the album I Talk with the Spirits, and after listening to it, Anderson found the tune "Serenade to a Cuckoo" was "stuck in my head". He convinced the rest of the band to cover it, and it became his flute showcase piece for concerts until it was supplanted in that role by "Bourée" (which appears on Stand Up).

The song "Dharma for One", a staple of Tull's early concerts (usually incorporating an extended drum solo by Clive Bunker), was later covered by Ekseption, Pesky Gee! and The Ides of March. This song featured use of the "claghorn", a hybrid instrument invented by Jeffrey Hammond which combined the body of a recorder, the bell of a toy trumpet and the mouthpiece of a saxophone. Anderson also claims to have invented the instrument.

In the documentary film Woodstock, the songs "Beggar's Farm" and "Serenade to a Cuckoo" can be heard playing over the festival's PA system.

== Reception ==
Professional ratings
Review scores
Source	Rating
AllMusic	3/5 stars
Record Collector	3/5 stars
The Village Voice	C−
The Daily Vault	A
Encyclopedia of Popular Music	5/5 stars

This Was received generally favourable reviews and sold well upon its release. Record Mirror thoroughly recommended the album in 1968 for being "full of excitement and emotion" and described the band as a blues ensemble "influenced by jazz music" capable of setting "the audience on fire". Allen Evans of New Musical Express wrote in his review that the album "sounds good and has a lot of humour about it" and that the band "play jazz really, in a soft, appealing way, and have a bit of fun on the side with tone patterns and singing". American critic Robert Christgau, on the contrary, was appalled by the success of a band that combined "the worst of Roland Kirk, Arthur Brown, and your nearest G.O. blues band."

Recent reviews of the remastered edition underline the duality of Anderson and Abrahams' songwriting and stage presence, as well as the strong ties of the band to blues in their early days. Sid Smith of BBC Music wrote that "what made Tull stand out from the great-coated crowd (of touring bands) was the high-visibility of frontman Ian Anderson's on-stage Tourette's-inspired hyper-gurning and Mick Abraham's ferocious fretwork." An AllMusic reviewer remarked how Jethro Tull on their vinyl debut appeared "vaguely reminiscent of the Graham Bond Organization only more cohesive, and with greater commercial sense". David Davies of Record Collector reminds how "This Was only hints at the depth and majesty of the ensuing seven albums", but also wrote that "the direct, unfussy and predominantly blues-based" tracks of the original recordings and the extra tracks of the collector's edition "could well come as something of a surprise" and "be of the greatest interest to Tull aficionados."

The album reached number 10 on the UK Albums Chart and number 62 on the US Billboard 200. It was voted number 574 in Colin Larkin's All Time Top 1000 Albums.

== Track listings ==
=== Standard edition ===
Side one
No.	Title	Writer(s)	Length
1.	"My Sunday Feeling"	Ian Anderson	3:43
2.	"Some Day the Sun Won't Shine for You"	Anderson	2:49
3.	"Beggar's Farm"	Mick Abrahams, Anderson	4:19
4.	"Move on Alone"	Abrahams	1:58
5.	"Serenade to a Cuckoo"	Roland Kirk	6:07

Side two
No.	Title	Writer(s)	Length
1.	"Dharma for One"	Anderson, Clive Bunker	4:15
2.	"It's Breaking Me Up"	Anderson	5:04
3.	"Cat's Squirrel"	Traditional, (Note: The album fails to credit the composer of this track, bluesman Isaiah Ross.) arranged by Abrahams	5:42
4.	"A Song for Jeffrey"	Anderson	3:22
5.	"Round"	Anderson, Abrahams, Bunker, Glenn Cornick, Terry Ellis	1:03
Total length:			38:22

- 1973 cassette reissue has same track order, but on opposite sides.
- Sides one and two were combined as tracks 1–10 on CD reissues.

2001 remaster bonus tracks
No.	Title	Writer(s)	Length
11.	"One for John Gee" (B-side of "A Song for Jeffrey" single, September 1968)	Abrahams	2:06
12.	"Love Story" (non-album single, October 1968)	Anderson	3:06
13.	"A Christmas Song" (B-side of "Love Story" single, October 1968)	Anderson	3:06
Total length:			46:40

- The 2001 remastered CD added three bonus tracks (which had been on the 20 Years of Jethro Tull box-set) and extensive liner notes.

2018 bonus tracks, Steven Wilson remix
No.	Title	Writer(s)	Length
11.	"Love Story"		3:03
12.	"A Christmas Song"		3:09
13.	"Serenade to a Cuckoo (take 1)" (previously unreleased)		5:46
14.	"Some Day the Sun Won't Shine for You (faster version)" (previously unreleased)		2:36
15.	"Move on Alone (flute version)" (previously unreleased)		2:01
16.	"Ultimate Confusion" (previously unreleased)	Anderson, Abrahams, Cornick and Bunker	2:56
Total length:			57:54

- The 2018 edition CD added six bonus tracks (including four previously unreleased tracks).

=== 40th anniversary collectors' edition (2008) ===
A deluxe, two-CD 40th anniversary edition was released in 2008. It contains the original mono version, a stereo version remixed from the original four-track session tapes, non-LP single tracks and the BBC sessions recorded by the band in 1968 for John Peel's "Top Gear".

Disc one: Original Mono LP (Remastered) & BBC Sessions
No.	Title	Writer(s)	Length
1.	"My Sunday Feeling"		3:43
2.	"Some Day the Sun Won't Shine for You"		2:49
3.	"Beggar's Farm"		4:23
4.	"Move on Alone"		2:00
5.	"Serenade to a Cuckoo" (instrumental)		6:07
6.	"Dharma for One" (instrumental)		4:13
7.	"It's Breaking Me Up"		5:01
8.	"Cat's Squirrel" (instrumental)		5:40
9.	"A Song for Jeffrey"		3:26
10.	"Round" (instrumental)		0:59
11.	"So Much Trouble" (John Peel Session: 23 July 1968)	Brownie McGhee	3:19
12.	"My Sunday Feeling" (John Peel Session: 23 July 1968)		3:49
13.	"Serenade to a Cuckoo" (John Peel Session: 23 July 1968 - instrumental)		3:37
14.	"Cat's Squirrel" (John Peel Session: 23 July 1968 - instrumental)		4:38
15.	"A Song for Jeffrey" (John Peel Session: 23 July 1968)		3:13
16.	"Love Story" (John Peel Session: 5 November 1968)		3:04
17.	"Stormy Monday" (John Peel Session: 5 November 1968)	T-Bone Walker	4:09
18.	"Beggar's Farm" (John Peel Session: 5 November 1968)		3:22
19.	"Dharma for One" (John Peel Session: 5 November 1968 - instrumental)		3:46

Disc two: New Stereo Album Mix + Additional New Stereo Mixes & Original Mono Recordings (Remastered)
No.	Title	Length
1.	"My Sunday Feeling"	3:42
2.	"Some Day the Sun Won't Shine for You"	2:47
3.	"Beggar's Farm"	4:21
4.	"Move on Alone"	1:57
5.	"Serenade to a Cuckoo" (instrumental)	6:05
6.	"Dharma for One" (instrumental)	4:13
7.	"It's Breaking Me Up"	5:03
8.	"Cat's Squirrel" (instrumental)	5:39
9.	"A Song for Jeffrey"	3:23
10.	"Round" (instrumental)	1:00
11.	"Love Story" (New Stereo Mix)	3:05
12.	"Christmas Song" (New Stereo Mix)	3:13
13.	"Sunshine Day" (A-side of single MGM 1384 released in February 1968, original mono recording)	2:26
14.	"One for John Gee" (B-side of "Song for Jeffrey" single, original mono recording, instrumental)	2:05
15.	"Love Story" (A-side of single WIP 6048 released in November 1968 on Island, original mono recording)	3:05
16.	"Christmas Song" (B-side of "Love Story" single, original mono recording)	3:05
Total length:		126:30

=== 50th anniversary collectors' edition (2018) ===
CD1: A Steven Wilson Stereo Mix and Associated Recordings
No.	Title	Writer(s)	Length
1.	"My Sunday Feeling" (New Stereo Mix)	Anderson	3:43
2.	"Some Day the Sun Won't Shine for You" (New Stereo Mix)	Anderson	2:49
3.	"Beggar's Farm" (New Stereo Mix)	Abrahams, Anderson	4:23
4.	"Move on Alone" (New Stereo Mix)	Abrahams	2:00
5.	"Serenade to a Cuckoo" (Instrumental - New Stereo Mix)	Kirk	6:07
6.	"Dharma for One" (Instrumental - New Stereo Mix)	Anderson, Bunker	4:13
7.	"It's Breaking Me Up" (New Stereo Mix)	Anderson	5:01
8.	"Cat's Squirrel" (Instrumental - New Stereo Mix)	Traditional, arranged by Abrahams	5:40
9.	"A Song for Jeffrey" (New Stereo Mix)	Anderson	3:26
10.	"Round" (Instrumental - New Stereo Mix)	Abrahams, Anderson, Bunker, Cornick	0:59
11.	"Love Story" (New Stereo Mix)	Anderson	3:03
12.	"A Christmas Song" (New Stereo Mix)	Anderson	3:50
13.	"Serenade to a Cuckoo" (Instrumental - Take 1 - New Stereo Mix)	Kirk	5:46
14.	"Some Day the Sun Won't Shine for You" (Faster Version - New Stereo Mix)	Anderson	2:36
15.	"Move on Alone" (Flute Version - New Stereo Mix)	Abrahams	2:01
16.	"Ultimate Confusion" (John Peel Session: 5 November 1968 - New Stereo Mix)	Abrahams, Anderson, Bunker, Cornick	2:56

CD2: Further Associated Recordings, Original Mixes and Radio Adverts
No.	Title	Writer(s)	Length
1.	"So Much Trouble" (BBC Top Gear Session, 23 July 1968)	McGhee	3:19
2.	"My Sunday Feeling" (BBC Top Gear Session, 23 July 1968)	Anderson	3:50
3.	"Serenade to a Cuckoo" (BBC Top Gear Session, 23 July 1968)	Kirk	3:37
4.	"Cat's Squirrel" (BBC Top Gear Session, 23 July 1968)	Traditional, arranged by Abrahams	4:39
5.	"A Song for Jeffrey" (BBC Top Gear Session, 23 July 1968)	Anderson	3:13
6.	"Love Story" (BBC Top Gear Session, 5 November 1968)	Anderson	3:05
7.	"Stormy Monday" (BBC Top Gear Session, 5 November 1968)	Walker	4:09
8.	"Beggar's Farm" (BBC Top Gear Session, 5 November 1968)	Abrahams, Anderson	3:22
9.	"Dharma for One" (BBC Top Gear Session, 5 November 1968)	Anderson, Bunker	3:47
10.	"A Song for Jeffrey" (Mono Single A-Side)	Anderson	3:23
11.	"One for John Gee" (Mono Single B-Side)	Abrahams	2:07
12.	"Some Day the Sun Won't Shine for You" (Faster Version)	Anderson	2:37
13.	"Love Story" (Mono Single A-Side)	Anderson	3:06
14.	"A Christmas Song" (Mono Single B-Side)	Anderson	3:07
15.	"Sunshine Day" (Mono MGM Single A-Side - credited to "Jethro Toe")	Abrahams	2:23
16.	"Aeroplane" (Mono MGM Single B-Side - credited to "John Evan Smash")	Anderson, "Les Barnard" (Cornick)	2:26
17.	"Blues for the 18th" (Studio Outtake - credited to "John Evan Smash")	Anderson, "Les Barnard" (Cornick)	2:53
18.	"Love Story" (1969 US Promo Stereo Mix for FM Radio Airplay)	Anderson	3:03
19.	"US FM Radio Spot #1"		0:52
20.	"US FM Radio Spot #2"		0:56

CD3: Original 1968 UK Stereo Mix (Disc Transfer), Original 1968 UK Mono Mix (2008 Remaster)
No.	Title	Writer(s)	Length
1.	"My Sunday Feeling" (Original 1968 UK Stereo Mix)	Anderson	3:42
2.	"Some Day the Sun Won't Shine for You" (Original 1968 UK Stereo Mix)	Anderson	2:48
3.	"Beggar's Farm" (Original 1968 UK Stereo Mix)	Abrahams, Anderson	4:22
4.	"Move on Alone" (Original 1968 UK Stereo Mix)	Abrahams	1:59
5.	"Serenade to a Cuckoo" (Instrumental - Original 1968 UK Stereo Mix)	Kirk	6:08
6.	"Dharma for One" (Instrumental - Original 1968 UK Stereo Mix)	Anderson, Bunker	4:13
7.	"It's Breaking Me Up" (Original 1968 UK Stereo Mix)	Anderson	5:01
8.	"Cat's Squirrel" (Instrumental - Original 1968 UK Stereo Mix)	Traditional, arranged by Abrahams	5:40
9.	"A Song for Jeffrey" (Original 1968 UK Stereo Mix)	Anderson	3:23
10.	"Round" (Instrumental - Original 1968 UK Stereo Mix)	Abrahams, Anderson, Bunker, Cornick	0:52
11.	"My Sunday Feeling" (Original 1968 UK Mono Mix)	Anderson	3:44
12.	"Some Day the Sun Won't Shine for You" (Original 1968 UK Mono Mix)	Anderson	2:49
13.	"Beggar's Farm" (Original 1968 UK Mono Mix)	Abrahams, Anderson	4:24
14.	"Move on Alone" (Original 1968 UK Mono Mix)	Abrahams	2:00
15.	"Serenade to a Cuckoo" (Instrumental - Original 1968 UK Mono Mix)	Kirk	6:07
16.	"Dharma for One" (Instrumental - Original 1968 UK Mono Mix)	Anderson, Bunker	4:14
17.	"It's Breaking Me Up" (Original 1968 UK Mono Mix)	Anderson	5:02
18.	"Cat's Squirrel" (Instrumental - Original 1968 UK Mono Mix)	Traditional, arranged by Abrahams	5:40
19.	"A Song for Jeffrey" (Original 1968 UK Mono Mix)	Anderson	3:26
20.	"Round" (Instrumental - Original 1968 UK Mono Mix)	Abrahams, Anderson, Bunker, Cornick	0:52

== Personnel ==
Jethro Tull

- Ian Anderson – lead vocals (all except track 4), flute, harmonica, claghorn (track 6), piano (track 10)
- Mick Abrahams – electric guitar, nine-string acoustic guitar, lead vocals (track 4), co-lead vocals (track 2), backing vocals
- Glenn Cornick – bass guitar
- Clive Bunker – drums, percussion hooter, charm bracelet

Additional musicians

- Dee Palmer – French horn and orchestral arrangements

Production

- Terry Ellis – producer
- Victor Gamm – engineer

== Charts ==
Chart (1968–1969)	Peak position
Finnish Albums (The Official Finnish Charts)	13
UK Albums (Official Charts)	10
US Billboard 200	62

Chart (2018)	Peak position
Belgian Albums (Ultratop Flanders)	181
German Albums (Offizielle Top 100)	28
Scottish Albums (Official Charts)	41
Spanish Albums (Promusicae)	78
UK Rock & Metal Albums (Official Charts)	2
