= Sweet Dream (Jethro Tull song) =

- Jethro Tull Sweet Dream German 7" Single

Single by Jethro Tull
- B-side: "17"
- Released: 3 October 1969
- Recorded: 31 August / 11 September 1969
- Studio: Morgan Studios, London, England
- Genre: Hard rock
- Length: 4:05
- Label: Chrysalis, Island, Reprise, Fontana
- Songwriter: Ian Anderson
- Producer: Ian Anderson

Jethro Tull singles chronology
"Bourée" (1969)	"Sweet Dream" (1969)	"The Witch's Promise" (1970)

"Sweet Dream" is a song recorded by English rock band Jethro Tull on 31 August 1969, at Morgan Studios, London. It was their second consecutive UK top ten single, reaching number 7 on the UK singles chart. The B-side was a non-album track, "17", recorded on 11 September 1969, also at Morgan. It later appeared as a bonus track on remastered versions of Stand Up. "Sweet Dream" has appeared on many of the band's compilation albums, while "17" has been rarely seen. In the UK, the single was the first release on Chrysalis Records.

The song was included on the 1972 Warner/Reprise sampler album, The Whole Burbank Catalog. This was the first US release.

== Composition ==
The song is in the key of E minor.

== Music video ==
In 1981, a music video was made for the Slipstream tour. Ian Anderson is dressed up like a vampire and it shows clips from old horror films.

== Charts ==
The song reached number 7 in the UK. On the New Zealand Listener charts it reached number 16.

== Personnel ==
Jethro Tull

- Ian Anderson – flute, 12-string guitar, lead vocals
- Martin Barre – electric guitar
- Glenn Cornick – bass guitar
- Clive Bunker – drums, percussion

Additional musician

- Dee Palmer – arranger and orchestra conductor
