= Stand Up (Jethro Tull album) =

1969 studio album by Jethro Tull

- Cover art by James Grashow

Studio album by Jethro Tull
- Released: 25 July 1969
- Recorded: 17 April – 21 May 1969
- Studios: Morgan, London; Olympic, London
- Genres: Hard rock; folk rock; blues rock
- Length: 37:48
- Labels: Island (UK); Reprise (US)
- Producers: Terry Ellis and Ian Anderson

Jethro Tull chronology
| This Was (1968) | Stand Up (1969) | Benefit (1970) |

Singles from Stand Up
- 1. "Bourée" Released: 13 October 1969

Stand Up, released in 1969, is the second studio album by British rock band Jethro Tull. It was the first Jethro Tull album to feature guitarist Martin Barre, who would go on to become the band's longtime guitarist until their initial dissolution in 2011. Before recording sessions for the album began, the band's original guitarist Mick Abrahams departed from the band as a result of musical differences with frontman and primary songwriter Ian Anderson; Abrahams wanted to stay with the blues rock sound of their 1968 debut, This Was, while Anderson wished to add other musical influences such as folk rock.

As a result of Abrahams' departure, Anderson was the sole songwriter on all of the album's tracks, with the exception of the jazz fusion cover of Johann Sebastian Bach's Bourrée in E minor. Anderson's songwriting sees the album shift musically away from the blues rock of This Was, instead favoring more layered and poignant songs drawing influences from folk artists such as Roy Harper, Pentangle and Bert Jansch. However, the album does retain some blues rock influences on tracks such as side openers "A New Day Yesterday" and "Nothing Is Easy".

The album was released on 25 July 1969, and entered the charts at No. 1 on the UK albums chart on 9 August, following up on the success of the non-album single "Living in the Past", which had reached No. 3 in the UK singles chart on the day the album was released. The album was Jethro Tull's first success in the United States; released in September 1969, it reached No. 20 on the Billboard 200.

== Background ==
Jethro Tull released their debut album This Was in October 1968. During the recording of This Was, frontman Ian Anderson began writing new material which differed from the straight blues/jazz fusion style which the band were known for at the time. Anderson estimated that he wrote "50 percent" of Stand Up during the summer of 1968. Anderson wrote the album's songs on an acoustic guitar in his bedsit in Kentish Town, London, and cited Roy Harper, Ornette Coleman, Charlie Parker, Bert Jansch, Pentangle, Blind Faith and Jimi Hendrix as inspirations. The new material's departure from the band's blues-based style caused conflict with guitarist Mick Abrahams, who was a blues purist: Anderson recalled "running some of [the new songs] by Mick Abrahams, and coming to the conclusion that they weren't going up to be up his street at all" while drummer Clive Bunker stated that "when Ian started to write new and different stuff, that's when we realised we were going to have serious problems, because Mick just didn't want to do it." The stylistic clash resulted in Abrahams' departure from the band in December 1968. Jethro Tull initially began rehearsals for Stand Up with Black Sabbath guitarist Tony Iommi; however, Iommi left the band after only a few weeks, feeling that he did not fit in well with the other members. The job eventually went to Martin Barre, who immediately joined rehearsals for Stand Up before making his live debut with the band on 30 December 1968.

The band then embarked on a short Swedish tour to support Jimi Hendrix in January 1969 before embarking on a three-month U.S. tour (the band's first) during which the band recorded the non-album single "Living in the Past" and B-side "Driving Song" at the behest of manager Terry Ellis to "keep the pot boiling" in the UK. Following the end of the tour in April, the band returned to the UK to begin recording sessions for the new album.

== Recording ==
The album's sessions began on 17 April 1969 with the recording of "A New Day Yesterday", and ended on 21 May 1969 when the band finished "Look Into the Sun". There was a brief pause in early-mid May for the band to embark on a joint headlining tour of the UK and France with Ten Years After. All of the songs were recorded at Studio 2 of Morgan Studios, except for "Bourée" which was recorded at Olympic Studios because Morgan was already booked for the day (although takes of the song were also recorded at Morgan). The routine was that the band would arrive at the studio at 9:00 am to work on one or two songs which would be finished by 4:00 or 5:00 pm. Anderson cited Morgan Studios' modern 8-track recording facilities as "a big help", saying that "8-track was the beginning of that creative freedom without which it would have been much harder to have made the Stand Up album." The band praised recording engineer Andy Johns, whom they found easy to work with. Johns utilized some innovative recording techniques on the album; for example, on "A New Day Yesterday" he achieved a swirling, stereo-shifting guitar effect by swinging an expensive Neumann U67 microphone on its cable in wide circles around the studio.

The majority of the album was recorded live with the entire band, with minimal overdubs, however primarily acoustic songs such as "Look Into the Sun" and "Fat Man" were recorded mostly solo by Anderson. The song "Bourée" proved the most difficult to record, with the band unsatisfied with any of the takes they recorded. The final version of the song was compiled later from several takes, with additional overdubs added by Anderson. Bass guitar on "Look Into the Sun" was recorded by Johns, for bassist Glenn Cornick was not present at the session (Johns' performance was uncredited on the album). One song titled "Early in the Morning" had its backing track recorded but was aborted during the sessions and was never released. The band also recorded the backing track for "Play in Time" during the sessions, a song which would later be finished and released on the band's next album Benefit.

== Album cover ==
The design of the album cover started with a visit to New Haven, Connecticut during a concert tour in late February 1969. Under the direction of producer Terry Ellis, the band met a woodcarver named James Grashow who followed them for a week in order to properly represent them in wood. The resulting gatefold album cover, in a woodcut style designed by Grashow, originally opened up like a children's pop-up book so that a cut-out of the band's personnel stood up, evoking the album's title. Stand Up won New Musical Express's award for best album artwork in 1969. The pop-up was not carried over to the 1973 album reissue, but is now available on the 180 g vinyl issue of the Steven Wilson remixed version of the album, released in 2017.

== Musical style ==
The album still shows a great blues influence, as in the first track "A New Day Yesterday". Some songs on the album exhibit unusual instrumentation, such as "Fat Man", played on a mandolin, and "Jeffery Goes to Leicester Square", played on a balalaika. The acoustic pieces, like "Reasons for Waiting", already show Anderson under the influence of Roy Harper. The instrumental "Bourée" (one of Jethro Tull's popular concert pieces) is a jazzy re-working of "Bourrée in E minor" by Johann Sebastian Bach. On the other hand, "Nothing Is Easy" is a jazz-rock song with drums and electric guitar that contrasts with the acoustic material on the album.

Ian Anderson has speculated that the chord progression in "We Used to Know" was picked up subconsciously by the Eagles when they toured together in 1971 or 1972 and used in their song "Hotel California". However, Don Felder, who wrote the music for "Hotel California", did not join the Eagles until 1974. In a 2016 interview, Anderson stated that the chord progression had likely been used in earlier songs and also called "Hotel California" a "much better song" than "We Used to Know".

== Themes ==
Anderson has described the album's lyrics as composing of a mixture of made up scenarios, occasionally mixed with biographical anecdotes or experiences from his personal life. Songs like "Back to the Family" and "For a Thousand Mothers" were influenced by Anderson's rocky relationship with his parents at the time, while "We Used to Know" describes the band's difficult life of financial hardship before finding success. Anderson has denied that songs concerning relationships such as "A New Day Yesterday", "Look Into the Sun" and "Reasons for Waiting" were inspired by real-life experiences; he has said that "I've always had a feeling that you don't talk about real stuff when it comes to that, and that you shouldn't betray real relationships in songs." Anderson wrote "Fat Man" as a reference to former guitarist Mick Abrahams (who was the largest member of the group) but has denied that the song was intended as an insult. "Jeffrey Goes to Leicester Square" references Anderson's friend Jeffrey Hammond, who was also referenced on This Was and would later join Jethro Tull as bassist in 1970.

== Critical reception and legacy ==
Professional ratings
Review scores
| Source | Rating |
|---|---|
| AllMusic | 4/5 stars |
| The Encyclopedia of Popular Music | 5/5 stars |
| The Rolling Stone Album Guide | 3.5/5 stars |

Stand Up received mixed reviews upon its release, but more recent evaluations praised the album as a whole, for the production and musicianship.

The 1969 Rolling Stone review was quite positive, stating that the album "has a fairly low raunch quotient, true to form, but it is quite marvellous" and also that "the album is not really funky; rather, it is a meticulously crafted work (no sterility implied) which deserves careful listening. At a time when many of the established stars are faltering, it is a particular pleasure to hear an important new voice." The contemporary Disc and Music Echo review was less favourable; it considered the expensive cover the "most impressive" part of the album and Jethro Tull a good live band but still incapable of producing a "musically interesting" release. American critic Robert Christgau reiterated his dislike of the band, but judged the album "adequate" in his Village Voice review.

A retrospective AllMusic review was positive, saying that the band had "solidified their sound" with the album, bringing an "English folk music" influence to several of the songs, atop an overall blues rock foundation. Sean Murphy of PopMatters more emphatically wrote that Stand Up was a "meaningful document from what turned out to be a very transitional moment in rock history... a document created in a rapidly closing artistic window, pre-prog but post-British blues and psychedelic rock." He praised the musicianship of the players and remarked the first examples of "the first-rate lyricist Anderson would quickly become". The Record Collector review highlights how "the album captured the band on a vertiginous upswing, jubilant with confidence following the drafting in of guitarist Martin Barre" and contained "a fresh batch of diverse but uniformly strong compositions".

A variety of rock artists have cited Stand Up as an all-time favourite album, including Pearl Jam's Eddie Vedder, Aerosmith's Tom Hamilton, Joe Bonamassa, and Joe Satriani. Black Francis of Pixies also spoke glowingly of the album, commenting: "Stand Up is the [Jethro Tull] record that moves me the most. It's only their second album and they're still kind of scruffy. There's a heavy rock influence but they had that English thing going on, you know, university dudes who were really into folk music. It didn't seem like an affectation to me – it still seems real". During an interview with BraveWords in 2015, Anderson selected Stand Up as his favourite Tull album: "I suppose if you were to really twist my arm, I would probably go back to 1969, with the Stand Up album, because that was my first album of first really original music. It has a special place in my heart." Barre and Bunker have also ranked it as being among their favorite Tull albums. It was voted number 513 in Colin Larkin's All Time Top 1000 Albums 3rd Edition (2000).

== Releases ==
The album was reissued in 1973 by Chrysalis Records.

In 1989 a MFSL remaster was released, with catalogue number UDCD 524. The booklet featured the pop-up woodcut band.

The album was reissued again in 2001 as a digital remaster, this time with 4 bonus tracks.

It was reissued on 5 October 2010 as a deluxe edition, including six bonus tracks on disc one, and two additional discs: a CD of live material recorded at Carnegie Hall on 4 November 1970, and a DVD with a DTS surround mix of the concert as well as an Interview with Ian Anderson. The material was mixed by Peter Mew at the Abbey Road studios.

It was released again in November 2016 in a box set with two CDs and one DVD, named Stand Up – The Elevated Edition. The box contains rare and previously unreleased music (such as an alternate take of "Bourée", BBC tracks, radio spots and vintage stereo promo mixes of "Living in the Past" and "Driving Song" previously unreleased on CD) including new stereo and 5.1 mixes of the album and bonus tracks by Steven Wilson, and a live presentation, from a concert in Sweden in 1969 (original mono mix). It also includes a 112-page booklet featuring track-by-track annotations by Ian Anderson, an extensive history of the album, rare and unseen photographs and a reproduction of the original pop-up book artwork designed by James Grashow.

It was re-released again on 180-gram vinyl with the original tracks in February 2017. This time it came with the gatefold cover and the "pop up" band inside.

The album was again re-issued on two LPs at 45 rpm in October 2022 by Analogue Productions. This issue was mastered and cut by Kevin Gray from the original UK Island analogue tape, and plated at QRP with an initial press run at RTI. The gatefold "tip on" jacket, manufactured by Stoughton Printing, faithfully reproduced the original pop-up of the band members from the initial release.

== Track listings ==
All songs written by Ian Anderson, unless otherwise indicated. (Original LP album states "All titles written by Ian Anderson").

=== 1969 original release ===
Side one
| No. | Title | Writer(s) | Length |
|---|---|---|---|
| 1. | "A New Day Yesterday" | | 4:10 |
| 2. | "Jeffrey Goes to Leicester Square" | | 2:12 |
| 3. | "Bourée" (Instrumental) | J. S. Bach; arranged by Ian Anderson | 3:46 |
| 4. | "Back to the Family" | | 3:48 |
| 5. | "Look into the Sun" | | 4:20 |

Side two
| No. | Title | Length |
|---|---|---|
| 1. | "Nothing Is Easy" | 4:25 |
| 2. | "Fat Man" | 2:52 |
| 3. | "We Used to Know" | 4:00 |
| 4. | "Reasons for Waiting" | 4:05 |
| 5. | "For a Thousand Mothers" | 4:13 |
| Total length: | | 37:48 |

- The 1973 cassette version has the same track order, but on opposite sides.
- Sides one and two were combined as tracks 1–10 on CD reissues.

2001 remaster bonus tracks
| No. | Title | Length |
|---|---|---|
| 11. | "Living in the Past" | 3:23 |
| 12. | "Driving Song" | 2:44 |
| 13. | "Sweet Dream" | 4:05 |
| 14. | "17" | 3:07 |

=== 2010 collector's edition (2 CD discs + 1 DVD) ===
CD 1: Remastered album and bonus tracks
| No. | Title | Length |
|---|---|---|
| 1. | "A New Day Yesterday" (2001 Digital Remaster) | 4:07 |
| 2. | "Jeffrey Goes to Leicester Square" (2001 Digital Remaster) | 2:09 |
| 3. | "Bourée" (2001 Digital Remaster) | 3:44 |
| 4. | "Back to the Family" (2001 Digital Remaster) | 3:48 |
| 5. | "Look into the Sun" (2001 Digital Remaster) | 4:18 |
| 6. | "Nothing Is Easy" (2001 Digital Remaster) | 4:22 |
| 7. | "Fat Man" (2001 Digital Remaster) | 2:49 |
| 8. | "We Used to Know" (2001 Digital Remaster) | 3:58 |
| 9. | "Reason for Waiting" (2001 Digital Remaster) | 4:03 |
| 10. | "For a Thousand Mothers" (2001 Digital Remaster) | 4:13 |
| 11. | "Living in the Past" (2001 Digital Remaster) | 3:19 |
| 12. | "Driving Song" (2001 Digital Remaster) | 2:38 |
| 13. | "Sweet Dream" (2001 Digital Remaster) | 4:01 |
| 14. | "17" (2001 Digital Remaster) | 6:09 |
| 15. | "Living in the Past" (Original Mono Single Version; 2001 Digital Remaster) | 3:22 |
| 16. | "Bourée" (John Peel Session, 16 June 1969) | 3:57 |
| 17. | "A New Day Yesterday" (John Peel Session, 16 June 1969) | 4:13 |
| 18. | "Nothing Is Easy" (John Peel Session, 16 June 1969) | 5:03 |
| 19. | "Fat Man" (John Peel Session, 16 June 1969) | 2:53 |
| 20. | "Stand Up (US Radio Spot #1)" (2010 Digital Remaster) | 1:02 |
| 21. | "Stand Up (US Radio Spot #2)" (2010 Digital Remaster) | 0:51 |
| Total length: | | 74:59 |

CD 2: Live at Carnegie Hall, New York, 4 November 1970
| No. | Title | Writer(s) | Length |
|---|---|---|---|
| 1. | "Nothing Is Easy" | | 5:43 |
| 2. | "My God" | | 12:43 |
| 3. | "With You There to Help Me" / "By Kind Permission Of" | Ian Anderson, John Evan | 13:34 |
| 4. | "A Song for Jeffrey" | | 5:25 |
| 5. | "To Cry You a Song" | | 6:03 |
| 6. | "Sossity, You're a Woman" / "Reasons for Waiting" / "Sossity, You're a Woman" | | 5:28 |
| 7. | "Dharma for One" | Ian Anderson, Clive Bunker | 13:37 |
| 8. | "We Used to Know" | | 3:41 |
| 9. | "Guitar Solo" | Martin Barre | 8:24 |
| 10. | "For a Thousand Mothers" | | 4:43 |
| Total length: | | | 79:21 |

DVD: Live at Carnegie Hall, New York, 4 November 1970 (5.1 surround mix) and Ian Anderson interview
| No. | Title | Length |
|---|---|---|
| 1. | "Introduction" | 1:26 |
| 2. | "Nothing Is Easy" | 7:41 |
| 3. | "My God" | 14:34 |
| 4. | "With You There to Help Me" / "By Kind Permission Of"" | 15:26 |
| 5. | "A Song for Jeffrey" | 7:07 |
| 6. | "To Cry You a Song" | 6:43 |
| 7. | "Sossity, You're a Woman" / "Reasons for Waiting" / "Sossity, You're a Woman" | 8:53 |
| 8. | "Dharma for One" | 23:20 |
| 9. | "We Used to Know" | 4:03 |
| 10. | "Guitar Solo" | 8:23 |
| 11. | "For a Thousand Mothers" | 4:50 |
| 12. | "Interview with Ian Anderson, London 2010" |

=== 2016 The Elevated Edition ===
CD 1: Steven Wilson stereo remix of the album and associated recordings
| No. | Title | Length |
|---|---|---|
| 1. | "A New Day Yesterday" | 4:11 |
| 2. | "Jeffrey Goes to Leicester Square" | 2:13 |
| 3. | "Bourée" | 3:48 |
| 4. | "Back to the Family" | 3:54 |
| 5. | "Look into the Sun" | 4:37 |
| 6. | "Nothing Is Easy" | 4:27 |
| 7. | "Fat Man" | 2:52 |
| 8. | "We Used to Know" | 4:04 |
| 9. | "Reasons for Waiting" | 4:07 |
| 10. | "For a Thousand Mothers" | 4:19 |
| 11. | "Living in the Past" | 3:25 |
| 12. | "Driving Song" | 2:50 |
| 13. | "Bourée (Morgan Version)" | 4:18 |
| 14. | "Living in the Past" (Original 1969 Stereo Single Mix) | 3:27 |
| 15. | "Driving Song" (Original 1969 Stereo Single Mix) | 2:48 |
| 16. | "A New Day Yesterday" (Mono BBC Session) | 4:17 |
| 17. | "Fat Man" (Mono BBC Session) | 2:56 |
| 18. | "Nothing Is Easy" (Mono BBC Session) | 5:06 |
| 19. | "Bourée" (Mono BBC Session) | 4:02 |

CD 2: Live at Stockholm Konserthuset, 9 January 1969 concert and associated recordings
| No. | Title | Length |
|---|---|---|
| 1. | "Introduction" | 0:21 |
| 2. | "My Sunday Feeling" | 4:46 |
| 3. | "Martin's Tune" | 12:08 |
| 4. | "To Be Sad Is a Mad Way to Be" | 4:00 |
| 5. | "Back to the Family" | 4:07 |
| 6. | "Dharma for One" | 14:14 |
| 7. | "Nothing Is Easy" | 15:28 |
| 8. | "A Song for Jeffrey" | 3:57 |
| 9. | "To Be Sad Is a Mad Way to Be" (First Show Version) | 4:06 |
| 10. | "Living in the Past" (Original 1969 Mono Single Mix) | 3:27 |
| 11. | "Driving Song" (Original 1969 mono Single Mix) | 2:52 |
| 12. | "Stand Up radio spot #1" | 1:06 |
| 13. | "Stand Up radio spot #2" | 0:52 |

DVD: Steven Wilson 5.1 surround and stereo mixes and flat transfer of the original stereo album and associated recordings mixes and film footage from Live at the Stockholm Konserthuset, 9 January 1969
| No. | Title | Length |
|---|---|---|
| 1. | "A New Day Yesterday" (5.1 Surround Mix) | 4:11 |
| 2. | "Jeffrey Goes to Leicester Square" (5.1 Surround Mix) | 2:13 |
| 3. | "Bourée" (5.1 Surround Mix) | 3:48 |
| 4. | "Back to the Family" (5.1 Surround Mix) | 3:54 |
| 5. | "Look into the Sun" (5.1 Surround Mix) | 4:37 |
| 6. | "Nothing Is Easy" (5.1 Surround Mix) | 4:27 |
| 7. | "Fat Man" (5.1 Surround Mix) | 2:52 |
| 8. | "We Used to Know" (5.1 Surround Mix) | 4:04 |
| 9. | "Reasons for Waiting" (5.1 Surround Mix) | 4:07 |
| 10. | "For a Thousand Mothers" (5.1 Surround Mix) | 4:19 |
| 11. | "Living in the Past" (5.1 Surround Mix) | 3:25 |
| 12. | "Driving Song" (5.1 Surround Mix) | 2:50 |
| 13. | "Bourée (Morgan Version)" (5.1 Surround Mix) | 4:18 |
| 14. | "A New Day Yesterday" (2016 Stereo Mix) | 4:11 |
| 15. | "Jeffrey Goes to Leicester Square" (2016 Stereo Mix) | 2:13 |
| 16. | "Bourée" (2016 Stereo Mix) | 3:48 |
| 17. | "Back to the Family" (2016 Stereo Mix) | 3:54 |
| 18. | "Look into the Sun" (2016 Stereo Mix) | 4:37 |
| 19. | "Nothing Is Easy" (2016 Stereo Mix) | 4:27 |
| 20. | "Fat Man" (2016 Stereo Mix) | 2:52 |
| 21. | "We Used to Know" (2016 Stereo Mix) | 4:04 |
| 22. | "Reasons for Waiting" (2016 Stereo Mix) | 4:07 |
| 23. | "For a Thousand Mothers" (2016 Stereo Mix) | 4:19 |
| 24. | "Living in the Past" (2016 Stereo Mix) | 3:25 |
| 25. | "Driving Song" (2016 Stereo Mix) | 2:50 |
| 26. | "Bourée (Morgan Version)" (2016 Stereo Mix) | 4:18 |
| 27. | "A New Day Yesterday" (Original Stereo Mix) | 4:11 |
| 28. | "Jeffrey Goes to Leicester Square" (Original Stereo Mix) | 2:13 |
| 29. | "Bourée" (Original Stereo Mix) | 3:48 |
| 30. | "Back to the Family" (Original Stereo Mix) | 3:54 |
| 31. | "Look into the Sun" (Original Stereo Mix) | 4:37 |
| 32. | "Nothing Is Easy" (Original Stereo Mix) | 4:27 |
| 33. | "Fat Man" (Original Stereo Mix) | 2:52 |
| 34. | "We Used to Know" (Original Stereo Mix) | 4:04 |
| 35. | "Reasons for Waiting" (Original Stereo Mix) | 4:07 |
| 36. | "For a Thousand Mothers" (Original Stereo Mix) | 4:19 |
| 37. | "Living in the Past" (Original Stereo Mix) | 3:25 |
| 38. | "Driving Song" (Original Stereo Mix) | 2:50 |
| 39. | "Living in the Past" (Original Mono Mix) | 3:25 |
| 40. | "Driving Song" (Original Mono Mix) | 2:50 |
| 41. | "Film footage recorded 9 January 1969 at the Stockholm Konserthuset of the songs "To Be Sad Is a Mad Way to Be" and "Back to the Family"" | 7:10 |

== Personnel ==
Jethro Tull

- Ian Anderson – vocals, flute, acoustic guitar, Hammond organ (tracks 9 and 10), piano (tracks 5 and 9), mandolin (tracks 7 and 9), balalaika (tracks 7 and 9), harmonica (tracks 1 and 9), production
- Martin Barre – electric guitar, additional flute (on tracks 2 and 9)
- Glenn Cornick – bass guitar (all tracks but 5 and 7)
- Clive Bunker – drums, percussion

Production

- Terry Ellis – production, cover concept
- Andy Johns – engineer, bass guitar on track 5 (uncredited)
- Dee Palmer – string arrangements and conductor on track 9
- John Williams – cover concept
- James Grashow – cover art

== Charts ==
Chart performance for Stand Up
| Chart (1969–1970) | Peak position |
|---|---|
| Australian Albums (Kent Music Report) | 12 |
| Canada Top Albums/CDs (RPM) | 20 |
| Danish Albums (Hitlisten) | 5 |
| Dutch Albums (Album Top 100) | 2 |
| Finnish Albums (The Official Finnish Charts) | 3 |
| German Albums (Offizielle Top 100) | 5 |
| Norwegian Albums (VG-lista) | 5 |
| UK Albums (Official Charts) | 1 |
| US Billboard 200 | 20 |

2008 chart performance for Stand Up
| Chart (2008) | Peak position |
|---|---|
| Italian Albums (FIMI) | 92 |

| Chart (2016) | Peak position |
|---|---|
| Scottish Albums (Official Charts) | 99 |
| UK Rock & Metal Albums (Official Charts) | 9 |

== Certifications ==
Certifications for Stand Up
| Region | Certification | Certified units/sales |
|---|---|---|
| United Kingdom (BPI) release of 2016 | Silver | 60,000^{‡} |
| United States (RIAA) | Gold | 500,000^{^} |
^{^} Shipments figures based on certification alone.^{‡} Sales+streaming figures based on certification alone.
