= Terry Ellis (music producer) =

English manager

- Born: 14 August 1943 (age 83); Welwyn Garden City, Hertfordshire, England
- Years active: 1968–present
- Labels: Chrysalis; Imago

Terry Ellis (born 14 August 1943) is an English record producer and manager who worked with the early Jethro Tull band, and as co-founder of music company Chrysalis Records in 1969.

Ellis was born in Welwyn Garden City, Hertfordshire, England, in 1943. He graduated from the university of Newcastle upon Tyne with an honours degree in mathematics and metallurgy. He began booking concerts at colleges on a part-time basis in 1966, and in 1967 he got into business with Chris Wright, forming the Ellis-Wright Agency. The act that brought them attention was Reparata and the Delrons whose record in the UK, "Captain of Your Ship" was climbing the charts. Ellis brought the group to England for two successful tours in 1968. For many years, he kept their file open, deeming it good luck. In 1968 they also expanded their activities to include artist management with Ellis managing Clouds and Jethro Tull, and Chris managing Ten Years After and Procol Harum. He co-produced several Jethro Tull records: This Was (1968), Stand Up (1969), Benefit (1970) and Aqualung (1971).

After buying out Ellis in 1985, Wright sold the Chrysalis Records label to EMI in 1991, and finally sold the entire operation to a consortium consisting of BMG and private equity firm Kohlberg Kravis Roberts in 2010.

== Career ==
Ellis took a science degree at university, but while there he took the position of Social Secretary of the Students Union and presented pop and rock groups at his university for the first time. Later he began writing music journalism for his college paper. In 1965, his attempt at interviewing Bob Dylan was filmed for D.A. Pennebaker's film Dont Look Back; Dylan is shown in an intellectual joust with Ellis in a circular conversation that is at times good natured, and at other times tense.

Subsequently, Ellis developed one of the most successful track records in contemporary music for discovering, developing and exploiting the commercial potential of young recording artists. With his partner, Chris Wright, he built a small artist booking agency into one of the most successful independent groups of companies in the music industry with subsidiaries involved in artist management, booking, recording studios, record labels, music publishing, concert promotion and venue management. In one capacity or another their company, Chrysalis, represented every important influence in British music in the 1970s. In addition to artists that it directly managed, Chrysalis booked Led Zeppelin, Jeff Beck, Roxy Music, Curved Air, Yes and King Crimson, signed David Bowie to a music publishing contract, entered the recording studio business with Sir George Martin (The Beatles producer), directed concert tours and for a time ran London's Rainbow Theatre.

By 1969 Ellis had started to produce albums. One record which influenced him was "Classical Gas" for its amazing orchestration. His productions include all of the early Jethro Tull albums and based on their success, he and his partner formed Chrysalis Records. The label established itself with artists such as Jethro Tull, Clouds, Ten Years After, Procol Harum, Robin Trower, Leo Sayer, Spandau Ballet, Steeleye Span and numerous others who achieved success through Chrysalis and its licensees around the world.

By the end of 1974, Chrysalis was firmly established as one of the leading independent record labels and music publishers in the world. Ellis moved to Los Angeles to build the American arm of the group and to give it a more focused identity. He continued to build on Chrysalis's track record for credible music whilst applying his philosophy of maintaining a close personal involvement with all aspects of his signed artists' careers. By way of examples, having seen an unknown New York based punk rock group, he purchased their contract from a small record label that could not afford to market them properly. That group was Blondie, and their first single on Chrysalis "Rip Her to Shreds" (1976) was a hit in 35 countries.

Also in New York, he heard Pat Benatar in a small club; with Chrysalis, she went on to sell millions of records, as did Huey Lewis and The News, a rock band from San Francisco. After the breakup of UK punk band, Generation X, Ellis took the lead singer to America and launched the career of Billy Idol. In each of these cases, and there are others, the common factor was Ellis' personal devotion of time, effort and career planning that took the artists to international success. Yet it is ironic that the first band he ever signed to management, Clouds, had their career founder because of lack of management supervision. This was mainly bad luck and timing, for the Chrysalis empire began to rapidly expand at that very moment, and the success of Jethro Tull also meant that Ellis could not devote the time he typically wanted to spend on his artistes.

In 1980, Ellis set up a new Chrysalis division, Chrysalis Visual Programming. He made the music industry's first ever sell-through long form VHS video album with Blondie's Eat to the Beat (1980) (which was re-released in a remastered limited edition CD/DVD release in late June 2007). He went on to produce other long form videos including one featuring Scottish comedian, Billy Connolly, produced two made-for-TV movies and developed the award-winning TV series Max Headroom (TV series) (1987–88), still considered by critics on both sides of the Atlantic to be one of the most innovative television series in recent history.

Ellis was elected Chairman of the Recording Industry Association of America (RIAA) for a two-year term and remains the only non-American to have been elected to this office. He has also held the Chairmanship of the British Phonographic Industry (BPI) and served for five years as a member of the International Federation of the Phonographic Industry (IFPI). In 1985, Ellis dissolved his association with Chrysalis selling his interests to his partner. Within a few years, the record division, which he had been very influential in creating, had been sold off to EMI Records.

In 1990, Ellis formed Imago Records (The Imago Recording Company), a joint venture with BMG. In its four years of operation he signed six artists who sold over 100,000 units of their debut album in the US alone: Baby Animals, Captain Hollywood, The Rollins Band, Aimee Mann, Paula Cole, and Love Spit Love. Of those, Baby Animals' first record sold 500,000 worldwide (4 times platinum in Australia) and the Rollins Band sold 250,000 units in the US on their first and 500,000 on their second albums. The joint venture was dissolved in 1994 with Ellis retaining ownership of the Imago catalogue and artist contracts.

Paula Cole's second album has had two US top ten singles and has achieved double platinum status; that is sales of 2 million units. She was nominated for Grammy Awards in seven major categories including "Album of the Year", "Song of the Year", "Record of the Year" and "Producer of the Year", She was awarded the Grammy for "Best New Artist".

Ellis and his French wife Daniele live in the British Virgin Islands and New York. He is a member of the Metropolitan Opera Club of New York City and has served on its board of directors. As Chairman of the BPI in 1990, Ellis was responsible for the establishment of the BRIT School of Performing Arts in Croydon, Surrey, funded by British Recording Industry Trust.

In 2015, he was a speaker at the Music Matters conference in Singapore.
