= Glenn Cornick =

British bass player (1947–2014)

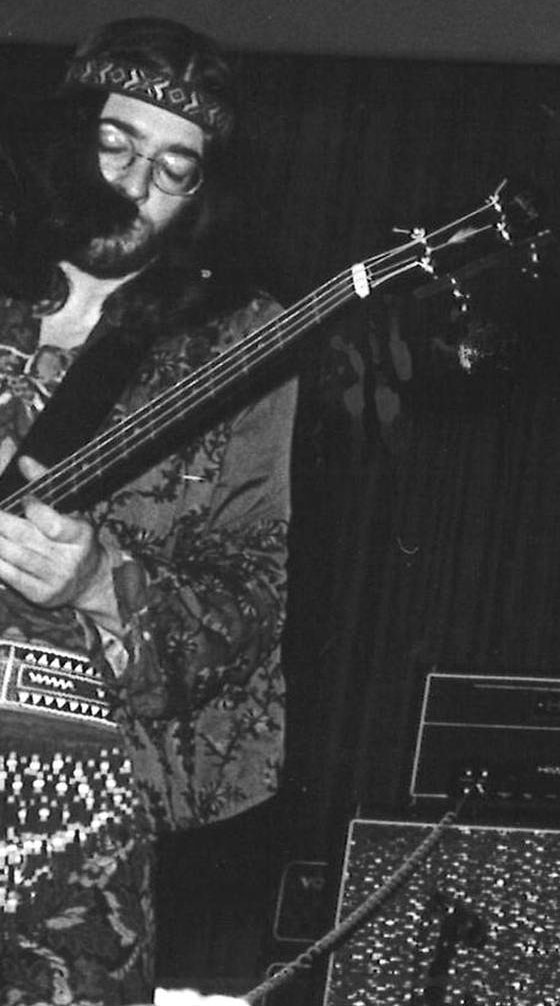
- Cornick performing with Jethro Tull in Helsinki, 1970.

Background information
- Born: Glenn Douglas Barnard Cornick; 23 April 1947; Barrow-in-Furness, Lancashire, England
- Died: 28 August 2014 (aged 67) Hilo, Hawaii, United States
- Genres: Rock, blues rock
- Occupation: Musician
- Instrument: Bass guitar
- Years active: 1962–1977, 1996–2014
- Label: Chrysalis
- Formerly of: Jethro Tull, Wild Turkey, Paris, Karthago

Glenn Douglas Barnard Cornick (23 April 1947 – 28 August 2014) was an English bass guitarist, and the original bassist for the British rock band Jethro Tull from 1967 to 1970. Rolling Stone has called his playing with Tull as "stout, nimble underpinning, the vital half of a blues-ribbed, jazz-fluent rhythm section".

== Early life and career ==
Cornick attended Barrow-in-Furness Grammar School for Boys, and then moved to Blackpool. The first group he played with was "The Executives", a group that played versions of famous songs in clubs and pubs. Later, he joined a soul band called John Evan Smash in which Ian Anderson and guitarist Mick Abrahams were also members. Drummer Clive Bunker, who was a friend of Abrahams, then joined them to form Jethro Tull.

== Jethro Tull ==
Cornick toured and recorded with Jethro Tull from late 1967 to late 1970. He played on the band's first three albums, This Was, Stand Up and Benefit, playing a role in the arranging of the music, being one of the few members of Jethro Tull with some musical training. One of the few live recordings of Cornick with Jethro Tull is the video Nothing Is Easy: Live at the Isle of Wight 1970, recorded in 1970 and released in 2004. He was fired from the band, mainly because his lifestyle was more inclined to partying than other members'.

== Wild Turkey ==
After leaving Jethro Tull, Cornick played as a session musician for Leigh Stephens on his 1971 album And a Cast of Thousands. In the same year, he formed Wild Turkey, initially with: Graham Williams (guitar), Alan 'Tweke' Lewis (guitar), John "Pugwash" Weathers (ex-Pete Brown & Piblokto! and later in Gentle Giant) on drums and Gary Pickford-Hopkins (ex-Eyes of Blue) on vocals; but Weathers and Williams left to join Graham Bond's Magick before Wild Turkey recorded any material – soon after, Weathers joined the progressive rock band Gentle Giant. They were replaced by Jon Blackmore (guitar and vocals) and Jeff Jones (ex-Man) (drums) who joined Cornick, Tweke and Pickford-Hopkins to record Wild Turkey's first album Battle Hymn – which only reached number 193 in The Billboard 200. The band released a second album, Turkey, before splitting up.

== Karthago and Paris ==
Cornick then joined the German band Karthago, with whom he recorded just one album, Rock'N'Roll Testament, before leaving and moving to Los Angeles to form Paris, with guitarist Bob Welch (ex-Fleetwood Mac) and Thom Mooney (ex-Nazz) on drums. They recorded an eponymous album, Paris, in 1975, before Mooney was replaced by Hunt Sales (ex-Todd Rundgren's Runt), and in 1976 recorded Big Towne, 2061. Paris disbanded in 1977.

== Wild Turkey again, the 1990s and 2000s ==
In 1996, Cornick participated in a Jethro Tull tribute album, called To Cry You A Song – A collection of Tull Tales, playing on the songs "Nothing Is Easy", "To Cry You a Song", "New Day Yesterday", "Teacher" and "Living in the Past", together with the former Tull members Clive Bunker, Mick Abrahams and Dave Pegg, together with John Wetton, Glenn Hughes, Robby Steinhardt, Wolfstone and Keith Emerson.

In the early 2000s two live Wild Turkey albums were released, Final Performance (2000) and Live in Edinburgh (2001) and in 2006 the fourth studio album, You and Me in the Jungle, was recorded by Cornick, Pickford-Hopkins, Dyche and Gurl, who had all appeared on earlier albums. They were joined by Graham Williams (ex-Racing Cars) (guitar), John "Pugwash" Weathers (percussion) and former Jethro Tull drummer Clive Bunker, all of whom had played with Cornick in the past.

== Death ==
Cornick died in Hilo, Hawaii, on 28 August 2014, due to congestive heart failure.

His death was widely reported in the media and specialist publications like Prog magazine and Rolling Stone. Jethro Tull bandmate Ian Anderson paid tribute on the band's website. Martin Barre also lamented the death of his friend.

== Discography ==
=== With Jethro Tull ===
- This Was (1968)
- Stand Up (1969)
- Benefit (1970)
- Living in the Past (1972 compilation)
- Nothing is Easy - Live at the Isle of Wight (1970 - released in 2004)
- Live at Carnegie Hall 1970 (1970 - released in 2015)

=== With Wild Turkey ===
- Battle Hymn (1971)
- Turkey (1972)
- Don't Dare To Forget (1974) (three new tracks on a four-disc sampler)
- Stealer of Years (1996)
- Final Performance (2000)
- Live in Edinburgh (2001)
- You & Me in the Jungle (2006)

=== With Karthago ===
- Rock 'N' Roll Testament (1975) Bellaphon 288-09-036

=== With Paris ===
- Paris (1976) - Zoom Club ZCRCD56
- Big Towne, 2061 (1976) - Zoom Club ZCRCD62
