= List of Jethro Tull members =

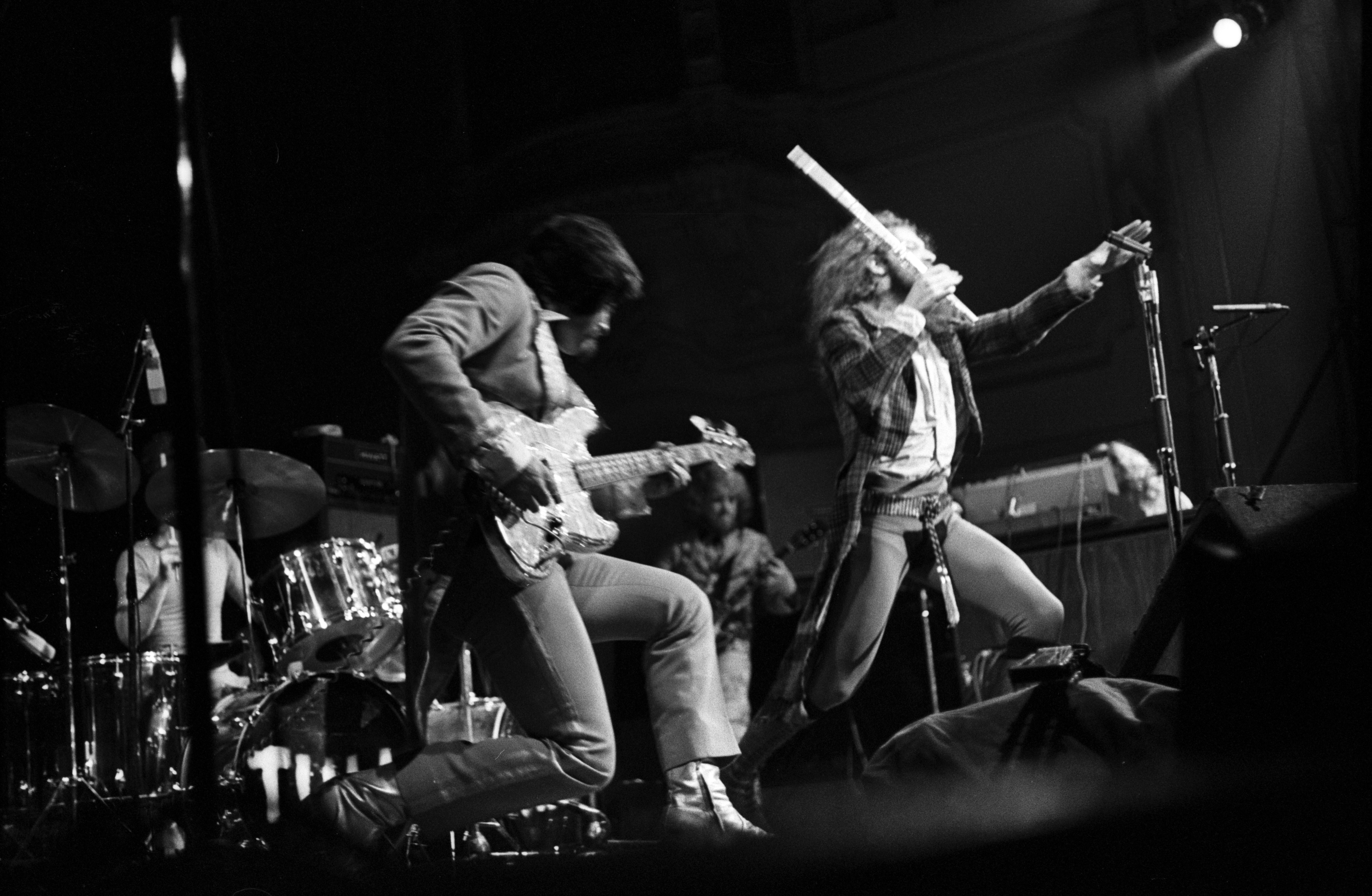
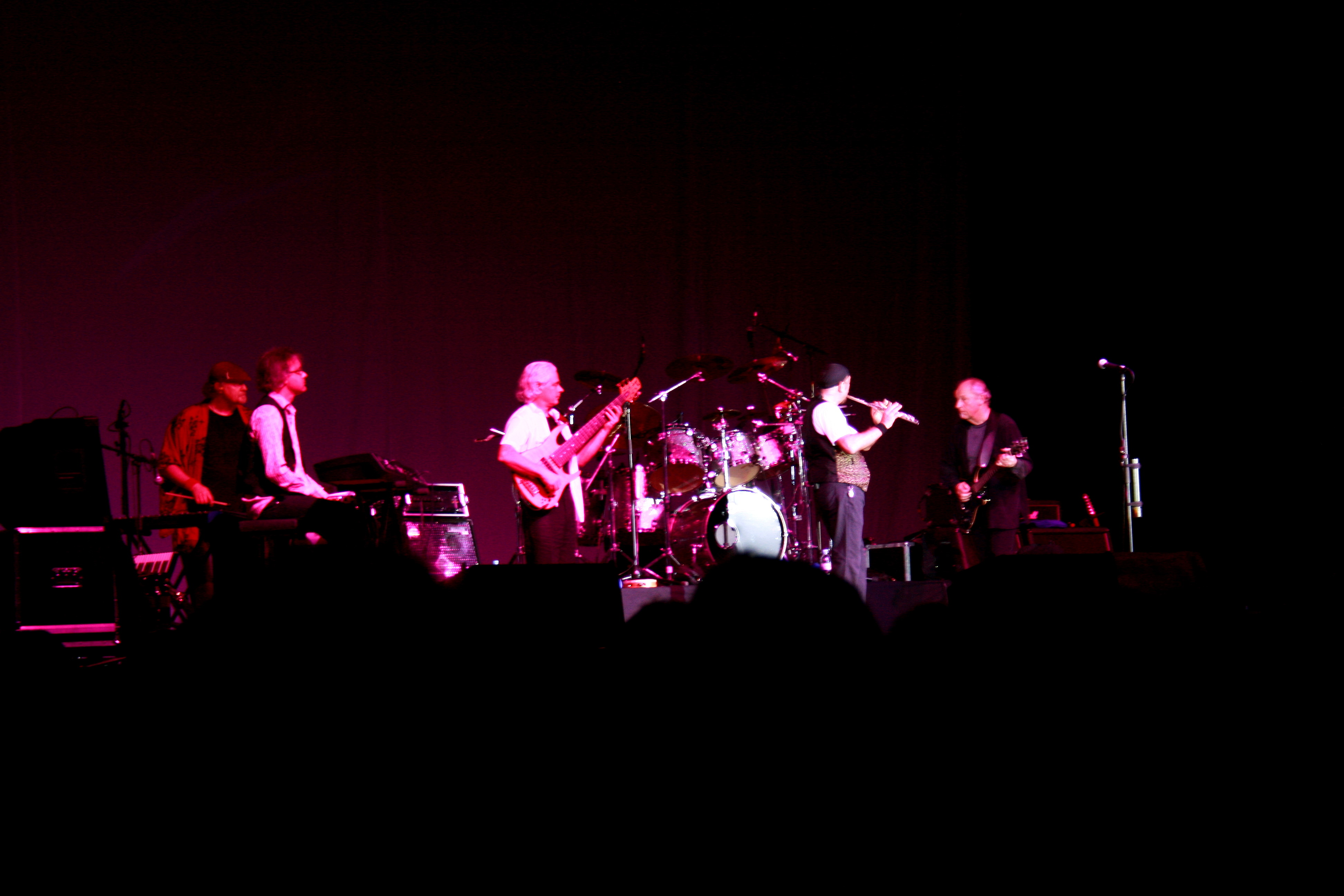
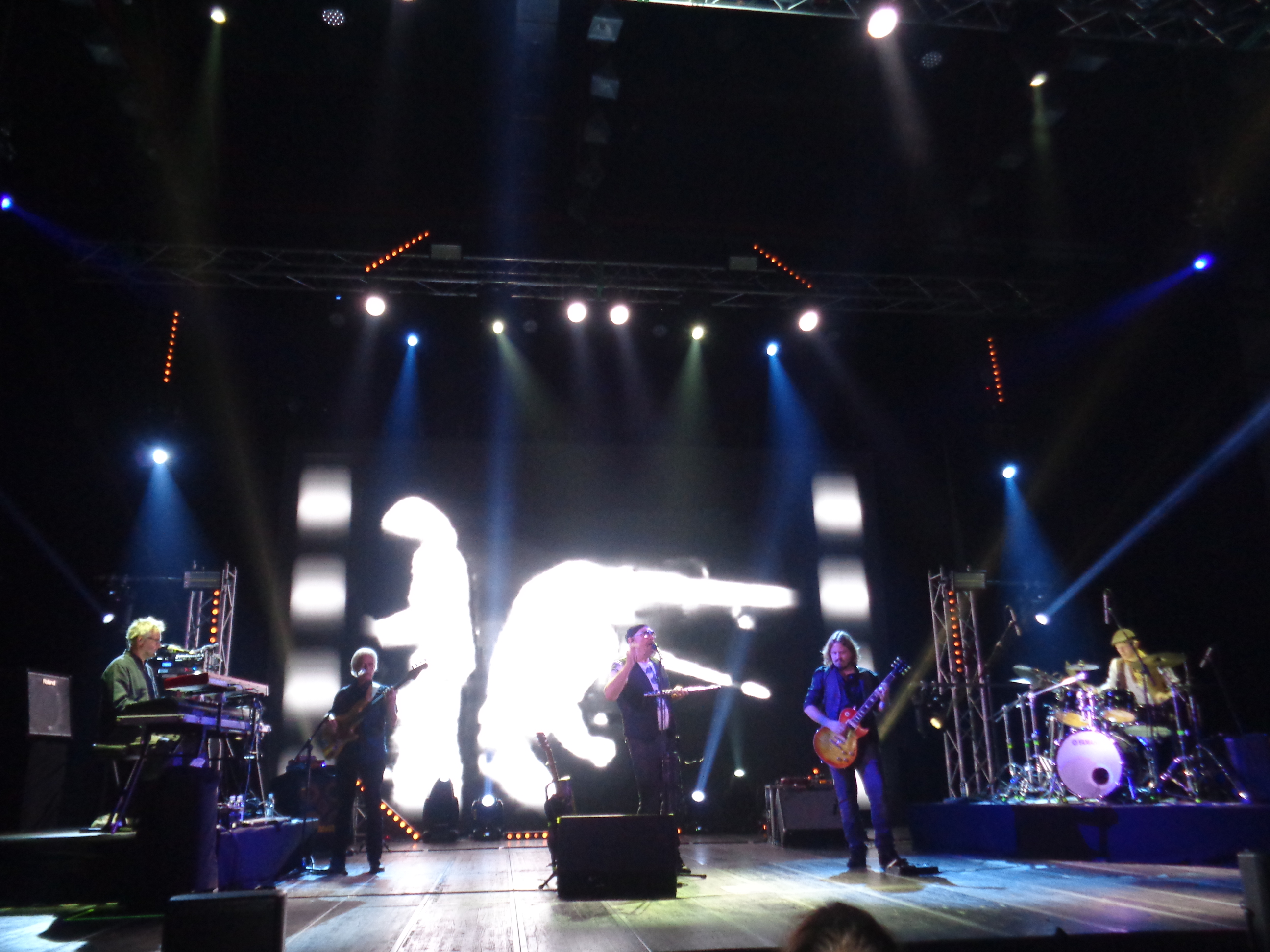
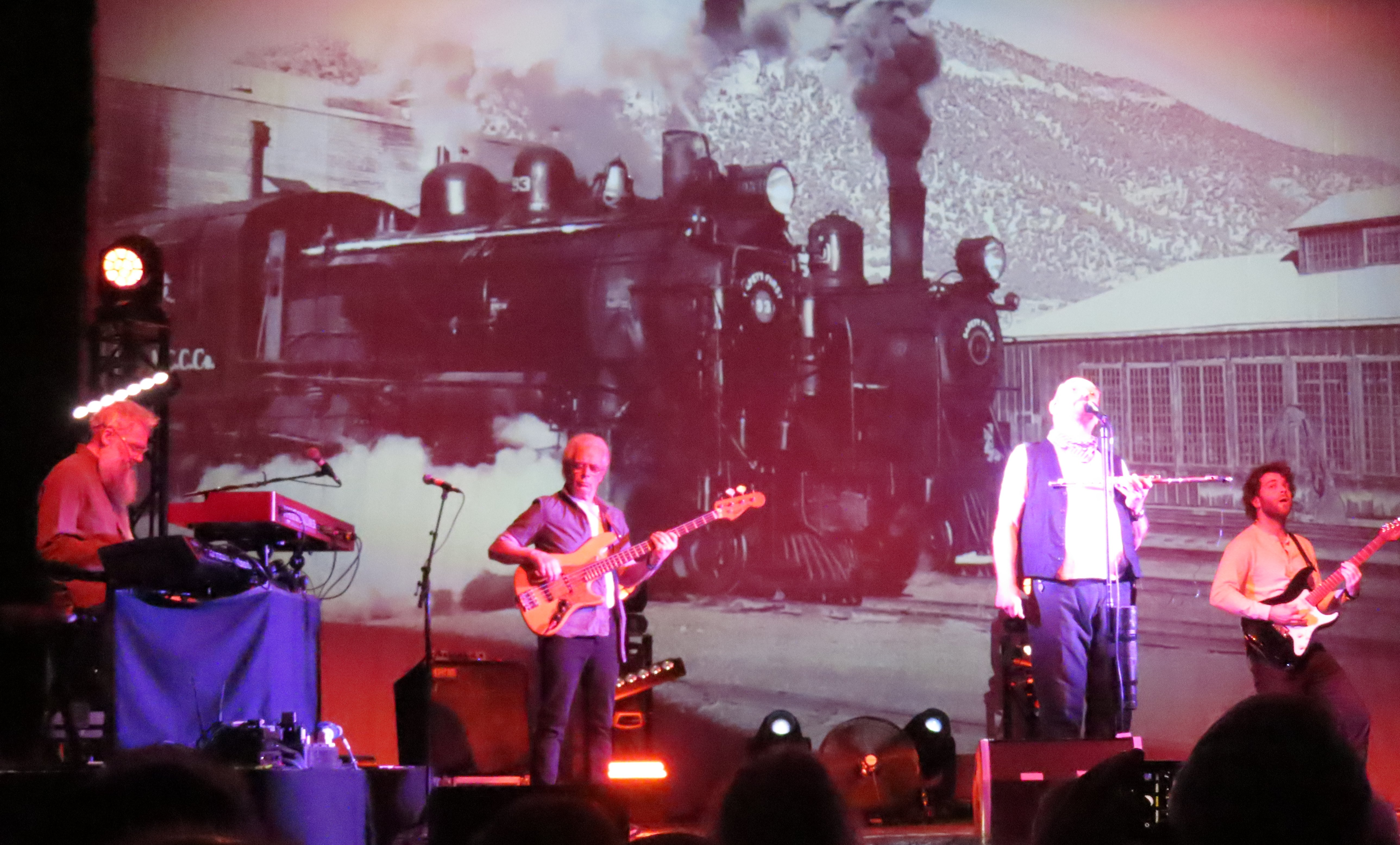
Jethro Tull performing in 1973, 2009, 2016 and 2024.

Jethro Tull are an English progressive rock band from Blackpool. Formed in December 1967, the group originally included vocalist and flautist Ian Anderson, guitarist and backing vocalist Mick Abrahams, bassist Glenn Cornick and drummer Clive Bunker. Other long-running members include guitarist Martin Barre, who played on all but the first and most recent studio albums, drummer Doane Perry, who was with the group for 28 years, and bassist Dave Pegg, who was with the group almost 16 years.

The group's current lineup includes Anderson, bassist David Goodier, keyboardist John O'Hara, drummer Scott Hammond and guitarist Jack Clark.

== History ==
=== 1967–1981 ===
Jethro Tull are an English progressive rock band from Blackpool. Formed in December 1967, the group originally included vocalist and flautist Ian Anderson, guitarist and vocalist Mick Abrahams, bassist Glenn Cornick and drummer Clive Bunker. After contributing to the band's debut album This Was, Abrahams left Jethro Tull in December 1968, citing disagreements with the band's "basic policies, both musically and otherwise". He was replaced before the end of the year by Martin Barre, after rehearsals and stand-in performances by David O'List and Tony Iommi. Keyboardist John Evan was added to the band's lineup in April 1970, after contributing to Benefit as a guest performer. By the end of the year, Cornick had left the band due to "musical differences", with Jeffrey Hammond-Hammond taking his place. Anderson was left as the sole original member of the group by May 1971, when Bunker also left due to their heavy touring schedule. He was replaced by Barriemore Barlow.

After contributing to five albums with Jethro Tull, Hammond-Hammond retired from music in December 1975, with John Glascock taking his place. Dee Palmer (then known as David) was added to the group as a second keyboardist in 1977, having contributed orchestral arrangements to every studio album to date. During the recording of Stormwatch in 1979, Glascock was dismissed from the band due to increasing health problems, with Anderson recording the majority of the album's bass parts. Dave Pegg replaced Glascock for the album's promotional tour, before the former bassist died of complications from heart surgery on 17 November 1979. Following the conclusion of the tour, Barlow, Evan and Palmer departed, with new drummer Mark Craney and "special guest" keyboardist Eddie Jobson joining in early 1980.

=== 1981 onwards ===
Craney and Jobson both left after the A tour in 1981, with their places taken by Gerry Conway and Peter-John Vettese, respectively. Conway left after performing on 1982's The Broadsword and the Beast and the European leg of the album's tour, with Paul Burgess brought in to complete US dates later in the year. In 1984, Doane Perry joined as Conway's permanent replacement after the recording of Under Wraps. The group was placed on temporary hiatus during the mid-1980s as Anderson dealt with throat problems, before returning in 1987 (without Vettese) on Crest of a Knave. Maartin Allcock took over as the band's keyboardist in 1988, remaining until 1991 when Andrew Giddings took his place. Pegg left in 1995 to focus on Fairport Convention, with Jonathan Noyce brought in later as his replacement.

The lineup of Jethro Tull remained stable until 2007, when Noyce and Giddings left the group and were replaced by Anderson's solo bandmates David Goodier and John O'Hara, respectively. Anderson began focusing on releasing and touring under his own name in 2011, when Jethro Tull was essentially disbanded. In August 2017, it was announced that Jethro Tull would return for a tour the following year to mark the 50th anniversary of their debut album This Was, with Anderson solo band members Florian Opahle (guitar) and Scott Hammond (drums) joining the frontman alongside Goodier and O'Hara. In late 2019, Opahle left the band to concentrate on production work and family. He was replaced by Joe Parrish, who was in time replaced by Jack Clark in 2024, who had previously toured with the band as a substitute for Goodier and O'Hara.

== Members ==
=== Current ===
Image	Name	Years active	Instruments	Release contributions
	Ian Anderson	1967–2011; 2017–present	lead vocals; flute; rhythm and acoustic guitar; keyboards; piano; harmonica; mandolin; occasional saxophone, bass, violin and trumpet	all Jethro Tull releases
	David Goodier	2007–2011; 2017–present	bass; double bass; backing vocals	The Best of Acoustic Jethro Tull (2007); Live at AVO Session Basel (2009); all releases from The Zealot Gene (2022) onwards
	John O'Hara	2007–2011; 2017–present	keyboards; accordion; backing vocals	The Best of Acoustic Jethro Tull (2007); Live at AVO Session Basel (2009); all releases from The Zealot Gene (2022) onwards
	Scott Hammond	2017–present	drums; percussion	all releases from The Zealot Gene (2022) onwards
	Jack Clark	2024–present	lead guitar; keyboards; bass and rhythm guitar (previously as a touring member since 2022)	Curious Ruminant (2025)

=== Former ===
Image	Name	Years active	Instruments	Release contributions
	Clive Bunker	1967–1971	drums; percussion	all Jethro Tull releases from This Was (1968) to Aqualung (1971); Living with the Past (2002) – guest appearance on one track; Nothing Is Easy: Live at the Isle of Wight 1970 (2004); Live at Carnegie Hall 1970 (2015)
	Glenn Cornick	1967–1970 (died 2014)	bass	This Was (1968); Stand Up (1969); Benefit (1970); Living with the Past (2002) – guest appearance on one track; Nothing Is Easy: Live at the Isle of Wight 1970 (2004); Live at Carnegie Hall 1970 (2015)
	Mick Abrahams	1967–1968 (died 2025)	lead guitar; backing and lead vocals	This Was (1968); Living with the Past (2002) – guest appearance on one track
	Martin Barre	1968–2011	lead guitar; mandolin; flute	all Jethro Tull releases from Stand Up (1969) to Live at Carnegie Hall 1970 (2015)
	John Evan	1970–1980	keyboards; synthesisers; piano; backing vocals	all Jethro Tull releases from Benefit (1970) to Stormwatch (1979); Nothing Is Easy: Live at the Isle of Wight 1970 (2004); Live at Madison Square Garden 1978 (2009); Live at Carnegie Hall 1970 (2015)
	Jeffrey Hammond	1970–1975	bass; vocals	all Jethro Tull releases from Aqualung (1971) to Minstrel in the Gallery (1975)
	Barriemore Barlow	1971–1980	drums; percussion	all Jethro Tull releases from Thick as a Brick (1972) to Stormwatch (1979); Live at Madison Square Garden 1978 (2009)
	John Glascock	1975–1979 (died 1979)	bass; backing vocals	all Jethro Tull releases from Too Old to Rock 'n' Roll: Too Young to Die! (1976) to Stormwatch (1979)
	Dee Palmer	1976–1980 (died 2026)	keyboards; synthesisers; saxophone; clarinet	all Jethro Tull releases from Songs from the Wood (1977) to Stormwatch (1979); Live at Madison Square Garden 1978 (2009)
	Dave Pegg	1979–1995	bass; mandolin; backing vocals; occasional guitar and bouzouki	all Jethro Tull releases from A (1980) to In Concert (1995); Living with the Past (2002)
	Mark Craney	1980–1981 (died 2005)	drums; occasional bass	A (1980); Slipstream (1981)
	Eddie Jobson	1980–1981 (credited as "special guest"); 1985 (substitute); 1989 (guest)	keyboards; electric violin; occasional mandolin	A (1980); Slipstream (1981)
	Gerry Conway	1981–1982 (died 2024)	drums; percussion	The Broadsword and the Beast (1982); Crest of a Knave (1987)
	Peter-John Vettese	1981–1984; 1986	keyboards; synthesisers; piano; backing vocals	The Broadsword and the Beast (1982); Under Wraps (1984); Rock Island (1989); Live at Hammersmith '84 (1990)
	Doane Perry	1984–2011	drums; percussion	all Jethro Tull releases from Crest of a Knave (1987) to Catfish Rising (1992), and from Roots to Branches (1995) to The Jethro Tull Christmas Album (2003); Aqualung Live (2005); Live at Montreux 2003 (2007); Live at AVO Session Basel (2009)
	Maartin Allcock	1988–1991 (died 2018)	keyboards; backing vocals	Rock Island (1989); In Concert (1991)
	Andrew Giddings	1991–2007	keyboards; piano; accordion; backing vocals	Catfish Rising (1992); all Jethro Tull releases from Roots to Branches (1995) to The Jethro Tull Christmas Album (2003); Aqualung Live (2005); Live at Montreux 2003 (2007); Curious Ruminant (2025)
	Jonathan Noyce	1995–2007	bass	J-Tull Dot Com (1999); Living with the Past (2002); The Jethro Tull Christmas Album (2003); Aqualung Live (2005); Live at Montreux 2003 (2007)
	Florian Opahle	2017–2019	lead guitar	The Zealot Gene (2022)
	Joe Parrish	2020–2024	lead guitar; vocals; mandolin	The Zealot Gene (2022) – one track only; RökFlöte (2023)

=== Touring ===
Image	Name	Years active	Instruments	Notes
	David O'List	1968	lead guitar	After leaving his previous band The Nice, O'List briefly joined Jethro Tull after the departure of Abrahams, rehearsing with the band for around a week.
	Tony Iommi	1968	lead guitar	Iommi joined following O'List's tenure, performing on The Rolling Stones Rock and Roll Circus, before returning to Black Sabbath; he played only on "Stormy Monday Blues" and "Love Story" (live at the BBC, 5 November 1968), 20 Years of Jethro Tull (1988).
	Tony Williams	1978	bass	Williams substituted for Glascock on a North American tour in 1978, while he was recovering from heart surgery.
	Phil Collins	1982	drums	Collins performed with the band at the Prince's Trust concert on 7 July 1982, following the departure of Conway.
	Paul Burgess	1982	drums	Burgess performed on Jethro Tull's North American tour in late 1982, following the departure of Conway.
	Don Airey	1987	keyboards	Following Vettese's departure the previous year, Airey performed keyboards on Jethro Tull's 1987 tour.
	Matt Pegg	1992–1994	bass	Pegg filled in for his father on several occasions between 1991 and 1994, during Fairport Convention activity.
	Dave Mattacks	1992	drums; percussion; keyboards	Fairport Convention drummer Dave Mattacks toured with Jethro Tull on a semi acoustic tour in 1992 on drums and keyboards, featuring on the resulting live album A Little Light Music.
	Mark Parnell	1994	drums	Parnell substituted for Perry on drums at several shows on the band's 1994 touring cycle.
	Lucia Micarelli	2005–2006	violin	Micarelli joined the Jethro Tull touring lineup on violin for shows from late 2005 through 2006.
	Anna Phoebe	2006–2007	violin	Phoebe and Calhoun replaced Micarelli in 2006, touring with Jethro Tull through 2007.
	Ann Marie Calhoun	2006–2007	violin	Phoebe and Calhoun replaced Micarelli in 2006, touring with Jethro Tull through 2007.

== Line-ups ==
Period	Members	Releases
December 1967 – December 1968	Ian Anderson – vocals, flute, guitar, keyboards; Mick Abrahams – lead guitar, vocals; Glenn Cornick – bass; Clive Bunker – drums, percussion	"Sunshine Day" (1968); This Was (1968); "Love Story" (1968); Living with the Past (2002) – one track only
December 1968	Ian Anderson – vocals, flute, guitar; David O'List – lead guitar (temporary); Glenn Cornick – bass; Clive Bunker – drums, percussion	none
December 1968	Ian Anderson – vocals, flute, guitar; Tony Iommi – lead guitar (temporary); Glenn Cornick – bass; Clive Bunker – drums, percussion	none
December 1968 – April 1970	Ian Anderson – vocals, flute, guitar, keyboards; Martin Barre – lead guitar, mandolin, flute; Glenn Cornick – bass; Clive Bunker – drums, percussion	"Living in the Past" (1969); Stand Up (1969); "Sweet Dream" (1969); "The Witch's Promise" (1970); Benefit (1970); Living in the Past (1972) – two unreleased tracks
April – December 1970	Ian Anderson – vocals, flute, guitar, keyboards; Martin Barre – lead guitar, mandolin, flute; John Evan – keyboards, piano, backing vocals; Glenn Cornick – bass; Clive Bunker – drums, percussion	Nothing Is Easy: Live at the Isle of Wight 1970 (2004); Live at Carnegie Hall 1970 (2015)
December 1970 – May 1971	Ian Anderson – vocals, flute, guitar, keyboards; Martin Barre – lead guitar, mandolin, flute; John Evan – keyboards, piano, backing vocals; Jeffrey Hammond – bass, backing vocals; Clive Bunker – drums, percussion	Aqualung (1971)
May 1971 – December 1975	Ian Anderson – vocals, flute, guitar, saxophone; Martin Barre – lead guitar, mandolin, flute; John Evan – keyboards, piano, backing vocals; Jeffrey Hammond – bass, backing vocals; Barriemore Barlow – drums, percussion	Life's a Long Song (1971); Thick as a Brick (1972); A Passion Play (1973); War Child (1974); Minstrel in the Gallery (1975); "Rainbow Blues" (1976)
December 1975 – September 1976	Ian Anderson – vocals, flute, guitar, harmonica; Martin Barre – lead guitar, mandolin, flute; John Evan – keyboards, piano, backing vocals; John Glascock – bass, backing vocals; Barriemore Barlow – drums, percussion	Too Old to Rock 'n' Roll: Too Young to Die! (1976)
September 1976 – summer 1979	Ian Anderson – vocals, flute, guitar, mandolin; Martin Barre – lead guitar, mandolin, flute; John Evan – keyboards, piano, backing vocals; Dee Palmer – keyboards, piano; John Glascock – bass, backing vocals; Barriemore Barlow – drums, percussion	Songs from the Wood (1977); "Glory Row" (1977); Heavy Horses (1978); Bursting Out (1978); Stormwatch (1979) – three tracks only; Live at Madison Square Garden 1978 (2009)
Summer 1979	Ian Anderson – vocals, flute, guitar, bass; Martin Barre – lead guitar, mandolin, flute; John Evan – keyboards, piano, backing vocals; Dee Palmer – keyboards, piano; Barriemore Barlow – drums, percussion	Stormwatch (1979) – remaining tracks
September 1979 – early 1980	Ian Anderson – vocals, flute, guitar, mandolin; Martin Barre – lead guitar, mandolin, flute; John Evan – keyboards, piano, backing vocals; Dee Palmer – keyboards, piano; Dave Pegg – bass, mandolin, backing vocals; Barriemore Barlow – drums, percussion	King Henry's Madrigal (1979) - B-side to single release of "Home" off of Stormwatch
July 1980 – February 1981	Ian Anderson – vocals, flute, guitar; Martin Barre – lead guitar, mandolin; Eddie Jobson – keyboards, violin; Dave Pegg – bass, mandolin, backing vocals; Mark Craney – drums	A (1980); Slipstream (1981)
Early – late 1981	Ian Anderson – vocals, flute, guitar, keyboards; Martin Barre – lead guitar, mandolin; Dave Pegg – bass, mandolin, backing vocals; Gerry Conway – drums, percussion	Nightcap (1993) – four tracks
Late 1981 – early 1982	Ian Anderson – vocals, flute, guitar, keyboards; Martin Barre – lead guitar, mandolin; Peter-John Vettese – keyboards, backing vocals; Dave Pegg – bass, mandolin, backing vocals; Gerry Conway – drums, percussion	The Broadsword and the Beast (1982)
July 1982	Ian Anderson – vocals, flute, guitar; Martin Barre – lead guitar, mandolin; Peter-John Vettese – keyboards, backing vocals; Dave Pegg – bass, mandolin, backing vocals; Phil Collins – drums (temporary)	none
September – October 1982	Ian Anderson – vocals, flute, guitar; Martin Barre – lead guitar, mandolin; Peter-John Vettese – keyboards, backing vocals; Dave Pegg – bass, mandolin, backing vocals; Paul Burgess – drums (temporary)	none
Late 1982 – summer 1984	Ian Anderson – vocals, flute, guitar, keyboards; Martin Barre – lead guitar, mandolin; Peter-John Vettese – keyboards, backing vocals; Dave Pegg – bass, mandolin, backing vocals	Under Wraps (1984)
Summer 1984 – summer 1986	Ian Anderson – vocals, flute, guitar, keyboards; Martin Barre – lead guitar, mandolin; Peter-John Vettese – keyboards, backing vocals; Dave Pegg – bass, mandolin, backing vocals; Doane Perry – drums, percussion	Live at Hammersmith '84 (1990)
Summer 1986 – summer 1987	Ian Anderson – vocals, flute, guitar, keyboards; Martin Barre – lead guitar, mandolin; Dave Pegg – bass, mandolin, backing vocals; Doane Perry – drums, percussion	Crest of a Knave (1987) (Perry shares drum duties with Conway)
October – December 1987	Ian Anderson – vocals, flute, guitar, mandolin; Martin Barre – lead guitar, mandolin; Don Airey – keyboards (temporary); Dave Pegg – bass, mandolin, backing vocals; Doane Perry – drums, percussion	none
January 1988 – December 1991	Ian Anderson – vocals, flute, guitar, mandolin; Martin Barre – lead guitar, mandolin; Maartin Allcock – keyboards; Dave Pegg – bass, mandolin, backing vocals; Doane Perry – drums, percussion	Rock Island (1989) (Allcock shares keyboard duties with Vettese and Anderson); In Concert (1991)
December 1991 – early 1995	Ian Anderson – vocals, flute, guitar, keyboards; Martin Barre – lead guitar, mandolin; Andrew Giddings – keyboards, backing vocals; Dave Pegg – bass, mandolin, backing vocals; Doane Perry – drums, percussion	Catfish Rising (1991); Roots to Branches (1995) – three tracks only; Living with the Past (2002) – three tracks only
1992 (semi-acoustic concert tour)	Ian Anderson – vocals, flute, guitar, mandolin; Martin Barre – lead guitar, mandolin; Dave Pegg – bass, mandolin, backing vocals; Dave Mattacks – drums, percussion, keyboards	A Little Light Music (1992)
Early – mid-1995	Ian Anderson – vocals, flute, guitar, mandolin; Martin Barre – lead guitar, mandolin; Andrew Giddings – keyboards, backing vocals; Steve Bailey – bass (session); Doane Perry – drums, percussion	Roots to Branches (1995) – remaining tracks
Summer 1995 – summer 2006	Ian Anderson – vocals, flute, guitar, mandolin; Martin Barre – lead guitar, mandolin; Andrew Giddings – keyboards, backing vocals; Jonathan Noyce – bass; Doane Perry – drums, percussion	J-Tull Dot Com (1999); Living with the Past (2002) – remaining tracks; The Jethro Tull Christmas Album (2003); Aqualung Live (2005); Live at Montreux 2003 (2007)
Early 2007 – late 2011	Ian Anderson – vocals, flute, guitar, mandolin; Martin Barre – lead guitar, mandolin; John O'Hara – keyboards, backing vocals; David Goodier – bass, double bass; Doane Perry – drums, percussion	The Best of Acoustic Jethro Tull (2007) – two new tracks; Live at AVO Session Basel (2009)
Band inactive 2011–2017
August 2017 – late 2019	Ian Anderson – vocals, flute, guitar, mandolin; Florian Opahle – lead guitar; John O'Hara – keyboards, backing vocals; David Goodier – bass, double bass; Scott Hammond – drums, percussion	The Zealot Gene (2022)
2020 – February 2024	Ian Anderson – vocals, flute, guitar, mandolin; Joe Parrish – lead guitar, vocals, mandolin; John O'Hara – keyboards, backing vocals; David Goodier – bass, double bass; Scott Hammond – drums, percussion	The Zealot Gene (2022) – one track only; RökFlöte (2023)
February 2024 – present	Ian Anderson – vocals, flute, guitar, mandolin; Jack Clark – lead guitar; John O'Hara – keyboards, backing vocals; David Goodier – bass, double bass; Scott Hammond – drums, percussion	Curious Ruminant (2025)

== Bibliography ==
- Larkin, Colin (2011), The Encyclopedia of Popular Music, London, England: Omnibus Press, ISBN 978-0857125958
- Rabey, Brian (2013), A Passion Play: The Story of Ian Anderson & Jethro Tull, London, England: Soundcheck Books, ISBN 978-0957144248
- Rees, David (1998), Minstrels in the Gallery: A History of Jethro Tull, London, England: Firefly Publishing, ISBN 978-0946719228
