= The Very Best Of (Jethro Tull album) =

Greatest hits album by Jethro Tull
- Released: May 14, 2001 (UK)
- Recorded: 1968–1995
- Genre: Progressive rock; progressive folk; hard rock
- Length: 78:00
- Label: Chrysalis
- Producer: Ian Anderson

Jethro Tull chronology
| J-Tull Dot Com (1999) | The Very Best Of (2001) | Living with the Past (2002) |

Professional ratings
Review scores
| Source | Rating |
|---|---|
| Allmusic | 3/5 stars |
| The Encyclopedia of Popular Music | 4/5 stars |

The Very Best Of (2001) is a greatest hits album by Jethro Tull. It includes some of the band's biggest hits from 1969 to the present day. Ian Anderson selected the tracks himself, approving edits necessary for timing purposes, e.g. "Heavy Horses".

== Track listing ==
All tracks are written by Ian Anderson, except where noted.

| No. | Title | Original Album | Length |
|---|---|---|---|
| 1. | "Living in the Past" | Non-album single, 1969 | 3:39 |
| 2. | "Aqualung" (Anderson, Jennie Anderson) | Aqualung, 1971 | 6:35 |
| 3. | "Sweet Dream" | Non-album single, 1969 | 4:02 |
| 4. | "The Whistler" | Songs from the Wood, 1977 | 3:28 |
| 5. | "Bungle in the Jungle" | War Child, 1974 | 3:35 |
| 6. | "The Witch's Promise" | Non-album single, 1970 | 3:49 |
| 7. | "Locomotive Breath" | Aqualung | 4:24 |
| 8. | "Steel Monkey" | Crest of a Knave, 1987 | 3:36 |
| 9. | "Thick as a Brick (Edit #1)" (edit of the first 3 minutes of the song) | Thick as a Brick, 1972 | 3:00 |
| 10. | "Bourée" (Anderson, Johann Sebastian Bach; instrumental) | Stand Up, 1969 | 3:44 |
| 11. | "Too Old to Rock 'n' Roll: Too Young to Die" (single edit) | Too Old to Rock 'n' Roll: Too Young to Die!, 1976 | 3:54 |
| 12. | "Life Is a Long Song" | Life Is a Long Song, 1971 (EP) | 3:16 |
| 13. | "Songs from the Wood" | Songs from the Wood | 4:51 |
| 14. | "A New Day Yesterday" | Stand Up | 4:08 |
| 15. | "Heavy Horses" (edit) | Heavy Horses, 1978 | 3:19 |
| 16. | "Broadsword" | The Broadsword and the Beast, 1982 | 4:59 |
| 17. | "Roots to Branches (Note: Incorrectly listed as "Root to Branches" on the CD track list.)" | Roots to Branches, 1995 | 5:11 |
| 18. | "A Song for Jeffrey" | This Was, 1968 | 3:17 |
| 19. | "Minstrel in the Gallery" (single edit; Anderson, Martin Barre) | Minstrel in the Gallery, 1975 | 3:49 |
| 20. | "Cheerio" | The Broadsword and the Beast | 1:10 |

== Charts ==
| Chart (2001) | Peak position |
|---|---|
| German Albums (Offizielle Top 100) | 65 |
| Norwegian Albums (VG-lista) | 13 |
| Swiss Albums (Schweizer Hitparade) | 99 |

== Certifications ==
| Region | Certification | Certified units/sales |
|---|---|---|
| United Kingdom (BPI) | Gold | 100,000^{^} |
^{^} Shipments figures based on certification alone.
