= Through the Years (Jethro Tull album) =

Compilation album by Jethro Tull
- Released: 1998
- Genre: Progressive rock; hard rock
- Length: 63:38
- Label: Disky Communications

Jethro Tull chronology
In Concert (1995)	Through the Years (1998)	J-Tull Dot Com (1999)

Professional ratings
Review scores
Source	Rating
AllMusic	3/5 stars
The Encyclopedia of Popular Music	3/5 stars

Through the Years is a compilation album by the progressive rock band Jethro Tull. It is something of a retrospective; with songs from many different periods in the band's history. It is not a greatest hits album; as it has many songs not on such albums (Such as "Quizz Kid", "Still Loving You Tonight" and "Beastie".) It has material spanning all over the band's existence, from their first album to Roots to Branches. The liner notes contain a short history of Jethro Tull, starting humorously with the question: "Didn't Jethro Tull die of a drug overdose?"

== Track listing ==
1. "Living in the Past" (live) (from A Little Light Music, 1992) – 5:03
2. "Wind Up" (from Aqualung, 1971) – 6:04
3. "Warchild" (from War Child, 1974) – 4:33
4. "Dharma for One" (instrumental) (from This Was, 1968) – 4:11
5. "Acres Wild" (from Heavy Horses, 1978) – 3:22
6. "Budapest" (from Crest of a Knave, 1987) – 10:00
7. "The Whistler" (from Songs from the Wood, 1977) – 3:30
8. "We Used to Know" (from Stand Up, 1969) – 3:55
9. "Beastie" (from The Broadsword and the Beast, 1982) – 3:57
10. "Locomotive Breath (live)" (from Bursting Out, 1978) – 5:36
11. "Rare and Precious Chain" (from Roots to Branches, 1995) – 3:34
12. "Quizz Kid" (from Too Old to Rock 'n' Roll: Too Young to Die!, 1976) – 5:08
13. "Still Loving You Tonight" (from Catfish Rising, 1991) – 4:30

The track "Living in the Past" is not listed as live, but is in fact taken from the live album A Little Light Music (1992).
