= Around the World Live (Jethro Tull album) =

Video by Jethro Tull
- Released: 2013
- Recorded: 1970, 1976, 1980, 1982, 1986, 1996, 1999, 2005
- Genre: Rock
- Length: 355:00
- Label: Eagle

Jethro Tull chronology
Live at AVO Session Basel (2009)	Around the World Live (2013)	Live at Carnegie Hall 1970 (Jethro Tull) (2015)

Around the World Live is a video by English rock band Jethro Tull, released in 2013. It comprises in-concert footage recorded by the band from 1970 to 2005. It was given a rating of three stars by Record Collector.

== DVD track listing ==
=== DVD 1 ===
Live at the Isle of Wight Festival 1970

1. My Sunday Feeling
2. My God

Live in Tampa, FL 1976

1. Quartet (Intro)
2. Thick As A Brick
3. Wond'ring Aloud
4. Crazed Institution
5. Barre/Drum Solo
6. To Cry You A Song/A New Day Yesterday/Bourée/God Rest Ye Merry Gentlemen
7. Living in the Past/Thick As A Brick
8. A New Day Yesterday (Reprise)
9. Too Old To Rock 'n' Roll, Too Young To Die
10. Minstrel in the Gallery
11. Excerpt from Beethoven's Symphony No. 9 (Molto Vivace)

Live in Munich 1980

1. Aqualung
2. Dark Ages
3. Home
4. Orion
5. Too Old To Rock 'n' Roll, Too Young To Die
6. Cross-Eyed Mary
7. Minstrel in the Gallery
8. Locomotive Breath
9. Dambusters March

=== DVD 2 ===
Live in Dortmund 1982

1. Pussy Willow
2. Heavy Horses (Live at the Loreley, Germany 1986)
3. Black Sunday (Live in Santiago, Chile 1996)
4. Roots To Branches
5. Rare And Precious
6. Thick As A Brick
7. In The Grip Of Stronger Stuff
8. Dangerous Veils
9. Aqualung/Aquadiddly
10. Nothing Is Easy
11. Bourée
12. In The Moneylenders' Temple
13. My God
14. Locomotive Breath

=== DVD 3 ===
Live in Hilversum, Holland 1999

1. Some Day The Sun Won't Shine For You
2. Thick As A Brick
3. Locomotive Breath
4. The Secret Language Of Birds
5. Dot Com
6. Fat Man
7. Bourée
8. In The Grip Of Stronger Stuff
9. Interview with Ian Anderson, 1999
10. Cross-Eyed Mary
11. Hunt By Numbers
12. My Sunday Feeling (Live at Montreux 2003)
13. Some Day The Sun Won't Shine For You
14. Life Is A Long Song
15. Living in the Past

=== DVD 4 ===
Live in Lugano, Switzerland 2005

1. Aqualung (Intro)
2. For A Thousand Mothers
3. Nothing Is Easy
4. Jack in the Green
5. Serenade to a Cuckoo
6. Beggar's Farm
7. Boris Dancing
8. Weathercock
9. We Five Kings
10. Up To Me
11. Bourée
12. Mother Goose
13. Empty Café
14. Farm on the Freeway
15. Hymn 43
16. A New Day Yesterday
17. Budapest
18. Aqualung
19. Locomotive Breath
20. Protect And Survive
21. Cheerio

== Personnel ==
- Ian Anderson – vocals, flute, acoustic guitar
- Martin Barre – electric guitar
- John Evan – keyboards
- David Palmer – keyboards, saxophone
- Peter Vettese – keyboards
- Andrew Giddings – keyboards
- Glenn Cornick – bass guitar
- John Glascock – bass guitar
- Dave Pegg – bass guitar
- Jonathan Noyce – bass guitar
- Clive Bunker – drums
- Barriemore Barlow – drums
- Gerry Conway – drums
- Doane Perry – drums

== See also ==
- Living with the Past
- Live at Madison Square Garden 1978
