= Jack in the Green: Live in Germany 1970–1993 =

Video by Jethro Tull
- Released: 20 May 2008
- Recorded: 1970, 1971, 1982, 1986, 1993
- Genre: Rock
- Length: 114:00
- Label: Eagle

Jethro Tull chronology
Live at Montreux 2003 (2007)	Jack in the Green: Live in Germany 1970–1993 (2008)	Classic Artists : Jethro Tull - Their Fully Authorized Story (2008)

Professional ratings
Review scores
Source	Rating
AllMusic	3.5/5 stars

Jack in the Green: Live in Germany 1970–1993 is a video by English rock band Jethro Tull, released in 2008. It comprises in-concert footage recorded in Germany by the band from 1970 to 1993.

== DVD track listing ==
Rockpop in Concert - 1982

1. Fallen on Hard Times (Ian Anderson, Dave Pegg)
2. Pussy Willow (Anderson)
3. Heavy Horses (Anderson, Pegg)
4. Jack in the Green (Anderson)
5. Keyboard solo (Instrumental) (John Evan, Pegg)
6. Sweet Dream (Anderson)
7. Aqualung (Anderson)
8. Locomotive Breath (Anderson)
9. Cheerio (Anderson)

Rocksummer - 1986

1. Hunting Girl (Anderson)

Out in the Green - 1986

1. Thick as a Brick (Anderson)
2. Black Sunday (Anderson)
3. Improvisation II (Barre, Anderson)
4. Too Old to Rock and Roll, Too Young to Die (Anderson)

Live - 1993

1. My Sunday Feeling (Anderson)
2. So Much Trouble (Anderson)

Beat-Club 1970 – 1971

1. With You There to Help Me (Anderson)
2. Nothing is Easy (Anderson)

== Personnel ==
- Ian Anderson – vocals, flute, guitar (1967–2014)
- Martin Barre – electric guitar (1968–2014)
- John Evan – keyboards (1970–1980)
- Peter Vettese – keyboards, vocoder (1982–1986; studio – 1989)
- Andrew Giddings – keyboards (1991–2007)
- Glenn Cornick – bass guitar (1967–1970; died 2014)
- Dave Pegg – bass guitar (1979–1995)
- Clive Bunker – drums (1967–1971)
- Gerry Conway – drums (1982; studio – 1987–1988)
- Doane Perry – drums (2007–2012)

== See also ==
- Living with the Past
- Live at Madison Square Garden 1978
