= Live at Montreux 2003 (Jethro Tull album) =

2007 video and live album

Video by Jethro Tull
- Released: 20 August 2007
- Recorded: 4 July 2003
- Genre: Progressive rock, Folk rock
- Length: 119:00
- Label: Eagle
- Director: Luca De Luigi
- Producer: Claude Nobs; Terry Shand; Geoff Kempin

Jethro Tull chronology
The Best of Acoustic Jethro Tull (2007)	Live at Montreux 2003 (2007)	Jack in the Green: Live in Germany 1970–1993 (2008)

CD cover

Professional ratings
Review scores
Source	Rating
All About Jazz (DVD)	favorable
AllMusic (CD)	3.5/5 stars
The Encyclopedia of Popular Music	3/5 stars

Live at Montreux 2003 is a video and a live album by British rock band Jethro Tull, released in 2007. It was recorded at the Montreux Jazz Festival where the band played in 2003.

== Track listing ==
=== CD 1 ===
1. "Some Day the Sun Won't Shine for You"
2. "Life Is a Long Song"
3. "Bourée" (Instrumental) (Version de Noël)
4. "With You There to Help Me"
5. "Pavane" (Instrumental)
6. "Empty Café" (Instrumental)
7. "Hunting Girl"
8. "Eurology" (Instrumental)
9. "Dot Com"
10. "God Rest Ye Merry Gentlemen"
11. "Fat Man"

=== CD 2 ===
1. "Living in the Past"
2. "Nothing Is Easy"
3. "Beside Myself"
4. "My God"
5. "Budapest"
6. "New Jig" (Instrumental)
7. "Aqualung" (includes "Band introduction")
8. (Encore) "Locomotive Breath" (includes "Protect and Survive" and "Cheerio")

== DVD track listing ==
1. "Some Day the Sun Won't Shine for You" (Anderson)
2. "Life Is a Long Song" (Anderson)
3. "Bourée" (Instrumental) (Anderson) (Version de Noël)
4. "With You There to Help Me"
5. "Pavane" (Instrumental) (Anderson)
6. "Empty Café" (Instrumental) (Barre, Noyce)
7. "Hunting Girl" (Anderson)
8. "Eurology" (Instrumental) (Giddings)
9. "Dot Com" (Anderson)
10. "God Rest Ye Merry Gentlemen" (Instrumental) (Anderson)
11. "Fat Man" (Anderson)
12. "Living in the Past" (Anderson)
13. "Nothing Is Easy" (Anderson)
14. "Beside Myself" (Anderson)
15. "My God" (Anderson)
16. "Budapest" (Anderson)
17. "New Jig" (Instrumental) (Giddings, Anderson)
18. "Aqualung" (includes "Band introduction")
19. (Encore) "Locomotive Breath" (includes "Protect and Survive")
20. "Cheerio" (Instrumental) (Anderson)

== Personnel ==
- Ian Anderson – vocals, flute, acoustic guitar, harmonica, mandolin
- Martin Barre – electric and acoustic guitar, flute
- Andrew Giddings – keyboard, accordion
- Doane Perry – drums, percussion
- Jonathan Noyce – bass guitar, percussion

== Charts ==
Chart (2007)	Peak position
German Albums (Offizielle Top 100)	38
Italian Albums (FIMI)	87

== See also ==
- Living with the Past
- Live at Madison Square Garden 1978
- Bursting Out
