= Live at AVO Session Basel =

Video by Jethro Tull
- Released: 2009
- Recorded: 2008
- Genre: Rock
- Label: Edel

Jethro Tull chronology
Live at Madison Square Garden 1978 (2009)	Live at AVO Session Basel (2009)	Around the World Live (Jethro Tull) (2013)

Live at AVO Session Basel is a video by English rock band Jethro Tull, and was released in 2009. It shows footage of the concert released in Basel by the band in 2008, at the Avo Session Basel indoor music festival.

== Track listing ==
1. My Sunday Feeling
2. Living in the Past
3. Serenade to a Cuckoo (Instrumental)
4. So Much Trouble
5. Nursie
6. Rocks on the Road
7. A New Day Yesterday
8. Too Old to Rock 'n' Roll: Too Young to Die
9. Bourée (Instrumental)
10. Nothing Is Easy
11. Dharma for One (Instrumental) (Drum solo)
12. Heavy Horses
13. Thick as a Brick (excerpt)
14. Aqualung
15. Locomotive Breath

== Personnel ==
- Ian Anderson– vocals, flute, guitar
- Martin Barre– electric guitar
- John O'Hara– keyboard
- David Goodier– bass guitar
- Doane Perry– drums

== See also ==
- Living with the Past
