= J-Tull Dot Com =

1999 studio album by Jethro Tull

Studio album by Jethro Tull
- Released: 23 August 1999
- Genres: Progressive rock; hard rock; folk rock; world
- Length: 54:20
- Label: Papillon/Varèse Sarabande
- Producer: Ian Anderson

Jethro Tull chronology
Through the Years (1998)	J-Tull Dot Com (1999)	The Very Best Of (2001)

Singles from J-Tull Dot Com
- 1. "Bends Like a Willow" Released: 1999 (UK)

Professional ratings
Review scores
Source	Rating
AllMusic	2/5 stars
The Encyclopedia of Popular Music	3/5 stars
Jam!	mixed
Mojo	favourable

J-Tull Dot Com is the twentieth studio album by the British band Jethro Tull, released in 1999 on Papillon, the Chrysalis Group's late 1990s heritage record label. It was released four years after their 1995 album Roots to Branches and continues in the same vein, marrying hard rock with Eastern music influences. It is the first album to feature Jonathan Noyce on bass, who would remain with the band until 2007 in Jethro Tull's longest ever unchanged line-up. This was the last Jethro Tull album to feature all original, new material for 23 years (until the release of The Zealot Gene in 2022), although the band did release a Christmas album in 2003, which contained a mixture of new material, re-recordings of Tull's own suitably themed material and arrangements of traditional Christmas music.

== Track listing ==
All tracks are written by Ian Anderson, except where noted.

No.	Title	Writer(s)	Length
1.	"Spiral"		3:50
2.	"Dot Com"		4:25
3.	"AWOL"		5:19
4.	"Nothing @ All" (Instrumental)	Andrew Giddings	0:56
5.	"Wicked Windows"		4:40
6.	"Hunt by Numbers"		4:00
7.	"Hot Mango Flush"	Martin Barre, Anderson	3:49
8.	"El Niño"		4:40
9.	"Black Mamba"		5:00
10.	"Mango Surprise"		1:14
11.	"Bends Like a Willow"		4:53
12.	"Far Alaska"		4:06
13.	"The Dog-Ear Years"		3:34
14.	"A Gift of Roses"		3:54

On some versions of the CD there is a period of silence after "A Gift of Roses" followed by the title track of Anderson's (at the time unreleased) solo album The Secret Language of Birds. The track is preceded by a brief spoken word introduction by Anderson. This extends the length of "A Gift of Roses" to 9:16.

== Personnel ==
- Ian Anderson – vocals, flute, acoustic guitar, bouzouki
- Martin Barre – acoustic guitar, electric guitar
- Jonathan Noyce – bass guitar
- Andrew Giddings – piano, keyboards, Hammond organ, accordion
- Doane Perry – drums, percussion

Additional personnel

- Najma Akhtar – backing vocals (on "Dot Com")

== Charts ==
Chart performance for J-Tull Dot Com
Chart (1999)	Peak position
German Albums (Offizielle Top 100)	15
Italian Albums (Musica e Dischi)	33
Scottish Albums (Official Charts)	62
Swiss Albums (Schweizer Hitparade)	50
UK Albums (Official Charts)	44
UK Independent Albums (Official Charts)	5
US Billboard 200	161

Chart performance for J-Tull Dot Com: Another Cast of the Net
Chart (2026)	Peak position
Austrian Albums (Ö3 Austria)	29
Belgian Albums (Ultratop Flanders)	97
Belgian Albums (Ultratop Wallonia)	154
Finnish Physical Albums (Suomen virallinen lista)	5
French Physical Albums (SNEP)	56
French Rock & Metal Albums (SNEP)	23
German Albums (Offizielle Top 100)	8
German Rock & Metal Albums (Offizielle Top 100)	4
Hungarian Physical Albums (MAHASZ)	15
Norwegian Physical Albums (IFPI Norge)	2
Norwegian Rock Albums (IFPI Norge)	16
Swedish Physical Albums (Sverigetopplistan)	9
Swiss Albums (Schweizer Hitparade)	21

== See also ==
- www.pitchshifter.com, a 1998 album also named after the band's domain name
