= Nightcap: The Unreleased Masters 1973–1991 =

Compilation album of outtakes by Jethro Tull
- Released: 22 November 1993 (UK); 11 January 2000 (US)
- Recorded: 1972 – 1991 at various locations
- Genres: Progressive rock; hard rock
- Length: 120:39
- Label: Chrysalis
- Producer: Ian Anderson

Jethro Tull chronology
The Best of Jethro Tull - The Anniversary Collection (1993)	Nightcap: The Unreleased Masters 1973–1991 (1993)	Roots to Branches (1995)

Professional ratings
Review scores
Source	Rating
Allmusic	2.5/5 stars

Nightcap: The Unreleased Masters 1973–1991 is a double compilation album by British rock band Jethro Tull, released on 22 November 1993. It consists of some of the band's previously unreleased material as well as some new material.

The first disc contains material recorded in August 1972, much of which was re-recorded and re-arranged for the band's sixth album, A Passion Play (the lyrics of "Critique Oblique" and "Scenario" actually refer to the "passion play" in question). The songs "Scenario", "Audition" and "No Rehearsal" initially appeared on the 20 Years of Jethro Tull box set as a single track entitled "The Chateau d'Isaster Tapes". This humorous title is also used on Nightcap as the title of the entire first disc. The material on the first disc was mixed and arranged as the aforementioned three tracks were on the 20 Years box set with numerous flute overdubs by Ian Anderson, but excludes the songs "Big Top" and "Sailor".

All "Chateau d'Isaster" material apart from "The Story of the Hare Who Lost His Spectacles", which had been cut into the album A Passion Play in 1973, was included as part of the 2014 re-release of A Passion Play, remixed by Steven Wilson and without any overdubs. For this release, several titles were corrected to the titles given on the original tape boxes (see below) and the order was also restored to the originally planned three LP sides, which are basically reversed on Nightcap.

In 2024, the most complete version of the original sessions so far was released as a double vinyl album and on download and streaming services, simply titled The Chateau D'Herouville Sessions 1972. This includes the same mixes as on the A Passion Play book set but with a stripped-down version of "The Story of the Hare Who Lost His Spectacles" inserted in its original position. The fourth side of the album was filled with the 20 Years mix and the 1973/1974 mixes of "Only Solitaire", "The Story of the Hare Who Lost His Spectacles" and "Skating Away On The Thin Ice of the New Day".

The second disc of Nightcap contains unreleased material recorded between 1974 and 1991, in particular extra songs from the sessions for The Broadsword and the Beast. Many of the songs on this disc also appear as bonus tracks on CD reissues of Jethro Tull studio albums. Seven tracks had been released earlier in 1993 on the CD and 7" formats of the "Living in the Past" rerelease.

The album was produced in limited quantities with proceeds going to charity.

== Track listing ==
=== Disc one ===
My Round: Chateau d'Isaster Tapes

1. "First Post" – 1:54
2. "Animelée" – 1:41 Both first tracks form "Animelée (First Dance)" on the 2014 remix
3. "Tiger Toon" – 1:36 Actually "Animelée (Second Dance)"
4. "Look at the Animals" – 5:09 Actually "Law of the Bungle (Pt. I)"
5. "Law of the Bungle" – 2:32 Actually "Tiger Toon"
6. "Law of the Bungle Part II" – 5:26
7. "Left Right" – 5:01
8. "Solitaire" – 1:25
9. "Critique Oblique" – 9:03
10. "Post Last" – 5:35 "Critique Oblique (Pt. II)" on the 2014 remix
11. "Scenario" – 3:26
12. "Audition" – 2:34
13. "No Rehearsal" – 5:12

=== Disc two ===
Your Round: Unreleased and Rare Tracks
No.	Title	Other release(s)	Length
1.	"Paradise Steakhouse"	War Child 2002 remaster War Child: The 40th Anniversary Theatre Edition	4:01
2.	"Sealion II"	War Child 2002 remaster War Child: The 40th Anniversary Theatre Edition	3:21
3.	"Piece of Cake"	"Living in the Past" CD2, 1993	3:40
4.	"Quartet"	War Child 2002 remaster War Child: The 40th Anniversary Theatre Edition	2:45
5.	"Silver River Turning"	"Living in the Past" CD1, 1993	4:52
6.	"Crew Nights"	Broadsword and the Beast: The 40th Anniversary Monster Edition	4:33
7.	"The Curse"	Broadsword and the Beast: The 40th Anniversary Monster Edition	3:39
8.	"Rosa on the Factory Floor"	"Living in the Past" CD1, 1993	4:38
9.	"A Small Cigar"	Too Old to Rock 'n' Roll: Too Young to Die! 2002 remaster Too Old to Rock 'n' Roll: Too Young to Die! - The TV Special Edition	3:39
10.	"Man of Principle"	"Living in the Past" CD2, 1993	3:57
11.	"Commons Brawl"	Broadsword and the Beast: The 40th Anniversary Monster Edition	3:24
12.	"No Step"	Broadsword and the Beast: The 40th Anniversary Monster Edition	3:38
13.	"Drive on the Young Side of Life"	Broadsword and the Beast: The 40th Anniversary Monster Edition	4:13
14.	"I Don't Want to Be Me"	"Living in the Past" CD1, 1993	3:29
15.	"Broadford Bazaar"	Heavy Horses 2003 remaster Stormwatch: The 40th Anniversary Force 10 Edition	3:38
16.	"Lights Out"	Broadsword and the Beast: The 40th Anniversary Monster Edition	5:16
17.	"Truck Stop Runner"	"Living in the Past" CD2, 1993	3:47
18.	"Hard Liner"	"Living in the Past" 7", 1993	3:47

== Recording locations and information ==
- Disc one:
  - All tracks recorded August 1972 at Château d'Hérouville, Hérouville, France.
    - Ian Anderson - vocals, flute, acoustic guitar, mandolin, tin whistle, fife
    - Martin Barre - electric guitar, spoken word
    - Jeffrey Hammond-Hammond - backing vocals, bass guitar
    - John Evan - piano, synthesizer, Hammond organ, celeste
    - Barriemore Barlow - drums, percussion
- Disc two:
  - Ian Anderson - vocals, flute, acoustic guitar, mandolin, tin whistle, fife, keyboards (on "No Step", "Lights Out, Hard Liner")
  - Tracks 1, 2 and 4 recorded 1974 at Morgan Studios, Fulham London
    - Martin Barre - electric guitar
    - Barriemore Barlow - drums, percussion
    - John Evan - Hammond organ, synthesizer, piano, accordion (on "Quartet")
    - Jeffrey Hammond-Hammond - acoustic string bass (on "Quartet"), vocals on ("Sealion II")
    - Dee Palmer - keyboards, orchestra conductor (on track 4)
  - Track 9 recorded 1975 at Maison Rouge Mobile Studio
    - Dee Palmer - keyboards, orchestra conductor
  - Track 15 recorded 1978 at Maison Rouge Mobile Studio, Fulham, London
  - Tracks 6, 7, 11 – 13 and 16 recorded 1981 at Maison Rouge Studios, Fulham, London
    - Martin Barre - electric guitar
    - Dave Pegg - backing vocals, bass guitar, mandolin
    - Gerry Conway - drums, percussion
    - Peter-John Vettese - piano, synthesizer (on tracks 6 and 13)
  - Track 10 recorded 1988 at Ian Anderson's home studio
    - Martin Barre - electric guitar
    - Dave Pegg - backing vocals, bass guitar
    - Gerry Conway - drums, percussion
  - Track 18 recorded 1989 at Ian Anderson's home studio
    - Martin Barre - electric guitar
    - Dave Pegg - backing vocals, bass guitar
  - Tracks 3, 5, 8 and 14 recorded 1990 at Ian Anderson's home studio
    - Martin Barre - electric guitar
    - Dave Pegg - bass guitar
    - Doane Perry - drums, percussion
    - John Bundrick - piano, Hammond organ (on tracks 3, 5 and 8)
  - Track 17 recorded 1991 at Ian Anderson's home studio and Woodworm Studios.
    - Martin Barre - electric guitar
    - Matthew Pegg - bass guitar
    - Scott Hunter - drums, percussion (Doane Perry is mistakenly credited on this track in the CD booklet?)

== Charts ==
Chart (1993)	Peak position
Australian Albums (ARIA)	131
