= Heavy horse =

Heavy horse may refer to:

- Draft horse, the largest-sized horse breeds
- Heavy cavalry, a level of armament of mounted troops
- Heavy Horses, an album by Jethro Tull
- The Heavy Horses, a Canadian country/roots band
