= Heavy Horses (song) =

Song by Jethro Tull

from the album Heavy Horses
- Released: 10 April 1978 (US); 21 April 1978 (UK)
- Recorded: May 1977–January 1978
- Studio: Maison Rouge Studio, Fulham, London
- Genre: Progressive rock; folk
- Length: 8:58
- Label: Chrysalis
- Songwriter: Ian Anderson
- Producer: Ian Anderson

"Heavy Horses" is a song written by Ian Anderson and performed by his band Jethro Tull. The song was released on the 1978 album of the same name. Written as a tribute to horses, the song features folk rock elements that rebelled against the musical trends of the period.

Released as an album track, "Heavy Horses" has since become a live staple for the band. It has since appeared on compilation albums and has generally seen positive reception from critics.

== Background ==
"Heavy Horses" was written by Ian Anderson as an ode to horses, an animal he claimed to have a soft spot for despite disliking riding them. He explained,

I suppose it's almost an equestrian "Aqualung" in a way. Once powerful and majestic creatures find themselves on the scrap heap, forgotten by society and replaced by machines. I'm not particularly obsessed by the animals, and it's not intended as a heartfelt campaign to bring them back into service, but I do have soft spot for horses.

"Heavy Horses" also represented an attempt by Anderson to go against the musical trends of the time, including punk and synth-pop. He discussed this further in an interview, saying, "On this occasion I was sticking to my feelings about the changing world. The music was very much pastoral and British. It must have seemed like deeply unfashionable folk rock at the time, coming as it did towards the end of the punk era, and just before the next big thing happened, which was synth pop."

The song's orchestral mid-section was co-written with Martin Barre at Anderson's request. This section also features a solo by Barre. Additionally, Curved Air's Darryl Way performs a violin solo on the track.

== Release and reception ==
"Heavy Horses" was released on the Heavy Horses album in April 1978 as the album's eighth track. The song was not released as a single. The track has since appeared on compilation albums such as The Best of Jethro Tull – The Anniversary Collection and The Very Best Of, with the latter album featuring a 3:19 edited version due to the album length.

"Heavy Horses" has since seen mixed-to-positive reception from critics. It was ranked the seventh best Jethro Tull song by Rock - Das Gesamtwerk der größten Rock-Acts im Check. David Bowling of the Seattle Post-Intelligencer named the song the second best track on the album, stating, "Barre's guitar and Glascock's bass performances provide a nice foundation for Anderson's poetry". AllMusic writer Bruce Eder praised Way's violin solo but claimed that the song "doesn't really take off until Way's instrument comes in on the break". Melody Maker praised the song's second half and orchestral arrangement, but criticized the lyrics for being "insignificant". Ian Anderson has named the song one of his top ten Jethro Tull songs.

== Live performances ==
"Heavy Horses" has since become a live mainstay for the band and its members, appearing on live albums such as Live at Madison Square Garden 1978 and In Concert and on the concert video Slipstream. The song is one of the most recent songs to appear on both Ian Anderson's and the reunited Jethro Tull's setlists (Anderson joked at a concert, "Enough of that old stuff. We're going to play one of our more recent songs, from 1978"). These performances feature accompanying video clips of singer Unnur Birna Björnsdóttir that were filmed for the 2015 show "Jethro Tull: The Rock Opera". The song has also been performed live by Barre in solo shows.
