= Songs from the Wood (song) =

Single by Jethro Tull

from the album Songs from the Wood
- B-side: "Jack-in-the-Green" (NZ)
- Released: 19 May 1977
- Recorded: 1976
- Genre: Folk rock; progressive rock
- Length: 4:52
- Label: Chrysalis
- Songwriter: Ian Anderson
- Producer: Ian Anderson

Jethro Tull singles chronology
"The Whistler" (1977)	"Songs from the Wood" (1977)	"Moths" (1978)

"Songs from the Wood" is the title track off of English rock band Jethro Tull's album Songs from the Wood. Written by frontman Ian Anderson, it features a folk-rock style that characterizes the Songs from the Wood album.

Inspired by English folk tradition, the song was named by Ian Anderson as one of his top Jethro Tull songs. The song has since received critical acclaim and was released as a single in New Zealand in 1977.

== Background ==
"Songs from the Wood" was inspired by a book of English folk stories Ian Anderson had been given. He explained, "I wrote 'Songs From the Wood' based on elements of folklore and fantasy tales and traditions of the British rural environment. Our PR guy, Jo Lustig, had given me a book about English folklore as a Christmas present, and I thumbed through it and found lots of little interesting ideas and characters and stories and things that I decided to evolve into a series of songs."

The song starts off with a cappella vocals before the flute and acoustic guitars make their appearance. Afterward, the rest of the band comes in. Anderson promises in the lyrics, "Songs from the wood make you feel much better." Anderson later reflected, "[The song] is quite a nice one, because it has a lot of carefully contrived harmonies which I sang myself in the studio."

When asked about the song in 2015, Anderson said, "This, the title song of our 1977 album, was unashamedly twee. It’s decorative folk rock. It openly extols the virtues of the countryside, and the values you want to impart through this to other people. I suppose it is country rock, but in the British sense. It’s all delivered with a fair amount of hefty music. There are big guitar riffs and a lot of flute as well. And it does get a little angry, but with a purpose." He ranked the song as one of his top 10 Jethro Tull songs.

== Release ==
"Songs from the Wood" was released as the title track on Jethro Tull's 1977 album, Songs from the Wood. An edited form of the song was later released as a single in New Zealand, backed with "Jack in the Green". The single did not chart.

== Reception ==
The song was largely praised by music critics. AllMusic's Bruce Eder said that "the harmonizing on 'Songs From the Wood' fulfills the promise shown in some of the singing on Thick as a Brick." New Musical Express called it "a great opener" and praised Anderson's singing.

"Songs from the Wood" was ranked the third best Jethro Tull song by Rock - Das Gesamtwerk der größten Rock-Acts im Check. Ultimate Classic Rock named the song Jethro Tull's fourth best, saying "The title track of Tull's tenth album threw everything but the burning campfire depicted on its cover at unsuspecting listeners, categorically dazzling them with its serpentine blend of rock, folk and classical music, not to mention those delightfully fey lyrics, delivered barbershop quartet-style by the band."
