= In Concert (Jethro Tull album) =

1995 live album by Jethro Tull

Live album by Jethro Tull
- Released: 24 April 1995
- Recorded: 8 October 1991
- Genre: Progressive rock
- Length: 53:14
- Label: Windsong International
- Producer: Pete Ritzema

Jethro Tull chronology
Roots to Branches (1995)	In Concert (1995)	Through the Years (1998)

Professional ratings
Review scores
Source	Rating
The Encyclopedia of Popular Music	3/5 stars

In Concert is a live album by Jethro Tull, recorded on 8 October 1991 at the Hammersmith Odeon in London and released in 1995.

== Track listing ==
1. "Minstrel in the Gallery/Cross-Eyed Mary" – 4:00
2. "This Is Not Love" – 4:00
3. "Rocks on the Road" – 6:30
4. "Heavy Horses" – 7:33
5. "Tall Thin Girl" – 3:28
6. "Still Loving You" – 4:40
7. "Thick as a Brick" – 7:48
8. "A New Day Yesterday" – 5:45
9. "Blues Jam" (Instrumental) – 3:00
10. "Jump Start" – 6:30

== Personnel ==
- Ian Anderson – vocals, flute, mandolin, acoustic guitar, harmonica
- Martin Barre – electric guitar, acoustic guitar
- Maartin Allcock – keyboards
- Dave Pegg – bass, backing vocals
- Doane Perry – drums
