= Roots to Branches =

1995 studio album by Jethro Tull

Studio album by Jethro Tull
- Released: 4 September 1995
- Recorded: December 1994 – June 1995
- Genres: Progressive rock; folk rock; hard rock; world
- Length: 60:00
- Label: Chrysalis
- Producer: Ian Anderson

Jethro Tull chronology
Nightcap (1993)	Roots to Branches (1995)	In Concert (1995)

Roots to Branches is the nineteenth studio album by the British band Jethro Tull released in September 1995. It carries characteristics of Tull's classic 1970s progressive rock and folk rock roots alongside jazz and Arabic and Indian influences. All songs were written by Ian Anderson and recorded at his home studio. It is the last Tull album to feature Dave Pegg on the bass, and the first to feature keyboardist Andrew Giddings as an official band member, although he had contributed to Catfish Rising (1991) on a session basis. As a result, the album features the five longest serving members to date in Jethro Tull's history. It was the final Tull album to be released through long-time label Chrysalis Records.

A remastered edition of the album was released in January 2007.

== Production and musical style ==
The album was derived in part from the visit Ian Anderson made to India. S.A. Allen, in a history of the band, describes the album as an "Indian Songs from the Wood."

Ian Anderson said of the album: "I see Roots To Branches as the 90s version of Stand Up, because it has a lot of the things that I feel represented the key elements of Jethro Tull: there's lots of flute, lots of riffy guitars and quite a broad palette of influences, from the blues and classical to the Eastern motifs that were apparent on Stand Up ". On the other hand, Anderson also added that "the only thing about it that lets me down is that I made it sound a little too Seventies. I deliberately made the album sound like it was in the context of a live performance, rather than have it sound too 'studio.' But looking back on it, I think it should have been a bit more varied".

== Critical reception ==
Professional ratings
Review scores
Source	Rating
AllMusic	2.5/5 stars
The Encyclopedia of Popular Music	2/5 stars

AllMusic made an unimpressed but positive review: "All of the songs here have more of a mood of urgency than some of Tull's then-recent albums, and a few even have memorable melodies [...] Anderson's flute occasionally takes flight, Martin Barre's guitar still wails on the breaks, and Doane Perry (drums), Dave Pegg (bass), and Steve Bailey (bass) make up a decent rhythm section. Not nearly as strong as Catfish Rising, but better than anything else since Heavy Horses".

== Track listing ==
All tracks are written by Ian Anderson.

No.	Title	Length
1.	"Roots to Branches"	5:11
2.	"Rare and Precious Chain"	3:35
3.	"Out of the Noise"	3:25
4.	"This Free Will"	4:05
5.	"Valley"	6:07
6.	"Dangerous Veils"	5:35
7.	"Beside Myself"	5:50
8.	"Wounded, Old and Treacherous"	7:50
9.	"At Last, Forever"	7:55
10.	"Stuck in the August Rain"	4:06
11.	"Another Harry's Bar"	6:21

== Personnel ==
Jethro Tull

- Ian Anderson – vocals, flute, acoustic guitar
- Martin Barre – electric guitar
- Dave Pegg – bass guitar (on tracks 3, 5 & 11)
- Andrew Giddings – keyboards
- Doane Perry – drums, percussion

Additional personnel

- Steve Bailey – bass guitar (on tracks 1, 6, 7, 8, 9 & 10)

== Release details ==
- 1995, UK, Chrysalis 8-35418-4, release date 31 August 1995, Cassette
- 1995, UK, Chrysalis CDCHR 6109, release date 4 September 1995, CD
- 1995, UK, Chrysalis CHR 6109, release date 4 September 1995, LP
- 1995, UK, Chrysalis TCCHR 6109, release date ? ? 1995, Cassette
- 1995, UK, Chrysalis 8-35418-2, release date ? ? 1995, CD
- 1995, US, Chrysalis F2 35418, release date 12 September 1995, CD
- 1995, US, Chrysalis CHR 6109, release date 12 September 1995, LP
- 1995, Australia, Chrysalis CDCHR 6109, release date 27 October 1995, CD

== Charts ==
Chart (1995)	Peak position
Australian Albums (ARIA)	141
Finnish Albums (Suomen virallinen lista)	31
German Albums (Offizielle Top 100)	55
Norwegian Albums (VG-lista)	27
Scottish Albums (Official Charts)	41
Swedish Albums (Sverigetopplistan)	21
Swiss Albums (Schweizer Hitparade)	25
UK Albums (Official Charts)	20
US Billboard 200	114

The album sold less than the predecessor, reaching only No. 114 on the US Billboard Charts, but achieving No. 20 on the UK Albums Chart.
