= Live at Madison Square Garden 1978 =

2009 concert video and album by Jethro Tull

Video by Jethro Tull
- Released: 2009
- Recorded: 9 October 1978
- Venue: Madison Square Garden, New York City
- Genre: Progressive rock; hard rock
- Length: Video 49:01 (DVD 93:09, CD 78:40)
- Label: Chrysalis/EMI

Jethro Tull chronology
Classic Artists : Jethro Tull - Their Fully Authorized Story (2008)	Live at Madison Square Garden 1978 (2009)	Live at AVO Session Basel (2009)

Professional ratings
Review scores
Source	Rating
AllMusic	2/5 stars
Classic Rock	7/10 stars
PopMatters	8/10 stars
Record Collector	4/5 stars

Live at Madison Square Garden 1978 is a concert video and an album by British rock band Jethro Tull, released in 2009. It was recorded on 9 October 1978 at Madison Square Garden in New York City.

Fifty minutes of the performance were broadcast live via satellite on the BBC's Old Grey Whistle Test TV show.

== Track listing ==
All songs written and composed by Ian Anderson, except where noted.

1. "Sweet Dream" – 6:52
2. "One Brown Mouse" – 3:24
3. "Heavy Horses" – 7:22
4. "Thick as a Brick" – 11:23
5. "No Lullaby (incl. Flute Solo)" – 9:00
6. "Songs from the Wood" – 4:53
7. "Quatrain" (instrumental) (Martin Barre) – 0:41
8. "Aqualung" (Ian Anderson, Jennie Anderson) – 8:04
9. "Locomotive Breath (incl. Dambusters March)" (Ian Anderson, Eric Coates) – 15:40
10. "Too Old to Rock 'n' Roll: Too Young to Die" – 4:17
11. "My God/Cross-Eyed Mary" – 6:59

== DVD track listing ==
Start of concert recording (audio only)

1. "Sweet Dream"
2. "One Brown Mouse"
3. "Heavy Horses"

Start of broadcast – video

4. "Opening"
5. "Thick as a Brick"
6. "No Lullaby (incl. Flute Solo)"
7. "Songs from the Wood"
8. "Band intro"
9. "Quatrain" (Instrumental)
10. "Aqualung"
11. "Locomotive Breath (incl. Dambusters March)"

End of broadcast – video (during "Locomotive Breath")

12. "Too Old to Rock 'N' Roll: Too Young to Die"
13. "My God/Cross-Eyed Mary"

Encore

14. "Locomotive Breath (incl. Dambusters March)"

== Personnel ==
Jethro Tull

- Ian Anderson – vocals, flute, guitar
- Martin Barre – electric guitar
- John Evan – piano, organ, synthesizers
- Barriemore Barlow – drums, glockenspiel
- David Palmer – portative pipe organ, synthesizers

Guest musician

- Tony Williams – bass guitar

== See also ==
- Living with the Past
