= The Whistler (song) =

Single by Jethro Tull

from the album Songs from the Wood
- B-side: "Strip Cartoon"
- Released: 4 February 1977
- Recorded: 1976
- Genre: Folk rock; progressive rock
- Length: 3:31
- Label: Chrysalis
- Songwriter(s): Ian Anderson
- Producer(s): Ian Anderson

Jethro Tull singles chronology
"Ring Out, Solstice Bells" (1977)	"The Whistler" (1977)	"Songs from the Wood" (1977)

"The Whistler" is a song by English rock band Jethro Tull from their 1977 album Songs from the Wood. Written by frontman Ian Anderson, it features a folk-rock style that characterizes the Songs from the Wood album.

Inspired by English folk tradition, the song was released as a single and reached number 59 in the US. The song has since received critical acclaim.

== Background ==
Lyrically, "The Whistler," like many songs on Songs from the Wood, was inspired by Anderson's interest in English folklore and mythology during this period, spurred in part by a book on the subject that he had received from Tull promoter Jo Lustig. Anderson explained, "It was me having a little fun with traditions and myths and legends, all of which could be very twee and, oh well, yes, seriously wet." The song notably features Anderson on tin whistle, reflecting the song's titular character. Keyboardist Dee Palmer, formerly David Palmer, claimed to have contributed to the arrangement of the song.

In a 1989 interview, Anderson elaborated on the song, "I have tried not to be associated with any period. People identify what they like in my songs. I rather like to think there is something timeless about what we do. In a song like 'Whistler,' it's a sort of sci-fi format. We're certainly not talking about now, but it could be a long time ahead or a long time past."

== Release ==
"The Whistler" was released on Jethro Tull's 1977 album Songs from the Wood. Additionally, the song was released in many countries, including the US and UK, as a single. The single's B-side was the non-album track "Strip Cartoon," which was an outtake from the Songs from the Wood sessions. Though it did not chart in the UK, the single became a minor chart hit in the US, reaching number 59.

A music video was produced for the song, featuring the band performing the track in the studio. The band is dressed to reflect the song's folkish style, with Anderson wearing what he described as a "frivolous pantomime cossie," guitarist Martin Barre wearing a monocle, and keyboardist Dee Palmer using an antique pipe. In the video, Anderson sings the song while sitting on a stool because of his struggles with shingles. He explained, "['The Whistler'] was released as a single and my most vivid recollection of that is that I had shingles when we recorded the video for it. That was one occasion when I was sitting on a stool because I simply couldn't stand up, I was so ill."

== Reception ==
Louder described the song as the album's "most effusive track," praising "the whip-crack of Barriemore Barlow's snare and Ian Anderson's goggling wordplay." Jordan Blum of PopMatters praised the song as "haunting," while Daniel de Visé of Allmusic described it as "a breathless, beautiful song". Author Scott Allen Nollen praised the song's "incredible atmosphere" as well as Barre's guitar work and Anderson's tin whistle playing. 50 Third and 3rd called it "a curious choice for a single release, but another beautiful arrangement with complex and contrasting rhythms adding spice and a fabulous whistle performance from Ian Anderson."

== Charts ==
Chart (1977)	Peak position
US Billboard Hot 100	59
CAN RPM Magazine	71
