= Catfish Rising =

1991 studio album by Jethro Tull

Studio album by Jethro Tull
- Released: 2 September 1991
- Recorded: Early 1991
- Genres: Progressive rock; hard rock; blues rock
- Length: 42:49; 60:01 (CD/Cassette)
- Label: Chrysalis
- Producer: Jethro Tull

Jethro Tull chronology
| Live at Hammersmith '84 (1990) | Catfish Rising (1991) | A Little Light Music (1992) |

Singles from Catfish Rising
- 1. "This Is Not Love" Released: 5 August 1991; 2. "Still Loving You Tonight" Released: 16 September 1991 (EU); 3. "Rocks on the Road" Released: 9 March 1992

Professional ratings
Review scores
| Source | Rating |
|---|---|
| Allmusic | 3/5 stars |
| The Encyclopedia of Popular Music | 2/5 stars |

Catfish Rising is the eighteenth studio album by the British rock group Jethro Tull, released on 2 September 1991. It is the first Tull album to feature keyboardist Andrew Giddings. The album continues the hard rock and blues sound of the previous two albums.

== Track listing ==
=== Vinyl edition ===
All tracks are written by Ian Anderson.

Side one
| No. | Title | Length |
|---|---|---|
| 1. | "This Is Not Love" | 3:56 |
| 2. | "Occasional Demons" | 3:48 |
| 3. | "Rocks on the Road" | 5:30 |
| 4. | "Thinking Round Corners" | 3:31 |
| 5. | "Still Loving You Tonight" | 4:30 |

Side two
| No. | Title | Length |
|---|---|---|
| 1. | "Doctor to My Disease" | 4:34 |
| 2. | "Like a Tall Thin Girl" | 3:36 |
| 3. | "Sparrow on the Schoolyard Wall" | 5:21 |
| 4. | "Roll Yer Own" | 4:25 |
| 5. | "Gold-Tipped Boots, Black Jacket and Tie" | 3:38 |

Limited edition bonus 12", side one
| No. | Title | Length |
|---|---|---|
| 1. | "When Jesus Came to Play" | 5:04 |
| 2. | "Sleeping with the Dog" | 4:25 |

Limited edition bonus 12", side two
| No. | Title | Length |
|---|---|---|
| 1. | "White Innocence" | 7:43 |

=== CD edition ===
| No. | Title | Length |
|---|---|---|
| 1. | "This Is Not Love" | 3:56 |
| 2. | "Occasional Demons" | 3:48 |
| 3. | "Roll Yer Own" | 4:25 |
| 4. | "Rocks on the Road" | 5:30 |
| 5. | "Sparrow on the Schoolyard Wall" | 5:21 |
| 6. | "Thinking Round Corners" | 3:31 |
| 7. | "Still Loving You Tonight" | 4:30 |
| 8. | "Doctor to My Disease" | 4:34 |
| 9. | "Like a Tall Thin Girl" | 3:36 |
| 10. | "White Innocence" | 7:43 |
| 11. | "Sleeping with the Dog" | 4:25 |
| 12. | "Gold-Tipped Boots, Black Jacket and Tie" | 3:38 |
| 13. | "When Jesus Came to Play" | 5:04 |

2006 remaster bonus tracks
| No. | Title | Length |
|---|---|---|
| 14. | "Night in the Wilderness" | 4:06 |
| 15. | "Jump Start" (live; recorded at the Tower Theatre, Philadelphia, 25 November 1987) | 7:49 |

- "Night in the Wilderness" appeared as the B-side to many Catfish Rising -era singles.
- The live version of "Jump Start" appeared as the B-side to several single releases of "This Is Not Love".

== Personnel ==
- Ian Anderson – vocals, acoustic guitar, electric guitars, acoustic mandolin, electric mandolin, flute, keyboards, drums, percussion
- Martin Barre – electric guitar
- Dave Pegg – acoustic bass guitar, electric bass guitar
- Doane Perry – drums, percussion

Additional personnel

- Andy Giddings – keyboards (on tracks 1, 4 & 8)
- Foss Patterson – keyboards (on track 10)
- John Bundrick – keyboards (on track 11)
- Matt Pegg – bass guitar (on tracks 1, 4 & 7)
- Scott Hunter – drums, percussion (on track 5)

== Charts ==
| Chart (1991) | Peak position |
|---|---|
| Australian Albums (ARIA) | 153 |
| Austrian Albums (Ö3 Austria) | 36 |
| Finnish Albums (The Official Finnish Charts) | 30 |
| German Albums (Offizielle Top 100) | 21 |
| Norwegian Albums (VG-lista) | 12 |
| Swedish Albums (Sverigetopplistan) | 48 |
| Swiss Albums (Schweizer Hitparade) | 12 |
| UK Albums (Official Charts) | 27 |
| US Billboard 200 | 88 |
