= Andrew Giddings =

British musician

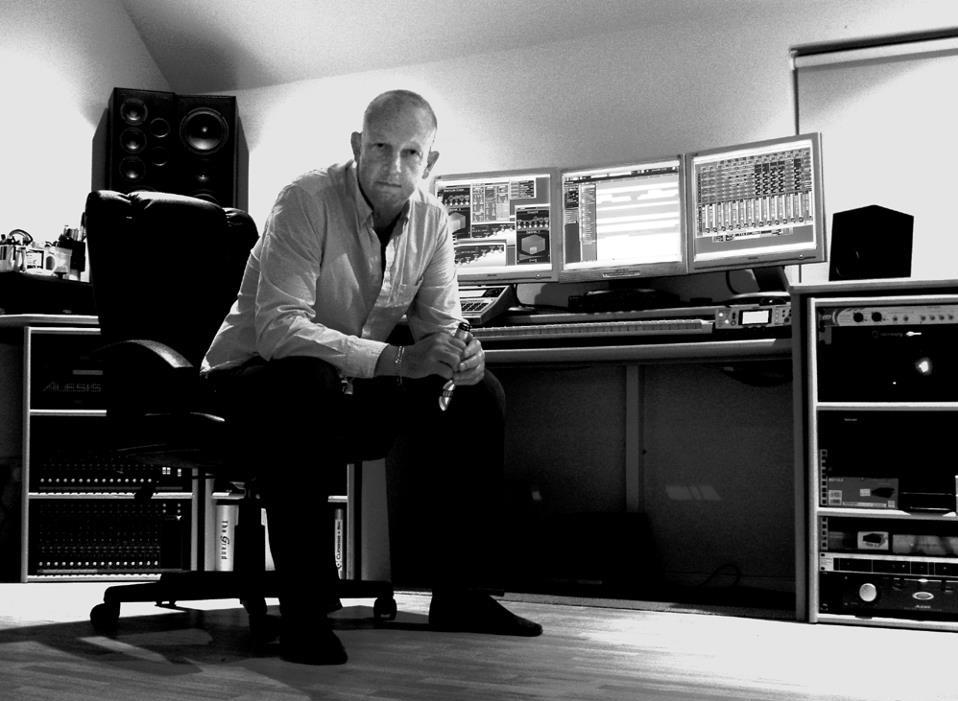

Background information
- Born: Andrew Giddings; 10 July 1963 (age 62); Pembury, Kent, England
- Genres: Progressive rock, folk rock, hard rock, electronic
- Occupations: Musician, songwriter, producer
- Instrument: keyboards
- Years active: 1980–present
- Labels: Chrysalis, EMI

Andrew Giddings (born 10 July 1963) is an English musician. He primarily plays keyboard instruments and is best known as a former member of British rock group Jethro Tull, for whom he was the longest serving keyboardist.

== Early life ==
Giddings was born in Pembury, Kent, England. His mother enrolled him in piano lessons at an early age, which he quit by his early teens in favour of learning to play pop music by ear. After leaving school, he found employment in a musical instrument store.

== Career ==
Giddings began his professional music career in 1980, playing with the groups Profusion, The Chase, and The Brothers Grimm, later forming his own band X-statique. He had a brief solo period backing artists from the past, recording and touring with Eric Burdon's band for about five years. Later he recorded with various artists including Leo Sayer, Sniff 'n' the Tears, Vyktoria Keating, Willy Porter, and Jon Anderson of Yes.

Giddings joined Jethro Tull in 1991, succeeding Maartin Allcock. He played on the albums Catfish Rising, Jethro Tull In Concert, The Beacons Bottom Tapes, Roots to Branches, J-Tull Dot Com, Living with the Past, The Jethro Tull Christmas Album and Aqualung Live. He toured with the band all over the world until 2007 when he was succeeded by John O’Hara. Giddings also played with Ian Anderson on two of the latter's solo albums, Divinities: Twelve Dances with God and The Secret Language of Birds, also on solo albums with Martin Barre.

After leaving Jethro Tull, Giddings produced a solo album in 2010, Picture This, a collection of his keyboard and electronic music. Later he provided keyboard and orchestration services via e-sessions, and wrote and recorded music for film and television at his digital studio in Oxfordshire.

Giddings appears on Jethro Tull's 2025 album, Curious Ruminant.
