= The Jethro Tull Christmas Album =

2003 studio album by Jethro Tull

Studio album (Christmas) by Jethro Tull
- Released: 30 September 2003 (US)
- Genre: Progressive rock; folk rock; jazz fusion; Christmas
- Length: 1:02:31; 2:06:29 (with Christmas at St Bride's 2008)
- Label: Fuel 2000, RandM
- Producer: Ian Anderson

Jethro Tull chronology
Essential (2003)	The Jethro Tull Christmas Album (2003)	The Zealot Gene (2022)

Professional ratings
Review scores
Source	Rating
Allmusic	4/5 stars
The Encyclopedia of Popular Music	3/5 stars
Rolling Stone	(favorable)

The Jethro Tull Christmas Album is the twenty-first studio album released by Jethro Tull, on 30 September 2003. This was the band's last studio album for 19 years (until the release of The Zealot Gene in 2022), as well as the last album to feature the lineup of Ian Anderson, guitarist Martin Barre (and his last album with the group), bassist Jonathan Noyce, keyboardist Andrew Giddings, and drummer Doane Perry.

== Content ==
The Jethro Tull Christmas Album is a mix of new material, re-recordings of Tull's own suitably themed material and arrangements of traditional Christmas music. In 2009, the live album Christmas at St Bride's 2008 was included with the original album on CD.

Of the opening song, Birthday Card at Christmas, Ian Anderson has said:

"My daughter Gael, like millions of other unfortunates, celebrates her birthday within a gnat's whisker of Christmas. Overshadowed by the Great Occasion, such birthdays can be flat, perfunctory and fleetingly token in their uneventful passing. The daunting party and festive celebration of the Christian calendar overshadows too, some might argue, the humble birthday of one Mr. J. Christ. Funny old 25ths, Decembers…"

== Track listing ==
No.	Title	Length
1.	"Birthday Card at Christmas" (Ian Anderson)	3:37
2.	"Holly Herald" ("The Holly and the Ivy" (Trad.) / "Hark! The Herald Angels Sing" (F. Mendelssohn); instrumental medley arranged by Anderson)	4:16
3.	"A Christmas Song" (Anderson)	2:47
4.	"Another Christmas Song" (Anderson)	3:31
5.	"God Rest Ye Merry, Gentlemen" (Trad. instrumental arranged by Anderson)	4:35
6.	"Jack Frost and the Hooded Crow" (Anderson)	3:37
7.	"Last Man at the Party" (Anderson)	4:48
8.	"Weathercock" (Anderson)	4:17
9.	"Pavane" (Instrumental, Gabriel Fauré, arranged by Anderson)	4:19
10.	"First Snow on Brooklyn" (Anderson)	4:57
11.	"Greensleeved" (Trad. instrumental based on "Greensleeves". Arranged by Anderson)	2:39
12.	"Fire at Midnight" (Anderson)	2:26
13.	"We Five Kings" (Instrumental "We Three Kings", Rev. J. Hopkins, arranged by Anderson)	3:16
14.	"Ring Out Solstice Bells" (Anderson)	4:04
15.	"Bourée" (Instrumental J. S. Bach, arranged by Anderson)	4:25
16.	"A Winter Snowscape" (Instrumental, Martin Barre)	4:57

- Tracks 3, 4, 6, 8, 12, 14, and 15 are all re-recordings of previously released pieces. 'Bourée', however, has significant alterations to the musical arrangement.
- 'God Rest Ye Merry, Gentlemen' (Track 5) has been played in concert many times over the years: this is the first studio version.

=== Christmas at St Bride's 2008 ===
Recorded live at St Bride's Church

No.	Title	Length
17.	"Weathercock" (Ian Anderson)	4:41
18.	"Introduction: Rev. George Pitcher / Choir: What Cheer" (William Walton)	3:32
19.	"A Christmas Song" (Anderson)	3:19
20.	"Living in These Hard Times" (Anderson)	3:44
21.	"Choir: Silent Night" (Traditional)	3:06
22.	"Reading: Ian Anderson, Marmion" (Sir Walter Scott)	2:17
23.	"Jack in the Green" (Anderson)	2:33
24.	"Another Christmas Song" (Anderson)	3:56
25.	"Reading: Gavin Esler, God's Grandeur" (Gerard Manley Hopkins)	1:50
26.	"Choir: Oh, Come All Ye Faithful" (Traditional)	3:50
27.	"Reading: Mark Billingham, The Ballad of The Breadman" (Charles Causley)	3:33
28.	"A Winter Snowscape" (Martin Barre)	3:39
29.	"Reading: Andrew Lincoln, Christmas" (Sir John Betjeman)	3:12
30.	"Fires at Midnight" (Anderson)	3:38
31.	"We Five Kings" (Instrumental "We Three Kings", Rev. J. Hopkins, arranged by Anderson)	3:19
32.	"Choir: Gaudete" (Trad. arranged by Anderson)	3:39
33.	"God Rest Ye Merry, Gentlemen / Thick as a Brick" (Trad. arranged by Anderson / Anderson)	10:25
Total length:		1:03:58

== Personnel ==
- Ian Anderson – vocals, flute, acoustic guitar, mandolin, piccolo, percussion
- Martin Barre – acoustic guitar, electric guitar
- Jonathan Noyce – bass guitar
- Andrew Giddings – keyboards, accordion
- Doane Perry – drums, percussion

Additional personnel

- James Duncan – additional drums and percussion
- Dave Pegg – additional bass guitar and mandolin
- The Sturcz String Quartet:

- Gábor Csonka – 1st violin
- Péter Szilágyi – 2nd violin
- Gyula Benkő – viola
- András Sturcz – cello (leader)

== Charts ==
2003 chart performance for The Jethro Tull Christmas Album
Chart (2003)	Peak position
German Albums (Offizielle Top 100)	51
US Top Holiday Albums (Billboard)	35

2024 chart performance for The Jethro Tull Christmas Album
Chart (2024)	Peak position
German Albums (Offizielle Top 100)	12
UK Albums (OCC)	73
Scottish Albums (OCC)	20
