= Living with the Past =

2002 live album by Jethro Tull

Live album & DVD by Jethro Tull
- Released: 30 April 2002 (US)
- Recorded: Oct 1989 – Jan 2002
- Genre: Progressive rock; hard rock; folk rock
- Length: 71:43
- Label: Fuel 2000
- Producer: Ian Anderson

Jethro Tull chronology
The Very Best of Jethro Tull (2001)	Living with the Past (2002)	Essential (2003)

Professional ratings
Review scores
Source	Rating
Allmusic	3/5 stars
The Encyclopedia of Popular Music	3/5 stars

Living with the Past is a live album by Jethro Tull. The first half (first LP of the 2019 vinyl reissue) contains material from the Hammersmith Apollo performance on 25 November 2001 and features songs from different eras of Tull's history as well as some pieces from Ian Anderson's solo albums: "The Habanero Reel", "The Water Carrier" (DVD only) from The Secret Language of Birds and the instrumental "In the Grip of Stronger Stuff" from Divinities: Twelve Dances with God. Aside from "Cheerio" (the conclusion from the Hammersmith concert), other recordings are collected in the second half.

The CD and DVD both include large chunks of the Hammersmith concert, but the selection is not identical: "The Habanero Reel" and "In the Grip of Stronger Stuff" only appear on the CD, while "Cross-Eyed Mary", "Thick as a Brick", "Beside Myself" (bonus track), "Hunt by Numbers", "Bourée", "The Water Carrier", "A New Day Yesterday", "Budapest" and "New Jig" are all exclusive to the DVD. Also played at the gig, but available on neither format, are "Set-Aside" (another Anderson solo track) and "Pibroch (Cap in Hand)".

Some of the additional recordings such as the acoustic session also appear in both formats. The DVD has some video effects overlaid on top of the performances, sometimes also mixing in footage from open air concerts (combined with the audio from the Hammersmith Apollo).

== Track listing (CD) ==
1. Intro – 0:22
2. "My Sunday Feeling" – 4:00
3. "Roots to Branches" – 5:34
4. "Jack in the Green" – 2:40
5. "The Habanero Reel" – 4:03
6. "Sweet Dream" – 4:54
7. "In the Grip of Stronger Stuff" (Instrumental) – 2:57
8. "Aqualung" – 8:20
9. "Locomotive Breath" – 5:26
10. "Living in the Past" – 3:27
11. "Protect and Survive" (Instrumental) – 1:01
12. "Nothing Is Easy" – 5:16
13. "Wond'ring Aloud" – 1:54
14. "Life Is a Long Song" – 3:32
15. "A Christmas Song" – 3:05
16. "Cheap Day Return" – 1:12
17. "Mother Goose" – 1:57
18. "Dot Com" – 4:28
19. "Fat Man" – 5:06
20. "Some Day the Sun Won't Shine for You" – 4:13
21. "Cheerio" – 1:36

== Track listing (DVD) ==
1. My Sunday Feeling
2. Cross Eyed Mary
3. Roots to Branches
4. Someday the Sun Won't Shine for You (Class of '68 reunion)
5. Jack in the Green
6. Thick as a Brick
7. Wond'ring Aloud (acoustic session)
8. Sweet Dream
9. Hunt by Numbers
10. Bourée
11. A Song for Jeffrey
12. The Water Carrier
13. A New Day Yesterday
14. Life is a Long Song (acoustic session)
15. Budapest
16. New Jig
17. Aqualung
18. Locomotive Breath
19. Living in the Past
20. Protect and Survive
21. Cheerio

Extra features

1. John Barleycorn (Fairport Convention featuring Ian Anderson, filmed at the Cropredy Festival August 2001)
2. Blind Eye (Uriah Heep featuring Ian Anderson, filmed at the Mermaid Theatre, London, December 2000)
3. Photo Gallery
4. Tull Talk
5. Out takes
6. DVT (advert warning of the dangers of Deep Vein Thrombosis, starring Ian Anderson)
7. My Sunday Feeling (original line-up Class of '68 reunion)
8. Beside Myself (Virtual Ticket Window - filmed at Hammersmith; three different viewing angles available)

== Notes ==
- US release was originally scheduled for 23 April 2002, but was delayed a week
- UK CD release 6 May 2002
- German CD release 13 May 2002
- US DVD release 14 May 2002
- Tracks 1 - 11 and 21 recorded at Hammersmith Apollo London 25 November 2001
- Track 12 recorded at L'Olympia Paris France 22 October 1999
- Tracks 13 and 14 recorded at a stately home January 2002
- Tracks 15 - 17 recorded in the dressing room of Hallenstadion Zurich Switzerland 13 October 1989
- Tracks 18 and 19 recorded for 2 Meter Sessions RTL Holland at Wisseloord Studios, Hilversum, Netherlands 19 October 1999
- Track 20 recorded at Kellys, Leamington Spa, England 29 January 2002

== Personnel ==
Track numbers refer to the CD.

Jethro Tull

- Ian Anderson – concert and bamboo flutes, vocals, acoustic guitar, harmonica, mandolin (plays on all tracks)
- Martin Barre – electric guitar, acoustic guitar, flute on track 19 (plays on tracks 1 – 14, 18 – 19 and 21)
- Andrew Giddings – keyboards, accordion (plays on tracks 1 – 14, 18 – 19 and 21)
- Jonathan Noyce – bass (plays on tracks 1 – 14, 18 – 19 and 21)
- Dave Pegg – mandolin, bass (plays on tracks 15 – 17)
- Doane Perry – drums, percussion (plays on tracks 1 – 14, 18 – 19 and 21)
- Mick Abrahams – electric guitar, acoustic guitar, vocals (plays on track 20)
- Glenn Cornick – bass (plays on track 20)
- Clive Bunker – drums (plays on track 20)

Guest musicians

- James Duncan – drums on track 14
- Brian Thomas – violin on tracks 13 – 14
- Justine Tomlinson – violin on tracks 13 – 14
- Malcolm Henderson – viola on tracks 13 – 14
- Juliet Tomlinson – cello on tracks 13 – 14

== Charts ==
Chart (2002)	Peak position
German Albums (Offizielle Top 100)	75
UK Independent Albums (OCC)	47

== Certifications ==
=== DVD ===
Region	Certification	Certified units/sales
Australia (ARIA)	Gold	7,500^{^}
Canada (Music Canada)	Gold	5,000^{^}
United States (RIAA)	Gold	50,000^{^}
^{^} Shipments figures based on certification alone.

== See also ==
- Living in the Past (1972)
- Nothing Is Easy: Live at the Isle of Wight 1970 (2004)
- Ian Anderson Plays the Orchestral Jethro Tull (2005)
- Aqualung Live (2005)
- Live at Madison Square Garden 1978 (2009)
