= Songs from the Wood =

1977 studio album by Jethro Tull

Studio album by Jethro Tull
- Released: 11 February 1977
- Recorded: 14 September 1976 – 16 November 1976
- Studios: Morgan Studios, London
- Genres: Folk rock; progressive folk; progressive rock; hard rock
- Length: 41:17
- Label: Chrysalis
- Producer: Ian Anderson

Jethro Tull chronology
Too Old to Rock 'n' Roll: Too Young to Die! (1976)	Songs from the Wood (1977)	Repeat – The Best of Jethro Tull – Vol II (1977)

Singles from Songs from the Wood
- 1. "Ring Out, Solstice Bells (EP)" Released: 22 November 1976; 2. "The Whistler" Released: 4 February 1977; 3. "Songs from the Wood" Released: 19 May 1977 (Aus and NZ)

Songs from the Wood is the tenth studio album by British progressive rock band Jethro Tull, released on 11 February 1977 by Chrysalis Records. The album is considered to be the first of three folk rock albums released by the band at the end of the 1970s, followed by Heavy Horses (1978) and Stormwatch (1979).

Drawing inspiration from English folklore and countryside living, the album signalled a resumption of the band's wide-ranging folk rock style which combined traditional instruments and melodies with hard rock drums, synthesisers and electric guitars, all laid in the band's complex progressive rock template. The album was the first Jethro Tull album to include Dee Palmer as an official member of the band; after eight years of serving as the band's orchestral arranger, Palmer had joined as a second keyboardist in early 1976.

Songs From the Wood was well received by critics who considered it a return to form. The album reached number 13 in the UK and number 8 in the United States. A single from the album, "The Whistler", was also the band's last US Hot 100 chart entry, peaking at number 59. Another song, "Ring Out, Solstice Bells", was released ahead of the album on an EP of the same title for the 1976 Christmas season, peaking at number 28 in the UK.

== Recording ==
The band began recording on 14 September 1976, recording "Ring Out, Solstice Bells" and finished on 16 November 1976, finishing "Jack-in-the-Green". All tracks were recorded in Studio 2 of Morgan Studios (except "Jack-in-the-Green", recorded in Studio 3 with Anderson on all instruments), the same studio where the band had recorded the majority of their discography up to that point. The album marked a return for the band to recording in the UK after having recorded their previous two albums abroad in Monaco.

Compared to previous Jethro Tull albums, Songs From the Wood saw greater writing contributions from other members of the band besides Anderson, particularly from new keyboardist Dee Palmer and guitarist Martin Barre. Palmer wrote significant portions of several songs, including the title track, "Hunting Girl", "Velvet Green", "Ring Out, Solstice Bells" and "Pibroch (Cap in Hand)" and also introduced the portative pipe organ to the rest of the band, an instrument which became a major element of the album's classical folk sound.

The band made use of a variety of other instruments and recording techniques to contribute to the album's folk theme, including medieval-era percussion played by Barlow such as nakers and a tabor as well as a reverse echo guitar effect played by Barre on "Pibroch (Cap in Hand)" to imitate the sound of bagpipes. "Ring Out, Solstice Bells" was recorded with the intention of being a Christmas single. However Chrysalis Records disliked that the song was in 7/4 time and asked the band to re-record the song in the more common 4/4 time, a suggestion which Anderson said that the band "weren't particularly pleased with." The band re-recorded the song, now re-titled "Magic Bells" at Lansdowne Studios with Mike Batt of the Wombles producing, however the decision was eventually made by Chrysalis to scrap the new version and release the original instead.

One song recorded during the sessions for the album was cut, initially titled "Dark Ages" (the same name of a different song later featured on the band's 1979 album Stormwatch), the track remained unreleased until 2017 when it was included on the 40th Anniversary "Country Set" edition of the album, where it was given the title "Old Aces Die Hard" by Anderson.

The band have identified the writing and recording sessions for the album as being a high point in personal relations within the band. Anderson credited the familiar surroundings of Morgan Studios with creating "a more relaxed and harmonious atmosphere in the band" with drummer Barrie Barlow agreeing that "I think we were indeed more settled and happier to be home." Palmer recalled that "On every measure the whole of that album was recorded in an atmosphere of great camaraderie and joy... Everybody was friends, everybody was happy." The band held a wrap party upon completion of the album's mixing, described by Anderson as "one of the very few occasions when we did have a slightly triumphal celebration of the finished thing."

== Musical style and themes ==
Filled with imagery from medieval Britain (especially in the "Jack-in-the-Green", "Cup of Wonder", and "Ring Out, Solstice Bells" lyrics), and ornamental folk arrangement (as in "Velvet Green" and "Fire at Midnight"), Songs From the Wood was a departure from the hard rock of earlier Jethro Tull material, though it still retained some of the band's older, progressive sound.

Anderson's inspiration to pursue folk was inspired by recent changes in his personal life; he had recently re-married and purchased a farm estate in rural Buckinghamshire, giving him "an opportunity to evaluate and reflect upon the cultural and historical significance of making that commitment to English residency." Anderson was also partly inspired by the book Folklore, Myths and Legends of Britain which was given to him by Jethro Tull's then manager Jo Lustig in 1976. According to Anderson, the book "certainly gave me thoughts about the elements of characters and stories that played out in my songwriting on the Songs From the Wood album, which then carried on over to the Heavy Horses album and even beyond that into the Stormwatch album."

== Critical reception ==
Professional ratings
Review scores
Source	Rating
AllMusic	4/5 stars
The Encyclopedia of Popular Music	4/5 stars
NME	(Very favourable)
The Rolling Stone Album Guide	3/5 stars

In a retrospective review, AllMusic called Songs from the Wood "the prettiest record Jethro Tull released at least since Thick as a Brick". Paul Stump lauded the album in his History of Progressive Rock, saying that "the barbed, rickety grandeur that Tull had left behind with Benefit had been rebottled in punchy numbers with enough melodic contours to satisfy latter-day FM-radio demands. Once again, the band's riffs are unremarkable, but counterpointed – such as with synthesisers playing off mandolin on the title track – and the impact is mesmerizing." He also praised the depth of the soundstage, the emphasis of the folk element in the lyrics, and the way riffs are shared around the instrumental ensemble.

In 2014, Songs from the Wood was included in the list The 100 Greatest Prog Albums of All Time by Prog magazine at number 76. In 2000, it was voted number 520 in Colin Larkin's All Time Top 1000 Albums.

== Legacy ==
"Ring Out, Solstice Bells" has become popular as a Christmas song in the United Kingdom. It has been featured in lists of classic and favourite Christmas songs; a re-recorded version appears on The Jethro Tull Christmas Album.

Members of the band have ranked the album highly in retrospect, with Anderson counting it as among his top five personal favourite Jethro Tull albums.

== Cover ==
Although the front cover carries no credit to the effect, the back cover features the credit "front cover painting by Jay L. Lee". In fact, it is a photo on which outlines, lines and contours have simply been drawn with a pen (see tree branches, the dog's snout and Anderson's boots), with paint only occasionally added over the photo (as in the fire). The fact that this is a photo and not a painting is backed up by several other similar photos from the same photo session, some of which were used in the programme for the British tour in 1977, as well as on the concert poster.

The credit "painting by ..." is probably based on a typical trick by Ian Anderson, who likes to joke with his fans. "Painting by" could also only refer to the post-processing of the photo. The LP cover depicts Ian Anderson sitting on a campfire after a successful hunt with a dog and prey. The full wording on the front cover is "Jethro Tull // with kitchen prose, gutter rhymes and divers // songs from the wood".

== Track listing ==
=== 1977 original release ===
All tracks are written by Ian Anderson with additional material by Martin Barre and Dee Palmer.

Side one
No.	Title	Length
1.	"Songs from the Wood"	4:52
2.	"Jack-in-the-Green"	2:27
3.	"Cup of Wonder"	4:30
4.	"Hunting Girl"	5:11
5.	"Ring Out, Solstice Bells"	3:43
Total length:		20:43

Side two
No.	Title	Length
6.	"Velvet Green"	6:03
7.	"The Whistler"	3:30
8.	"Pibroch (Cap in Hand)"	8:35
9.	"Fire at Midnight"	2:26
Total length:		41:17

2003 bonus tracks
No.	Title	Length
10.	"Beltane"	5:19
11.	"Velvet Green" (Live)	5:56
Total length:		52:32

== 2017 40th Anniversary The Country Set Deluxe Edition ==
On 17 May 2017, Jethro Tull released a five disc "bookset" version of Songs from the Wood with a 96-page booklet that includes a track-by-track annotation of the album and its associated recordings by Ian Anderson. It is similar to the band's other 40th Anniversary reissues, with the first disc containing another Steven Wilson stereo remix and the previously unreleased songs "Old Aces Die Hard" and "Working John, Working Joe". The second and third discs contain 22 previously unreleased live tracks, recorded on the American leg of the 1977 Songs from the Wood Tour, from 21 November (Landover, Maryland) and 6 December (Boston), remixed to stereo by Jakko Jakszyk. The set also includes DVDs.

The second DVD includes a complete concert movie made from video originally recorded for projecting on onstage screens at the Landover show. Because the first audio multitrack reel from the Landover show wasn't available, Jakszyk went to great lengths to sync the footage with audio from Maryland for the first four songs. The bonus track "Beethoven's Ninth" is from the Landover show as well, but excluded from the film because it was never professionally recorded and the audio is of inferior quality.

CD 1: Steven Wilson stereo remix of the album and associated recordings
No.	Title	Length
1.	"Songs from the Wood"	4:55
2.	"Jack-in-the-Green"	2:31
3.	"Cup of Wonder"	4:34
4.	"Hunting Girl"	5:10
5.	"Ring Out, Solstice Bells"	3:48
6.	"Velvet Green"	6:05
7.	"The Whistler"	3:31
8.	"Pibroch (Cap in Hand)"	8:35
9.	"Fire at Midnight"	2:27
10.	"Old Aces Die Hard (previously unreleased)"	8:41
11.	"Working John, Working Joe (previously unreleased)"	5:11
12.	"Magic Bells (Ring Out, Solstice Bells)"	3:25
13.	"Songs from the Wood (unedited master)"	4:53
14.	"Fire at Midnight (previously unreleased unedited master)"	2:35
15.	"One Brown Mouse (early version)"	3:35
16.	"Strip Cartoon"	3:19
17.	"The Whistler (US stereo single mix)"	3:32
Total length:		1:16:47

CD 2: Live in Concert 1977
No.	Title	Length
1.	"Wond’ring Aloud"	2:33
2.	"Skating Away on the Thin Ice of the New Day"	4:04
3.	"Jack-in-the-Green"	3:14
4.	"Thick as a Brick"	13:15
5.	"Songs from the Wood"	6:01
6.	"Instrumental"	2:27
7.	"Drum solo improvisation"	4:16
8.	"To Cry You a Song"	2:33
9.	"A New Day Yesterday"	2:54
10.	"Flute solo improvisation, interpolating "God Rest Ye Gentlemen"/"Bourée""	8:14
11.	"Living in the Past / A New Day Yesterday (reprise)"	2:32
Total length:		2:08:50

CD 3: Live in Concert 1977
No.	Title	Length
1.	"Velvet Green"	6:26
2.	"Hunting Girl"	5:39
3.	"Too Old to Rock ‘n’ Roll: Too Young to Die"	4:16
4.	"Minstrel in the Gallery"	5:39
5.	"Cross-Eyed Mary"	3:45
6.	"Aqualung"	8:32
7.	"Instrumental improvisation"	3:31
8.	"Wind-Up"	4:54
9.	"Back Door Angels / Guitar improvisation / Wind Up (reprise)"	7:15
10.	"Locomotive Breath"	5:47
11.	"Land of Hope and Glory / Improvisation / Back Door Angels (reprise)"	4:00
Total length:		3:08:34

DVD 1: Steven Wilson 5.1 surround and stereo mixes and flat transfer of the original stereo and quadraphonic mixes of the album and selected associated recordings
No.	Title	Length
1.	"Songs from the Wood (Steven Wilson remix in 96/24 PCM stereo)"	4:55
2.	"Jack-in-the-Green (Steven Wilson remix in 96/24 PCM stereo)"	2:32
3.	"Cup of Wonder (Steven Wilson remix in 96/24 PCM stereo)"	4:34
4.	"Hunting Girl (Steven Wilson remix in 96/24 PCM stereo)"	5:10
5.	"Ring Out, Solstice Bells (Steven Wilson remix in 96/24 PCM stereo)"	3:48
6.	"Velvet Green (Steven Wilson remix in 96/24 PCM stereo)"	6:05
7.	"The Whistler (Steven Wilson remix in 96/24 PCM stereo)"	3:32
8.	"Pibroch (Cap in Hand) (Steven Wilson remix in 96/24 PCM stereo)"	8:36
9.	"Fire at Midnight (Steven Wilson remix in 96/24 PCM stereo)"	2:28
10.	"Old Aces Die Hard (Steven Wilson remix in 96/24 PCM stereo)"	8:41
11.	"Working John, Working Joe (Steven Wilson remix in 96/24 PCM stereo)"	5:12
12.	"Magic Bells (Ring Out, Solstice Bells) (Steven Wilson remix in 96/24 PCM stereo)"	3:25
13.	"Songs from the Wood (unedited master) (Steven Wilson remix in 96/24 PCM stereo)"	4:53
14.	"Fire at Midnight (unedited master) (Steven Wilson remix in 96/24 PCM stereo)"	2:36
15.	"One Brown Mouse (early version) (Steven Wilson remix in 96/24 PCM stereo)"	3:35
16.	"Strip Cartoon (Steven Wilson remix in 96/24 PCM stereo)"	3:19
17.	"Songs from the Wood (Steven Wilson DD/DTS 5.1 surround remix)"	4:55
18.	"Jack-in-the-Green (Steven Wilson DD/DTS 5.1 surround remix)"	2:32
19.	"Cup of Wonder (Steven Wilson DD/DTS 5.1 surround remix)"	4:34
20.	"Hunting Girl (Steven Wilson DD/DTS 5.1 surround remix)"	5:10
21.	"Ring Out, Solstice Bells (Steven Wilson DD/DTS 5.1 surround remix)"	3:48
22.	"Velvet Green (Steven Wilson DD/DTS 5.1 surround remix)"	6:05
23.	"The Whistler (Steven Wilson DD/DTS 5.1 surround remix)"	3:32
24.	"Pibroch (Cap in Hand) (Steven Wilson DD/DTS 5.1 surround remix)"	8:36
25.	"Fire at Midnight (Steven Wilson DD/DTS 5.1 surround remix)"	2:28
26.	"Old Aces Die Hard (Steven Wilson DD/DTS 5.1 surround remix)"	8:41
27.	"Working John, Working Joe (Steven Wilson DD/DTS 5.1 surround remix)"	5:12
28.	"Magic Bells (Ring Out, Solstice Bells) (Steven Wilson DD/DTS 5.1 surround remix)"	3:25
29.	"One Brown Mouse (early version) (Steven Wilson DD/DTS 5.1 surround remix)"	3:34
30.	"Strip Cartoon (Steven Wilson DD/DTS 5.1 surround remix)"	3:19
31.	"Songs from the Wood (96/24 PCM flat transfer – original stereo master)"	4:56
32.	"Jack-in-the-Green (96/24 PCM flat transfer – original stereo master)"	2:32
33.	"Cup of Wonder (96/24 PCM flat transfer – original stereo master)"	4:34
34.	"Hunting Girl (96/24 PCM flat transfer – original stereo master)"	5:14
35.	"Ring Out, Solstice Bells (96/24 PCM flat transfer – original stereo master)"	3:50
36.	"Velvet Green (96/24 PCM flat transfer – original stereo master)"	6:05
37.	"The Whistler (96/24 PCM flat transfer – original stereo master)"	3:33
38.	"Pibroch (Cap in Hand) (96/24 PCM flat transfer – original stereo master)"	8:37
39.	"Fire at Midnight (96/24 PCM flat transfer – original stereo master)"	2:31
40.	"Songs from the Wood (Flat transfer of original quad master – DTS/DD 4.0 surround)"	4:56
41.	"Jack-in-the-Green (Flat transfer of original quad master – DTS/DD 4.0 surround)"	2:33
42.	"Velvet Green (Flat transfer of original quad master – DTS/DD 4.0 surround)"	6:08
43.	"The Whistler (Flat transfer of original quad master – DTS/DD 4.0 surround)"	3:34
Total length:		3:18:25

DVD 2: Live at The Capital Centre, Landover, Maryland, 21 November 1977
No.	Title	Length
1.	"Wond’ring Aloud"	2:35
2.	"Skating Away on the Thin Ice of the New Day"	4:18
3.	"Jack-in-the-Green"	3:31
4.	"Thick as a Brick"	13:47
5.	"Songs from the Wood"	6:04
6.	"Instrumental/drum solo improvisation"	6:44
7.	"To Cry You a Song"	2:34
8.	"A New Day Yesterday"	2:54
9.	"Flute solo improvisation, interpolating "God Rest Ye Gentlemen"/"Bourée""	8:15
10.	"Living in the Past/ A New Day Yesterday (reprise)"	2:36
11.	"Velvet Green"	6:26
12.	"Hunting Girl"	5:49
13.	"Too Old to Rock ‘n’ Roll: Too Young to Die"	4:23
14.	"Minstrel in the Gallery"	5:42
15.	"Cross-Eyed Mary"	3:45
16.	"Aqualung"	9:56
17.	"Instrumental improvisation"	3:34
18.	"Wind-Up"	4:54
19.	"Back Door Angels / Guitar improvisation /Wind Up (reprise)"	7:18
20.	"Locomotive Breath"	6:20
21.	"Land of Hope and Glory / Improvisation / Back Door Angels (reprise)"	4:02
22.	"Beethoven's Ninth (with original audio)"	3:20
23.	"The Whistler (promo footage) (mono)"	3:37
Total length:		5:20:49

== Personnel ==
Jethro Tull

- Ian Anderson – lead vocals, flute, acoustic guitar, mandolin, cymbals, whistles; all instruments (on track 2).
- Martin Barre – electric guitar, lute
- John Glascock – bass guitar, backing vocals
- John Evan – piano, organ, synthesisers
- Dee Palmer – piano, portative pipe organ, synthesisers
- Barriemore Barlow – drums, percussion, marimba, glockenspiel, bells, nakers, tabor

Additional personnel

- Robin Black – sound engineering
- Thing Moss and Trevor White – assistant engineers
- Keith Howard – wood-cutter
- Jay L. Lee – front cover painting
- Shirt Sleeve Studio – back cover

== Charts ==
Chart (1977)	Peak position
Australian Albums (Kent Music Report)	13
Austrian Albums (Ö3 Austria)	23
Canada Top Albums/CDs (RPM)	9
Danish Albums (Tracklisten	8
Dutch Albums (Album Top 100)	20
German Albums (Offizielle Top 100)	10
Italian Albums (Musica e Dischi)	21
Norwegian Albums (VG-lista)	8
Swedish Albums (Sverigetopplistan)	22
UK Albums (Official Charts)	13
US Billboard 200	8

Chart (2017)	Peak position
Belgian Albums (Ultratop Wallonia)	86
Italian Albums (FIMI)	35
Scottish Albums (Official Charts)	13
Spanish Albums (Promusicae)	34
Swiss Albums (Schweizer Hitparade)	45
UK Rock & Metal Albums (Official Charts)	4

== Certifications ==
Region	Certification	Certified units/sales
Canada (Music Canada)	Gold	50,000^{^}
United Kingdom (BPI) 2003 release	Silver	60,000^{*}
United States (RIAA)	Gold	500,000^{^}
^{*} Sales figures based on certification alone.^{^} Shipments figures based on certification alone.
