= Too Old to Rock 'n' Roll: Too Young to Die! =

1976 album by Jethro Tull

Studio album by Jethro Tull
- Released: 23 April 1976
- Recorded: 19 November 1975 – 27 January 1976
- Studios: Radio Monte Carlo by the Maison Rouge Mobile Studio, except tracks 8 and 10, recorded at Morgan Studios, in Brussels
- Genres: Progressive rock; folk rock; hard rock; blues rock
- Length: 42:26
- Label: Chrysalis
- Producer: Ian Anderson

Jethro Tull chronology
M.U. – The Best of Jethro Tull (1976)	Too Old to Rock 'n' Roll: Too Young to Die! (1976)	Songs from the Wood (1977)

Singles from Too Old to Rock 'n' Roll: Too Young to Die!
- 1. "Too Old to Rock 'n' Roll: Too Young to Die" Released: 19 March 1976

Too Old to Rock 'n' Roll: Too Young to Die! is the ninth studio album released by British band Jethro Tull, recorded between November 1975 and January 1976 and released in April 1976. It is the first album to include bassist John Glascock who also contributed backing vocals. Too Old to Rock 'n' Roll: Too Young to Die! is a concept album, which follows the story of Ray Lomas, an aging rocker who finds fame with the changes of musical trends. It was Jethro Tull's only album of the 1970s not to achieve Gold certification.

== Overview ==
=== Recording ===
Like their previous album, Minstrel in the Gallery, the band recorded the album in the Maison Rouge Mobile Studio. They recorded "Too Old to Rock 'n' Roll: Too Young to Die" and "The Chequered Flag (Dead or Alive)" along with the outtakes "Salamander's Rag Time", "Commercial Traveller" and "Advertising Man (Unfinished backing track)" on 19 and 20 November 1975, "Big Dipper" on 3 January 1976, "Pied Piper" and "Quizz Kid" on 4 and 5 January, "Taxi Grab", "Pied Piper", "Crazed Institution" and "Old Rocker (Quizz Kid intro)" on 8 January, "From a Dead Beat to an Old Greaser", "Salamander" and "Pied Piper" along with the outtake "A Small Cigar (acoustic version)" on 12 January, and finally "Bad-Eyed and Loveless" along with the outtake "A Small Cigar (orchestral version)" on 27 January 1976.

=== Background ===
Anderson explained the concept came from the turmoil of the rise of the punk movement, and was not meant to be autobiographical of him as an aging songwriter, although "some members of the press took the album as our attempt to 'get with' the punks". Anderson also stated that the basis of the concept is "to point out that this business [music, fashion] is cyclic, and that if you stick around long enough, you do come into fashion again."

=== Concept ===
Originally intended to be a rock musical, the story would follow an aging and retired rock star named Ray Lomas - winning money in a 'Quizz' show, trying to commit suicide and waking up years later to find out that the grease fashion has returned. Although much of the album concept is only explained in the cartoons printed in the sleeves, there are changes in the plot or in details between the cartoons and the music.

A clip of the title track was released in the Slipstream video, which returned to much of the original album's concept.

== Critical reception ==
Professional ratings
Review scores
Source	Rating
AllMusic	3/5 stars
The Encyclopedia of Popular Music	3/5 stars
Melody Maker	(mixed)
Rolling Stone	(mixed)
SputnikMusic	3/5 stars

Rolling Stone complained about the "muddled story" of the album, saying that "Ian Anderson should stick to music, because he most definitely is not a storyteller." Nevertheless, the same review praised Anderson's skill at musical composition, and the guitar solos of Martin Barre.

Chris Welch, writing for Melody Maker, gave a mixed review, saying that he "long(ed) for the beat of Barriemore Barlow to break free, or the guitar of Martin Barre to swoop", at the same time he praised Anderson's poetics.

AllMusic's review called the album "one of the minor efforts in the [Jethro Tull] catalogue".

== Releases ==
Too Old to Rock 'n' Roll: Too Young to Die! was remastered in 2002 and the CD version contains two bonus tracks that were cut from the original LP, "Small Cigar" and "Strip Cartoon".

The album has been released in a box set called Too Old to Rock 'n' Roll: Too Young to Die! - The TV Special Edition in November 2015. The box set contains previously unreleased tracks and outtakes of songs from the album remixed by Steven Wilson, besides an 80-page booklet telling the story of the recording and the video of the special TV show recorded in 1976 and available officially for the first time.

== Track listing ==
=== 1976 original release ===
All tracks are written by Ian Anderson.

Side one
No.	Title	Length
1.	"Quizz Kid"	5:09
2.	"Crazed Institution"	4:48
3.	"Salamander"	2:51
4.	"Taxi Grab"	3:54
5.	"From a Dead Beat to an Old Greaser"	4:09

Side two
No.	Title	Length
1.	"Bad-Eyed and Loveless"	2:12
2.	"Big Dipper"	3:35
3.	"Too Old to Rock 'n' Roll: Too Young to Die"	5:44
4.	"Pied Piper"	4:32
5.	"The Chequered Flag (Dead or Alive)"	5:32

2002 bonus tracks
No.	Title	Length
11.	"A Small Cigar"	3:39
12.	"Strip Cartoon"	3:19

- "A Small Cigar" originally appeared on the 1993 album Nightcap.
- "Strip Cartoon" was first released as the b-side of the 1977 single "The Whistler" (from the Songs from the Wood album); it made its LP & CD debut on the 1988 box set 20 Years of Jethro Tull.

=== 2015 40th Anniversary TV special edition ===
CD 1: Steven Wilson remix of the re-recorded album for TV special, five original album tracks and an outtake
No.	Title	Length
1.	"Prelude"
2.	"Quiz Kid"
3.	"Crazed Institution"
4.	"Salamander"
5.	"Taxi Grab"
6.	"From a Dead Beat to an Old Greaser"
7.	"Bad-Eyed and Loveless"
8.	"Big Dipper"
9.	"Too Old to Rock 'n' Roll: Too Young to Die!"
10.	"Pied Piper"
11.	"The Chequered Flag (Dead or Alive)"
12.	"From a Dead Beat to an Old Greaser" (Original album track)
13.	"Bad-Eyed and Loveless" (Original album track)
14.	"Big Dipper" (Original album track)
15.	"Too Old to Rock 'n' Roll: Too Young to Die!" (Original album track)
16.	"The Chequered Flag (Dead Or Alive)" (Original album track)
17.	"Quiz Kid (Version 1)" (Monte Carlo out-take)

CD 2: Steven Wilson remix of associated recordings and flat transfer of the original album
No.	Title	Length
1.	"Salamander's Rag Time"
2.	"Commercial Traveller"
3.	"Salamander (Instrumental)"
4.	"A Small Cigar (Acoustic Version)"
5.	"Strip Cartoon"
6.	"One Brown Mouse (Early Version)" (Original master mix)
7.	"A Small Cigar (Orchestrated Version)" (Original rough mix)
8.	"Too Old to Rock 'n' Roll: Too Young to Die! (Demo)"
9.	"Prelude" (Original album flat transfer)
10.	"Quiz Kid" (Original album flat transfer)
11.	"Crazed Institution" (Original album flat transfer)
12.	"Salamander" (Original album flat transfer)
13.	"Taxi Grab" (Original album flat transfer)
14.	"From a Dead Beat to an Old Greaser" (Original album flat transfer)
15.	"Bad-Eyed and Loveless" (Original album flat transfer)
16.	"Big Dipper" (Original album flat transfer)
17.	"Too Old to Rock 'n' Roll: Too Young to Die!" (Original album flat transfer)
18.	"Pied Piper" (Original album flat transfer)
19.	"The Chequered Flag (Dead or Alive)" (Original album flat transfer)

DVD 1:
No.	Title	Length
1.	"Too Old to Rock 'n' Roll: Too Young to Die?" (TV film with DTS and Dolby Digital 5.1 surround sound and Dolby Digital Stereo)
2.	"TV audio (stereo)" (in 96/24 stereo PCM)
3.	"Five original LP tracks (5.1 surround and stereo)" (with DTS and Dolby Digital 5.1 surround sound and 96/24 stereo PCM)

DVD 2: Associated recordings and others
No.	Title	Length
1.	"Salamander's Rag Time" (with DTS and Dolby Digital 5.1 surround sound and 96/24 stereo PCM)
2.	"Commercial Traveller" (with DTS and Dolby Digital 5.1 surround sound and 96/24 stereo PCM)
3.	"A Small Cigar (Acoustic Version)" (with DTS and Dolby Digital 5.1 surround sound and 96/24 stereo PCM)
4.	"Strip Cartoon" (with DTS and Dolby Digital 5.1 surround sound and 96/24 stereo PCM)
5.	"Quiz Kid (Version 1)" (in 96/24 stereo PCM)
6.	"One Brown Mouse (early version) (Original Master Mix)" (in 96/24 stereo PCM)
7.	"Salamander (Instrumental)" (in 96/24 stereo PCM)
8.	"Strip Cartoon (Original Master Mix)" (in 96/24 stereo PCM)
9.	"A Small Cigar (Orchestrated Version) (Original Rough Mix)" (in 96/24 stereo PCM)
10.	"Too Old to Rock 'n' Roll: Too Young to Die! (Demo)" (in 96/24 stereo PCM)
11.	"A flat transfer of the original 1976 Quad LP Production Master with DTS 4.0 and Dolby Digital AC3 4.0 surround sound."
12.	"A flat transfer of the original 1976 LP master at 96/24 stereo PCM."

== Personnel ==
Jethro Tull

- Ian Anderson – lead vocals, acoustic guitar, flute, harmonica, additional electric guitar and percussion
- Martin Barre – electric guitar
- John Evan – piano, keyboards
- John Glascock – backing vocals, bass guitar
- Barriemore Barlow – drums, percussion

Additional musicians

- Dee Palmer – saxophone (on track 5), Vako Orchestron, piano (on track 11)
- Maddy Prior – backing vocals (on track 8)
- Angela Allen – backing vocals (on tracks 2 & 7)

Orchestrations by Dee Palmer. Orchestra conducted by Dee Palmer.

Additional personnel

- Robin Black – sound engineer
- Michael Farrell – cover design, illustrations
- David Gibbons – design, illustrations

== Charts ==
Chart (1976)	Peak position
Australian Albums (Kent Music Report)	25
Austrian Albums (Ö3 Austria)	10
Canada Top Albums/CDs (RPM)	46
Danish Albums (Tracklisten	10
Finnish Albums (The Official Finnish Charts)	26
German Albums (Offizielle Top 100)	26
New Zealand Albums (RMNZ)	28
Norwegian Albums (VG-lista)	10
Swedish Albums (Sverigetopplistan)	27
UK Albums (Official Charts)	25
US Billboard 200	14

Chart (2015)	Peak position
UK Rock & Metal Albums (Official Charts)	13
