= Heavy Horses =

1978 studio album by Jethro Tull

Studio album by Jethro Tull
- Released: 10 April 1978
- Recorded: May 1977 – January 1978
- Studios: Maison Rouge Studio, Fulham, London
- Genres: Folk rock; progressive rock; hard rock
- Length: 42:25 (original release); 43:11 (2018 remix)
- Label: Chrysalis
- Producer: Ian Anderson

Jethro Tull chronology
Repeat – The Best of Jethro Tull – Vol II (1977)	Heavy Horses (1978)	Bursting Out (1978)

Singles from Heavy Horses
- 1. "Moths" Released: 31 March 1978

Heavy Horses is the eleventh studio album by British progressive rock band Jethro Tull, released on 10 April 1978.

The album is often considered the second in a trio of folk rock albums released by the band at the end of the 1970s, alongside Songs from the Wood (1977) and Stormwatch (1979). In contrast to the British folklore-inspired lyrical content found on Songs from the Wood, Heavy Horses adopts a more realist and earthly perspective of country living; further, the album (and its title track) are dedicated to the "indigenous working ponies and horses of Great Britain". Musically, the album sees the band continuing the combination of folk and progressive rock found on Songs from the Wood, although with an overall darker and more sober sound fitting the changed lyrical content.

== Recording ==
Heavy Horses was the first album recorded by Jethro Tull at the newly constructed Maison Rouge studio in Fulham, London, a custom built recording studio which was funded and owned by Ian Anderson. Much of the album was recorded at night, as Anderson felt that daytime hours at the studio needed to be left open for potential business clients. Keyboardist Dee Palmer recalled her diary entries at the time of recording as saying that "I'd start at 7pm and go home at 7am!" Heavy Horses was the first album on which Anderson began to experience vocal issues, the beginning of an affliction which would become more serious in the 1980s and later develop into chronic obstructive pulmonary disease. Anderson's vocals sound more nasal and gruff on some of the album's tracks as a result, particularly on the title track.

As with the band's previous album Songs from the Wood, other members of the band beyond just Anderson were involved in writing music for the album, with guitarist Martin Barre writing portions of the title track and "No Lullaby" and Palmer writing string arrangements for most of the album as well as the instrumental bridge of "...And the Mouse Police Never Sleeps". Darryl Way of Curved Air guests on the album, playing violin on the title track and "Acres Wild".

Several songs were recorded but then abandoned or otherwise cut from the album during the recording sessions, including the B-side "Beltane", a completely finished song titled "Everything in Our Lives" and an early acoustic version of "Jack-a-Lynn", a song which would later be re-recorded during sessions for the band's 1982 album The Broadsword and the Beast. Many of the unreleased songs recorded during the album's sessions were later released on the 20 Years of Jethro Tull anniversary compilation in 1988 and the 40th anniversary "New Shoes" edition of the album in 2018. Upon remixing of the album for the 40th anniversary edition, it was discovered that the original masters of "Moths" and "Rover" were slightly sharp, likely as a result of a faulty tape machine. The remixed versions of the tracks included on the re-release of the album were slightly pitched down to correct this.

== Musical style and themes ==
While continuing the folk rock style of Songs From the Wood, Heavy Horses sees a tonal shift into more earthly and realist themes of country living, compared with the fantasy and mythology of the previous album. Anderson was again inspired by daily life at his recently purchased country estate in Buckinghamshire, saying that "I was living in the same house in the same place, and getting a bit more involved in farming and other rural stuff... so the horse-hoeing husbandry of the original Jethro Tull era was in the back of my mind." Several of the album's songs were directly inspired by Anderson's personal life at the estate: "...And the Mouse Police Never Sleeps" was partially inspired by his cat Mistletoe, "No Lullaby" was written as an "anti-lullaby" for his son and "Rover" was partially inspired by his dog Lupus. Other songs on the album such as "Weathercock" and the title track paint a cold and practical picture of country living, with the latter track described by Anderson as "a lament for the passing as working animals of those magnificent beasts, the heavy farm horses." Other track's lyrics were inspired by literature, such as "One Brown Mouse" inspired by the Robert Burns poem "To a Mouse" and "Moths" inspired by the John le Carré novel The Naïve and Sentimental Lover.

Anderson stated that the recording of the album came at a time when other artists were moving towards the new trends in music, and the band decided they did not want "to appear as if we were trying to slip into the post-punk coattails that were worn by The Stranglers or The Police."

== Reception ==
Professional ratings
Review scores
Source	Rating
AllMusic	4/5 stars
The Encyclopedia of Popular Music	3/5 stars
Melody Maker	(unfavourable)

Rolling Stone's contemporary review was positive, calling the instrumental arrangements lavish and stating that Heavy Horses and the folk genre, as a follow-up to Songs from the Wood, suited Jethro Tull perfectly. The Globe and Mail thought that the band was coasting, but praised "Anderson's enigmatic writing style and his one-of-a-kind voice".

AllMusic calls Heavy Horses one of the prettiest records of the band, praising both Martin Barre's and John Glascock's playing as Robin Black engineering and the special participation of Curved Air violinist Darryl Way.

== Track listing ==
=== 1978 original release ===
All tracks are written by Ian Anderson with additional material by Martin Barre and Dee Palmer.

Side one
No.	Title	Length
1.	"...And the Mouse Police Never Sleeps"	3:11
2.	"Acres Wild"	3:22
3.	"No Lullaby"	7:55
4.	"Moths"	3:24
5.	"Journeyman"	3:55

Side two
No.	Title	Length
6.	"Rover"	4:17
7.	"One Brown Mouse"	3:21
8.	"Heavy Horses"	8:58
9.	"Weathercock"	4:02
Total length:		42:25

2003 bonus tracks
No.	Title	Length
10.	"Living in These Hard Times"	3:10
11.	"Broadford Bazaar"	3:38

== 2018 40th Anniversary New Shoes Deluxe Edition ==
On 2 March 2018 Jethro Tull released a five-disc ‘bookset’ version of Heavy Horses with a 96-page booklet that includes a track-by-track annotation of the album and its associated recordings by Ian Anderson. It is similar to the band's other 40th Anniversary reissues, with the first disc containing another Steven Wilson stereo remix followed by ‘associated recordings’ including seven previously unreleased tracks. The second and third discs contain 22 previously unreleased live tracks, recorded at the Festhalle in Berne Switzerland during the European leg of their 1978 Heavy Horses Tour, from 28 May 1978, remixed to stereo by Jakko Jakszyk. The set also includes DVDs.

CD 1: Steven Wilson stereo remix of the album and associated recordings
No.	Title	Length
1.	"...And the Mouse Police Never Sleeps"
2.	"Acres Wild"
3.	"No Lullaby"
4.	"Moths"
5.	"Journeyman"
6.	"Rover"
7.	"One Brown Mouse"
8.	"Heavy Horses"
9.	"Weathercock"
10.	"Living in These Hard Times (version 2, previously unreleased)"
11.	"Everything in Our Lives (previously unreleased)"
12.	"Jack A Lynn (early version, previously unreleased)"
13.	"Quatrain (studio version, previously unreleased)"
14.	"Horse-Hoeing Husbandry (previously unreleased)"
15.	"Beltane"
16.	"Botanic Man (previously unreleased)"
17.	"Living in These Hard Times (version 1)"
18.	"Botanic Man Theme (previously unreleased)"

CD 2: Live in Concert: Berne, Switzerland, May 1978, Jakko Jakszyk stereo mix
No.	Title	Length
1.	"Opening Music (Quartet)"
2.	"Intro by Claude Nobs"
3.	"No Lullaby"
4.	"Sweet Dream"
5.	"Skating Away on the Thin Ice of the New Day"
6.	"Jack-in-the-Green"
7.	"One Brown Mouse"
8.	"Heavy Horses"
9.	"A New Day Yesterday"
10.	"Flute Solo Improvisation/God Rest Ye Gentlemen/Bourée"
11.	"Living in the Past / A New Day Yesterday (reprise)"
12.	"Songs from the Wood"

CD 3: Live in Concert: Berne, Switzerland, May 1978, Jakko Jakszyk stereo mix
No.	Title	Length
1.	"Thick as a Brick"
2.	"Hunting Girl"
3.	"Too Old to Rock 'n' Roll: Too Young to Die"
4.	"Conundrum"
5.	"Minstrel in the Gallery"
6.	"Cross-Eyed Mary"
7.	"Quatrain"
8.	"Aqualung"
9.	"Locomotive Breath"
10.	"Dambusters March/Aqualung (Reprise)"

DVD 1: Steven Wilson 5.1 surround and stereo mixes and flat transfer of the original stereo and quadraphonic mixes of the album and selected associated recordings
No.	Title	Length
1.	"...And the Mouse Police Never Sleeps (Steven Wilson DD/DTS 5.1 Surround Remix)"
2.	"Acres Wild (Steven Wilson DD/DTS 5.1 Surround Remix)"
3.	"No Lullaby (Steven Wilson DD/DTS 5.1 Surround Remix)"
4.	"Moths (Steven Wilson DD/DTS 5.1 Surround Remix)"
5.	"Journeyman (Steven Wilson DD/DTS 5.1 Surround Remix)"
6.	"Rover (Steven Wilson DD/DTS 5.1 Surround Remix)"
7.	"One Brown Mouse (Steven Wilson DD/DTS 5.1 Surround Remix)"
8.	"Heavy Horses (Steven Wilson DD/DTS 5.1 Surround Remix)"
9.	"Weathercock (Steven Wilson DD/DTS 5.1 Surround Remix)"
10.	"Living in These Hard Times (version 2, previously unreleased) (Steven Wilson DD/DTS 5.1 Surround Remix)"
11.	"Everything in Our Lives (previously unreleased) (Steven Wilson DD/DTS 5.1 Surround Remix)"
12.	"Jack A Lynn (early version, previously unreleased) (Steven Wilson DD/DTS 5.1 Surround Remix)"
13.	"Horse-Hoeing Husbandry (previously unreleased) (Steven Wilson DD/DTS 5.1 Surround Remix)"
14.	"Beltane (Steven Wilson DD/DTS 5.1 Surround Remix)"
15.	"Botanic Man (previously unreleased) (Steven Wilson DD/DTS 5.1 Surround Remix)"
16.	"Living in These Hard Times (version 1) (Steven Wilson DD/DTS 5.1 Surround Remix)"
17.	"Botanic Man Theme (previously unreleased) (Steven Wilson DD/DTS 5.1 Surround Remix)"
18.	"A Town in England (Steven Wilson DD/DTS 5.1 Surround Remix)"
19.	"...And the Mouse Police Never Sleeps (Steven Wilson Remix in 96/24 PCM Stereo)"
20.	"Acres Wild (Steven Wilson Remix in 96/24 PCM Stereo)"
21.	"No Lullaby (Steven Wilson Remix in 96/24 PCM Stereo)"
22.	"Moths (Cap in Hand) (Steven Wilson Remix in 96/24 PCM Stereo)"
23.	"Journeyman (Steven Wilson Remix in 96/24 PCM Stereo)"
24.	"Rover (Steven Wilson Remix in 96/24 PCM Stereo)"
25.	"One Brown Mouse (Steven Wilson Remix in 96/24 PCM Stereo)"
26.	"Heavy Horses (Steven Wilson Remix in 96/24 PCM Stereo)"
27.	"Weathercock (unedited master) (Steven Wilson Remix in 96/24 PCM Stereo)"
28.	"Living in These Hard Times (version 2, previously unreleased) (Steven Wilson Remix in 96/24 PCM Stereo)"
29.	"Everything in Our Lives (previously unreleased) (Steven Wilson Remix in 96/24 PCM Stereo)"
30.	"Jack A Lynn (early version, previously unreleased) (Steven Wilson Remix in 96/24 PCM Stereo)"
31.	"Quatrain (studio version, previously unreleased) (Steven Wilson Remix in 96/24 PCM Stereo)"
32.	"Horse-Hoeing Husbandry (previously unreleased) (Steven Wilson Remix in 96/24 PCM Stereo)"
33.	"Beltane (Steven Wilson Remix in 96/24 PCM Stereo)"
34.	"Botanic Man (previously Unreleased) (Steven Wilson Remix in 96/24 PCM Stereo)"
35.	"Living in These Hard Times (version 1) (Steven Wilson Remix in 96/24 PCM Stereo)"
36.	"Botanic Man Theme (previously unreleased) (Steven Wilson Remix in 96/24 PCM Stereo)"
37.	"A Town in England (Steven Wilson Remix in 96/24 PCM Stereo)"
38.	"...And the Mouse Police Never Sleeps (96/24 PCM Flat Transfer – Original Stereo Master)"
39.	"Acres Wild (96/24 PCM Flat Transfer – Original Stereo Master)"
40.	"No Lullaby (96/24 PCM Flat Transfer – Original Stereo Master)"
41.	"Moths (96/24 PCM Flat Transfer – Original Stereo Master)"
42.	"Journeyman (96/24 PCM Flat Transfer – Original Stereo Master)"
43.	"Rover (96/24 PCM Flat Transfer – Original Stereo Master)"
44.	"One Brown Mouse (96/24 PCM Flat Transfer – Original Stereo Master)"
45.	"Heavy Horses (96/24 PCM Flat Transfer – Original Stereo Master)"
46.	"Weathercock (96/24 PCM Flat Transfer – Original Stereo Master)"
47.	"Rover (No Strings Version) (Flat Transfer)"
48.	"Living in These Hard Times (Version 2) (Flat Transfer)"
49.	"Beltane (Flat Transfer)"

DVD 2: recorded live to 24 track at The Festhalle, Berne, Switzerland by The Maison Rouge Mobile mixed to 5.1 DTS & DD surround sound and 48/24 LPCM stereo (tracks 1–22) and 96/24 stereo (tracks 23–44) by Jakko Jakszyk.
No.	Title	Length
1.	"Opening Music (Quartet)"
2.	"Introduction by Claude Nobs"
3.	"No Lullaby"
4.	"Sweet Dream"
5.	"Skating Away on the Thin Ice of the New Day"
6.	"Jack-in-the-Green"
7.	"One Brown Mouse"
8.	"Heavy Horses"
9.	"A New Day Yesterday"
10.	"Flute Solo Improvisation / God Rest Ye Gentlemen/Bourée"
11.	"Living in the Past / A New Day Yesterday (reprise)"
12.	"Songs from the Wood"
13.	"Thick as a Brick"
14.	"Hunting Girl"
15.	"Too Old to Rock 'n' Roll, Too Young to Die"
16.	"Conundrum"
17.	"Minstrel in the Gallery"
18.	"Cross-Eyed Mary"
19.	"Quatrain"
20.	"Aqualung"
21.	"Locomotive Breath"
22.	"The Dambuster's March/Aqualung (Reprise)"
45.	"Heavy Horses (video)"
46.	"Moths (Video)"
47.	"Bursting Out (TV Advertisement) (Video)"
48.	"Bursting Out and Madison Square Garden show (TV Advertisement) (Video)"

== Personnel ==
Jethro Tull

- Ian Anderson – lead vocals, flute, acoustic guitar, additional electric guitar, mandolin
- Martin Barre – electric guitar
- John Evan – piano, organ
- Barriemore Barlow – drums, percussion
- John Glascock – backing vocals, bass guitar
- Dee Palmer – keyboards, portative pipe organ, orchestral arrangements

Additional personnel

- Darryl Way – violin (on "Acres Wild" and "Heavy Horses")
- Shona Anderson – photography
- Robin Black – sound engineer
- James Cotier – photography

== Charts ==
Chart (1978)	Peak position
Australian Albums (Kent Music Report)	17
Austrian Albums (Ö3 Austria)	18
Canada Top Albums/CDs (RPM)	14
French Albums (SNEP)	20
German Albums (Offizielle Top 100)	4
New Zealand Albums (RMNZ)	34
Norwegian Albums (VG-lista)	13
Swedish Albums (Sverigetopplistan)	27
UK Albums (Official Charts)	20
US Billboard 200	19

Chart (2018)	Peak position
Belgian Albums (Ultratop Flanders)	181
Dutch Albums (Album Top 100)	85
Scottish Albums (Official Charts)	13
UK Rock & Metal Albums (Official Charts)	3

== Certifications ==
Region	Certification	Certified units/sales
Canada (Music Canada)	Gold	50,000^{^}
United Kingdom (BPI)	Silver	60,000^{^}
United States (RIAA)	Gold	500,000^{^}
^{^} Shipments figures based on certification alone.
