= Doane Perry =

American musician, composer and author (born 1954)

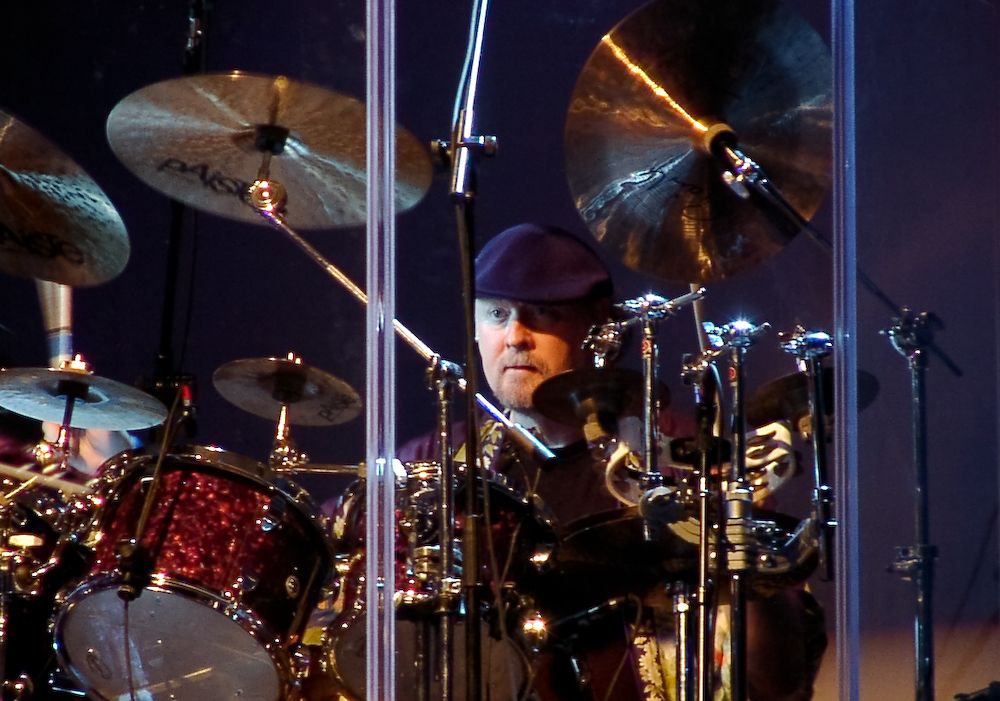
- Perry performing with Jethro Tull in 2005

Background information
- Born: Doane Ethredge Perry; June 16, 1954 (age 72); Mount Kisco, New York, U.S.
- Genres: Progressive rock; hard rock; heavy metal; pop; R&B; jazz; classical
- Occupations: Musician; songwriter; producer
- Instruments: Drums; percussion
- Years active: 1968–present
- Formerly of: Dragon; Jethro Tull
- Website: DoanePerry.com

Doane Ethredge Perry (born June 16, 1954) is an American musician, composer and author. From 1984 to 2011 he was drummer and percussionist with the band Jethro Tull and has also appeared on hundreds of recordings spanning multiple genres on records, film and television.

== Early life ==
From New York City, Perry began playing the piano at age seven and then took up drums at eleven. After hearing The Beatles, he decided to take up drums, because of what he describes as "the possibility, however unlikely that might have been, of young girls chasing me down the street, if I took up the drums." By the time he was 14, he was working with his own band on weekends, and continued to do so until he graduated high school at the age of 17.

He attended Browning, St. Bernard's and Collegiate Schools in New York City. Later he briefly attended New York University and extension programs at The New School, Rutgers, and Juilliard, followed by extensive private musical study in jazz and orchestral percussion.

== Musical career ==
By the time Perry was 18, he turned professional while simultaneously attempting to attend college. This led to a serious conflict, finally resolved, when he opted to pursue music full-time. He began gaining a broader musical background in a wide variety of styles, which included genres such as rock, pop, jazz, fusion, R&B, classical, world and folk. He has appeared on over 100 successful records within his musical career in various musical capacities as a performer, composer and producer, that have achieved gold to multi-platinum status.

He was a member of the faculty of the Musician's Institute in Hollywood, Ca. from 1988 to 1996.

He continues to perform solo clinics at Drum Festivals and Music Colleges around the world.

In 1992, he released a critically acclaimed instructional video entitled Creative Listening, still widely used in the curriculum of music schools in the US and abroad.

=== Jethro Tull ===
In 1984 Perry joined Grammy Award-winning band Jethro Tull as drummer and percussionist to replace Gerry Conway. He is the second member of Jethro Tull to have been born in the United States; (the first was fellow drummer Mark Craney). He continued to record and tour until the band's 2011 hiatus, and was its third longest standing member of 28 years. Perry played on numerous Jethro Tull albums and DVDs from 1984 - 2011.

=== Equipment ===
Doane Perry has used a wide variety of equipment over the years. He uses different drum kits depending on several factors, such as whether he is performing live or recording in the studio. On later Tull tours and records he used Premier's Artist Series maple drums, but would occasionally use birch Genistas or maple Signia Series drums, Paiste cymbals, DW Pedals & Hardware, Pro Mark Drumsticks, Remo Drum Heads, Rhythm Tech Percussion, LP Percussion.

== Personal life ==
In 1990, he married actress Heather Woodruff. They currently reside in Woodland Hills, California.

== Selected discography ==
=== With Maxus ===
- Maxus (1981)

=== With Lou Reed ===
- The Blue Mask (1982)

=== With Dragon ===
- Dreams of Ordinary Men (1986)

=== With Jethro Tull ===
- Crest of a Knave (1987)
- Rock Island (1989)
- Catfish Rising (1991)
- Roots to Branches (1995)
- J-Tull Dot Com (1999)
- The Jethro Tull Christmas Album (2003)

=== With Magellan ===
- Impending Ascension (1993)

=== With Ian Anderson ===
- Divinities: Twelve Dances with God (1995)
- Rupi's Dance (2003)

=== With Martin Barre ===
- The Meeting (1998)
- Martin Barre (2012)

=== With Michelle Young ===
- Marked for Madness (2001)

=== With Dave Pegg ===
- A Box of Pegg's (2007)
