= Repeat – The Best of Jethro Tull – Vol II =

Greatest hits album by Jethro Tull
- Released: 9 September 1977
- Recorded: 1969–1975
- Genre: Progressive rock
- Length: 39:26
- Label: Chrysalis
- Producer: Ian Anderson

Jethro Tull chronology
Songs from the Wood (1977)	Repeat – The Best of Jethro Tull – Vol II (1977)	Heavy Horses (1978)

Professional ratings
Review scores
Source	Rating
AllMusic	4/5 stars
The Encyclopedia of Popular Music	3/5 stars

Repeat – The Best of Jethro Tull – Vol II is a 1977 greatest hits album from Jethro Tull, featuring one track which, up to the time of this album's release, had not been issued. The album's first volume was M.U. – The Best of Jethro Tull.

== Track listing ==
All tracks are written by Ian Anderson, except where noted.

No.	Title	Writer(s)	Length
1.	"Minstrel in the Gallery" (Edited version)		4:17
2.	"Cross-Eyed Mary"		4:11
3.	"A New Day Yesterday"		4:10
4.	"Bourée" (Instrumental)	Johann Sebastian Bach, arr. by Anderson	3:46
5.	"Thick as a Brick" (Edit #4)		3:27
6.	"War Child"		4:37
7.	"A Passion Play" (Edit #9)		3:33
8.	"To Cry You a Song"		6:14
9.	"Too Old to Rock 'n' Roll: Too Young to Die"		5:42
10.	"Glory Row" (Previously unreleased)		3:33

== Notes ==
- "Thick as a Brick (Edit #4)" consists of the section of Part I beginning with "I've come down from the upper class..." on the original album (1972).
- "A Passion Play (Edit #9)" consists of the segment identified as "Flight from Lucifer" on a March 1998 Mobile Fidelity Sound Lab gold CD issue of 1973's A Passion Play - this begins at 16:58 in Part II of the current CD issue.
- "Glory Row" is now available as a bonus track on the remastered version of War Child (1974).
- "Glory Row" had been previously made available in the Spanish LP edition of Aqualung (1971) (which was not released until 1975) in place of "Locomotive Breath", which was already available in Living in the Past (1972).

== Personnel ==
- Ian Anderson – vocals, flute, mandolin, acoustic guitar, guitar, soprano & alto saxophone, voices, producer
- Martin Barre – acoustic guitar, electric guitar
- John Evan – accordion, piano, synthesizer, piano-accordion, Hammond organ, keyboards on 1, 2, 5–10
- Glenn Cornick – bass guitar on tracks 3, 4, 8
- Jeffrey Hammond – bass guitar on tracks 1, 2, 5–7, 10
- John Glascock – bass guitar; vocals on track 9
- Clive Bunker – drums, percussion on tracks 2–4, 8
- Barriemore Barlow – drums, percussion on tracks 1, 5–7, 9, 10
- Dee Palmer – arranger, saxophone, synthesizer, keyboards, conductor
- Maddy Prior – backing vocals on 9

=== Recording personnel ===
- Terry Ellis – producer
- John Burns – engineer
- Andy Johns – engineer
- Robin Black – engineer
- Frank Duarte – illustrations

== Charts ==
Chart (1977)	Peak position
Australian Albums (Kent Music Report)	92
US Billboard 200	94

== Notes ==
- Also known as Repeat: The Best of Jethro Tull, Vol. 2 or Repeat: The Best of Jethro Tull - Vol II
