= The Best of Jethro Tull – The Anniversary Collection =

The Best of Jethro Tull - The Anniversary Collection

Greatest hits album by Jethro Tull
- Released: 24 May 1993
- Recorded: 1968–1991
- Genre: Progressive rock; hard rock
- Length: 154:28
- Label: Chrysalis
- Producer: Ian Anderson (tracks 1.4-1.6, 1.8, 1.11-1.19, 2.1-2.9, 2.12-2.17) Jethro Tull (tracks: 1.1-1.3, 1.7, 1.9, 1.10); Paul Samwell-Smith (tracks: 2.10, 2.11); Robin Black (tracks: 2.7, 2.8) Terry Ellis (music producer) (tracks: 1.1-1.7, 1.9-1.14)

Jethro Tull chronology
25th Anniversary Box Set (1993)	The Best of Jethro Tull - The Anniversary Collection (1993)	Nightcap (1993)

Alternative and DVD cover
- USA and DVD release

Professional ratings
Review scores
Source	Rating
The Encyclopedia of Popular Music	3/5 stars

The Best of Jethro Tull – The Anniversary Collection is a greatest hits album by Jethro Tull, released in 1993. It includes some of the band's hits from 1968 to 1991.

== Track listing ==
=== Disc one ===
1. "A Song for Jeffrey" – 3:19
2. "Beggar's Farm" – 4:19
3. "A Christmas Song" – 3:07
4. "A New Day Yesterday" – 4:09
5. "Bourée" (Instrumental) – 3:46
6. "Nothing Is Easy" – 4:23
7. "Living in the Past" – 3:21
8. "To Cry You a Song" – 6:15
9. "Teacher" – 4:01
10. "Sweet Dream" – 4:02
11. "Cross-Eyed Mary" – 4:09
12. "Mother Goose" – 3:53
13. "Aqualung" – 6:36
14. "Locomotive Breath" – 4:25
15. "Life Is a Long Song" – 3:19
16. "Thick as a Brick" (extract) – 3:02
17. "A Passion Play" (extract) – 3:47 ("Magus Perdé")
18. "Skating Away on the Thin Ice of the New Day" – 3:52
19. "Bungle in the Jungle" – 3:39

=== Disc two ===
1. "Minstrel in the Gallery" (Edited version) – 6:10
2. "Too Old to Rock 'n' Roll: Too Young to Die" – 5:40
3. "Songs from the Wood" – 4:54
4. "Jack-in-the-Green" – 2:30
5. "The Whistler" – 3:32
6. "Heavy Horses" – 8:57
7. "Dun Ringill" – 2:41
8. "Fylingdale Flyer" – 4:32
9. "Jack-a-Lynn" – 4:42
10. "Pussy Willow" – 3:53
11. "Broadsword" – 4:59
12. "Under Wraps II" – 2:14
13. "Steel Monkey" – 3:34
14. "Farm on the Freeway" – 6:28
15. "Jump Start" – 4:53
16. "Kissing Willie" – 3:31
17. "This Is Not Love" – 3:54

== Musicians ==
=== Disc one ===
- Ian Anderson – flute, balalaika, mandolin, Hammond organ, acoustic guitar, vocals (all tracks)
- Mick Abrahams – electric guitar (tracks 1 – 2)
- Clive Bunker – drums, glockenspiel, percussion (tracks 1 – 14)
- Glenn Cornick – bass, Hammond organ (tracks 1 – 10)
- Martin Barre – electric guitar (tracks 4 – 19)
- Jeffrey Hammond-Hammond bass (tracks 11 – 19)
- Barriemore Barlow – drums (tracks 15 – 19)
- David Palmer – orchestral arrangement and conducting (tracks 3, 10 a 17 – 19)

=== Disc two ===
- Ian Anderson – flute, balalaika, Hammond organ, acoustic guitar, vocals (all tracks)
- Jeffrey Hammond-Hammond bass (track 1)
- Martin Barre – electric guitar (tracks 1 – 17)
- Barriemore Barlow – drums (tracks 1 – 7)
- John Glascock bass, vocals (tracks 2 – 7)
- David Palmer – orchestral arrangement and conducting (tracks 1 – 7)
- Dave Pegg – bass, mandolin, vocals (tracks 8 – 17)
- Mark Craney – drums (track 8)
- Gerry Conway – drums, percussion (tracks 9 – 11 and 15)
- Peter-John Vettese – keyboards, piano, synthesizer (tracks 9 – 12)
- Doane Perry – drums (tracks 12, 14 a 16 – 17)
- Maartin Allcock – keyboards (track 16)
- Andrew Giddings – keyboards (track 17)

==== Guest musicians ====
- Lou Toby – string arrangement, conducting (disc 1, track 7)
- Maddy Prior – backing vocals (disc 2, track 2)
- Darryl Way – violin (disc 2, track 6)
- Eddie Jobson – keyboards, electric violin, (disc 2, track 8)

== Charts ==
Chart (1993–1994)	Peak position
Australian Albums (ARIA)	112
