= Hymn 43 =

- Cover of the Japanese 7-inch single

Single by Jethro Tull

from the album Aqualung
- B-side: "Mother Goose"
- Released: June 1971
- Recorded: December 1970 – February 1971
- Genre: Hard rock, progressive rock
- Length: 3:14
- Label: Reprise
- Songwriter: Ian Anderson
- Producers: Ian Anderson, Terry Ellis

Jethro Tull singles chronology
"Inside" (1970)	"Hymn 43" (1971)	"Locomotive Breath" (1971)

"Hymn 43" is a song by British progressive rock group Jethro Tull. It is off their Aqualung album and was released as a single by Reprise Records. The song reached No. 91 on the Billboard Hot 100.

== Background ==
Songwriter Ian Anderson described the song as "a blues for Jesus, about the gory, glory seekers who use his name as an excuse for a lot of unsavoury things. You know, 'Hey Dad, it's not my fault — the missionaries lied.'" Sean Murphy of PopMatters wrote that "For 'Hymn 43' Anderson sets his sights on the US and in quick order sets about decimating the hypocrisy and myth-making of religion and the new religion, entertainment."

According to the sheet music published at Musicnotes.com by Sony/ATV Music Publishing, the song is set in the time signature of common time. It is composed in the key of D major with Anderson's vocal range spanning from G_{4} to Eb_{6}.

Classic Rock History critic Skip Anderson ranked "Hymn 43" as Jethro Tull's 2nd best song, behind only "Thick as a Brick" and ahead of the more popular songs on Aqualung, "Aqualung" and "Locomotive Breath".

== Chart performance ==
Year	Chart	Position
1971	RPM100 Singles (Canada)	86
1971	Billboard Hot 100 (USA)	91

== Personnel ==
Jethro Tull

- Ian Anderson – vocals, flute
- Clive Bunker – drums and percussion
- Martin Barre – electric guitar
- Jeffrey Hammond - bass guitar
- John Evan – piano, organ, mellotron

== Covers ==
- Morse/Portnoy/George released this as their third single off their 2020 album Cov3r to Cov3r on July 10, 2020.
- A version by Alabama Thunderpussy was included on the compilation album, Sucking the 70's.

== In popular culture ==
- The song was released as downloadable content for the video game Rock Band 2.
