= Mother Goose (song) =

Song by Jethro Tull

from the album Aqualung
- Released: 19 March 1971
- Recorded: December 1970 – February 1971
- Studio: Island, London
- Genre: Folk rock; progressive rock
- Length: 3:51
- Label: Reprise (original US); Chrysalis/Capitol (US re-issue)
- Songwriter: Ian Anderson
- Producers: Ian Anderson; Terry Ellis

"Mother Goose" is a song by the British progressive rock band Jethro Tull. It is the fourth track from their album Aqualung which was released in 1971.

== Background ==
"Mother Goose" was written by Jethro Tull frontman Ian Anderson. Anderson, who recalled writing the song in the summer of 1970, singled out the song as one of the earliest written for the band's 1971 album, Aqualung. He also noted the song as being somewhat atypical of his writing style, commenting, "I tend to be more in social realism, in terms of subject matter, but I do stretch to the more whimsical, surreal songs like 'Mother Goose'." Anderson, who has also called the song a "surrealistic pastiche with summery motives", views the song as an expression of visual art:

Music was such a natural extension of the thing that we were principally interested in, which was the visual arts. ... I can go back to the very early songs of Jethro Tull on the Aqualung album; things like "Mother Goose", for example; it's a visual reference. Right now I can see the picture in my head from which those words came.

== Lyrics and styles ==
The lyrics are a pastiche of surreal figures based on images that Ian Anderson wrote with the same abstract ideas as "Cross-Eyed Mary". The song is mostly acoustic, like "Cheap Day Return" or "Slipstream". Rolling Stone magazine has put it as "Elizabethan madrigal" musical style. Anderson would return to the Mother Goose character on Jethro Tull's 1973 album A Passion Play.

== Release ==
"Mother Goose" was first released on the band's 1971 studio album Aqualung.

The song has since appeared on several Jethro Tull compilation albums, including The Best of Jethro Tull - The Anniversary Collection (1993), The Best of Acoustic Jethro Tull (2007), and 50 for 50 (2018). The song also appears in live form on Ian Anderson Plays the Orchestral Jethro Tull (2005) and Aqualung Live (2005).

== Critical reception ==
AllMusic noted how "the fable imagery of 'Mother Goose' ... serve[s] notice of Anderson's willful iconoclasm." In a retrospective review of Aqualing, The Tufts Daily praised the song as "an absolutely mesmerizing track". Louder magazine praised the song for "providing the light relief" on the album, amongst songs like "Locomotive Breath" and the title track. Anderson made a similar point in an interview, noting the combination of the "amusing surreal moments" of acoustic songs like "Mother Goose" and "Up to Me" balanced with the album's more "dramatic" material.

== Personnel ==
- Ian Anderson: flute, acoustic guitar, percussion, vocals, backing vocals
- Martin Barre: acoustic and electric rhythm guitar, percussion
- Jeffrey Hammond: alto recorder, backing vocals (Credited on Aqualung album as Jeffery Hammond-Hammond)
- Clive Bunker: percussion
- John Evan: Mellotron

The Mellotron was replaced by the accordion on the Aqualung Live album played by Andrew Giddings.
