= A Classic Case =

Studio album by London Symphony Orchestra, Jethro Tull
- Released: 15 February 1985
- Recorded: Summer 1984
- Studio: CBS Studios in London
- Genre: Symphonic rock
- Length: 42:55
- Label: RCA Red Seal
- Producer: David Palmer

London Symphony Orchestra, Jethro Tull chronology
Under Wraps (1984)	A Classic Case (1985)	Original Masters (1985)

Professional ratings
Review scores
Source	Rating
AllMusic	3/5 stars

A Classic Case is an album by Jethro Tull, playing with the London Symphony Orchestra, released in 1985. The music was arranged and conducted by David Palmer, who had collaborated with the band from 1968 and had been a full band member from 1976 to 1980. The album features band members Ian Anderson, Martin Barre, Dave Pegg and Peter-John Vettese.

The album was recorded during the summer of 1984 at the CBS Studios in London. It was released on 31 December 1985 in the United States, where it reached No. 93 in the charts.

== Track listing ==
No.	Title	Length
1.	"Locomotive Breath"	4:25
2.	"Thick as a Brick"	4:30
3.	"Elegy"	3:49
4.	"Bourrée"	3:14
5.	"Fly by Night"	4:17
6.	"Aqualung"	6:25
7.	"Too Old to Rock 'n' Roll: Too Young to Die"	3:32
8.	"Teacher / Bungle in the Jungle / Rainbow Blues / Locomotive Breath"	4:05
9.	"Living in the Past"	3:38
10.	"War Child"	5:01
Total length:		42:55

== Personnel ==
- Ian Anderson – flute, acoustic guitar
- Martin Barre – electric guitar
- Dave Pegg – bass guitar
- Peter-John Vettese – keyboards
- Paul Burgess – drums, percussion
- London Symphony Orchestra
- David Palmer – orchestral arrangements

== See also ==
- Ian Anderson Plays the Orchestral Jethro Tull
- Jethro Tull – The String Quartets
