= Minstrel in the Gallery =

1975 studio album by Jethro Tull

Studio album by Jethro Tull
- Released: 5 September 1975
- Recorded: 15 May – 7 June 1975
- Studios: Maison Rouge Mobile Studio, Monte Carlo, Monaco
- Genres: Progressive rock; hard rock; folk rock
- Length: 45:02
- Label: Chrysalis
- Producer: Ian Anderson

Jethro Tull chronology
War Child (1974)	Minstrel in the Gallery (1975)	M.U. – The Best of Jethro Tull (1976)

Singles from Minstrel in the Gallery
- 1. "Minstrel in the Gallery" Released: August 1975

Minstrel in the Gallery is the eighth studio album by British rock band Jethro Tull, released in September 1975. The album sees the band going in a different direction from their previous work War Child (1974), returning to a blend of electric and acoustic songs, in a manner closer to their early 1970s albums such as Benefit (1970), Aqualung (1971) and Thick as a Brick (1972). Making use of a newly constructed mobile recording studio commissioned and constructed specifically for the band, the album was the first Jethro Tull album to be recorded outside of the UK, being recorded in tax exile in Monte Carlo, Monaco.

It was the last Jethro Tull album to feature bassist Jeffrey Hammond, who left the band upon completion of the album's touring in late 1975 and was replaced by former Carmen bass player John Glascock.

== Background ==
In late 1974, upon completion of touring for the band's seventh album War Child, the band returned to the idea of recording outside of the UK with frontman Ian Anderson commissioning the creation of a mobile studio to allow the band to record anywhere they wished. The mobile studio, constructed by engineer Robin Black and Morgan Studios engineer Pete Smith, was christened the Maison Rouge Mobile Studio and was transported in April 1975 to Monte Carlo, Monaco, where the band would record the album in the Prince of Wales Hotel. Anderson rented a home in Los Angeles in December 1974 to finish writing of the album, where he was joined by orchestral arranger (and future Jethro Tull keyboardist) Dee Palmer to assist in finalizing string arrangements for the album.

== Recording ==
Recording began on 15 May 1975, recording "Minstrel in the Gallery", "Cold Wind to Valhalla", "Black Satin Dancer" and "One White Duck" and ended on 7 June 1975, finishing "Requiem". The majority of the album was recorded live by the whole band, with overdubs being added later. Many of the song's backing tracks were completed in a single take. The band made use of novel technical recording developments on the album, such as the Eventide 1745 digital delay processor to create the illusion of double tracked instruments on various tracks. The band originally hired a local Monte Carlo orchestra to record the string material on the album; however, the orchestra's unfamiliarity with working with a rock band made the recording difficult, and as a result a British string quartet which the band had previously worked with on the War Child Tour were used instead.

Anderson believed that the band were undergoing a tense period during the recording of the album and were not getting along well, a recollection that other band members have disagreed with. In particular, Anderson felt that the rest of the band was distracted by the seaside resort setting of Monaco: "I was full of industry and activity, writing songs and working very hard. I think the others felt as though it was a holiday as well as a recording session." Challenging Anderson's recollection, guitarist Martin Barre stated that "However we behaved, we were in a very alien situation, so you can't just think 'we're here to work, nothing else.' But the band got on great, and I don't recall any great frictions at all. It's just that Ian took it all very, very seriously." Drummer Barriemore Barlow agreed, describing the time in Monaco as "happy days". Anderson found himself unhappy in Monaco, with his ire drawn mostly from the residents: "It made me sick getting up in the morning and watching all these people lying on the beach with their amazing vanity. Most of them are really ugly people, physically grotesque; the women are unattractive and the men are obscene. And they do nothing. I get very aggressive in that sort of situation because I've got a lot of things to do."

== Musical styles and themes ==
The album's title refers to the use of a minstrel's gallery in the great hall of castles or manor houses, inspired by a balcony in the recording space, which is shown in a photo of the band on the back cover of the original LP. The minstrel analogy is used thematically in the lyrics of the title track and "Baker St. Muse". "Cold Wind to Valhalla" is based on elements of Norse mythology, such as the afterlife hall of Valhalla mentioned in the song's title and lyrics. The cover art of the album is based of the 1838 oil painting Twelfth Night Revels in the Great Hall, Haddon Hall, Derbyshire by artist Joseph Nash, depicting a group of minstrels performing to a raucous crowd of revelers at the Haddon Hall country estate. For the cover, the musicians in the original painting were replaced by the members of Jethro Tull.

Critics have described Minstrel in the Gallery's lyrics and subject matter as showing an introspective and cynical air, possibly the byproduct of Anderson's recent divorce from first wife Jennie Franks. However, Anderson has denied the divorce as inspiration for the album, saying that the album's subject matter is "like everything else, you mix a bit of personal stuff with a bit of fantasy."

Stylistically the album is varied, exemplary of Jethro Tull's progressive-influenced hard rock performances, with long instrumental passages, invested with elements of British folk and pre-Elizabethan sounds. Team Rock called Minstrel in the Gallery's musical style a "heavy metal take on the obsessively ornamented style of A Passion Play".

== Releases ==
Minstrel in the Gallery was remastered with five additional bonus tracks in November 2002, including incomplete live-in-the-studio renditions of "Minstrel in the Gallery" and "Cold Wind to Valhalla", some tracks that appeared only on maxi-singles ("Pan Dance", "March the Mad Scientist") and "Summerday Sands", which was the B-side of the "Minstrel in the Gallery" single.

In 2015, commemorating the 40th anniversary of Minstrel in the Gallery, it was released as a box set with two CDs and two DVDs, named La Grande Edition. The box contains rare and previously unreleased tracks (such as alternate takes from "Requiem", "Grace" and "One White Duck") including new stereo mixes by Steven Wilson and a live presentation, from 1975 in Palais des Sports, remixed by Jakko Jakszyk. It also includes an 80-page booklet featuring track-by-track annotations by Ian Anderson, a history of the group, and recollections of life on tour by road crew member Kenny Wylie, maintenance engineer Pete Smith and string section musician Liz Edwards. Heavyweight vinyl and standard CD editions of the album were also announced.

== Critical reception ==
Professional ratings
Review scores
Source	Rating
AllMusic	4/5 stars
The Encyclopedia of Popular Music	3/5 stars
Rolling Stone	(unfavourable)
Sounds	(favourable)

Rolling Stone gave a negative review to Minstrel in the Gallery, stating that "The fact that Ian Anderson and the lads have once again plundered the British secular music tradition signifies little and delivers less." The review referred to the music as "a wash of lugubrious string passages", the "anachronisms of Jeffrey Hammond-Hammond's mechanical bass lines" and "Martin Barre's hysterical electric guitar montages". They considered the lyrics "contrary to the LP's basic concept [...] instantly forgettable".

AllMusic ran a favourable retrospective review, stating that the album is the "most artistically successful and elaborately produced album since Thick as a Brick". Analysing the music, it said: "Martin Barre's attack on the guitar is as ferocious as anything in the band's history, and John Evan's organ matches him amp for amp, while Barriemore Barlow and Jeffrey Hammond-Hammond hold things together in a furious performance. Anderson's flair for drama and melody come to the fore in 'Cold Wind to Valhalla,' and 'Requiem' is perhaps the loveliest acoustic number in Tull's repertoire, featuring nothing but Anderson's singing and acoustic guitar, Hammond-Hammond's bass, and a small string orchestra backing them". Paul Stump's History of Progressive Rock called the album "a searching and accomplished effort. Diffuseness was now distilled into a sprightly, idiosyncratic collection of powerful numbers." He suggested that Jethro Tull's usage of additive rhythms on this album "proceeds to a level unmatched elsewhere in rock." He also found the music had greater emotional intensity and approved of the use of folksy acoustic guitar throughout.

Cash Box said of the title track that it "is a deft return to the density and meaty substance that characterized earlier works" and that "lots of heavy riffing effectively compliments [sic] Anderson’s vocal posturing while his unobtrusive flute runs stab at the periphery."

== Track listing ==
All tracks are written by Ian Anderson except "Minstrel in the Gallery", written by Anderson and Martin Barre. String arrangements by Dee Palmer.

Side one
No.	Title	Length
1.	"Minstrel in the Gallery"	8:13
2.	"Cold Wind to Valhalla"	4:19
3.	"Black Satin Dancer"	6:52
4.	"Requiem"	3:45

Side two
No.	Title	Length
1.	"One White Duck / 0^{10} = Nothing at All"	4:37
2.	"Baker St. Muse" including: "Pig-Me and the Whore"; "Nice Little Tune"; "Crash-Barrier Waltzer"; "Mother England Reverie"	16:39
3.	"Grace"	0:37
Total length:		45:02

== Personnel ==
Credits are adapted from Minstrel in the Gallery liner notes.

Jethro Tull

- Ian Anderson – vocals, flute, acoustic guitar
- Martin Barre – electric guitar
- John Evan – piano, organ
- Jeffrey Hammond – bass guitar, string bass
- Barriemore Barlow – drums, percussion

Additional personnel

- Dee Palmer – string quintet arrangements and conducting
  - Rita Eddowes, Elizabeth Edwards, Patrick Halling and Bridget Procter – violin
  - Katharine Thulborn – cello
- Brian Ward – photographs
- Ron Kriss and J.E. Garnett – front cover, based on a print by Joseph Nash
- Robin Black – sound engineering

== Charts ==
Chart (1975)	Peak position
Australian Albums (Kent Music Report)	20
Austrian Albums (Ö3 Austria)	7
Canada Top Albums/CDs (RPM)	45
Danish Albums (Tracklisten	8
Finnish Albums (The Official Finnish Charts)	28
French Albums (SNEP)	15
German Albums (Offizielle Top 100)	14
Italian Albums (Musica e Dischi)	20
New Zealand Albums (RMNZ)	23
Norwegian Albums (VG-lista)	13
Swedish Albums (Sverigetopplistan)	50
UK Albums (Official Charts)	20
US Billboard 200	7

Chart (2015)	Peak position
Dutch Albums (Album Top 100)	88
Italian Albums (FIMI)	37
Scottish Albums (Official Charts)	42
Spanish Albums (Promusicae)	58
UK Rock & Metal Albums (Official Charts)	3

Chart (2025)	Peak position
Croatian International Albums (HDU)	3

== Certifications ==
Region	Certification	Certified units/sales
Canada (Music Canada)	Gold	50,000^{^}
United Kingdom (BPI)	Silver	60,000^{^}
United States (RIAA)	Gold	500,000^{^}
^{^} Shipments figures based on certification alone.
