= The Best of Acoustic Jethro Tull =

The Best Of Acoustic

Greatest hits album by Jethro Tull
- Released: January 2007
- Recorded: 1969–2007
- Genre: Folk rock
- Length: 77:45
- Label: EMI Records
- Compiler: Ian Anderson

Jethro Tull chronology
Aqualung Live (2005)	The Best Of Acoustic (2007)	Live at Montreux 2003 (2007)

Professional ratings
Review scores
Source	Rating
Allmusic	4/5 stars

The Best of Acoustic (2007) is a greatest hits album by Jethro Tull. It includes some of the band's biggest acoustic hits from 1969 to 2007.

== Track listing ==
1. "Fat Man" - 2:51
2. "Life is a Long Song" - 3:18
3. "Cheap Day Return" - 1:22
4. "Mother Goose" - 3:53
5. "Wond'ring Aloud" - 1:55
6. "Thick as a Brick (Intro) (Edit No 1)" - 3:03
7. "Skating Away on the Thin Ice of the New Day" - 4:11
8. "Cold Wind to Valhalla (Intro)" - 1:29
9. "One White Duck / 0^{10} = Nothing at All" - 4:38
10. "Salamander" - 2:51
11. "Jack in the Green" - 2:29
12. "Velvet Green" - 6:03
13. "Dun Ringill" - 2:41
14. "Jack Frost and the Hooded Crow" - 3:23
15. "Under Wraps 2" - 2:14
16. "Jack-a-Lynn" - 4:56
17. "Someday the Sun Won't Shine for You" - 2:01
18. "Broadford Bazaar" - 3:39
19. "The Water Carrier" - 2:56
20. "Rupi's Dance" - 3:01
21. "A Christmas Song" - 2:41
22. "Weathercock" - 4:20
23. "One Brown Mouse" (2006 version) - 3:41
24. "Pastime with Good Company (Live in Denmark)" - 4:13
