= Woman in the Wings =

Studio album by Maddy Prior
- Released: May 1978
- Genre: Folk rock
- Length: 35:59
- Label: Chrysalis
- Producer: Ian Anderson; Dee Palmer; Robin Black

Maddy Prior chronology
| Woman in the Wings (1978) | Changing Winds (1978) |

Professional ratings
Review scores
| Source | Rating |
|---|---|
| AllMusic | 3/5 stars |

Woman in the Wings is the debut solo studio album by English singer Maddy Prior, the lead vocalist of Steeleye Span. The album was released in May 1978 by Chrysalis Records. It was produced by Ian Anderson, Dee Palmer and Robin Black. All the songs on the album were written by Prior.

== Track listing ==
1. "Woman in the Wings"
2. "Cold Flame"
3. "Mother and Child"
4. "Gutter Geese"
5. "Rollercoaster"
6. "Deep Water"
7. "Long Shadows"
8. "I Told You So"
9. "Rosettes"
10. "Catseyes"
11. "Baggy Pants"

== Personnel ==
- Maddy Prior - vocals
- Jethro Tull
  - Ian Anderson - flute on track 4 and backing vocals on track 5.
  - Martin Barre - guitar solo on track 2.
  - John Glascock - bass on tracks 1, 7, 9, 10.
  - Dee Palmer - keyboards on tracks 1, 3 and 6.
  - Barriemore Barlow - drums on tracks 1, 2, 4, 7, 8, 9 and 10.
- Andy Roberts - guitar 1, 2, 4, 5, 7, 9, 10 and 11.
- David Olney - bass on tracks 2, 4, 5, 8, 11.
- John Halsey - drums on tracks 4, 5 and 11.
- Barry Booth - piano on tracks 2 and 11.
- Bob Gill - guitar on track 8.
- Shona Anderson - backing vocals on track 10.
- Cherry Gillespie - backing vocals on track 10.
