= Cross-Eyed Mary =

1971 song by Jethro Tull

Song by Jethro Tull

from the album Aqualung
- Released: 19 March 1971
- Recorded: December 1970 – February 1971
- Studio: Island, London
- Genre: Progressive rock; hard rock
- Length: 4:06
- Label: Island (UK); Reprise (US)
- Songwriter: Ian Anderson
- Producers: Ian Anderson; Terry Ellis

"Cross-Eyed Mary" is a song by the British progressive rock band Jethro Tull from their album Aqualung (1971).

The song is about "Cross-Eyed Mary", a schoolgirl prostitute who prefers the company of "leching greys" over her schoolmates. It was intended as a companion piece to "Aqualung", the opening album track about a homeless man. The Aqualung character is given a cameo in "Cross-Eyed Mary"'s lyrics.

"Cross-Eyed Mary" was ranked the 12th best Jethro Tull song in the book Rock - Das Gesamtwerk der größten Rock-Acts im Check.

== Recorded appearances ==
- Aqualung (1971)
- Repeat – The Best of Jethro Tull – Vol II (1977)
- 25th Anniversary Box Set (1993)
- The Best of Jethro Tull – The Anniversary Collection (1993)

== Personnel ==
Jethro Tull

- Ian Anderson – vocals, acoustic guitar, flute
- Martin Barre – electric guitar
- John Evan – piano, organ, mellotron
- Jeffrey Hammond – bass guitar
- Clive Bunker – drums, percussion

Additional personnel

- Terry Ellis - producer

== Iron Maiden version ==
"Cross-Eyed Mary"

Song by Iron Maiden
- A-side: "The Trooper"
- Released: 1983
- Genre: Heavy metal
- Length: 3:52
- Label: EMI; Capitol
- Songwriter: Ian Anderson
- Producer: Martin Birch

Iron Maiden covered the song, which has been released in different ways (see Piece of Mind, "The Trooper", The First Ten Years and Best of the 'B' Sides). In a 2022 interview with BraveWords, Anderson discussed his thoughts about Maiden's cover, stating, "A spirited rendition by a young Bruce testing out his vocal range in a key not really suited to him!"
