= Burton Silverman =

American artist (born 1928)

- Born: 1928 (age 97–98); Brooklyn, New York City
- Education: The High School of Music & Art; Art Students League
- Alma mater: Columbia University
- Known for: Painting, drawing
- Notable work: Aqualung cover
- Movement: Classical Realism
- Website: www.burtonsilverman.com

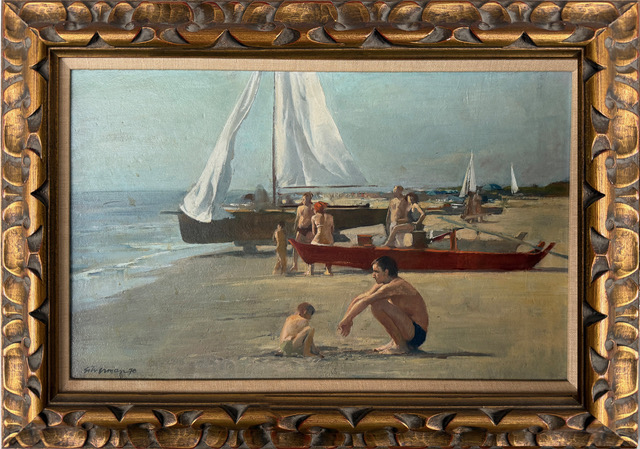
Burton Silverman, "Pietrasante Beach Scene," 1978, Oil on Panel, 12" x 19"

Burton Phillip Silverman (born 1928) is an American painter and illustrator associated with figurative art. His work is held in several public collections, including the Metropolitan Museum of Art and the Smithsonian American Art Museum. In 1956, he produced drawings documenting the Montgomery bus boycott, and he created the cover art for the album Aqualung by the band Jethro Tull. He has also taught at institutions such as the School of Visual Arts and George Washington University.

== Education ==
Silverman received a BA from Columbia College and pursued further studies at the Art Students League and the Pratt Institute. He has taught at several institutions, including the School of Visual Arts, the Art Students League, the National Academy School of Fine Arts, the Academy of Art University in San Francisco, and the College of Fine Arts at Brigham Young University. He also served as the Smith Distinguished Visiting Professor at George Washington University in Washington, D.C.

== Career ==
Silverman's work has been the subject of retrospectives at institutions including the Butler Institute of American Art, the Brigham Young Museum of Art, the Sherwin Miller Museum, the Lyme Academy of Fine Arts University, and the Hofstra University Museum.

His artwork has also been included in group exhibitions at venues such as the Smithsonian National Portrait Gallery, the Delaware Art Museum, and the Arnot Art Museum.

Silverman's paintings are part of various public collections, including the Brooklyn Museum, Metropolitan Museum of Art, Butler Institute of American Art, Denver Art Museum, Georgia Museum of Art, Philadelphia Museum of Art, New Britain Museum, Mint Museum, Smithsonian American Art Museum, Delaware Art Museum, Columbus Museum, Arkansas Art Center, Seven Bridges Foundation, and the Smith Museum of Auburn University.

He has held solo exhibitions at Gallery Henoch in New York City and at the Haynes Galleries in Nashville, Tennessee. His commissioned portrait work has included figures in fields such as law, medicine, and education, with clients reportedly including the University of Chicago, Yale University, Harvard University, Princeton University, and Weill Cornell Medical Center.

== Montgomery bus boycott ==
In 1956, Silverman and fellow artist Harvey Dinnerstein traveled to Montgomery, Alabama, to document the events surrounding the Montgomery bus boycott, which began after Black residents protested the city's segregated public transportation system. During their visit, the two artists produced more than 90 drawings depicting scenes such as courtroom proceedings, church gatherings, and portraits of individuals participating in the protest.

Although individual drawings were featured in earlier exhibitions, the full collection was first presented in 2005 at the Delaware Art Museum and later in 2006 at the Montgomery Museum of Fine Art under the title "In Glorious Dignity: Drawings of the Montgomery Bus Boycott". The exhibition catalog noted the artists' intent to document the actions of those involved in a significant act of civil disobedience, which became a pivotal event in the Civil Rights Movement. Silverman and Dinnerstein described the boycott as reflecting broader concerns about racial inequality in the United States.

== Style ==
Realism has made something of a resurgence at the beginning of the 21st century and many in the latest generation cite Silverman's work as inspiration, much as Silverman himself drew upon and advanced upon the works of Rembrandt, Degas, Sargeant, and more. "I have tried to reunite form—both color and composition—with content. the realistic and narrative imagery, to arrive at some kind of synthesis of 20th century formalism with 20th century sensibilities", Silverman has said. "I do not believe that the way paint is applied to a canvas should be more important than what is portrayed." After being discharged from the U.S. Armed Forces, he worked as both gallery artist and illustrator. For the latter, he was elected to the Society of Illustrators Hall of Fame in 2001.

In addition to illustrations featured in Time magazine, Sports Illustrated, and Esquire, famously, Silverman's watercolor painting was featured on Jethro Tull's 1971 album, Aqualung, an iconic image that is still celebrated today.

Beginning in the early 1990s, Silverman focused on portraiture and refining his style, which ran in opposition to the dictums and tenets of modernist art—in and of itself a radical act. "In view of the many honors he has been accorded, it may seem odd to describe Burton Silverman as an artistic underdog, yet the designation actually fits. Unlike his exact contemporary, the abstract expressionist Cy Twombly, Silverman is neither world famous nor rich. This situation says less about the immense talents of these two men than it does about the state of American art in the 20th century", the art historian Mathias Anderson wrote.

According to Dartmouth College's Robert C. McGrath, "His art may be seen as a kind of radical realism by virtue of its continuing devotion to a humanist vision that has survived modernist dogma of the 50s as well as the austere impersonal canons of judgment embedded in the 'new realism' of the eighties. For Silverman, form remains inextricably linked to meaning. Asserting itself throughout his painting is the fluid brushwork and natural coloration that informs the eye while eliciting, alchemically, a compassionate understanding of the human condition. In the final analysis, it is Silverman's unflinching vision together with his creative rethinking of tradition that constitutes his most defiant and enduring artistic contribution."

== Awards ==
He is the recipient of nine awards from the National Academy of Design Museum including two Henry W. Ranger Purchase Awards. He was awarded a Gold Medal from the Portrait Society of America in 2004, the Annual Distinguished Artist Award from the Newington Cropsey Cultural Foundation, The John Singer Sargent Gold Medal from the American Society of Portrait Artists, 2002, the Lifetime Achievement Award The FACE Conference, 2018 and an Honorary Doctorate from the Academy of Art University in San Francisco, 2001.

=== Other Awards Include ===
- 2020 – The Benjamin West Clinedinst Memorial Medal for distinguished achievement in the arts
- 2018 - Face Lifetime Achievement Award
- 2005 – Newington Cropsey Cultural Center Award for Excellence in the Arts
- 2004 – Gold Medal Lifetime Award, Portrait Society of America
- 2001 – Honorary Doctorate, awarded by the Academy of Art College, San Francisco, California

== Reviews ==
- Maureen Bloomfield, "In Context: an interview with Burton Silverman", The Artist's Magazine, May 2015
- Maureen Bloomfield, "Masters and Mentors", New Realism, 2016
- Michael Gormley, "Face It; Talking about Portraiture with Burton Silverman", Fine Art Connoisseur, Nov-Dec. 2014
- Austin Williams, "7 Influential Teachers of Our Time", American Artist, Dec. 2012
- Michael Gormley, "Three Painters Visualize the Real World", American Artist, Feb. 2012
- John O'Hern, "Everyday People", American Art Review, Dec. 2011
- Adam Van Doren, "Realism Redux", American Artist, Oct. 2011
- Ira Goldberg, "In search of the Humane", Linea, The Art Student's League, Fall 2011
- Naomi Esperigin, "What Is Genuine? Realist Artists Take on Hard Times", American Artist, 2010
- Tracy Fieldstat, "When Artists take on the Hard Times", Fine Art Connoisseur, Feb. 2010
- Karen York, "Realism Recovered: The Art of Burton Silverman", 2010 exhibition catalog
- Matthias Alexander, "Burton Silverman: Sight and Insight", Fine Art Connoisseur, March-Apr. 2007
- Herman Dutoit, "The Intimate Eye: The Drawings of Burton Silverman", Brigham Young University, 2006
- Mark M Johnson, "Protest in Montgomery", Montgomery Museum of Art, Alabama, introductions to the catalogue, 2006
- Joseph Keiffer, "Burton Silverman", American Arts Quarterly. Spring 1999
- Michael Ward, "Letter From a Guest", The Artist's Magazine, 1991
- Steven Heller, "Review", Arts Magazine, January 1984.
- Charles Offin, "Burton Silverman at Far", Arts Magazine, May 1970
- Brian O'Doherty, "Art: A Return to Old Masters' World", The New York Times, February 2, 1962

== Books by Silverman ==
- Naked: The Nude in America, Dykstra, Bram 2010
- The Intimate Eye: the Drawings of Burton Silverman, Brigham Young University Press 2006, Herman Dutoit, curator 2006, ISBN 0-8425-2645-5
- The Illustrator in America, 1860-2000, Society of Illustrators, Walt Read 2001 ISBN 0-8230-2523-3
- Sight and Insight: The Art of Burton Silverman, Madison Square Press, NY 1999, featuring essays by John McGrath, Philip Saietta, and Burton Silverman; preface by Campbell Gray, Director, BYU Museum; foreword by Louis Zona, Director, Butler Institute of American Art, ISBN 0-942604-68-7
- Painting People, Watson Guptill, 1977 ISBN 0-8230-3815-7
- Breaking the Rules of Watercolor, Watson Guptill, NY 1981 ISBN 0-942604-68-7

== Videos ==
- Human Landscapes
- Interview
