= Dustin's Bar Mitzvah =

English four-piece band

Dustin's Bar Mitzvah was an English four-piece band from Acton, London. They were signed to Hungry Kid Records in the United Kingdom and Vinyl Junkie records in Japan. Dustin's Bar Mitzvah has achieved greater success in Japan, issuing a collection of demos entitled Dial M For Mitzvah and entering the Japanese singles chart. They have released three singles in the UK: "Jimmy White" / "Lucy", "To The Ramones" and "Kick Him Out". They released their debut album, Get Your Mood On, on 4 December 2006.

However, the band announced their decision to split up in April 2007 after drummer Desmond Wolfe decided to quit.

On 15 August 2011, they announced they were reforming for one gig at London's Lexington on 1 October.

== Discography ==
=== Albums ===
- Dial M For Mitzvah (Japan only) – November 2005

*Get Your Mood On – December 2006

- Get Your Mood On (Japanese edition) – October 2006

=== Singles/EPs ===
- "Jimmy White" / "Lucy" – 4 April 2005
- "To The Ramones" – 20 February 2006
- "Kick Him Out" – 21 August 2006
- "I Love You So Much I've Been Sick on Myself" (released free online through official website) – 1 September 2011
