= Barriemore Barlow =

English musician

- Born: Barrie Barlow; 10 September 1949 (age 76); Birmingham, England
- Genres: Progressive rock, hard rock, heavy metal
- Occupations: Musician, songwriter, producer
- Instruments: Drums, percussion, flute
- Years active: 1963–present
- Website: Biography on official Jethro Tull website

Barrie "Barriemore" Barlow (born 10 September 1949, Birmingham) is an English musician, best known as the drummer and percussionist for the rock band Jethro Tull, from May 1971 to June 1980.

Christened Barrie, 'Barriemore' was an affectation to suit the eccentric image of Jethro Tull (much as Jeffrey Hammond had become "Jeffrey Hammond-Hammond").

== Early career ==
Barlow first met Ian Anderson and John Evans (credited as John Evan on Jethro Tull albums) in Blackpool, where the two were members of a beat group, The Blades. He left a career as an apprentice plastic mould tool fitter to start playing full-time with Anderson and Evan's band. However, his first public appearance was not as a musician, but as a TV extra in the series Coronation Street in which he briefly appeared alongside Anderson's then-girlfriend, actress Yvonne Nicholson.

After leaving The John Evan Band, as The Blades were by then known, Barlow joined another local group "The All Jump Kangaroo Band" featuring and run by Andy Trueman, who became the production manager for Jethro Tull in 1995.

== With Jethro Tull ==
Barlow joined Jethro Tull in 1971, after the departure of Clive Bunker. Barlow played on the EP "Life's a Long Song", before embarking on a concert tour with the band. At this point Jethro Tull included all the original members of The Blades, with the addition of Martin Barre, and it became a relatively long-running edition of the Jethro Tull lineup (late 1971–1975).

Barlow's first gig with Tull involved an unfortunate episode in Denver, Colorado, when the local police tear-gassed the audience from helicopters, both outside and inside the Red Rocks Amphitheatre. Believing that they would be arrested, the band made a run for it after the show in an unmarked station wagon where, hidden under a blanket on the floor in the back, Barlow was heard to ask Anderson, "Will it be like this every night?" Anderson replied, "As a general rule, only on Tuesdays and Thursdays."

Upset by the death of bassist John Glascock, with whom he had become very close, Barlow left Jethro Tull in 1980 after completing the final leg of the Stormwatch tour.

== As a session musician ==
After leaving Jethro Tull, Barlow went on to do various session projects, including work with Robert Plant, John Miles, and Jimmy Page, and was one of the few drummers that Plant and Page considered as a remote possibility to replace John Bonham in Led Zeppelin after his death, though the band decided to break up instead. He also briefly started his own band called Storm. He played on Kerry Livgren's debut solo album Seeds of Change (1980), and Yngwie Malmsteen's debut album, Rising Force (1984).

Barlow played concerts in a group called Tandoori Cassette in the mid-1980s, with Zal Cleminson, on guitar, Charlie Tumahai on bass and Ronnie Leahy on keyboards. No albums were released from Tandoori Cassette, but they can be heard in a release of 'Angel Talk' and 'Third World Briefcases' on YouTube. Tandoori Cassette disbanded after a few years.

Barlow has a recording studio, The Doghouse, on his property in Shiplake, Oxfordshire, England. He is currently managing a band from Henley on Thames called The Repertoires, and has also been linked with other local bands which echo his own folk-influenced musical history, such as Reading's Smokey Bastard.

Barlow played percussion on "Artrocker," the opening track of the 2006 album Get Your Mood On by London indie punk band Dustin's Bar Mitzvah.

On 28 May 2008 Barlow guested with Jethro Tull at Royal Festival Hall in London, performing "Heavy Horses", "Thick as a Brick" and a concert-closing "Locomotive Breath", where he and Doane Perry both played the drums.

== Drumming technique ==
Barlow is known as a very technical and creative drummer. He was called "the greatest rock drummer England ever produced" by John Bonham. In a comment on his drumming for the Jethro Tull albums he said; "I've always admired people who invent—and on a percussion level, I admire inventors of rhythm. I tried to strive for that in Tull, but now I go to great lengths to advise the drummers in the bands I'm managing not to play anything like I used to play in Tull, because it was so busy and over-the-top." Barlow has cited Joe Morello, Buddy Rich, Ringo Starr and Michael Giles as being among his primary influences.

== Discography ==
=== With Jethro Tull ===
- "Life's a Long Song" (1971 EP)
- Thick as a Brick (1972)
- Living in the Past (compilation including above EP)
- A Passion Play (1973)
- War Child (1974)
- Minstrel in the Gallery (1975)
- Too Old to Rock 'n' Roll: Too Young to Die! (1976)
- Songs from the Wood (1977)
- Heavy Horses (1978)
- Bursting Out (1978)
- Stormwatch (1979)

=== With Kerry Livgren ===
- Seeds of Change (1980)

=== With Robert Plant ===
- The Principle of Moments (1983)

=== With Yngwie Malmsteen ===
- Rising Force (1984)

=== With John Miles ===
- Transition (1985)

=== With Jimmy Page ===
- Outrider (1988)
