= Too Old to Rock 'n' Roll: Too Young to Die (song) =

Single by Jethro Tull

from the album Too Old to Rock 'n' Roll: Too Young to Die!
- B-side: "Rainbow Blues"
- Released: 19 March 1976
- Genre: Progressive rock
- Label: Chrysalis
- Songwriter(s): Ian Anderson
- Producer(s): Ian Anderson

Jethro Tull singles chronology
"Living in the Past" (1976)	"Too Old to Rock 'n' Roll: Too Young to Die" (1976)	"Ring Out, Solstice Bells" (1976)

"Too Old to Rock 'n' Roll: Too Young to Die" is a song by British progressive rock band Jethro Tull. Written by frontman Ian Anderson, it was released on their 1976 album of the same name. Written about an aging biker, the song title was inspired by a flight Anderson had taken in the United States.

"Too Old to Rock 'n' Roll: Too Young to Die" was released as its album's only single in March 1976, though it did not see success on the charts. The song has since become a fan favorite and has seen positive reception from critics.

== Background ==
The title for the song came to Ian Anderson on a turbulent plane ride. He recalled:

The title came to my mind on a very, very bad, turbulent flight in the USA. I hate flying anyway, but this was a really bad flight, and I was convinced we were all gonna drop out of the sky, and just the words came into my head, "I'm too old to rock and roll, but I'm too young to die." And I wrote that down on a piece of paper and decided to make something of it.

Anderson then used the title lyric to create a story about Ray Lomas, an aging biker. He recalled, "It seemed more fun to write a song about an old biker who refuses to change with the times and clings to his lifestyle, to his culture. And along with the clothing, the fashions, the music and the things that are part of it; in other words, he's a bit of a luddite and doesn't take well to change."

Because of the song's release during the ascent of punk rock, some critics have proposed that the song is autobiographical. Anderson responded to this, "I'm not [writing autobiographically]. The character is in the third person in the lyrics of the song, so it's quite clearly descriptive." In another interview, Anderson reflected,

When I was 15 or 16 years old and became interested in music, my interest lay primarily in American black blues artists and it completely escaped me that these people were already in their 50s, 60s and 70s at the time I started listening to them. It just seemed absolutely unimportant. It was the music and the emotion and the thing it was saying that was intriguing. I never actually gave a second thought to how old these people were.

Steeleye Span vocalist Maddy Prior makes a guest appearance on the song.

== Release ==
In addition to its release on the Too Old to Rock 'n' Roll: Too Young to Die! album, "Too Old to Rock 'n' Roll: Too Young to Die" was released as the album's sole single in March 1976. The single featured "Rainbow Blues" on the B-side. Despite the lack of commercial success, the song has since become a fan favorite and has garnered airplay on rock radio stations. Ian Anderson reflected on this, "It wasn't an instant, out-of-the-box favorite of our audiences, but it seems to have caught on over the years."

"Too Old to Rock 'n' Roll: Too Young to Die" has since been featured on multiple compilation albums, including Repeat – The Best of Jethro Tull – Vol II, Original Masters, The Best of Jethro Tull – The Anniversary Collection, The Very Best Of, and 50 for 50. Live versions of the song appeared on Jethro Tull live albums Bursting Out, Live at Hammersmith '84, and A Little Light Music.

"Too Old to Rock 'n' Roll: Too Young to Die" also features on the 1981 concert video release Slipstream. The song was one of four on Slipstream for which the band filmed a new music video.

== Reception and legacy ==
In an otherwise critical review of its parent album, "Too Old to Rock 'n' Roll: Too Young to Die" was praised by Rolling Stone critic David McGee as "a textbook example of the use of dynamics and nuance in a rock song." George Starostin wrote that it "completely overshadows every other tune on here", calling the song "a rightful Tull classic, starting with a pathetic, but fascinating guitar pattern and featuring truly clever lyrics about the fates of old rockers." Eric Senich of WRKI ranked the song the ninth best Jethro Tull song. It was ranked the 13th best Jethro Tull song by Rock - Das Gesamtwerk der größten Rock-Acts im Check.

During the 1989 American invasion of Panama, the CIA blasted, among other rock songs, "Too Old to Rock 'n' Roll: Too Young To Die" outside of the Apostolic Nunciature in Panama. This measure was seen as an attempt to dislodge military dictator Manuel Noriega from hiding, though the report of the Office of the Chairman of the Joint Chiefs of Staff claimed that the music was used principally to prevent parabolic microphones from being used to eavesdrop on negotiations.
