= Aqualung (song) =

1971 song by Jethro Tull

Song by Jethro Tull

from the album Aqualung
- Released: 19 March 1971
- Recorded: December 1970 – February 1971
- Studio: Island, London
- Genre: Progressive rock; hard rock; folk rock
- Length: 6:34
- Label: Island (UK); Reprise (US); Chrysalis/Capitol (US re-issue)
- Songwriters: Ian Anderson; Jennie Anderson
- Producers: Ian Anderson; Terry Ellis

"Aqualung" is a song by the British progressive rock band Jethro Tull, and the title track from their Aqualung (1971) album. The song was written by the band's frontman, Ian Anderson, and his then-wife Jennie Franks.

While this track was never a single, the album, Aqualung, was Jethro Tull's first American top 10 album, reaching number seven in June 1971. After "Locomotive Breath", it is the song most often played in concert by Jethro Tull.

== Recording ==
The original recording runs for 6:34. In an interview with singer Ian Anderson in the September 1999 Guitar World, he said:

Aqualung wasn't a concept album, although a lot of people thought so. The idea came about from a photograph my wife at the time took of a tramp in London. I had feelings of guilt about the homeless, as well as fear and insecurity with people like that who seem a little scary. And I suppose all of that was combined with a slightly romanticized picture of the person who is homeless but yet a free spirit, who either won't or can't join in society's prescribed formats. So from that photograph and those sentiments, I began writing the words to "Aqualung". I can remember sitting in a hotel room in L.A., working out the chord structure for the verses. It's quite a tortured tangle of chords, but it was meant to really drag you here and there and then set you down into the more gentle acoustic section of the song.

The Aqualung character is also mentioned in "Cross-Eyed Mary", the next song on the album.

In a 2015 interview, Martin Barre recounted a situation with Led Zeppelin while recording the song's solo:

We'd locked ourselves away in the studio—us doing Aqualung, and them working on Led Zeppelin IV—and I hadn't seen Jimmy Page at all. Finally, he walked into the control room to say hello, just as I was recording the solo to "Aqualung". Now, in those days, if you didn't get a guitar solo in one or two takes, it might become a flute solo. It was, 'Go in there and do it or else.' And here was Jimmy waving like mad—'Hey, Martin!'—and I'm thinking, 'I can't wave back, or I'm going to blow the solo!'

An alternative mix of "Aqualung", with a very different echo effect on Anderson's vocal, appears on the compilation M.U. – The Best of Jethro Tull (1976). This version also has different acoustic guitar and vocal parts during the first part of the song ("sun streaking cold"), but then reverts to the regular mix at ("Aqualung my friend..."). This is most likely because all the tracks from Aqualung on M.U. – The Best of Jethro Tull were taken from the original quad-mix of the LP.

The track was not released as a single. As Ian Anderson explained during an interview with Songfacts:

Because it was too long, it was too episodic, it starts off with a loud guitar riff and then goes into rather more laid back acoustic stuff. Led Zeppelin at the time, you know, they didn't release any singles. It was album tracks. And radio sharply divided between AM radio, which played the 3-minute pop hits, and FM radio, where they played what they called deep cuts. You would go into an album and play the obscure, the longer, the more convoluted songs in that period of more developmental rock music. But that day is not really with us anymore, whether it be classic rock stations that do play some of that music, but they are thin on the ground, and they too know that they've got to keep it short and sharp and cheerful, and provide the blue blanket of familiar sounding music and get onto the next set of commercial breaks, because that's what pays the radio station costs of being on the air. So pragmatic rules apply.

== Recorded appearances ==
- Aqualung (1971)
- M.U. – The Best of Jethro Tull (1976)
- Bursting Out (1978)
- Slipstream (1981)
- A Classic Case (1985)
- Original Masters (1985)
- 20 Years of Jethro Tull (1988)
- 20 Years of Jethro Tull: Highlights (1988)
- The Very Best of Jethro Tull (2001)
- Living with the Past (2002)
- A New Day Yesterday (2003)
- Ian Anderson Plays the Orchestral Jethro Tull (2005)
- Aqualung Live (2005)

== Personnel ==
Jethro Tull

- Ian Anderson – vocals, acoustic guitar, producer
- Martin Barre – electric guitar
- John Evan – piano, electronic organ
- Jeffrey Hammond – bass guitar
- Clive Bunker – drums, percussion

Additional Personnel

- Terry Ellis – producer
