= Jennie Franks =

British actor, playwright and photographer

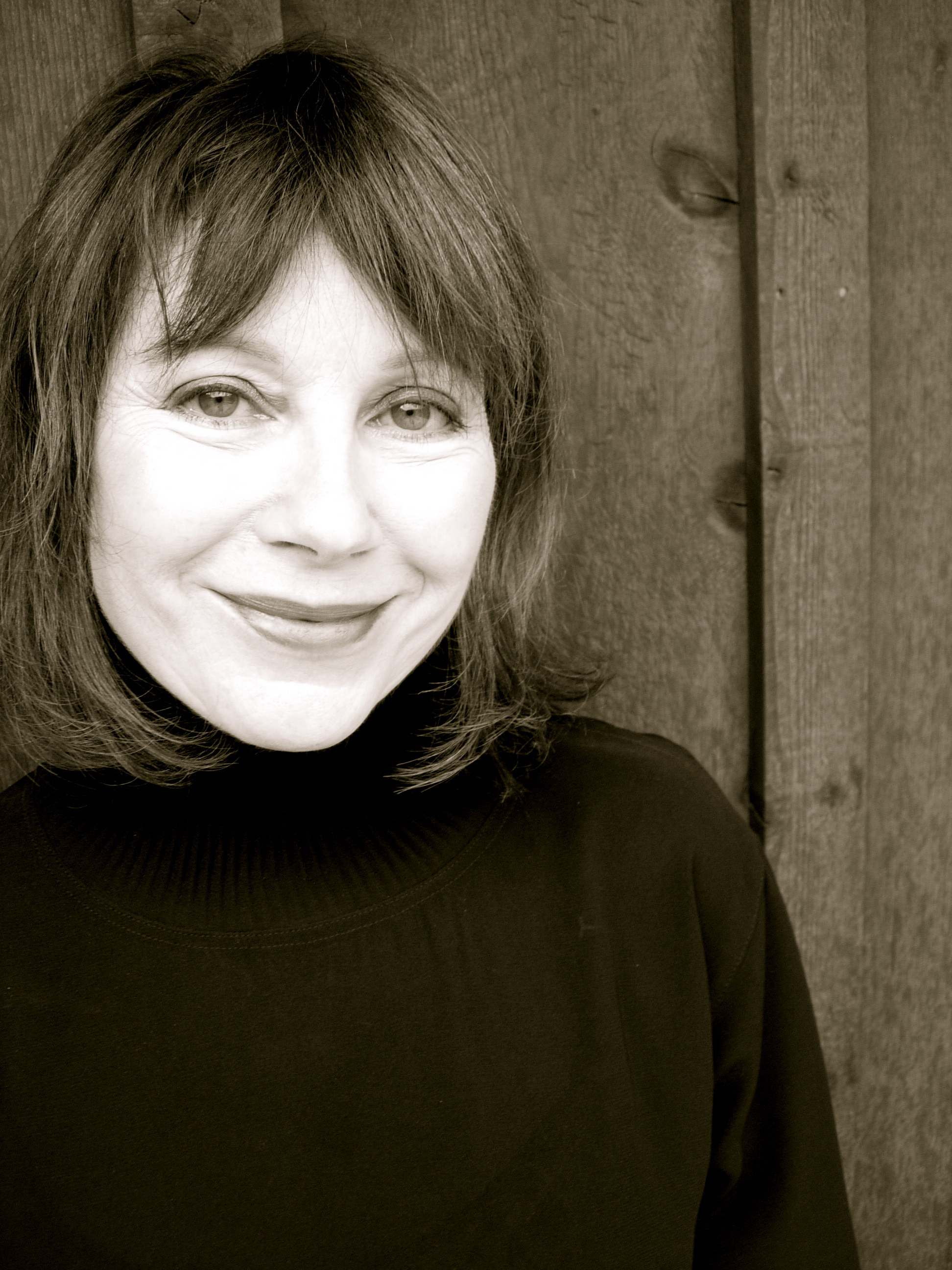
Jennie Franks

Jennie Franks is an English playwright and filmmaker. She was the first wife of Jethro Tull frontman Ian Anderson, and wrote some of the lyrics for the Jethro Tull song "Aqualung" (1971).

== Career ==
Franks co-wrote and directed an educational film about the effects of AIDS in rural Colorado titled Soft Smoke, AIDS in the Rural West. She wrote and acted in the play Stuck!, about "one woman's courageous struggle to get out of a locked basement bathroom at a coffee house and reclaim control of her stalled life", which debuted in New York in 2008. She filmed The Ballad of Arthur Muldoon with Terry Jones.

Franks founded SPARKy Productions in 1998, a group dedicated to highlighting social justice issues via creative performance, and acts as its artistic director. The organization produced the annual Telluride Playwrights Festival. The film festival culminated in 2016 with Franks' production of The Hispanic Women's Project.

== Life ==
Franks was the first wife of Jethro Tull frontman Ian Anderson, from 1970 to 1974. She wrote some of the lyrics for the Jethro Tull song "Aqualung" (1971). Ian Anderson, the principal songwriter for Jethro Tull, has said, "[she] in fact was responsible for lyrics in the first couple of verses ... I suppose in total probably about half of the lyrics were words or word associations that she had come up with," based on pictures of homeless men Franks had taken as a photography student. "And so she wrote some words and we fashioned that into lyrics. Some of the lines were definitely not lines I would have written. Like, “Snot is running down his nose” was not one of mine [laughs], it was one of hers."

Franks later moved to Los Angeles and married screenwriter and novelist Jeffrey Price. They relocated to Telluride, Colorado in 1993. Franks and her second husband have two daughters.
