= Aqualung (album) =

1971 album by Jethro Tull

Studio album by Jethro Tull
- Released: 19 March 1971
- Recorded: April 1970; June 1970; December 1970; February 1971
- Studios: Island Studios, London; Morgan Studios, London
- Genres: Hard rock; folk rock; progressive rock
- Length: 42:55
- Labels: Chrysalis/Island (Europe); Reprise (America, Japan and Oceania)
- Producers: Ian Anderson, Terry Ellis

Jethro Tull chronology
Benefit (1970)	Aqualung (1971)	Thick as a Brick (1972)

Singles from Aqualung
- 1. "Locomotive Breath" Released: March 1971; 2. "Hymn 43" Released: June 1971

Aqualung is the fourth studio album by the British rock band Jethro Tull, released on 19 March 1971 by Chrysalis Records. Blending progressive rock, folk and hard rock, the album expands on the eclectic musical approaches explored on the band's previous albums by featuring riff-heavy rock songs alongside acoustic, singer-songwriter material placing greater emphasis on lead vocalist and primary songwriter Ian Anderson. Lyrically, the album addresses themes of religion and spirituality, alongside social issues such as homelessness and prostitution. Its prominent critique of organized religion led some critics to describe Aqualung as a concept album, a characterization the band has consistently denied.

Recorded at Island Records' new recording studio in Basing Street, London, Aqualung was Jethro Tull's first album with keyboardist John Evan as a full-time member, their first with new bassist Jeffrey Hammond, and last featuring Clive Bunker on drums, who left the band shortly after the release of the album. The recording process was hindered by technical difficulties associated with the new studio, with Anderson expressing doubts about the album, viewing it as a make-or-break moment for the band.

Aqualung was a major commercial success, becoming Jethro Tull's best-selling album with sales exceeding seven million copies worldwide and marking the band's emergence as a regular presence on FM radio and major arena act. Initial critical reception was mostly positive, with the album since receiving widespread retrospective acclaim for its musical experimentation and engagement with philosophical and social themes. It produced two successful singles, "Hymn 43" and "Locomotive Breath", the latter of which remains one of the band's most iconic songs. The album's title track, "Aqualung", has become one of the band's best-known songs, due in part to its distinctive lead guitar riff played by Martin Barre. Aqualung has frequently appeared on best-of album lists and has been cited as an influence by numerous artists within rock and progressive music.

== Production ==
The bulk of the album was recorded at Basing Street Studios, London, in December 1970, with some re-recording taking place in February 1971 after the January European tour. Two tracks had been laid down at Morgan Studios earlier in 1970: a first version of "My God" on 11–12 April; then "Wond'ring Aloud, Again" on 21 June. Those two early 1970 tracks were recorded with a different bass player than used for the main recordings. After the last of the 1970 American tours, bass player Glenn Cornick was fired from the band, and was replaced with Jeffrey Hammond, an old friend of Ian Anderson. Aqualung was Hammond's first album with the band, and the first album for keyboard player John Evan as a full member; his previous involvement had been as an additional musician on Benefit.

The album was one of the first to be recorded at Island Records' newly opened recording studios on Basing Street. Led Zeppelin did some recording for Led Zeppelin IV at the same time, though in the smaller of the two studios in the converted chapel. In an interview on the 25th anniversary edition of the album, Tull's bandleader Ian Anderson said that trying to record in the larger studio was very difficult, because of its "horrible, cold, echoey" feel.

As with the previous Tull albums, production was done by Anderson and the band's manager, Terry Ellis. Anderson wanted a producer, but felt he would be uncomfortable sharing creativity and authority with another person; and was concerned about having a producer who would take drugs. He spoke about that dilemma with George Martin, who concluded that it would be better if they carried on doing it themselves. The orchestral segments were arranged by Dee Palmer, who had worked with the band since 1968's This Was, and would later join as a keyboard player. The master reels were assembled at Apple Studios on 2 March 1971. Aqualung would be the last Jethro Tull album to include Clive Bunker as a band member, as he retired shortly after recording to start a family.

== Musical style ==
The songs on the album encompass a variety of musical genres, with elements of folk, blues, psychedelia, and hard rock. In a stylistic departure from Jethro Tull's earlier albums, many of Aqualung's songs are acoustic. "Cheap Day Return", "Wond'ring Aloud" and "Slipstream" are short, completely acoustic "bridges", and "Mother Goose" is mostly acoustic. Anderson claims his main inspirations for writing the album were Roy Harper and Bert Jansch.

== Songs and themes ==
Aqualung has generally been regarded as a concept album with a central theme of "the distinction between religion and God". The album's "dour musings on faith and religion" have marked it as "one of the most cerebral albums ever to reach millions of rock listeners". Academic discussions of the nature of concept albums have frequently listed Aqualung amongst their number.

The initial idea for the album was sparked by some photographs that Anderson's wife Jennie took of homeless people on the Thames Embankment. The appearance of one man in particular caught the interest of the couple, who together wrote the title song "Aqualung". Said Anderson: "I had feelings of guilt about the homeless, as well as fear and insecurity with people like that who seem a little scary." The first side of the LP, titled Aqualung, contains several character sketches, including the character of the title track, and the schoolgirl-aged prostitute Cross-Eyed Mary, as well as two autobiographical tracks, including "Cheap Day Return", written by Anderson after a visit to his critically ill father.

The second side, titled My God, contains three tracks—"My God", "Hymn 43" and "Wind-Up"—that address religion in an introspective, and sometimes irreverent, manner. However, despite the names given to the album's two sides and their related subject matter, Anderson has consistently maintained that Aqualung is not a "concept album". A 2005 interview included on Aqualung Live gives Anderson's thoughts on the matter:

I always said at the time that this is not a concept album; this is just an album of varied songs of varied instrumentation and intensity in which three or four are the kind of keynote pieces for the album but it doesn't make it a concept album. In my mind when it came to writing the next album, Thick as a Brick, was done very much in the sense of: 'Whuh, if they thought Aqualung was a concept album, Oh! Okay, we'll show you a concept album.' And it was done as a kind of spoof, a send-up, of the concept album genre. ... But Aqualung itself, in my mind was never a concept album. Just a bunch of songs.

Drummer Clive Bunker believes that the record's perception as a concept album is a case of "Chinese whispers", explaining "you play the record to a couple of Americans, tell them that there's a lyrical theme loosely linking a few songs, and then notice the figure of the Aqualung character on the cover, and suddenly the word is out that Jethro Tull have done a concept album".

The thematic elements Jethro Tull explored on the album—those of the effects of urbanisation on nature, and of the effects of social constructs such as religion on society—would be developed further on most of the band's subsequent releases. Ian Anderson's frustration over the album's labelling as a concept album directly led to the creation of Thick as a Brick (1972), intended to be a deliberately "over the top" concept album in response.

"Lick Your Fingers Clean" was recorded for Aqualung, but was not included on the album. The song was drastically re-worked as "Two Fingers" for Tull's 1974 album, War Child. "Lick Your Fingers Clean" was eventually released in 1988 on the 20 Years of Jethro Tull collection. It was then released as a bonus track on the 1996 and 2011 reissues of Aqualung.

Another song, "Wond'ring Again" was recorded on 21 June 1970 together with the original version of "Wond'ring Aloud" (included as one single seven-minute song on the Steven Wilson remaster of associated recordings 1970–1971, titled "Wond'ring Aloud, Again"), and was considered for release on the album before Anderson decided to drop it from the final track listing. "Wond'ring Again" was subsequently released on the compilation album, Living in the Past, in 1972. A re-recording of "Wond'ring Aloud" was included on Aqualung. Glenn Cornick played bass on the song and says that it is his favourite song he recorded with the band. Cornick played bass on early studio recordings of "My God" and "a couple of other songs", though he did not say which they were.

== Album cover ==
The album's cover art by Burton Silverman is a watercolour portrait of a scruffy homeless man with long tangled haired and beard in a bleak urban setting. The idea for the cover came from a photograph Anderson's wife took of a homeless man on Thames Embankment, and Anderson later felt it would have been better to have used the photograph rather than commission the painting. Ian Anderson recalls posing for a photograph for the painting, though Silverman claims it was a self-portrait.

The artwork was commissioned and purchased by Chrysalis Records head Terry Ellis in 1971. Silverman was paid a flat fee of $1,500 for the painting. There was no written contract. The artist says the art was only licensed for use as an album cover, and not for merchandising; he approached the band seeking remuneration for the additional uses, such as printing it on T-shirts and coffee mugs.

The original artwork for both the front and back covers is missing. They were apparently stolen from a London hotel room, or perhaps from Chrysalis' office during a robbery. The original artwork for the interior gatefold painting was not taken during the robbery and is held by Terry Ellis.

== Release ==
In April 1971, Aqualung peaked at number four on the UK Album Chart; when the CD version was released in 1996, it reached number 52. It peaked at No. 7 on the Billboard's North American pop albums chart; the single "Hymn 43" hit No. 91 on the Billboard Hot 100 chart. The album went on to sell over seven million copies, and is the band's best-selling album. Aqualung was one of Jethro Tull's albums that were released in quadraphonic sound. The quadraphonic version of "Wind Up", which is in a slightly higher key, is included on a later CD reissue of the album as "Wind Up (quad version)".

The single "Hymn 43" was released on 14 August 1971, and reached number 91 on the Billboard Hot 100 charts, spending two weeks in the chart. The song was the first single to chart by the band in the United States. It was later included in the video game Rock Band 2 as downloadable content; along with the title track, "Aqualung".

The album was re-released in a 40th anniversary edition on 31 October 2011. The release contains a new stereo and 5.1 surround remix of the album by British musician and producer Steven Wilson, the original quadraphonic mix, and comes in three different editions—a "collector's edition" containing the album on LP and two CDs, as well a DVD and a Blu-ray disc (with better sound quality than the DVD) and a hardback book; a "special edition" containing the two CDs and an abridged version of the book; and an "adapted edition" containing two CDs (with 2 extra songs not included in the other two 40th anniversary editions) and 2 DVDs in a hardcover book (written content is the same as in the Collector's Edition book, only the Chronology differs slightly). Justifying the remix, Steven Wilson said: "Jethro Tull's Aqualung is ... a masterpiece, but was sonically a very poor-sounding record. So, some didn't rate it as highly as they should have. What we did with Aqualung was really make that record gleam in a way it never gleamed before. I think a lot of people, including myself, have come around to thinking that the album is a lot better than they even gave it credit for previously. So, there is certainly something very gratifying about being able to polish what was already a diamond and making it shine in a way it never has before". Additionally, according to mastering engineer Steve Hoffman there were tape stretching problems with the original session mixdown master, implying that many editions of the album used multigeneration copies as their source.

== Critical reception ==
Professional ratings
Review scores
Source	Rating
AllMusic	4.5/5 stars
Christgau's Record Guide	C+
The Daily Vault	A
The Encyclopedia of Popular Music	4/5 stars
MusicHound Rock	4/5
PopMatters	10/10
Record Collector	4/5 stars
The Rolling Stone Album Guide	3.5/5 stars
Zagat Survey Music Guide - 1,000 Top Albums of All Time	5/5 stars

Aqualung received mixed to favourable reviews from contemporary music critics. Rolling Stone magazine's Ben Gerson lauded its "fine musicianship", calling it "serious and intelligent", although he felt that the album's seriousness "undermined" its quality. Sounds said that its "taste and variety" made it the band's "finest" work. Aqualung was voted the 22nd best album of 1971 in The Village Voice's annual Pazz & Jop critics' poll. Robert Christgau, the poll's creator, was more critical of the album, describing Anderson's undeveloped cultural interests and negative views on religion and human behaviour as both boring and pretentious.

In retrospective reviews the album is generally lauded and viewed as a classic. AllMusic's Bruce Eder called Aqualung "a bold statement" and "extremely profound". Of the album's 40th anniversary release, Sean Murphy of PopMatters noted that Aqualung "is, to be certain, a cornerstone of the then-nascent prog-rock canon, but it did—and does—exist wholly on its own terms as a great rock album, period." Murphy praised the additional material featured on the release, finding that the new content was "where a great album gets even better". Paul Stump's History of Progressive Rock was more measured in its praise, saying that Aqualung made little advancement over the group's previous album, Benefit. He identified the improvements as the deeper, wider arrangements, and the diversions of the melody from the bassline accompaniments. He found the side two song cycle rambling but added that "if the lyrics were now tending towards the provocatively obscure, they were none the less possessed of some style, not least in their Blakean allusions". Steve Harris, the bass player for the heavy metal band Iron Maiden, has called Aqualung "a classic album", lauding its "fantastic playing, fantastic songs, attitude [and] vibe". Iron Maiden would go on to cover "Cross-Eyed Mary" as the B-side of their 1983 single "The Trooper".

=== Accolades ===
Aqualung has been placed highly in retrospective listings, compiled by music writers and magazines. Martin Barre's solo on the album's title track was included in Guitarist magazine's list of "The 20 Greatest Guitar Solos of All Time" at number 20.

Publication	Country	Accolade	Year	Rank
The Village Voice	US	The 1971 Pazz & Jop Critics Poll	1972	22
Classic Rock	UK	The 100 Greatest Rock Albums of All Time	2001	30
Rolling Stone	US	500 Greatest Albums of All Time	2012	337
The 100 Best-Selling Albums of the 70s	UK		2004	90
Q	UK	40 Cosmic Rock Albums	2005	7
1001 Albums You Must Hear Before You Die	US		2005	No order
Guitarist	UK	The 20 Greatest Guitar Solos of All Time	2011	20
Prog	UK	The 100 Greatest Prog Albums of All Time	2014	43

== Track listing ==
=== Vinyl release (1971) ===
All tracks are written by Ian Anderson, except where noted.

Side one: Aqualung
No.	Title	Length
1.	"Aqualung" (Ian Anderson, Jennie Anderson)	6:34
2.	"Cross-Eyed Mary"	4:06
3.	"Cheap Day Return"	1:21
4.	"Mother Goose"	3:51
5.	"Wond'ring Aloud"	1:53
6.	"Up to Me"	3:15

Side two: My God
No.	Title	Length
1.	"My God"	7:08
2.	"Hymn 43"	3:14
3.	"Slipstream"	1:13
4.	"Locomotive Breath"	4:23
5.	"Wind-Up"	6:01

Original North American Reprise Records pressings of Aqualung contained a slightly edited version of the title song, with its first three seconds (i.e., the first utterance of the song's signature riff) removed. These pressings correspondingly list the song's length at 6:31.

=== CD issue (1996) ===
No.	Title	Length
12.	"Lick Your Fingers Clean"	2:46
13.	"Wind Up" (Quad Version)	5:24
14.	"Excerpts from the Ian Anderson Interview" (Mojo Magazine)	13:59
15.	"Song for Jeffrey" (BBC)	2:51
16.	"Fat Man" (BBC)	2:57
17.	"Bouree" (BBC, written by Ian Anderson, Johann Sebastian Bach)	3:58

=== 40th anniversary special edition (2011) ===
The 2011 version was remixed by Steven Wilson and remastered by Peter Mew.

CD 1: Original Album
No.	Title	Length

CD 2: Associated recordings 1970–1971
No.	Title	Length
1.	"Lick Your Fingers Clean"	2:49
2.	"Just Trying to Be"	1:38
3.	"My God" (Early Version)	9:43
4.	"Wond'ring Aloud" (13 December 1970)	1:52
5.	"Wind-Up" (Early Version)	5:22
6.	"Slipstream" (Take 2)	0:55
7.	"Up the 'Pool" (Early Version)	3:13
8.	"Wond'ring Aloud, Again"	7:08
9.	"Life is a Long Song"	3:20
10.	"Up the 'Pool"	3:09
11.	"Dr. Bogenbroom" (Original EP Stereo Mix)	2:58
12.	"From Later" (Original EP Stereo Mix)	2:04
13.	"Nursie" (Original EP Stereo Mix)	1:35
14.	"Reprise Radio Advert"	0:51

=== 40th anniversary adapted edition: Remixed and mastered by Steven Wilson (2016) ===
The 2016 edition was remastered by Steven Wilson of his 2011 remixed material as he did not like Peter Mew's mastering.

CD 1: Steven Wilson remaster and stereo remix of the album
No.	Title	Length
1.	"Aqualung"	6:38
2.	"Cross-Eyed Mary"	4:11
3.	"Cheap Day Return"	1:23
4.	"Mother Goose"	3:53
5.	"Wond'ring Aloud"	1:56
6.	"Up to Me"	3:17
7.	"My God"	7:13
8.	"Hymn 43"	3:19
9.	"Slipstream"	1:13
10.	"Locomotive Breath"	4:42
11.	"Wind-Up"	6:00

CD 2: Steven Wilson remaster of associated recordings 1970–1971 and stereo remix of tracks 1–10
No.	Title	Length
1.	"Lick Your Fingers Clean"	2:49
2.	"Just Trying to Be"	1:38
3.	"My God" (Early Version)	9:43
4.	"Wond'ring Aloud" (13 December 1970, the second known version of this song)	1:52
5.	"Wind-Up" (Early Version)	5:22
6.	"Slipstream" (Take 2)	0:55
7.	"Up the 'Pool" (Early Version)	3:13
8.	"Wond'ring Aloud, Again" (21 June 1970): The first recording of this song, actually made up of two parts: a. Wond'ring Aloud (the first version of Wond'ring Aloud); b. Wond'ring Again (Part II of Wond'ring Alound, originally released on Living In The Past)	7:08
9.	"Life is a Long Song"	3:20
10.	"Up the 'Pool"	3:13
11.	"Life is a Long Song" (Original EP Flat Transfer)	3:21
12.	"Up the 'Pool" (Original EP Flat Transfer)	3:13
13.	"Dr. Bogenbroom" (Original EP Flat Transfer)	3:01
14.	"From Later" (Original EP Flat Transfer)	2:09
15.	"Nursie" (Original EP Flat Transfer)	1:38
16.	"Reprise Radio Advert"	0:53

DVD 1: Steven Wilson 5.1 surround and stereo mixes of the album and associated recordings 1970–1971
No.	Title	Length
1.	"Aqualung" (5.1 Surround Mix)	6:38
2.	"Cross-Eyed Mary" (5.1 Surround Mix)	4:11
3.	"Cheap Day Return" (5.1 Surround Mix)	1:23
4.	"Mother Goose" (5.1 Surround Mix)	3:53
5.	"Wond'ring Aloud" (5.1 Surround Mix)	1:56
6.	"Up to Me" (5.1 Surround Mix)	3:17
7.	"My God" (5.1 Surround Mix)	7:13
8.	"Hymn 43" (5.1 Surround Mix)	3:19
9.	"Slipstream" (5.1 Surround Mix)	1:13
10.	"Locomotive Breath" (5.1 Surround Mix)	4:42
11.	"Wind-Up" (5.1 Surround Mix)	6:00
12.	"Aqualung" (Stereo Mix)	6:38
13.	"Cross-Eyed Mary" (Stereo Mix)	4:11
14.	"Cheap Day Return" (Stereo Mix)	1:23
15.	"Mother Goose" (Stereo Mix)	3:53
16.	"Wond'ring Aloud" (Stereo Mix)	1:56
17.	"Up to Me" (Stereo Mix)	3:17
18.	"My God" (Stereo Mix)	7:13
19.	"Hymn 43" (Stereo Mix)	3:19
20.	"Slipstream" (Stereo Mix)	1:13
21.	"Locomotive Breath" (Stereo Mix)	4:42
22.	"Wind-Up" (Stereo Mix)	6:00
23.	"Lick Your Fingers Clean" (5.1 Surround Mix)	2:49
24.	"Just Trying to Be" (5.1 Surround Mix)	1:38
25.	"My God" (Early Version) (5.1 Surround Mix)	9:43
26.	"Wind-Up" (Early Version) (5.1 Surround Mix)	5:22
27.	"Wond'ring Aloud, Again" (5.1 Surround Mix)	7:08
28.	"Life is a Long Song" (5.1 Surround Mix)	3:20
29.	"Up the 'Pool" (5.1 Surround Mix)	3:13
30.	"Lick Your Fingers Clean" (Stereo Mix)	2:49
31.	"Just Trying to Be" (Stereo Mix)	1:38
32.	"My God" (Early Version) (Stereo Mix)	9:43
33.	"Wond'ring Aloud" (13 December 1970) (Stereo Mix)	1:52
34.	"Wind-Up" (Early Version) (Stereo Mix)	5:22
35.	"Slipstream" (Take 2) (Stereo Mix)	0:55
36.	"Up the 'Pool" (Early Version) (Stereo Mix)	3:13
37.	"Wond'ring Aloud, Again" (Stereo Mix)	7:08
38.	"Life is a Long Song" (Stereo Mix)	3:20
39.	"Up the 'Pool" (Stereo Mix)	3:13

DVD 2: Flat transfer of the original album and EP stereo and quadrophonic mixes and Life is a Long Song promotional film with new remixed stereo soundtrack
No.	Title	Length
1.	"Aqualung" (Original Stereo Mix)	6:38
2.	"Cross-Eyed Mary" (Original Stereo Mix)	4:11
3.	"Cheap Day Return" (Original Stereo Mix)	1:23
4.	"Mother Goose" (Original Stereo Mix)	3:53
5.	"Wond'ring Aloud" (Original Stereo Mix)	1:56
6.	"Up to Me" (Original Stereo Mix)	3:17
7.	"My God" (Original Stereo Mix)	7:13
8.	"Hymn 43" (Original Stereo Mix)	3:19
9.	"Slipstream" (Original Stereo Mix)	1:13
10.	"Locomotive Breath" (Original Stereo Mix)	4:42
11.	"Wind-Up" (Original Stereo Mix)	6:00
12.	"Aqualung" (Original Quadrophonic Mix)	6:38
13.	"Cross-Eyed Mary" (Original Quadrophonic Mix)	4:11
14.	"Cheap Day Return" (Original Quadrophonic Mix)	1:23
15.	"Mother Goose" (Original Quadrophonic Mix)	3:53
16.	"Wond'ring Aloud" (Original Quadrophonic Mix)	1:56
17.	"Up to Me" (Original Quadrophonic Mix)	3:17
18.	"My God" (Original Quadrophonic Mix)	7:13
19.	"Hymn 43" (Original Quadrophonic Mix)	3:19
20.	"Slipstream" (Original Quadrophonic Mix)	1:13
21.	"Locomotive Breath" (Original Quadrophonic Mix)	4:42
22.	"Wind-Up" (Original Quadrophonic Mix)	6:00
23.	"Life is a Long Song" (Original Stereo Mix)	3:21
24.	"Up the 'Pool" (Original Stereo Mix)	3:13
25.	"Dr. Bogenbroom" (Original Stereo Mix)	3:01
26.	"From Later" (Original Stereo Mix)	2:09
27.	"Nursie" (Original Stereo Mix)	1:38
28.	"Life is a Long Song promotional video"

=== Aqualung Live (2005) ===
Aqualung Live is a live album of a performance of Aqualung before an audience of 40 invited guests at XM Studios in Washington, D.C., on 23 November 2004. It was released in the UK in September 2005 by RandM Records. In the US, the album was given away to ticket holders on almost all US concerts in October and November 2005, before being given an official release on 7 March 2006. Royalties from the European release went to various charities for the homeless.

Track listing

All songs written by Ian Anderson

1. "Aqualung" – 7:56
2. "Cross-Eyed Mary" – 4:34
3. "Cheap Day Return" – 1:21
4. "Mother Goose" – 5:39
5. "Wond'ring Aloud" – 2:00
6. "Up to Me" – 3:35
7. "My God" – 8:27
8. "Hymn 43" – 4:22
9. "Slipstream" – 0:59
10. "Locomotive Breath" – 5:19
11. "Wind-Up" – 6:40
12. Riffs – Another Monkey – 1:27
13. Recording the Original – 2:05
14. Choosing My Words with Care – 1:17
15. Hummmmmm 43 – 0:35
16. A Different Kettle of Very Different Fish – 1:02
17. But is It Any Good? – 1:42

== Personnel ==
Jethro Tull

- Ian Anderson – lead vocals, acoustic guitar, flute, production
- Martin Barre – electric guitar, descant recorder
- John Evan – piano, organ, Mellotron
- Jeffrey Hammond (as "Jeffrey Hammond-Hammond") – bass guitar, alto recorder, odd voices; backing vocals on "Mother Goose"
- Clive Bunker – drums and percussion

Additional personnel

- Glenn Cornick – bass guitar (played with the band at rehearsals for the album in June 1970, some of which may have been recording sessions – particularly early versions of "My God" and "Wondring Again/Wondring Aloud" – although he is not credited on the album)
- John Burns – recording engineer
- Dee Palmer – orchestral arrangements and conducting
- Burton Silverman – album artwork
- Terry Ellis – producer

== Charts ==
Chart (1971)	Peak position
Australian Albums (Kent Music Report)	3
Canada Top Albums/CDs (RPM)	5
Danish Albums (Tracklisten)	3
Finnish Albums (The Official Finnish Charts)	6
German Albums (Offizielle Top 100)	5
Italian Albums (Musica e Dischi)	2
Norwegian Albums (VG-lista)	3
UK Albums (Official Charts)	4
US Billboard 200	7

Chart (1996–1997)	Peak position
German Albums (Offizielle Top 100)	44
UK Albums (Official Charts)	53
UK Rock & Metal Albums (Official Charts)	6

Chart (2016)	Peak position
Austrian Albums (Ö3 Austria)	60
Italian Albums (FIMI)	42
Scottish Albums (Official Charts)	37
Spanish Albums (Promusicae)	89
UK Albums (Official Charts)	76
UK Rock & Metal Albums (Official Charts)	2

== Certifications ==
Region	Certification	Certified units/sales
Australia (ARIA)	Gold	20,000^{^}
Germany (BVMI)	Gold	250,000^{^}
United Kingdom (BPI) 2011 release	Gold	100,000^{^}
United States (RIAA)	3× Platinum	3,000,000^{^}
^{^} Shipments figures based on certification alone.

== Footnotes ==
=== References ===
- Christgau, Robert (1981). Christgau's Record Guide: Rock Albums of the Seventies. Ticknor & Fields. ISBN 0-89919-025-1.
- Covach, John; Spicer, Mark (2010). Sounding Out Pop: Analytical Essays in Popular Music. University of Michigan Press. ISBN 978-0-472-03400-0.
- DeRogatis, Jim (2003). Turn on your mind: four decades of great psychedelic rock. Hal Leonard Corporation. ISBN 978-0-634-05548-5.
- Letts, Marianne Tatom (2010). Radiohead and the Resistant Concept Album: How to Disappear Completely. Indiana University Press. ISBN 978-0-253-22272-5.
- Moore, Allan (2004). Jethro Tull's Aqualung. Bloomsbury Publishing. ISBN 978-1-4411-7400-0.
- Nollen, Scott Allen (2001). Jethro Tull: a history of the band, 1968–2001. McFarland & Company. ISBN 978-0-7864-1101-6.
- Stump, Paul (1997). The Music's All that Matters: A History of Progressive Rock. Quartet Books Limited. ISBN 0-7043-8036-6.
