= Dee Palmer =

English composer, arranger, and musician (1937–2026)

Background information
- Born: David Palmer; 2 July 1937; Hendon, London, England
- Died: 13 June 2026 (aged 88) Shropshire, England
- Genres: Rock; soundtrack; modern classical
- Occupations: Arranger; musician
- Instruments: Keyboards; clarinet
- Years active: 1967–2026
- Label: Chrysalis
- Formerly of: Jethro Tull
- Website: missdeepalmer.com

Dee Palmer (formerly David Palmer; 2 July 1937 – 13 June 2026) was an English composer, arranger and keyboardist, best known for having been a member of the progressive rock group Jethro Tull from 1976 to 1980 (although she had worked with the band as an arranger since their inception in 1967).

== Early life and career ==
Palmer was born in Hendon, London, on 2 July 1937. She later studied composition at the Royal Academy of Music with Richard Rodney Bennett, winning the Eric Coates Prize and The Boosey and Hawkes Prize, and during her studentship taught clarinet to second-study students.

She was appointed a Fellow of the Royal Academy of Music in 1994.

== Jethro Tull ==
Going about her early career as a jobbing arranger and conductor of recording sessions, Palmer recorded her first album project, Nicola, in 1967 with Bert Jansch. She was then referred to Terry Ellis, then manager of the early Jethro Tull, who were recording their first album at Sound Techniques Studio in Chelsea, London. At short notice, Palmer came up with arrangements for the horns and strings on the Mick Abrahams song, "Move on Alone" from the This Was album. This work and professional performance endeared her to the band and she was soon to visit them again, with a string quartet arrangement to "A Christmas Song". Palmer arranged string, brass, and woodwind parts for Jethro Tull songs in the late 1960s and early 1970s, and was an arranger for the 1969 Stand Up album, before formally joining the group in 1976 and primarily playing electronic keyboard instruments.

In 1980, leader Ian Anderson intended to release the album A with other musicians as a solo project, but was persuaded by his record label to release it instead under the Jethro Tull name. This resulted in every member of the group, including Palmer, leaving except guitarist Martin Barre and Anderson himself. Palmer formed a new group, Tallis, with former Jethro Tull pianist and organist John Evan. The new group was not commercially successful, and Palmer returned to film scoring and sessions.

== Solo work ==
Beginning in the 1980s, Palmer produced several albums of orchestral arrangements of the music of various rock groups, including Jethro Tull, Pink Floyd, Genesis, Yes, the Beatles and Queen.

In 2017, Palmer announced the release of her debut and sole solo studio album, Through Darkened Glass, which was released in January 2018 and has the guest appearance of former band-mate Martin Barre.

In August 2019, Palmer appeared, alongside Barre, at Fairport's Cropredy Convention.

== Personal life and death ==
In 1998, Palmer came out as transgender and intersex, changing her name to Dee. Palmer was born with genital ambiguity, assigned male at birth, and underwent several surgeries, the last in her late twenties. Palmer said her gender dysphoria had been a part of her life since she had been young, and that the dysphoria "started to reassert itself again" in the year following the death of her wife Maggie in 1995.

Palmer moved to Knighton, on the English-Welsh border in Shropshire, in 2014. She was autistic.

Palmer's death at a hospice in Shropshire, aged 88, was announced on 13 June 2026.

== Discography ==
=== Solo ===
- Through Darkened Glass (2018)

=== With Jethro Tull ===
==== Providing orchestral arrangements ====
- This Was (1968)
- Stand Up (1969)
- Benefit (1970)
- Aqualung (1971)
- Thick as a Brick (1972)
- A Passion Play (1973)
- War Child (1974)
- Minstrel in the Gallery (1975)
- Too Old to Rock 'n' Roll: Too Young to Die! (1976)

==== As a full-time member ====
- Songs from the Wood (1977)
- Heavy Horses (1978)
- Bursting Out (1978 live album)
- Stormwatch (1979)
- Nightcap: The Unreleased Masters 1973–1991 (1993)
- Live at Madison Square Garden 1978 (2009 DVD)

=== Symphonic arrangements ===
- A Classic Case, also known as Classic Jethro Tull (1985)
- We Know What We Like: The Music of Genesis (the London Symphony Orchestra with David Palmer) (1987)
- Objects of Fantasy: The Music of Pink Floyd (1989) (re-issued in 2006 as "Orchestral Maneuvers")
- Symphonic Music of Yes, London Philharmonic Orchestra with Steve Howe and Bill Bruford (1993)
- Orchestral Sgt. Pepper's (version of The Beatles' album Sgt. Pepper's Lonely Hearts Club Band) (1994)
- Passing Open Windows: A Symphonic Tribute to Queen (1996)
- Norske popklassikere (the London Symphony Orchestra with David Palmer) (1996)
