= Locomotive Breath =

Single by Jethro Tull

from the album Aqualung
- B-side: "Wind Up" (1971) "Fat Man" (1976)
- Released: 30 March 1971 (Europe): December 1971 (US)
- Recorded: December 1970 – February 1971
- Studio: Island, London
- Genre: Progressive rock; hard rock; blues rock
- Length: 4:23; 3:05 (single)
- Label: Reprise (original US); Chrysalis/Capitol (US re-issue)
- Songwriter: Ian Anderson
- Producers: Ian Anderson; Terry Ellis

Jethro Tull singles chronology
"Hymn 43" (1971)	"Locomotive Breath" (1971)	"Life Is a Long Song" (1971)

Jethro Tull singles chronology
"Minstrel in the Gallery" (1975)	"Locomotive Breath" (1976)	"Too Old to Rock 'n' Roll: Too Young to Die" (1976)

"Locomotive Breath" is a song by British progressive rock band Jethro Tull from their 1971 album, Aqualung.

Written as a comment on population growth, "Locomotive Breath" was meant to replicate the chugging rhythm of a train. In addition to its release on Aqualung, "Locomotive Breath" saw two different single releases and has been a live favourite. It is one of Jethro Tull's best-known songs.

== Background ==
Lyrically, "Locomotive Breath" was inspired by band leader Ian Anderson's concern about overpopulation. He explained:

"It was my first song that was perhaps on a topic that would be a little more appropriate to today's world. It was about the runaway train of population growth and capitalism, it was based on those sorts of unstoppable ideas. We're on this crazy train, we can't get off it. Where is it going? Bearing in mind, of course, when I was born in 1947, the population of planet earth was slightly less than a third of what it is today, so it should be a sobering thought that in one man's lifetime, our planetary population has more than tripled. You'd think population growth would have brought prosperity, happiness, food and a reasonable spread of wealth, but quite the opposite has happened. And is happening even more to this day. Without putting it into too much literal detail, that was what lay behind that song."

The song additionally features a train motif that Anderson has employed on many songs. Anderson later said, "Train songs have been with us ever since the blues began, and I have written my fair share of these. I keep being drawn back to the subject, because public transport is part of my life. I don't drive, so rely on buses, trains and the like."

== Composition ==
"Locomotive Breath" was recorded via overdubs; most of the parts of the song were recorded separately. Ian Anderson did his normal flute and vocal parts in addition to bass drum, hi-hat, acoustic guitar and some electric guitar parts. John Evan's piano parts were then recorded; Clive Bunker added the rest of the drums and Martin Barre finished the electric guitar parts. All of these recordings were then overdubbed onto each other because Anderson was finding it difficult to communicate his musical ideas about the song to the other band members. The song was designed to replicate the chugging of a train in its rhythm.

Anderson explained the recording process of the song in an interview, saying "'Locomotive Breath' was actually an utter failure when we tried to play it all together. It didn't gel. We didn't get the groove. I think John Evan recorded the piano intro, then I went out into the studio with two drum sticks and clicked them together because this was in the days before click tracks, and then I went out and played to [that] with a hi-hat and bass drum. Then Clive [Bunker] went out and added the tom-toms and the cymbals. And then I played the electric-guitar rhythm part all the way through. And then we had something that was beginning to sound a bit like a song and it had that kind of metronomic feel, which I wanted it to have, because it's about a railway train running on the tracks. So it should click-clack in time."

The song has been Jethro Tull's live encore during concerts since 1972. During some live concerts, the song would segue into the finale of Pomp and Circumstance, usually to end the concert, or an encore.

== Release ==
"Locomotive Breath" was released on Jethro Tull's 1971 album Aqualung in 1971. A censored edit of the song was released in the US as a single in 1971, backed with "Wind-Up", though it did not chart. A 1976 single release of the song, backed with "Fat Man", was more successful, reaching number 59 on the Billboard charts and number 85 in Canada. The song was also released as the B-side to "Hymn 43". Since its initial releases, the song has appeared on multiple compilation and live albums, including Living in the Past, M.U. - The Best of Jethro Tull, and Bursting Out. The song receives frequent airplay on classic rock radio stations.

Ian Anderson ranked "Locomotive Breath" as one of his top 10 Jethro Tull songs. Billboard regarded the song to be Jethro Tull's best purely rock song in some time, saying that it had a similar theme and feel to "Aqualung." Cash Box praised the "incredible flute work from Ian Anderson." Ultimate Classic Rock named the song Jethro Tull's third best, saying, "This tune covers the length and breadth of Anderson’s songwriting talents, beginning with a bluesy John Evan piano intro so discreet one can barely hear it at times, before crashing into some of the most bombastic hard rock display of the band’s career." The song was ranked the fourth best Jethro Tull song by Rock – Das Gesamtwerk der größten Rock-Acts im Check.

== Personnel ==
- Ian Anderson – flute, lead vocals, bass drum, hi-hat, acoustic guitar, electric guitar
- John Evan – piano
- Martin Barre – electric guitar
- Jeffrey Hammond – bass guitar
- Clive Bunker – drums
