= Thick as a Brick =

- The original LP cover; its gatefold opens up as a 12-page newspaper

Studio album by Jethro Tull
- Released: 3 March 1972
- Recorded: December 1971
- Studios: Morgan, London
- Genre: Progressive rock
- Length: 43:46
- Labels: Chrysalis (Europe); Reprise (America, Japan and Oceania)
- Producer: Ian Anderson

Jethro Tull chronology
Aqualung (1971)	Thick as a Brick (1972)	Living in the Past (1972)

Thick as a Brick is the fifth studio album by the British rock band Jethro Tull, released on 3 March 1972 on Chrysalis Records. The album consists of a single continuous piece of music, split across the two sides of the original LP record, and was conceived as a parody of concept albums and the progressive rock genre. Its original packaging took the form of a 12-page newspaper, which presented the album as a musical adaptation of an epic poem by a fictional eight-year-old prodigy named Gerald Bostock, although the lyrics were actually written by the band's frontman Ian Anderson.

The album was recorded in late 1971, featuring music composed by Anderson and arranged with contributions from all band members. It marked the first appearance of drummer Barrie "Barriemore" Barlow, who replaced the band's previous drummer Clive Bunker. Musically, Thick as a Brick features an intricate suite of progressive rock, characterized by complex musical structures and frequent time signature changes, incorporating elements of art rock, folk and classical music. The album's lyrics draw partly on Anderson's childhood experiences and explore coming-of-age themes including conformity and intergenerational conflict, reflecting anti-establishment perspectives on institutions and authority. The album was promoted with a 1972–1973 world tour during which the band performed the full album live, incorporating theatrical elements and comic interludes.

Upon release, Thick as a Brick received mixed reviews from critics but achieved significant commercial success, becoming the band's first album to reach number one on the US Billboard 200. Today it is regarded as a classic of progressive rock and has received several accolades. Although intended as a parody of the genre, Jethro Tull continued to pursue a progressive rock style throughout the rest of their career, including repeating the continuous album concept for their next studio album A Passion Play (1973). In 2012, Anderson released Thick as a Brick 2, a follow-up album exploring the adult life of the fictional Gerald Bostock, issued as an Anderson solo album rather than under the Jethro Tull name.

== Background ==
Jethro Tull's frontman and songwriter Ian Anderson was infuriated when critics called the band's previous album, Aqualung (1971), a "concept album". He rejected this, thinking it was simply a collection of songs, so in response decided to "come up with something that really is the mother of all concept albums". Taking the surreal British humour of Monty Python as an influence, he began to write a piece that would combine complex music with a sense of humour, with the idea it would poke light-hearted fun at the band, the audience, and the music critics. He also intended to satirise the progressive rock genre that was popular at the time. His wife Jennie was also an inspiration, to whom he credited having devised the character and lyrics of "Aqualung". She had written a letter to Anderson while he was away touring the album, ten lines from which Anderson used as inspiration for the new material.

Anderson has also said that "the album was a spoof to the albums of Yes and Emerson, Lake & Palmer, much like what the movie Airplane! had been to Airport" and later remarked that it was a "bit of a satire about the whole concept of grand rock-based concept albums". Although Anderson wrote all the music and lyrics, he co-credited the writing to a fictional schoolboy named Gerald Bostock. The humour was subtle enough that some fans believed that Bostock was real. Reviewing the 40th anniversary reissue, Noel Murray suggested that many listeners of the original album "missed the joke".

== Recording ==
The group ran through two weeks of rehearsals using the Rolling Stones' basement studio in Bermondsey. They had not intended to record a single continuous piece; the band came up with individual song segments, then decided to write short pieces of music to link them together.

Recording started in December 1971 at Morgan Studios, London. Unlike previous albums, where Anderson had generally written songs in advance, only the initial section of the album had been worked out when the band went into the studio. The remainder of the suite was written during the recording sessions. To compensate for a lack of material, Anderson began work early each morning to prepare music for the rest of the band to learn during that day's session. The lyrics were written first, with the music constructed to fit around them. Anderson recalls the album took about two weeks to record and another two or three for overdubs and mixing. The final work spanned the entire length of an LP record, split over two sides.

The group remembered the recording being a happy process, with a strong feeling of camaraderie and fun, with numerous practical jokes. They were fans of Monty Python, and this style of humour influenced the lyrics and overall concept. Guitarist Martin Barre recalls the whole band coming up with various ideas for the music. Some parts were recorded in a single take with every member having an input, including significant contributions from keyboardist John Evan.

== Music ==
The concept may have been audacious, but the music is beyond belief: this is among the handful of holy grails for progressive rock fanatics, no questions asked. If Aqualung doubled down on the “concept album” concept, Thick as a Brick functioned as a New Testament of sorts, signifying what was now possible in rock music.

— Sean Murphy of Pop Matters (March 7, 2023)

Thick as a Brick was viewed by some critics as Jethro Tull's first progressive rock album. The album has a variety of musical themes, time signature changes and tempo shifts – all of which were features of the progressive rock scene. Although the finished album runs as one continuous piece, it is made up of a medley of individual songs that run into each other, none of which individually lasts more than 3–5 minutes. Parts of the suite blend classical and folk music into the typical rock music framework.

The album prominently features flute, acoustic and electric guitars and Hammond organ, which had been used previously, but the instrumentation also includes harpsichord, glockenspiel, timpani, violin, lute, trumpet, saxophone, and a string section—all uncommon in the band's earlier blues-inspired rock. Anderson later said that the lyrics were partly derived from his own childhood experiences, though the overall theme was Bostock's attempt to make sense of life from his point of view.

== Artwork ==
The original LP cover was designed as a spoof of a 12-by-16-inch (300 mm × 410 mm) 12-page small-town English newspaper, entitled The St. Cleve Chronicle and Linwell Advertiser, with articles, competitions and advertisements lampooning the typical parochial and amateurish journalism of the local English press. The band's record company, Chrysalis Records, complained that the sleeve would be too expensive to produce, but Anderson countered that if a real newspaper could be produced, a parody of one was also practicable.

The mock newspaper, dated 7 January 1972, also includes the entire lyrics to "Thick as a Brick" (printed on page 7), which is presented as a poem written by Bostock, whose disqualification from a poetry contest is the focus of the front-page story. This article claims that although Bostock initially won the contest, the judges' decision was repealed after protests and threats concerning the offensive nature of the poem, along with the boy's suspected psychological instability. The front cover includes a piece where Bostock is accused without foundation of being the father of his 14-year-old friend Julia's child. The inside of the paper features a mock review by "Julian Stone-Mason BA", a pseudonym of Anderson.

The contents of the newspaper were written mostly by Anderson, bassist Jeffrey Hammond and keyboardist John Evan. While some of the pieces were obviously silly, such as "Magistrate Fines himself", there was a lengthy story entitled "Do Not See Me Rabbit" about a pilot in the Battle of Britain being shot down by a Messerschmitt Bf 109. The overall layout was designed by Chrysalis' Roy Eldridge, who had previously worked as a journalist. Most of the characters in the newspaper were members of the band, their management, road crew, or colleagues; for instance, recording engineer Robin Black played a local roller-skating champion. Anderson recalls that the cover took longer to produce than the music.

The satirical newspaper was heavily abridged for conventional CD booklets, but the 25th Anniversary Special Edition CD cover is closer to the original, and the 40th anniversary boxed version contains most of the content from the original newspaper.

== Live performances ==
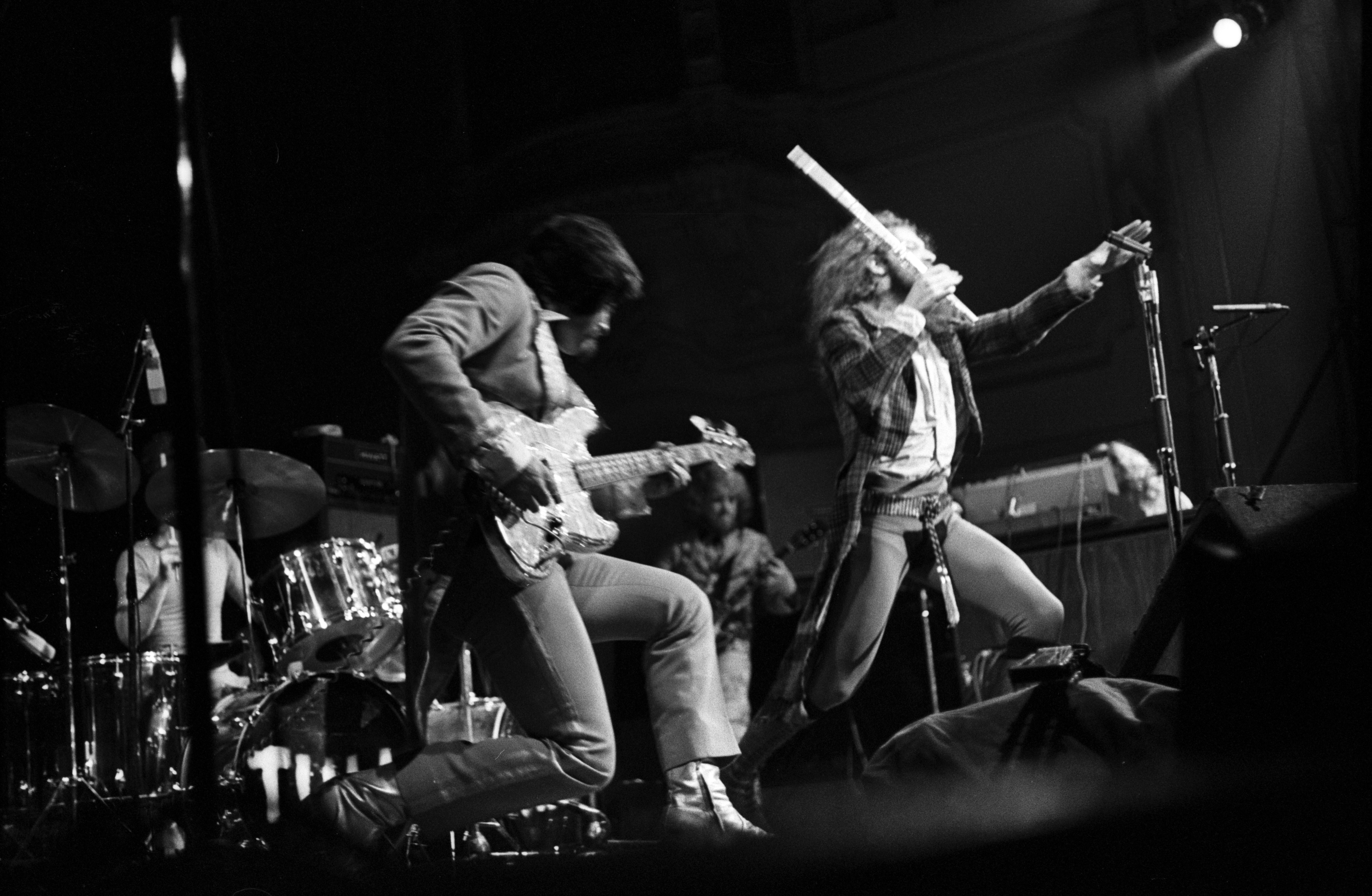
Jethro Tull on the Thick as a Brick tour, early 1973

Following the album's release, the band set out on tour, playing the entire piece with some extra musical additions that extended performances to over an hour. At the start of the show, men wearing capes appeared onstage and began sweeping the floor, counting the audience and studying the venue; after a few minutes, some of them revealed themselves to be members of the band and began to play. During some shows, the entire band stopped mid-performance when a telephone rang on stage, which Anderson would answer, before carrying on performing. News and weather reports were read halfway through the show, and a man in a scuba diver outfit came onstage. The tour's humour caused problems in Japan, where audiences responded to the changes with bewilderment. Barre recalls these first live performances being "a terrible experience" as there was a lot of complex music with a variety of time signature changes to remember.

Anderson performed the entire album live on tour in 2012, the first complete performances since the original tour. In August 2014, Anderson released the CD/DVD/Blu-ray Thick as a Brick – Live in Iceland. The concert was recorded in Reykjavík, Iceland, on 22 June 2012, and featured complete Thick as a Brick and Thick as a Brick 2 performances by the Ian Anderson Touring Band. Some of the humour and stage antics were maintained—especially the telephone ringing in the middle of a song, which was replaced by a cell phone and a Skype call.

== Critical reception ==
Professional ratings
Review scores
Source	Rating
AllMusic	4.5/5 stars
Christgau's Record Guide	C−
The Daily Vault	A
The Encyclopedia of Popular Music	3/5 stars
Musichound Rock: The Essential Album Guide	4.5/5 stars
Record Collector	4/5 stars
The Rolling Stone Album Guide	4/5 stars

Thick as a Brick was originally scheduled for release on 25 February 1972. Following production problems relating to the 1972 miners' strike, it was held back a week to 3 March. The album reached the top 5 in the UK charts, and number one in Australia, Canada and the United States, where it was certified Gold.

Contemporary reviews were mixed. Chris Welch of Melody Maker praised the musicianship of the band and Anderson's flute playing, writing also that "the joke at the expense of a local newspaper wears thin rather rapidly, but should not detract from the obvious amount of thought and work that has gone into the production of Thick"; he described the music as a creative effort where "the ideas flow in super abundance" but that "needs time to absorb" and "heard out of context of their highly visual stage act ... does not have such immediate appeal". Tony Tyler in his review for New Musical Express generally appreciated the construction of the suites and the arrangements, but he had doubts about the album's possible success. He called Thick as a Brick "Jethro Tull's own stand-or-fall epic after the lines of Tommy" and "an assault on the mediocrity and harshness of lower-middle-class existence in '70s Britain". Ben Gerson in Rolling Stone magazine called Thick as a Brick "one of rock's most sophisticated and ground-breaking products". Going further, the reviewer stated: "Martin Barre's guitar and John Evan's keyboards especially shine, and Ian's singing is no longer abrasive. Whether or not Thick As A Brick is an isolated experiment, it is nice to know that someone in rock has ambitions beyond the four- or five-minute conventional track, and has the intelligence to carry out his intentions, in all their intricacy, with considerable grace." Rolling Stone's Alan Niester gave it 2 out of 5 stars in The Rolling Stone Record Guide, judging it had "relatively undifferentiated movements". Village Voice critic Robert Christgau disliked the album, calling it "the usual shit" from the band: "rock (getting heavier), folk (getting feyer), classical (getting schlockier), flute (getting better because it has no choice)".

Retrospective reviews have been positive. AllMusic wrote that "Jethro Tull's first LP-length epic is a masterpiece in the annals of progressive rock, and one of the few works of its kind that still holds up decades later." Jordan Blum of PopMatters thinks that the album "paved the way for modern progressive rock" and "today, it represents not only a pinnacle achievement for Jethro Tull, but also a concrete example of just how adventurous and free artists used to be." Record Collector's reviewer writes that "today, free from the irrelevant context of misdiagnosis and derision that dogged it on its original release, the album sounds like nothing less than an Olympian feat of composition and musicianship." According to Modern Drummer reviewer Adam Budofsky, "that it remains so elevated in progressive rock fans' hearts and minds forty years later is a testament to its quality." Paul Stump's History of Progressive Rock commented of the album, "The 'concept', a somewhat self-conscious and mannered lionization of individual genius ... against caricatured bourgeois Philistinism, scarcely sees the light of day through the thickets of Anderson's imagery, but this doesn't detract from what, in hindsight, is quite a respectable, if periodically water-treading, stab at advanced extensional technique."

In 2014, Prog magazine listed Thick as a Brick at number 5 in the list "The 100 Greatest Prog Albums of All Time", voted for by its readers. Rolling Stone listed the album at number 7 in their "Top 50 Prog Albums of All Time". Rush's Geddy Lee has said Thick as a Brick is one of his favourite albums, as has Iron Maiden's Steve Harris.

In 2023, John Cunningham of WhatCulture wrote: "The greatest parody of prog rock ever recorded, Jethro Tull's 1972 LP was a refreshing prank in a mostly serious and complicated music scene."

== Reissues ==
The album has been reissued on CD several times: the first CD release (1985), the MFSL-release (1989), the 25th Anniversary Edition (1997), and the 40th Anniversary Edition (2012).

The 40th Anniversary Edition was released in November 2012, and includes a CD, a DVD, and a book. The CD contains a new mix of the album. The DVD contains a 5.1 surround sound mix (in DTS and Dolby Digital), the new stereo mix in high resolution, and the original stereo mix in high resolution. The first pressing of the DVD/CD box contained a faulty DVD with significant audio errors. A corrected replacement edition was issued later, with only a horizontal line beneath the "album duration" note on the disc label to identify it. The album was also re-released on vinyl at the same time. This edition lists part one at 22:45 and part two at 21:07.

For the 50th anniversary, a new vinyl pressing of the Wilson remix, mastered at half speed, was released with the original newspaper cover.

== Track listing ==
Section names from the downloadable version of the 40th anniversary edition.

All lyrics are written by "Gerald Bostock" (Ian Anderson); all music is composed by Anderson.

Side one
No.	Title	Length
1.	"Thick as a Brick": "Really Don't Mind" / "See There a Son Is Born" (5:00); "The Poet and the Painter" (5:29); "What Do You Do When the Old Man's Gone?" / "From the Upper Class" (5:25); "You Curl Your Toes in Fun" / "Childhood Heroes" / "Stabs Instrumental" (6:48)	22:40

Side two
No.	Title	Length
2.	"Thick as a Brick": "See There a Man Is Born" / "Clear White Circles" (5:58); "Legends and Believe in the Day" (6:34); "Tales of Your Life" (5:24); "Childhood Heroes Reprise" (2:56)	21:06
Total length:		43:46

25th Anniversary Edition bonus tracks
No.	Title	Length
3.	"Thick as a Brick" (1978 live version at Madison Square Garden)	11:50
4.	"Interview with Jethro Tull" (Ian Anderson, Martin Barre and Jeffrey Hammond)	16:30

2012 40th Anniversary Special Collector's Edition, CD Side: Steven Wilson stereo remix of the album
No.	Title	Length
1.	"Thick as a Brick (Part I)"	22:44
2.	"Thick as a Brick (Part II)"	20:54

2012 40th Anniversary Special Collector's Edition, DVD Side: Steven Wilson 5.1 surround and stereo remixes, flat transfer of the original stereo mix of the album, 1972 radio ad
No.	Title	Length
1.	"Thick as a Brick (Part I)" (5.1 Surround Mix)	22:44
2.	"Thick as a Brick (Part II)" (5.1 Surround Mix)	20:54
3.	"Thick as a Brick (Part I)" (2012 Stereo Mix)	22:44
4.	"Thick as a Brick (Part II)" (2012 Stereo Mix)	20:54
5.	"Thick as a Brick (Part I)" (Original Stereo Mix)	22:44
6.	"Thick as a Brick (Part II)" (Original Stereo Mix)	20:54
7.	"1972 Radio Ad"	1:02

== Personnel ==
Taken from the sleeve notes.

Jethro Tull

- Ian Anderson – vocals, acoustic guitar, flute, violin, trumpet, saxophone, producer
- Martin Barre – electric guitar, lute, flute
- John Evan – piano, organ, harpsichord
- Jeffrey Hammond (as "Jeffrey Hammond-Hammond") – bass guitar, spoken word
- Barriemore Barlow – drums, percussion, timpani

Additional personnel

- Dee Palmer – orchestral arrangements
- Terry Ellis – executive producer
- Robin Black – engineer

== Charts ==
=== Weekly charts ===
Chart (1972)	Peak position
Australian Albums (Kent Music Report)	1
Canada Top Albums/CDs (RPM)	1
Dutch Albums (Album Top 100)	3
Finnish Albums (The Official Finnish Charts)	4
German Albums (Offizielle Top 100)	4
Italian Albums (Musica e Dischi)	2
Norwegian Albums (VG-lista)	3
UK Albums (Official Charts)	5
US Billboard 200	1

Chart (2012)	Peak position
Belgian Albums (Ultratop Wallonia)	132
Italian Albums (FIMI)	77

Chart (2022)	Peak position
Scottish Albums (Official Charts)	23
Swiss Albums (Schweizer Hitparade)	70
UK Rock & Metal Albums (Official Charts)	2

=== Year-end charts ===
Chart (1972)	Position
German Albums (Offizielle Top 100)	26

== Certifications ==
Region	Certification	Certified units/sales
Australia (ARIA)	Gold	20,000^{^}
United States (RIAA)	Gold	500,000^{^}
^{^} Shipments figures based on certification alone.

== Covers and follow-ups ==
In 2012, Ian Anderson announced plans for a follow-up album, Thick as a Brick 2: Whatever Happened to Gerald Bostock?. According to the Jethro Tull website, the sequel is "a full length Progressive Rock 'concept' album worthy of its predecessor. Boy to man and beyond, it looks at what might have befallen the child poet Gerald Bostock in later life. Or, perhaps, any of us."

The follow-up album was released on 2 April 2012. It describes five different scenarios of Gerald Bostock's life, where he potentially becomes a greedy investment banker, a homeless homosexual man, a soldier in the Afghan War, a sanctimonious evangelist preacher, and a most ordinary man who runs a corner store and is married and childless. Thick as a Brick 2 lists 17 separate songs merged into 13 distinct tracks (some labelled as medleys), although also all flowing together much like a single song. To follow the style of the mock newspaper on the original Thick as a Brick, a mock online newspaper was set up.

While TAAB 2 was a follow-up about Gerald Bostock, the 2014 Ian Anderson solo album Homo Erraticus was presented as a follow-up work by Gerald Bostock. In the backstory Anderson created for the album, the now middle-aged Bostock came across an unpublished manuscript by one Ernest T. Parritt (1873–1928), entitled "Homo Britanicus Erraticus". Parritt was convinced he lived past lives as historical characters, and wrote detailed accounts of these lives in his work; he also wrote of fantasy imaginings of lives yet to come. Bostock then created lyrics based on Parritt's writings, while Anderson set them to music. As with the original Thick as a Brick, authorship of each song on this album is explicitly credited to both Anderson and Bostock.

Composer Richard Harvey has covered Thick as a Brick in the special compilation The Royal Philharmonic Orchestra Plays Prog Rock Classics.
