= John Evan =

British musician and composer

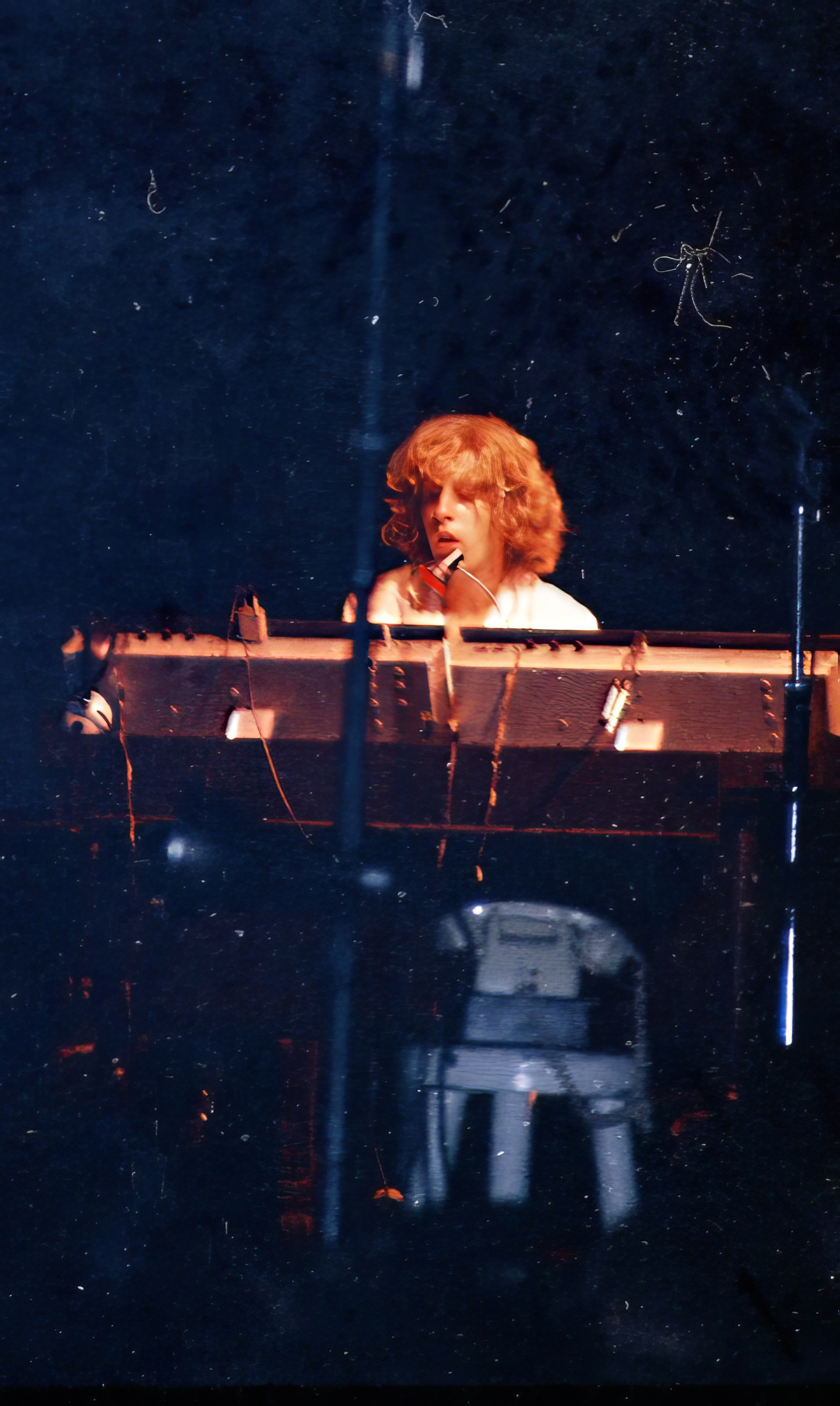
- John Evan in concert with Jethro Tull in 1973

Background information
- Also known as: John Evans
- Born: John Spencer Evans; 28 March 1948 (age 78); Blackpool, Lancashire, England
- Genre: Progressive rock
- Occupations: Musician; songwriter; record producer
- Instrument: Keyboards
- Years active: 1960s–present
- Labels: Chrysalis Records, A New Day Records
- Formerly of: Jethro Tull

John Evan (born John Spencer Evans; born 28 March 1948, in Derby, Derbyshire) is a British musician and composer. He is best known as the keyboardist for Jethro Tull from April 1970 to June 1980.

== Early life ==
Evans' father was headmaster at a Derbyshire village school and his mother was a local concert pianist and piano teacher. The family moved to Blackpool, Lancashire in October 1949. Evans was educated at Blackpool Grammar School, where he met Ian Anderson and Jeffrey Hammond, and at Chelsea College, now King's College London.

== Career ==
Evans changed his name when his first band, The Blades, changed their name to The John Evan Band. Jeffrey Hammond apparently thought 'The John Evan Band' sounded better than 'The John Evans Band'. He participated in the Blackpool musical scene, with most of the musicians that would become Jethro Tull, including Barrie Barlow, Jeffrey Hammond, Glenn Cornick and Ian Anderson.

Later on, Evan was attending college when he happened to recognize his then future bandmates on the radio with the song "Living in the Past", remarking years later that it stood out to him because of its quite unusual time signature for a pop song (5/4).

=== Jethro Tull ===
In 1970, he played as a session musician on Jethro Tull's Benefit album (where his acknowledgement reads: "...and John Evan, who played keyboards for our 'benefit'"), and was eventually convinced by Ian Anderson to leave school to join the group permanently. One of his first recordings as a full-time member was piano introduction to "Locomotive Breath", recorded while some of the other band members were out to lunch.

Whilst with Jethro Tull, Evan had a penchant for wearing his trademark white suit, along with a yellow shirt underneath and a pink-and-yellow polka-dot tie. Evan can be seen wearing this outfit in photographs on the album War Child, and the live album Bursting Out, while a painted version of him is seen wearing the suit and tie on the inside cover of the Aqualung album. During concerts, Evan's wildly rendered pantomime gestures would conjure visions for audiences of a cross between Harpo Marx and The Hatter from Alice's Adventures in Wonderland (sans the hat). Because of the familiar white suit, Anderson was known to refer to Evan jokingly (during band member introductions) as "everyone's favourite ice cream salesman".

== After Jethro Tull ==
Evan departed Jethro Tull in July 1980, with the "Big Split" of the band. He then went on to form Tallis with fellow departing Tull member, Dee Palmer. He appeared in the 2004 DVD Jethro Tull – A New Day Yesterday: The 25th Anniversary Collection (1969–1994) (originally released in 1994 on VHS), the 2008 DVD Jethro Tull – Their Fully Authorised Story (1968–2008), and the 2009 CD/DVD combo Jethro Tull – Live at Madison Square Garden (1978). In 2018, Evan appeared in a video segment, dressed as a flower, during Ian Anderson's Jethro Tull 50th Anniversary tour.

In his middle years Evan started a construction company and enjoyed long-distance bicycle touring and rallies in many parts of the world. Now he makes his home in Melbourne where he sings in local choirs but due to bicycle injuries to his hands can't play the piano.

== Album discography ==
=== With The John Evan Band ===
- Live 1966 (A New Day Records)

=== With Jethro Tull ===
Studio albums

- Benefit (1970 - as session musician)
- Aqualung (1971)
- Thick as a Brick (1972)
- A Passion Play (1973)
- War Child (1974)
- Minstrel in the Gallery (1975)
- Too Old to Rock 'n' Roll: Too Young to Die! (1976)
- Songs from the Wood (1977)
- Heavy Horses (1978)
- Stormwatch (1979)

Compilations

- Living in the Past (1972)
- 20 Years of Jethro Tull
- 25th Anniversary Box Set
- Nightcap

Live albums

- Bursting Out (1978)
- Nothing Is Easy: Live at the Isle of Wight 1970 (as session musician, released in 2004)
- Live at Carnegie Hall 1970 (as session musician, released in 2015)
- Live at Madison Square Garden 1978
