= Martin Barre =

British guitarist (born 1946)

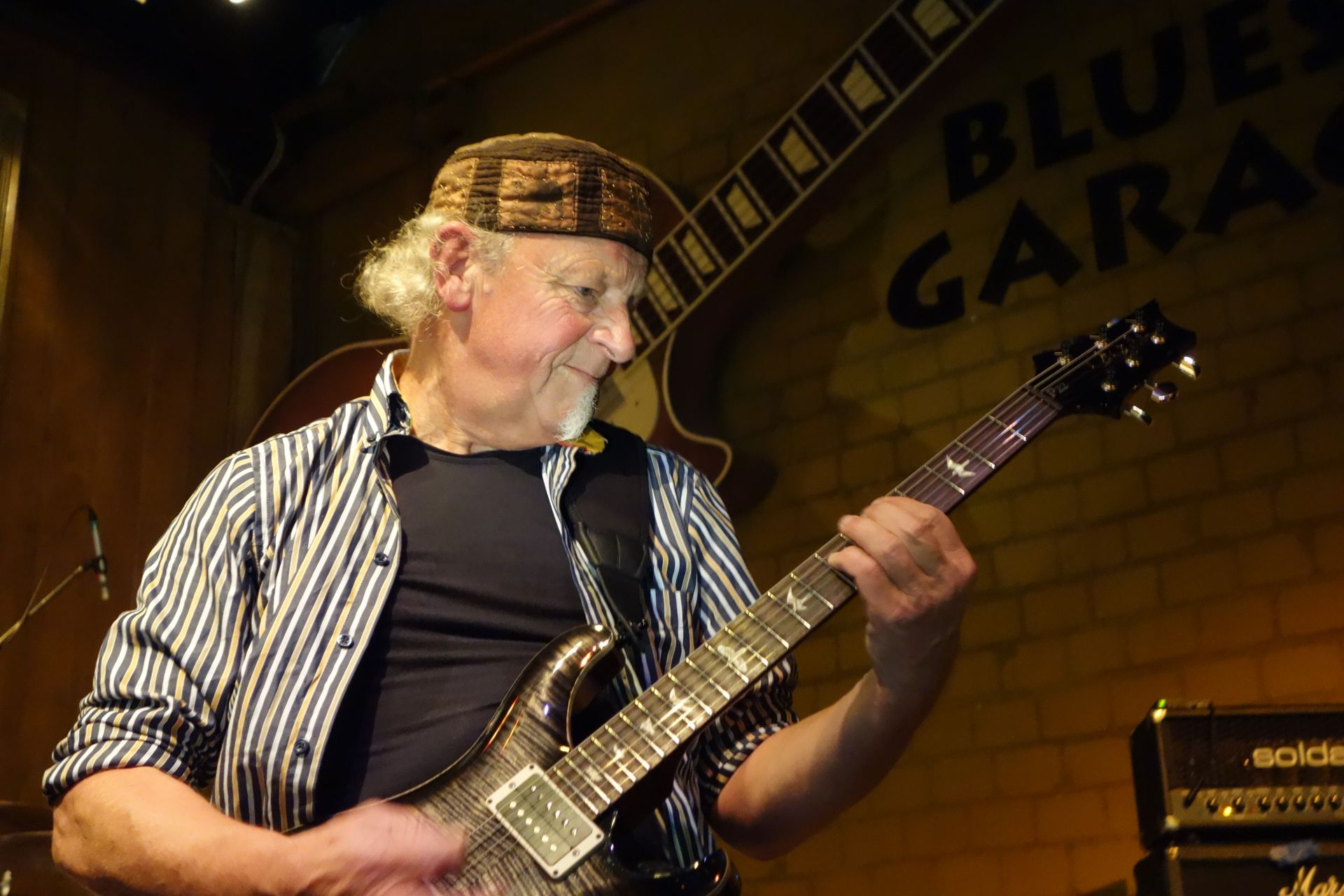
- Barre performing at Bluesgarage Isernhagen, Germany, in 2013

Background information
- Born: Martin Lancelot Barre; 17 November 1946 (age 80); Kings Heath, Birmingham, England
- Genres: Progressive rock; folk rock; hard rock
- Occupations: Musician; songwriter
- Instruments: Guitar; bouzouki; mandolin; flute; saxophone
- Years active: 1966–present
- Labels: RandM; Fuel 2000; Chrysalis; Eagle; Roadrunner; EMI; Capital; Island
- Formerly of: Jethro Tull
- Website: martinbarre.com

Martin Lancelot Barre (/bɑːr/; born 17 November 1946) is an English guitarist. He was lead guitarist of British rock band Jethro Tull, with whom he recorded and toured from 1968 until the band's initial dissolution in 2011. Barre played on all of Jethro Tull's studio albums from their 1969 album Stand Up (replacing Mick Abrahams, who played on their first album) to their 2003 album The Jethro Tull Christmas Album. He remains the longest-serving member of the band after founder and leader Ian Anderson. In the early 1990s, he began a solo career, and he has recorded several albums and has toured with his own live band.

He has also played the flute and other instruments such as the mandolin, both on stage for Jethro Tull and in his own solo work.

== Early career ==
Martin Barre was born in Kings Heath, Birmingham, England, on 17 November 1946. His father was an engineer, who had wanted to play the clarinet professionally. Barre played the flute at his grammar school. When Barre bought his first guitar, his father gave him albums by Barney Kessel, Johnny Smith, and Wes Montgomery to broaden his musical perspectives.

In college, he studied architecture at Lanchester Polytechnic (now Coventry University) for three years, but did not complete his studies after failing Spanish and atomic science, subjects that he found to have little to do with designing buildings. After designing a road junction in Birmingham, he decided that a career in architecture was too boring, and switched to music.

In 1966, he moved to London with his friend, Chris Rodger, who had played the saxophone in their previous band, the Moonrakers. In London, Barre and Rodger got an audition for a band called the Noblemen, who were looking for two saxophonists. Barre bought a tenor saxophone, and after two days' practice, he was able to bluff his way through the audition. The band subsequently changed its name to the Motivation, and backed visiting soul artists such as the Coasters, the Drifters, and Lee Dorsey. The band evolved through several musical styles, from soul to rhythm and blues to pop; in 1967, the band changed its name to the Penny Peeps. By this time, Barre was playing lead guitar. As the Penny Peeps, the band released two singles in 1968, "Little Man With a Stick" backed by "Model Village", and "I See the Morning" backed with "Curly, Knight of the Road". Finally, in mid-1968, they became a blues band named Gethsemane, and played in pubs all over England, with Barre playing the guitar and flute.

When Gethsemane and the band Jethro Tull played at a blues club called the Van Dyke in Plymouth, the members of the two bands got acquainted. Then, four months later, while Gethsemane was playing in London and about to break up because of lack of money, Jethro Tull's manager, Terry Ellis, sent his card up from the audience asking Barre to audition for Jethro Tull. The audition did not go well. Barre was so nervous that he barely played; however, he arranged a second audition. This time, he was offered the job. He spent the Christmas holidays of 1968 learning material that was to become the album Stand Up.

== Jethro Tull ==
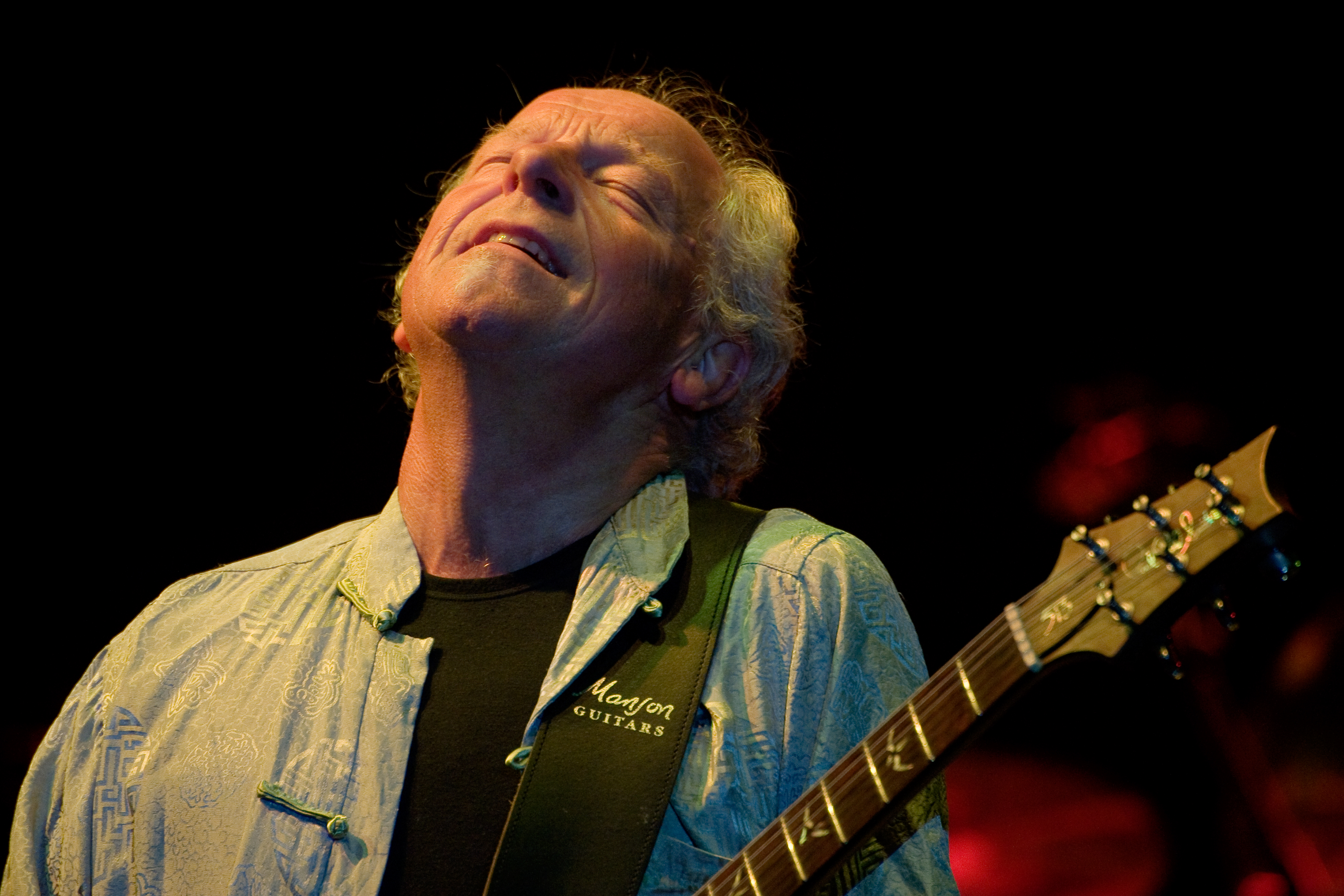
Barre performing with Jethro Tull in Genoa, 14 February 2010

On the first album that Barre recorded with Jethro Tull, Stand Up, he said that he was: "terrified because I had just joined the band. It really showed a change in direction for the band and when it was accepted and became a successful album, we gained a lot of confidence. We extended that confidence into the making of Benefit, in which we were a lot more at ease." On the next album, the world success Aqualung, Barre was more confident, stating that in the recording: "Everybody [the band] had input into the making of the album."

In the following period, his solos blended virtuosity with classical music, such as on Minstrel in the Gallery, where the opening track has a four-minute solo, or his piece (shared with Barrie Barlow) "Conundrum" and "Quatrain" on Bursting Out. Barre declared that much of the material from Jethro Tull catalogue was written by himself and Ian Anderson, with Anderson getting the credit for writing the lyrics and having the initial idea for the music: "then I, or someone else in the band, contribute parts to it." Two albums on which Barre is credited with having contributed "additional material", Songs from the Wood and Heavy Horses, are two of those which, he has stated, show his best playing.

Barre embraced the new Jethro Tull sound on the album Under Wraps (1984), despite its foregrounding of synthesisers and relegation of his own guitar work to the background. The album contains two tracks co-authored by him. On his work with Jethro Tull, Barre also stated: "I'm quite pleased with my playing on Crest of a Knave, which was basically me, Ian, and [bassist] Dave Pegg working in the studio for two months, so I had ample time to put a lot of myself into that album." He is credited on only three other Jethro Tull studio album tracks, the title track from Minstrel in the Gallery, "Hot Mango Flush" from J-Tull Dot Com, and "Winter Snowscape" from The Jethro Tull Christmas Album. Concerning his contribution to Jethro Tull music, Barre stated: "I've done bits and pieces on albums. Sometimes it's a riff; sometimes it's a little segment of music ... I don't mind taking a small role in the writing, and a larger input into the arrangement and playing."

About the end of his involvement in Tull, Barre stated in 2015, "It's important that people realize there will never be a Jethro Tull again. There will be two solo bands: the Ian Anderson Band and the Martin Barre Band, and long may they exist, and long may they enjoy playing music. I'm not being pedantic. I always hate to hear, 'Oh, you've left Jethro Tull.' I haven't really. Ian wanted to finish Jethro Tull, wanted to stop the band completely."

When Anderson reunited Jethro Tull in 2017 for their 50th-anniversary tour, Barre was not asked to return.

== Solo work ==
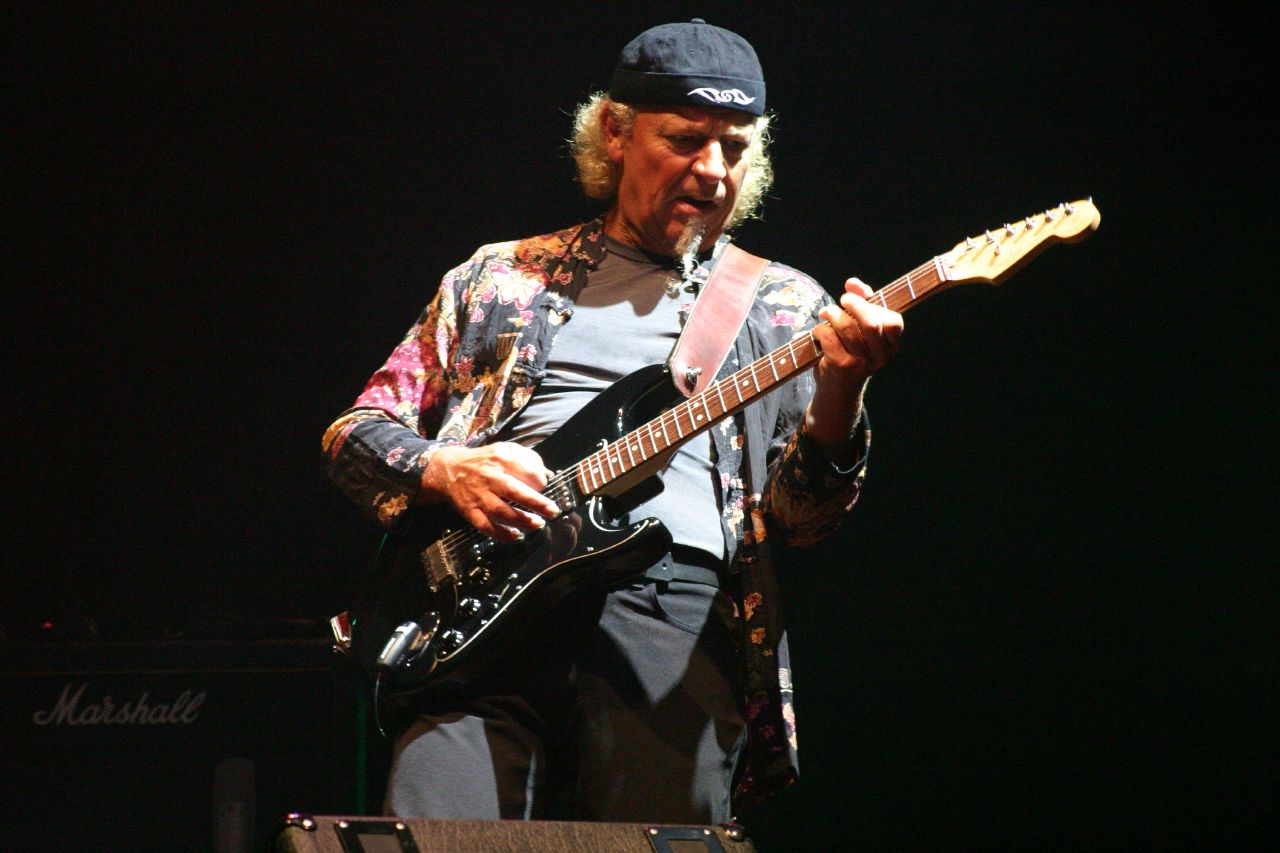
Barre performing at the Cropredy Festival, Oxfordshire, on 13 August 2004

On one track of 1994's A Trick of Memory, Barre plays a guitar given to him by friend Mark Mancina. On the album, King Crimson alumnus Mel Collins plays the saxophone, Fairport Convention's Maartin Allcock and Ric Sanders appear on a couple of tracks, and Andy Giddings plays keyboards. According to the AllMusic review: "the dominant sound is Barre's guitars, soaring, crunching, grinding, or noodling gently, either blues or English folk tunes"; to the reviewer, the album is "a decent debut album". A Summer Band was released only in limited edition.

In 2003, on his album Stage Left, Barre used an unusual electric guitar style shaped by folk/acoustic and hard-rock elements. It was his first album to be released in the United States. In the album, Barre shows his style of playing with "tricky and complicated" melodies, being always "elegant, even when he's rocking hard".

In 2012, with the end of Jethro Tull touring, Barre assembled a band to tour and record the compilation/live titled Martin Barre. The line-up included former Tull members Jonathan Noyce and Doane Perry (who split duties with drummer Fred Moreau), John Mitchell, and guitarist Pat O'May.

In 2014, Barre announced that he would tour as an acoustic quartet (including Dan Crisp and Alan Bray) to promote Away With Words, which was well received by Prog Magazine, saying that in the album, "Barre has taken an imaginative approach to his own past by readdressing many of his favourite, often more obscure, nuggets from Tull's [sic] vast cache, chiefly on acoustic guitar." Later in 2014, a new album was announced to be released that September, called Order of Play, which was a louder electric record.

Barre announced his sixth solo album in 2015. Called Back to Steel, Barre says the album is a blues rock recording. It was followed by Roads Less Travelled in 2018.

Martin Barre commenced a tour of the U.S. in the spring of 2019 to celebrate the 50th anniversary of his joining Jethro Tull and the release of Stand Up. On the tour, he was supported by his band consisting Alan Thomson (bass), Dan Crisp (guitar and vocals), and Darby Todd (drums), along with special guests (former Tull members) Dee Palmer on keyboards and Clive Bunker on drums. The band were completed with Ali Humphries and Becca Langsford on backing vocals. The show was presented with a full multimedia backing show provided by fans from the Jethro Tull Group. A new double-CD album release was available at the shows. MLB is a celebration of 50 years of Jethro Tull as arranged and performed by Martin, his band, and guests.

In August 2019, Barre appeared again at Fairport's Cropredy Convention.

For 2020, Barre had planned to celebrate 50 years of Jethro Tull music with a world tour. However, most shows were cancelled or rescheduled due to the global COVID-19 pandemic. Adam Wakeman, Clive Bunker, and Dee Palmer were scheduled to be guest musicians in several presentations.

== Playing style ==
Barre once said that he tried not to listen to other guitarists, so that he would not be influenced by them. He said he never took guitar lessons, so that he would not sound like other players. However, one guitarist he has praised and recognized as being an influence is Leslie West, from the American band Mountain.

Reviewers have sometimes described Martin Barre's sound as "tricky" and "complicated", highlighting his ability to compose melodies instead of simply soloing.

== Recognition ==
Barre's best-known guitar work includes that on the songs "Aqualung", "Cross-Eyed Mary", and "Locomotive Breath". His solo on "Aqualung" was voted by the readers of Guitar Player as one of the top rock guitar solos of all time. Also in 2007, this solo was rated one of the 100 Greatest Guitar Solos by Guitar World. Authors Pete Brown and HP Newquest named Barre's "Aqualung" solo as the 25th-best solo ever in the U.S. and 20th-best solo ever in the UK.

Dire Straits leader Mark Knopfler, in a 2005 interview, called Barre's work with Ian Anderson "magical". Joe Bonamassa cites Barre as a direct influence, especially in the blues playing of the early albums. Other guitarists, such as Steve Vai, Joe Satriani, and Eric Johnson, also cite Barre as influences. Rush's Geddy Lee mentions the "great guitar sounds" of Barre when remembering the album Thick as a Brick.

== Discography ==
For his discography with Jethro Tull, see main article: Jethro Tull discography

=== Studio ===
- A Trick of Memory (1994)
- The Meeting (1996)
- Stage Left (2003)
- Away with Words (2013)
- Order of Play (2014)
- Back to Steel (2015)
- Roads Less Travelled (2018)
- MLB - 50 Years of Jethro Tull (2019)

=== Compilations ===
- Martin Barre (2012) – 2 CD (disc 1 – studio tracks, disc 2 – live tracks).
- Rarities (2020) - 1 LP (studio and live tracks)

=== Live ===
- A Summer Band (1992) - Various live tracks originally released in a limited edition run of 500 CDs.
- Live in Munich (2014)
- Live at the Factory Underground (2019)
- Live in NY (2019) - 3 disc (1 DVD, 2 audio CD)
- Live At The Wildey (2021)

=== Guest appearances ===
- 1973 Chick Churchill (You and Me; also features Roger Hodgson and Rick Davies of Supertramp)
- 1978 Maddy Prior (Woman in the Wings)
- 1978 Dan Lowe (Fahrenheit 361)
- 1980 John Wetton (Caught in the Crossfire)
- 1981 5 Furious Fish (Just for the Halibut)
- 1987 Paul McCartney (Atlantic Ocean)
- 1997 Spirit of the West (Weights and Measures)
- 1997 John Carter (Spirit Flying Free)
- 1998 Clive Bunker (Awakenings)
- 1998 Willy Porter (Live)
- 1999 ELP Tribute (Encores, Legends and Paradox)
- 2001 Various artists incl. Steve Vai, Carlos Santana, Allan Holdsworth (Guitars for Freedom 9/11 charity)
- 2003 Vikki Clayton (Movers and Shakers)
- 2005 Pentangle (Feoffees' Lands)
- 2007 Dave Pegg (60th Birthday Bash)
- 2007 Excalibur 2
- 2010 Excalibur 3
- 2010 Chris Thompson, Gary Brooker, Frank Mead, Henry Spinetti, Dave Pegg (Live in Germany Classic Rock Tour)
- 2012 Pat O'May (Celtic Wings)
- 2015 Mick Abrahams (Revived!)
- 2018 Dee Palmer (Through Darkened Glass)
- 2022 Leo Carnicella (Super~Sargasso Sea)
