= Jeffrey Hammond =

British musician

Jeffrey Hammond-Hammond
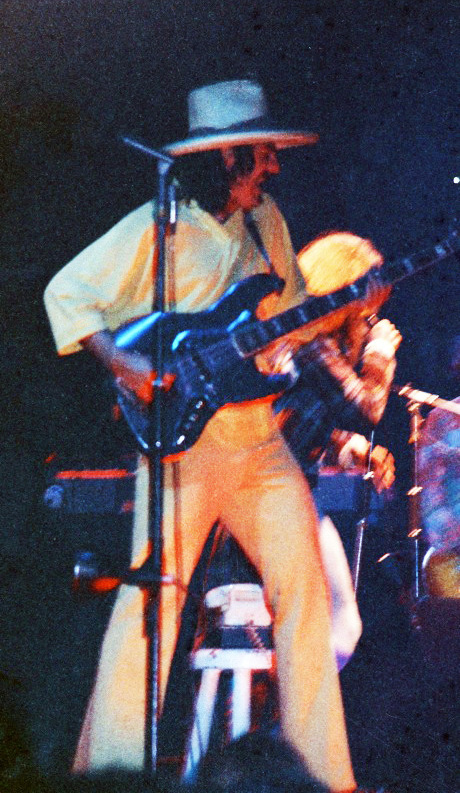
- Jeffrey Hammond in concert with Jethro Tull, 1973

Background information
- Born: Jeffrey Hammond; 30 July 1946 (age 80); Blackpool, Lancashire, England
- Genres: Progressive rock, Folk rock, Hard rock
- Occupation: Musician
- Instrument: Bass guitar
- Years active: 1970–75
- Formerly of: Jethro Tull

Jeffrey Hammond (born 30 July 1946), also known by his former stage name Jeffrey Hammond-Hammond, is an English artist and musician who was the bassist of progressive rock band Jethro Tull from 1970 to 1975. Hammond played on some of the band's most successful albums, including Aqualung (1971) and Thick as a Brick (1972).

Hammond adopted the name "Hammond-Hammond" as a joke, since both his father's surname and mother's maiden name were the same. He also joked in interviews that his mother defiantly chose to keep her maiden name, just like Eleanor Roosevelt.

== Jethro Tull ==
Hammond met Ian Anderson in grammar school and formed a band with him and future Jethro Tull members John Evan and Barriemore Barlow. After school, he gave up music and took up painting. Meanwhile, Anderson formed Jethro Tull and wrote several songs about his friend's idiosyncrasies, such as "A Song for Jeffrey" (on the album This Was), "Jeffrey Goes to Leicester Square" (Stand Up) and "For Michael Collins, Jeffrey and Me" (Benefit). Hammond is also mentioned in the lyrics of the Benefit track "Inside". In December 1970, when Glenn Cornick left the band, Anderson talked Hammond into joining Jethro Tull.

According to Anderson, it was Hammond who came up with a name for the "claghorn", a hybrid instrument Anderson made by attaching the mouthpiece from a saxophone and the bell of a toy trumpet to the body of a bamboo flute. The instrument can be heard on the track "Dharma for One" on the album This Was. According to Anderson, "clag" was a term Hammond used for feces, "so 'claghorn' presumably because it sounded shit!"

In addition to playing bass, he narrated the surreal piece "The Story of the Hare Who Lost His Spectacles" on the album A Passion Play. He also received credit, along with Anderson and Evan, for writing the piece. In a similar vein, he wrote and performed the words for "Sealion II", an alternate version of the WarChild song recorded during the same sessions as the album, which was first released on Nightcap in 1993 and later included on the 40th anniversary edition of WarChild.

During his time in Jethro Tull, Hammond wore a black-and-white-striped suit and played a matching bass guitar; He burned the suit in December 1975 upon his departure from the band. According to Ian Anderson's sleevenotes for the 2002 reissue of Tull's Minstrel in the Gallery, Hammond "returned to his first love, painting, and put down his bass guitar, never to play again." His replacement as bass player was John Glascock, a professional musician from the band Carmen.

Hammond has developed a second career as a landscape painter.

== Later musical appearances ==
Anderson approached Hammond about standing in for the ailing Glascock during Jethro Tull's fall 1978 U.S. tour, but after a rehearsal Hammond decided he was not up to the task, and Tony Williams took the job.

Hammond attended Jethro Tull's 25th anniversary reunion party in 1994. He participated in an interview, along with Ian Anderson and Martin Barre, that was featured as a bonus track on the 1997 reissue of Thick as a Brick.

== Discography ==
- Aqualung (1971)
- Thick as a Brick (1972)
- Living in the Past (compilation, 1972)
- A Passion Play (1973)
- War Child (1974)
- Minstrel in the Gallery (1975)
