= Original Masters =

Greatest hits album by Jethro Tull
- Released: October 1985
- Genre: Progressive rock
- Length: 53:48
- Label: Chrysalis

Jethro Tull chronology
A Classic Case (1985)	Original Masters (1985)	Crest of a Knave (1987)

Professional ratings
Review scores
Source	Rating
AllMusic	3/5 stars
The Encyclopedia of Popular Music	3/5 stars

Original Masters is a greatest hits album by Jethro Tull released under Chrysalis Records in 1985. It was the band's third such effort, the first two being M.U. – The Best of Jethro Tull (1969–1975, released 1976) and Repeat – The Best of Jethro Tull – Vol II (1969–1975, released 1977). Although the compilation was released in 1985, it does not include material released after 1977.

The first two compilations had material released exclusively up to 1977 and Original Masters covers much of that same material with a few extras.

The CD's back insert, as well as the back cover of the LP's sleeve, mislabels the song "The Witch's Promise" as "Witches Promise".

== Track listing ==
1. "Living in the Past" – 3:18 (released as a single, 1969)
2. "Aqualung" (M.U. remix) – 6:34 (original version released on Aqualung, 1971 - this mix first released on M.U. - The Best of Jethro Tull, 1975)
3. "Too Old to Rock 'n' Roll: Too Young to Die" – 5:38 (released on Too Old to Rock 'n' Roll: Too Young to Die!, 1976)
4. "Locomotive Breath" – 4:23 (released on Aqualung, 1971)
5. "Skating Away on the Thin Ice of the New Day" (intro edit) – 3:28 (released on War Child, 1974)
6. "Bungle in the Jungle" – 3:34 (released on War Child, 1974)
7. "Sweet Dream" – 4:01 (released as a single, 1969)
8. "Songs from the Wood" – 4:52 (released on Songs from the Wood, 1977)
9. "The Witch's Promise" – 3:47 (released as a single, 1970)
10. "Thick as a Brick" (Edit #1) – 3:00 (released as a single, in conjunction with Thick as a Brick, 1972 - this edit first released on M.U. - The Best of Jethro Tull, 1975)
11. "Minstrel in the Gallery" – 7:47 (released on Minstrel in the Gallery, 1975)
12. "Life's a Long Song" – 3:16 (released on Life Is a Long Song EP, 1971)

== Charts ==
Chart (1985)	Peak position
Australian Albums (Kent Music Report)	98
UK Albums (Official Charts)	63

== Certifications ==
Region	Certification	Certified units/sales
United Kingdom (BPI)	Silver	60,000^{^}
United States (RIAA)	Platinum	1,000,000^{^}
^{^} Shipments figures based on certification alone.
