= Essential (Jethro Tull album) =

"The Essential"

Greatest hits album by Jethro Tull
- Released: 24 March 2003 (UK; March 31, 2003 (U.S.)
- Genre: Progressive rock; hard rock
- Length: 43:41
- Label: Chrysalis
- Producer: Ian Anderson; Terry Ellis

Jethro Tull chronology
| Living with the Past (2002) | "The Essential" (2003) | The Jethro Tull Christmas Album (2003) |

Professional ratings
Review scores
| Source | Rating |
|---|---|
| The Encyclopedia of Popular Music | 3/5 stars |

The Essential (2003) is a greatest hits album by Jethro Tull, digitally remastered. The songs included and their order are the same as Tull's first greatest hits album, M.U. – The Best of Jethro Tull. It is not to be confused with the similarly named Jethro Tull compilation "Essential", released in 2011.

== Track listing ==
1. "Teacher" – 4:07
2. "Aqualung" – 6:34
3. "Thick as a Brick (Edit No.1)" – 3:01
4. "Bungle in the Jungle" – 3:34
5. "Locomotive Breath" – 4:23
6. "Fat Man" – 2:50
7. "Living in the Past" – 3:18
8. "A Passion Play Edit #8" – 3:28
9. "Skating Away on the Thin Ice of the New Day" – 4:02
10. "Rainbow Blues" – 3:37
11. "Nothing Is Easy" – 4:23

== Personnel ==
- Ian Anderson – flute, vocals, saxophone, acoustic guitar (all tracks)
- Martin Barre – electric guitar (all tracks)
- Glenn Cornick – bass (tracks 1, 7, 11)
- Clive Bunker – drums (tracks 1, 2, 5 – 7, 11)
- John Evan – Hammond organ, piano, synthesizers (tracks 1 – 5, 8 – 10 )
- Jeffrey Hammond – bass (tracks 2, 3, 4, 5, 8, 9, 10)
- Barriemore Barlow – drums, percussion, glockenspiel (tracks 3, 4, 8 – 10)
- David Palmer – orchestration, orchestra conducting
