= 20 Years of Jethro Tull =

Box set by Jethro Tull
- Released: (US) 21 June 1988 (UK) 27 June 1988
- Recorded: 1968–88
- Genre: Rock
- Length: 231:13
- Label: Chrysalis
- Producer: Ian Anderson

Jethro Tull chronology
Crest of a Knave (1987)	20 Years of Jethro Tull (1988)	20 Years of Jethro Tull: Highlights (1988)

Professional ratings
Review scores
Source	Rating
AllMusic	3/5 stars
The Encyclopedia of Popular Music	4/5 stars

20 Years of Jethro Tull is a 1988 boxed set which spans the first twenty years of Jethro Tull. It was issued as five LPs: Radio Archives, Rare Tracks, Flawed Gems, Other Sides of Tull, and The Essential Tull. It was simultaneously released as both a three CD and a three cassette set, titled 20 Years of Jethro Tull: The Definitive Collection.

All three versions were housed in a 12"x12" cardboard box, with a 24-page booklet; the CD and cassette versions having a black plastic tray.

A single CD sampler and a double LP album were also created, titled 20 Years of Jethro Tull: Highlights.

== Track listing ==
=== CD ===
All tracks are written by Ian Anderson unless noted.

Disc one - Radio Archives and Rare Tracks
No.	Title	Writer(s)	Length
1.	"A Song for Jeffrey" (live at the BBC, 22 September 1968)		2:51
2.	"Love Story" (live at the BBC, 5 November 1968)		2:49
3.	"Fat Man" (live at the BBC, 22 June 1969)		2:58
4.	"Bourée" (live at the BBC, 22 June 1969)	Johann Sebastian Bach, arranged by Ian Anderson	4:04
5.	"Stormy Monday Blues" (live at the BBC, 5 November 1968)	T-Bone Walker	4:07
6.	"A New Day Yesterday" (live at the BBC, 22 June 1969)		4:19
7.	"Cold Wind to Valhalla" (live at the BBC, April 1975)		1:31
8.	"Minstrel in the Gallery" (live at the BBC, April 1975)		2:11
9.	"Velvet Green" (live - 10 February 1977; later released as bonus track on 2003 remastered edition of Songs from the Wood)		5:54
10.	"Grace" (recorded by the Maison Rouge Mobile at Radio Monte Carlo for BBC Radio, April 1975)		0:42
11.	"Jack Frost and the Hooded Crow" (Coronach (1986)	Jethro Tull and David Palmer	3:21
12.	"I'm Your Gun" (from "Steel Monkey" limited edition cassette single (1987)		3:18
13.	"Down at the End of Your Road" (from "Steel Monkey", limited edition cassette single (1987)		3:32
14.	"Coronach" (from Coronach (1986)	David Palmer	3:51
15.	"Summerday Sands" (B-side to "Minstrel in the Gallery" single (1975)		3:44
16.	"Too Many Too" (from "Steel Monkey" limited edition cassette single (1987)		3:27
17.	"March the Mad Scientist" (from Ring Out, Solstice Bells [EP] (1976)		1:48
18.	"Pan Dance" (from Ring Out, Solstice Bells [EP] (1976)		3:26
19.	"Strip Cartoon" (B-side to "The Whistler" single (1977)		3:17
20.	"King Henry's Madrigal" (from Home [EP] (1979)	Traditional, arranged by David Palmer	3:00
21.	"A Stitch in Time" (single (1978), with "Sweet Dream" [live] as B-side)		3:38
22.	"17" (B-side to "Sweet Dream" single (1969)		3:07
23.	"One for John Gee" (Michael Abrahams; B-side to the "A Song for Jeffrey" single (1968)		2:05
24.	"Aeroplane" (Ian Anderson/Glenn Barnard Cornick; single, B-side to "Sunshine Day" single (1968)		2:17
25.	"Sunshine Day" (Michael Abrahams; single (1968)		2:25

Disc two - Flawed Gems and Other Sides of Tull
No.	Title	Length
1.	"Lick Your Fingers Clean" (recorded at Island Studios, London, in 1970, during Aqualung sessions; later released as bonus track on 1996 remastered edition of Aqualung)	2:46
2.	"The Chateau D'Isaster Tapes: Scenario/Audition/No Rehearsal" (previously unreleased (1988)	11:12
3.	"Beltane" (recorded during Songs from the Wood sessions, 1977; later released as bonus track on 2003 remastered edition of Songs from the Wood)	5:20
4.	"Crossword" (recorded at Maison Rouge Studios, London, in 1979)	3:36
5.	"Saturation" (recorded during War Child sessions, 1974; later released as bonus track on 2002 remastered edition of War Child)	4:20
6.	"Jack-A-Lynn" (recorded at Maison Rouge Studios, London, in 1981)	4:40
7.	"Motoreyes" (previously unreleased (1988)	3:38
8.	"Blues Instrumental (Untitled)" (previously unreleased (1988)	5:17
9.	"Rhythm in Gold" (recorded during The Broadsword and the Beast sessions, 1982; later released as bonus track on 2005 remastered edition of The Broadsword and the Beast)	3:07
10.	"Part of the Machine" (recorded by Ian Anderson at home, March 1988)	6:55
11.	"Mayhem, Maybe" (recorded at Maison Rouge Studios, London, in 1981; vocals, flute, and whistles by Ian Anderson added at home, April 1988)	3:05
12.	"Overhang" (recorded at Maison Rouge Studios, London, in 1981)	4:27
13.	"Kelpie" (recorded at Maison Rouge Studios, London, in 1979)	3:31
14.	"Living in These Hard Times" (recorded during Heavy Horses sessions, 1978; later released as bonus track on 2003 remastered edition of Heavy Horses)	3:10
15.	"Under Wraps 2" (from Under Wraps (1984)	2:15
16.	"Only Solitaire" (from War Child (1974)	1:30
17.	"Salamander" (from Too Old to Rock 'n' Roll: Too Young to Die (1976)	2:51
18.	"Moths" (from Heavy Horses (1978)	3:26
19.	"Nursie" (from Living in the Past (1972)	1:34

Disc three - The Essential Tull
No.	Title	Length
1.	"The Witch's Promise" (single (1970); later included on Living in the Past (1972)	3:49
2.	"Bungle in the Jungle" (from War Child (1974)	3:36
3.	"Farm on the Freeway" (recorded live at The Tower Theater, Upper Darby, Pennsylvania, 25 November 1987)	6:48
4.	"Thick as a Brick" (recorded live at Hammersmith Odeon, London, 29 October 1987)	6:39
5.	"Sweet Dream" (recorded live at Congress Centrum Halle, Hamburg, West Germany, 8 April 1982)	4:35
6.	"The Clasp" (recorded live at Congress Centrum Halle, Hamburg, West Germany, 8 April 1982)	3:31
7.	"Pibroch (Pee Break)/Black Satin Dancer" (recorded live at Congress Centrum Halle, Hamburg, West Germany, 8 April 1982)	4:02
8.	"Fallen on Hard Times" (recorded live at Congress Centrum Halle, Hamburg, West Germany, 8 April 1982)	4:00
9.	"Cheap Day Return" (from Aqualung (1971)	1:22
10.	"Wond'ring Aloud" (recorded live for Capitol Radio London at Hammersmith Odeon, London, 29 October 1987)	1:54
11.	"Dun Ringill" (recorded live for Capitol Radio London at Hammersmith Odeon, London, 29 October 1987)	3:05
12.	"Life's a Long Song" (from Life Is a Long Song [EP] (1971), later released on Living in the Past (1972)	3:18
13.	"One White Duck / 0^{10} = Nothing at All" (from Minstrel in the Gallery (1975)	4:36
14.	"Songs from the Wood" (recorded live for Capitol Radio London at Hammersmith Odeon, London, 29 October 1987)	4:30
15.	"Living in the Past" (recorded live at The Tower Theater, Upper Darby, Pennsylvania, 25 November 1987)	4:07
16.	"Teacher" (original single mix; from Benefit (1970)	4:48
17.	"Aqualung" (Ian Anderson, Jennie Anderson) (recorded live at Congress Centrum, Halle, Hamburg, West Germany, 8 April 1982)	7:44
18.	"Locomotive Breath" (recorded live at Congress Centrum Halle, Hamburg, West Germany, 8 April 1982)	6:00

== Notes ==
- "Sunshine Day" was the first single released by Tull, on 16 February 1968.
- "The Chateau D'Isaster Tapes" comprises three sections: "Scenario", "Audition" and "No Rehearsal". These later appeared as separate tracks on Nightcap.
- Many of these tracks are currently available on the remastered editions of Jethro Tull's studio albums.
- "17" and "A Stitch in Time" are shortened compared to the original 7" version (6:07 and 4:20 respectively). The original version of "17" was released on the Collector's Edition of Stand Up, released October 2010. The full-length version of "A Stitch in Time" was released on the 2019 collector's edition of Stormwatch.

== Charts ==
Chart (1988)	Peak position
Australian Albums (Kent Music Report)	100
UK Albums (OCC)	78
US Billboard 200	97

== See also ==
- 20 Years of Jethro Tull (1988) (video)
- 20 Years of Jethro Tull: Highlights (1988)
