= Crest of a Knave =

1987 studio album by Jethro Tull

Studio album by Jethro Tull
- Released: 7 September 1987
- Recorded: Early 1987
- Genres: Hard rock; progressive rock
- Length: 39:30 (vinyl); 48:50 (CD)
- Label: Chrysalis
- Producer: Jethro Tull

Jethro Tull chronology
Original Masters (1985)	Crest of a Knave (1987)	20 Years of Jethro Tull (1988)

Singles from Crest of a Knave
- 1. "Steel Monkey" Released: 5 October 1987; 2. "Said She Was a Dancer" Released: 28 December 1987

Crest of a Knave is the sixteenth studio album by British rock band Jethro Tull, released in 1987. The album was recorded after a three-year hiatus caused by a throat infection of vocalist Ian Anderson, resulting in his changed singing style. Following the unsuccessful electronic rock album Under Wraps, Crest of a Knave had the band returning to a more hard rock sound. The album was their most successful since the 1970s and the band enjoyed a resurgence on radio broadcasts, appearances in MTV specials and the airing of music videos. It was also a critical success, winning the 1989 Grammy Award for Best Hard Rock/Metal Performance Vocal or Instrumental in what was widely viewed as an upset over the favourite, Metallica's ...And Justice for All. The album was supported by "The Not Quite the World, More the Here and There Tour".

== Production ==
Drummer Doane Perry, who had joined Jethro Tull on tour in 1984, appears on only two tracks, with Gerry Conway, who had played on the 1982 album The Broadsword and the Beast, playing on four. The remaining tracks were recorded using a drum machine. Keyboardist Peter-John Vettese had left the band in 1986, and Ian Anderson contributed the synth programming. The album sleeve only lists Anderson, Martin Barre and Dave Pegg as band members. Barre remembers this production as being "the album where a lot of things were of my invention. There are still chunks of the music where Ian very much knew what he wanted, but I think my input was far greater on that album than on any other".

The cover was designed by heraldic artist Andrew Stewart Jamieson. The single "Steel Monkey" had the cover designed by art director John Pasche.

This album was released simultaneously on LP and on CD, but the vinyl edition did not feature the songs "Dogs in the Midwinter" and "The Waking Edge". Both tracks appeared on vinyl as B-sides to the singles.

The album back cover shows in the credits that the album was "Recorded just round the corner from the kitchen in the room behind the door which used to be painted white but isn't any more". And also: "Martin would like to thank Paul Hamer (Hamer Guitars). Ian and Dave would like to thank almost everybody else."

== Musical style ==
The album relied more heavily on Martin Barre's electric guitar than the band had since the 1970s. The style of Crest has been compared to that of Dire Straits, in part because Anderson no longer had the vocal range he once possessed (the result of recent throat surgery).

Ian Anderson later stated about the musical style of the album: "'Steel Monkey' was based around a sequencer riff, and it didn't have any flute in it. So it was yet another atypical Jethro Tull song that was a radio hit. By comparison, both 'Farm On The Freeway' and 'Budapest' are very typical Tull songs. 'Budapest' is the kind of song I like to write because it embodies a lot of different nuances which I think are subtly joined together. It sort of moves from classical to slightly bluesy to folk, and it just slips between them and you don't see the stitching."

== Themes ==
The album contains the popular live song "Budapest", which depicts a backstage scene with a shy local female stagehand. "Farm on the Freeway" profiles a farmer who has lost his land through eminent domain, and who now possesses only his truck. Anderson said the song is "about the plight of the American farmer, and the loss of livelihood, and the loss of land to compulsory orders to build new freeways and factories and so on." "Mountain Men" became more famous in Europe, depicting a scene from World War II in Africa and the Falklands War. Ian Anderson referred to the battles of El Alamein (WW II) and also South America (1982), drawing historic parallels of the angst that women left behind by their warrior husbands might have felt.

== Critical reception ==
Professional ratings
Review scores
Source	Rating
AllMusic	2.5/5 stars
The Encyclopedia of Popular Music	3/5 stars
Sputnikmusic	3/5 stars

Sounds' review was mixed. It recognised the quality and even called the opening tracks "Steel Monkey" and "Farm on the Freeway" "stunners". The overall evaluation was that: "In a shrewd move, Ian Anderson has studied the current heavy metal renewal and adapted it to suit his own ends, and the results are impressive to say the least". Although in the end, comparing the album with the style of Mark Knopfler, the review would go on to say that: "But in his efforts to stay 'hip', the hairy progressive rock guru has fallen prey not just to the influence of modern pop's more inspiring aspects but also to its foulest evils: the rank odour of Mark Knopfler pervades the remainder of 'Crest...' […] Shamefully and cruelly, the album is snuffed out. It's a pity, in all seriousness".

Although contemporarily well-accepted, AllMusic's later review was a little more committed, calling the album their best since Heavy Horses, but also stating: "Truth is, it isn't a bad album, with an opening track that qualifies as hard rock and pretty much shouts its credentials out in Martin Barre's screaming lead guitar line, present throughout. "Jump Start" and "Raising Steam" also rock hard, and no one can complain of too much on this record being soft, apart from the acoustic "The Waking Edge," along with "Budapest" and "Said She Was a Dancer," Anderson's two ageing rock-star's-eye-view accounts of meeting women from around the world. The antiwar song "Mountain Men" is classic Tull-styled electric folk, all screaming electric guitars at a pretty high volume by its end".

== Grammy controversy ==
Crest of a Knave won the 1989 Grammy Award for Best Hard Rock/Metal Performance Vocal or Instrumental, beating the heavily favoured ...And Justice for All by Metallica and critics' choice Nothing's Shocking by Jane's Addiction.

The Grammy award was controversial as many did not consider the album or Jethro Tull to be hard rock, much less heavy metal. Under advisement from their manager, no one from the band turned up to the award ceremony, as they were told that they had no chance of winning. In response to the controversy, the band's record label Chrysalis took out an advert in a British music periodical with the line, "The flute is a heavy, metal instrument!" The Grammy award was split into two categories and renamed after the event.

In 2007, the win was named one of the 10 biggest upsets in Grammy history by Entertainment Weekly.

Rolling Stone listed the Grammy Award as the 18th Most Awesomely Retro Moments in Grammy History.

In 1992, Metallica won the Grammy for Best Heavy Metal album, for their 1991 self-titled album. During the band's acceptance speech, drummer Lars Ulrich, paraphrasing Paul Simon's 1976 speech, said "We would personally like to thank Jethro Tull for not releasing an album this year!" Jethro Tull released the album Catfish Rising in 1991.

== Track listing ==
=== Vinyl ===
All tracks are written by Ian Anderson.

Side one
No.	Title	Length
1.	"Steel Monkey"	3:39
2.	"Farm on the Freeway"	6:31
3.	"Jump Start"	4:55
4.	"Said She Was a Dancer"	3:43

Side two
No.	Title	Length
1.	"Budapest"	10:05
2.	"Mountain Men"	6:20
3.	"Raising Steam"	4:05

=== CD ===
No.	Title	Length
1.	"Steel Monkey"	3:39
2.	"Farm on the Freeway"	6:31
3.	"Jump Start"	4:55
4.	"Said She Was a Dancer"	3:43
5.	"Dogs in the Midwinter"	4:37
6.	"Budapest"	10:05
7.	"Mountain Men"	6:20
8.	"The Waking Edge"	4:49
9.	"Raising Steam"	4:05

2005 remaster bonus track
No.	Title	Length
10.	"Part of the Machine"	6:54

The track originally appeared on the 20 Years of Jethro Tull box-set.

== Personnel ==
- Ian Anderson – vocals, flute, acoustic guitar, electric guitar, additional percussion, keyboards, Synclavier, drum programming (tracks 1, 5 & 9)
- Martin Barre – acoustic guitar, electric guitar
- Dave Pegg – bass guitar, acoustic bass (track 4)

Additional musicians

- Doane Perry – drums, percussion (tracks 2 & 7)
- Gerry Conway – drums, percussion (tracks 3, 4, 6 & 8)
- Ric Sanders – violin (tracks 6 & 8)

Additional personnel

- Robin Black – engineer
- Andrew Jamieson – artwork, calligraphy
- Tim Matyear – engineer
- John Pasche – art direction
- Stephen W. Tayler – engineer, remixing

== Charts ==
Chart (1987–1988)	Peak position
Australian Albums (Kent Music Report)	57
Austrian Albums (Ö3 Austria)	19
Canada Top Albums/CDs (RPM)	39
Finnish Albums (The Official Finnish Charts)	40
German Albums (Offizielle Top 100)	10
Swedish Albums (Sverigetopplistan)	40
Swiss Albums (Schweizer Hitparade)	7
UK Albums (Official Charts)	19
US Billboard 200	32

== Certifications ==
Region	Certification	Certified units/sales
Canada (Music Canada)	Gold	50,000^{^}
United Kingdom (BPI)	Gold	100,000^{^}
United States (RIAA)	Gold	500,000^{^}
^{^} Shipments figures based on certification alone.
