= A New Day Yesterday =

A New Day Yesterday may refer to:

- A New Day Yesterday (video album), by Jethro Tull
- "A New Day Yesterday", a 1969 song by Jethro Tull from the album Stand Up
- A New Day Yesterday (Joe Bonamassa album)
