= Rock Island (Jethro Tull album) =

1989 album by Jethro Tull

Studio album by Jethro Tull
- Released: 21 August 1989
- Recorded: Early 1989
- Genres: Progressive rock; hard rock
- Length: 50:21
- Label: Chrysalis
- Producer: Jethro Tull

Jethro Tull chronology
20 Years of Jethro Tull: Highlights (1988)	Rock Island (1989)	Live at Hammersmith '84 (1990)

Singles from Rock Island
- 1. "Another Christmas Song" Released: 4 December 1989

Professional ratings
Review scores
Source	Rating
AllMusic	3.5/5 stars
Classic Rock	8/10 stars
The Encyclopedia of Popular Music	2/5 stars

Rock Island is the seventeenth studio album by the British rock group Jethro Tull, released in 1989. The album continued the hard rock direction the band took on the previous effort, Crest of a Knave (1987). The line-up now included Ian Anderson, Martin Barre, Dave Pegg and drummer Doane Perry in his first full recording with the band, although he had already been a member of Jethro Tull since 1984. Without a permanent keyboard player, the role was shared by Fairport Convention's Maartin Allcock and former Tull member Peter Vettese.

Rock Island went Gold in the UK, with good sales also in Germany, where it peaked at No. 5. "Kissing Willie" was a hit on Rock radio, reaching No. 6 on the US Mainstream Rock Chart.

The staging on the 1989 tour supporting Rock Island featured projected silhouettes of lithe dancers during "Kissing Willie", ending with an image that bordered on pornographic. The song "Big Riff and Mando" reflects life on the road for the relentlessly touring musicians, giving a wry account of the theft of Barre's prized mandolin by a fan.

== Track listing ==
All tracks are written by Ian Anderson.

Side one
No.	Title	Length
1.	"Kissing Willie"	3:32
2.	"The Rattlesnake Trail"	4:02
3.	"Ears of Tin"	4:55
4.	"Undressed to Kill"	5:25
5.	"Rock Island"	6:54

Side two
No.	Title	Length
1.	"Heavy Water"	4:12
2.	"Another Christmas Song"	3:32
3.	"The Whaler's Dues"	7:53
4.	"Big Riff and Mando"	5:58
5.	"Strange Avenues"	4:10

2006 remaster bonus tracks
No.	Title	Length
11.	"Christmas Song" (Live)	3:06
12.	"Cheap Day Return/Mother Goose" (Live)	3:10
13.	"Locomotive Breath" (Live)	3:38

The bonus tracks were recorded live in Zurich, Switzerland on 13 October 1989. They had previously been released on the UK CD single of "Another Christmas Song".

== Personnel ==
- Ian Anderson – vocals, flute, acoustic guitar, keyboards, Synclavier, mandolin, drums, percussion (on tracks 2 & 7)
- Martin Barre – acoustic guitar, electric guitar
- David Pegg – bass guitar, acoustic bass, mandolin
- Doane Perry – drums, percussion

Additional personnel

- Maartin Allcock – keyboards (on tracks 1 & 10)
- Peter-John Vettese – additional keyboards (on tracks 3–6)
- Jim Gibson – illustrations
- Mark Tucker – mixing

== Charts ==
Chart (1989)	Peak position
Australian Albums (ARIA)	81
Austrian Albums (Ö3 Austria)	20
Canada Top Albums/CDs (RPM)	84
Dutch Albums (Album Top 100)	85
Finnish Albums (The Official Finnish Charts)	26
German Albums (Offizielle Top 100)	5
Norwegian Albums (VG-lista)	14
Swedish Albums (Sverigetopplistan)	35
Swiss Albums (Schweizer Hitparade)	7
UK Albums (Official Charts)	18
US Billboard 200	56

== Certifications ==
Region	Certification	Certified units/sales
United Kingdom (BPI)	Silver	60,000^{^}
^{^} Shipments figures based on certification alone.
