= M.U. – The Best of Jethro Tull =

M.U. - The Best of Jethro Tull

Compilation album by Jethro Tull
- Released: 9 January 1976
- Recorded: 1969–1975
- Genre: Progressive rock
- Length: 43:17
- Label: Chrysalis

Jethro Tull chronology
Minstrel in the Gallery (1975)	M.U. - The Best of Jethro Tull (1976)	Too Old to Rock 'n' Roll: Too Young to Die! (1976)

Singles from M.U. - The Best of Jethro Tull
- 1. "Locomotive Breath" Released: January 1976 (US); 2. "Living in the Past" Released: January 1976 (UK)

Professional ratings
Review scores
Source	Rating
AllMusic	4/5 stars
The Encyclopedia of Popular Music	3/5 stars

M.U. – The Best of Jethro Tull, released in 1976, is the first proper greatest hits album by Jethro Tull. It spans the years 1969 to 1975. The earlier Living in the Past (1972) compilation mainly dealt with non-album material, but this album only features one previously unreleased song, "Rainbow Blues".

"M.U." in the album title stands for "Musician's Union", which is probably a reference to the various musicians from different line-ups of the band appearing throughout the album.

It was later re-released as The Essential in 2003, with exactly the same song order, but a different album cover.

== Track listing ==
Side one

1. "Teacher" (A, C, E, G, M) – 4:07 (alternative mix)
2. "Aqualung" (C, E, H, I, J) – 6:34 (alternative mix, including the song's opening guitar riff played twice - previous US edits of the song began three seconds later, with the second playing of the riff)
3. "Thick as a Brick Edit #1" (B, E, H, M, R) – 3:01 (The first three minutes of "Thick as a Brick, Part One")
4. "Bungle in the Jungle" (B, E, H, M, R) – 3:34
5. "Locomotive Breath" (C, E, H, I, J) – 4:23 (alternate mix)

Side two

1. "Fat Man" (A, C, M) – 2:50
2. "Living in the Past" (C, G, U) – 3:18
3. "A Passion Play Edit #8" (B, E, H, M, R) – 3:28 ("Overseer Overture", which occurs about 8 minutes into "A Passion Play, Part Two")
4. "Skating Away on the Thin Ice of the New Day" (B, E, H, M) – 4:02
5. "Rainbow Blues" (B, E, H, M, R) – 3:37
6. "Nothing Is Easy" (A, C, G, M) – 4:23

== Personnel ==
As mentioned and sorted on the back cover:

- Ian Anderson – flute, acoustic guitar, soprano saxophone, mandolin and voice
- Martin Barre – electric guitar and acoustic guitar
- (E) John Evan – piano, hammond organ, synthesizer and piano accordion
- (G) Glenn Cornick – bass guitar
- (H) Jeffrey Hammond – bass guitar
- (C) Clive Bunker – drums and percussion
- (B) Barriemore Barlow – drums and percussion
- (M) Recorded at Morgan Studios, London
- (I) Recorded at Island Studios, London
- (U) Recorded at Vantone Studio, West Orange, New Jersey
- (R) Engineered by Robin Black
- (J) Engineered by John Burns
- (A) Engineered by Andy Johns
- (P) 1972, 1973, 1974 and 1975 Chrysalis Records

Production by Ian Anderson and Terry Ellis. Orchestrations arranged and conducted by Dee Palmer.

Art direction by OZ Studios. Designed by Eric Michelson.

== Charts ==
Chart (1976)	Peak position
Australian Albums (Kent Music Report)	31
Canada Top Albums/CDs (RPM)	25
New Zealand Albums (RMNZ)	24
UK Albums (Official Charts)	44
US Billboard 200	13

== Certifications ==
Region	Certification	Certified units/sales
Australia (ARIA)	Gold	20,000^{^}
Germany (BVMI)	Gold	250,000^{^}
United Kingdom (BPI)	Gold	100,000^{^}
United States (RIAA)	Platinum	1,000,000^{^}
^{^} Shipments figures based on certification alone.
