= Skating Away on the Thin Ice of the New Day =

Single by Jethro Tull

from the album War Child
- B-side: "Sealion"
- Released: 17 February 1975
- Recorded: 10 September 1972 at the Château d'Hérouville, France
- Genre: Progressive rock; folk rock
- Label: Chrysalis
- Songwriter(s): Ian Anderson
- Producer(s): Ian Anderson

Jethro Tull singles chronology
"Bungle in the Jungle" (1974)	"Skating Away on the Thin Ice of the New Day" (1975)	"Minstrel in the Gallery" (1975)

"Skating Away on the Thin Ice of the New Day" is a song by British progressive rock band Jethro Tull. It was released on their album War Child in 1974. Written as a comment on global cooling for the band's aborted "Chateau D'isaster" album, the song was reworked in 1974 for War Child.

The song was released as a single in 1975 and reached number 75 on the Cashbox charts in the US. Despite its limited chart success, the song has seen positive critical reception from music writers and has appeared on several compilation albums.

== Background ==
"Skating Away on the Thin Ice of the New Day" was written by Jethro Tull frontman Ian Anderson, who dubbed it his "first climate change song" due to its lyrics about the then-current concern over global cooling. He later explained,

This was my first song talking about the issue of ecology and, in this specific case, climate change. Back in those days, scientists believed that we were heading towards a period of global cooling, that we could be heading towards a new ice age. And in fact, they realized that in fact, no, we're heading toward a period of global warming. So my song became kind of redundant. But the idea was sound. And I still have a fondness for it today, because it is talking with optimism about facing the changing world and a changing climate to which we have to adapt, bravely and optimistically. And it feels very apt and appropriate for today.

Like other songs on War Child, "Skating Away on the Thin Ice of the New Day" was initially written as part of the "Chateau D'isaster Tapes", an early version of A Passion Play. An early version appears on the 2014 re-release of A Passion Play as a bonus track.

== Release ==
"Skating Away on the Thin Ice of the New Day" was first released as on the War Child album in 1974. After the success of the album's lead-off single, "Bungle in the Jungle", in the US, "Skating Away on the Thin Ice of the New Day" was released as a follow-up in the US and Germany in 1975. The B-side of the single was "Sealion". It did not chart in Germany or on the Billboard charts in America, though it did reach number 75 on the Cashbox charts in the US.

The song has since appeared on several compilation albums, including M.U. – The Best of Jethro Tull, Original Masters, The Best of Jethro Tull – The Anniversary Collection, The Best of Acoustic Jethro Tull, and The Essential. The song was also a live favorite, appearing live on albums such as Bursting Out and on the concert video Slipstream.

== Reception ==
"Skating Away on the Thin Ice of the New Day" has received praise from critics, who generally note the song as one of the highlights of War Child. In a 1975 review, Cash Box said that "opening with acoustical guitar and Ian Anderson's distinctive vocal, the song grows slowly into a cute, catchy arrangement and ends upbeat and uplifting" and praised the song's "great form and a perfect sense of balance." Retrospective reviews have been similarly positive—Bruce Eder of Allmusic called the track "a beautiful, largely acoustic number" while the same site's Daniel de Visé called it "the sparkling standout" of War Child and "a gorgeous acoustic song dressed up into a pop hit." Ryan Reed of Ultimate Classic Rock wrote that the song "ranks among the most essential Tull pieces". Eric Senich of WRKI ranked the song the seventh best Jethro Tull song, praising the "amazing acoustic guitar work" on the track. Chuck Darrow of Bettors Insider called the song "classic". PopMatters critic David Pike rated it one of the "41 essential pop/rock songs with accordion."
