= 20 Years of Jethro Tull: Highlights =

Compilation album & box set sampler by Jethro Tull
- Released: 11 October 1988 (UK); 16 January 1989 (US)
- Recorded: 1968–1988
- Genre: Rock
- Length: 77:38 (CD)
- Label: Chrysalis
- Producer: Ian Anderson

Jethro Tull chronology
20 Years of Jethro Tull (1988)	20 Years of Jethro Tull: Highlights (1988)	Rock Island (1989)

Professional ratings
Review scores
Source	Rating
Allmusic	4.5/5 stars
The Encyclopedia of Popular Music	4/5 stars
Rolling Stone	3/5 stars

20 Years of Jethro Tull: Highlights is a 27-track (21 on CD) distillation of the Jethro Tull box set 20 Years of Jethro Tull.

== Track listing ==
No.	Title	Length
1.	"Stormy Monday Blues"	4:05
2.	"Love Story"	2:43
3.	"A New Day Yesterday"	4:19
4.	"Summerday Sands"	3:45
5.	"Coronach" (not on CD)	3:52
6.	"March the Mad Scientist"	1:47
7.	"Pibroch (Pee-Break)/Black Satin Dancer" (live; not on CD)	4:00
8.	"Lick Your Fingers Clean"	2:47
9.	"Overhang"	4:27
10.	"Crossword"	3:34
11.	"Saturation" (not on CD)	4:23
12.	"Jack-A-Lynn"	4:41
13.	"Motoreyes" (not on CD)	3:39
14.	"Part of the Machine"	6:54
15.	"Mayhem, Maybe"	3:04
16.	"Kelpie"	3:32
17.	"Under Wraps 2" (not on CD)	2:14
18.	"Wond'ring Aloud" (live)	1:58
19.	"Dun Ringill" (live)	3:00
20.	"Life Is a Long Song"	3:17
21.	"Nursie"	1:32
22.	"Grace"	0:33
23.	"Witch's Promise"	3:50
24.	"Teacher" (not on CD)	4:43
25.	"Living in the Past" (live)	4:07
26.	"Aqualung" (live)	7:43
27.	"Locomotive Breath" (live)	6:00

== Charts ==
Chart (1989)	Peak position
Australian Albums (ARIA)	94

== See also ==
- 20 Years of Jethro Tull (1988 boxed set)
- 20 Years of Jethro Tull (1988 video)
