= Live at Hammersmith '84 =

1990 live album by Jethro Tull

Live album by Jethro Tull
- Released: 10 December 1990
- Recorded: 9 September 1984
- Venue: Hammersmith Odeon, London
- Genre: Progressive rock, hard rock
- Length: 42:09
- Label: Raw Fruit
- Producer: Tony Wilson, Dale Griffin (for the BBC)

Jethro Tull chronology
Rock Island (1989)	Live at Hammersmith '84 (1990)	Catfish Rising (1991)

Professional ratings
Review scores
Source	Rating
The Encyclopedia of Popular Music	2/5 stars

Live at Hammersmith '84 is a live album by Jethro Tull, recorded on Sunday 9 September 1984 at the Hammersmith Odeon in London. It was the fourth release in an official series of similar, radio-archive releases by several bands (see Raw Fruit Records), this title being released in 1990. The tracks had been recorded for broadcast by BBC Radio, receiving their first broadcast on 27 December 1984 and were released under licence.

The original vinyl release had the catalogue number Raw Fruit Records FRSLP004 A1 B1. It was also released on cassette and CD.

== Track listing ==
Side one
No.	Title	Length
1.	"Locomotive Breath" (instrumental)	2:36
2.	"Hunting Girl"	4:56
3.	"Under Wraps #1"	4:30
4.	"Later, That Same Evening"	4:03
5.	"Pussy Willow"	4:44

Side two
No.	Title	Length
6.	"Living in the Past"	4:29
7.	"Locomotive Breath"	7:43
8.	"Too Old to Rock 'n' Roll: Too Young to Die!"	9:08

== Notes ==
- Recorded during the Under Wraps tour of 1984.
- At Hammersmith Odeon for three successive performances beginning 7 September 1984.

== Personnel ==
- Ian Anderson – flute, acoustic guitar, vocals
- Martin Barre – electric guitar
- Doane Perry – drums
- Peter-John Vettese – keyboards
- Dave Pegg – bass
