= 20 Years of Jethro Tull (video) =

Video by Jethro Tull
- Released: 1988
- Recorded: 1977; 1978; 1988
- Genre: Progressive Rock
- Label: Chrysalis

Jethro Tull chronology
Slipstream (1981)	20 Years of Jethro Tull (1988)	A New Day Yesterday (2003)

20 Years of Jethro Tull (1988) is a video by Jethro Tull, also known as Jethro Tull: This Is the First 20 Years. It consists of interviews with fans, frontman Ian Anderson, Terry Ellis and Chris Wright of Chrysalis Records, and John Gee of the Marquee Club, giving a rough chronology of the band, interspersed with clips from music videos and live performances. Many of the live performances are culled from the Madison Square Garden performance (see Live at Madison Square Garden 1978) during the 1978 Heavy Horses tour.

== Track list ==
1. "Living in the Past"
2. "To Be Sad Is a Mad Way to Be"
3. "The Whistler" (music video)
4. "Too Old to Rock 'N' Roll; Too Young to Die" (music video)
5. "Teacher"
6. "Thick as a Brick"
7. "Songs from the Wood"
8. "Aqualung"
9. "Heavy Horses" (music video)
10. "Lap of Luxury"
11. "Said She Was a Dancer"
12. "Budapest"
13. "Steel Monkey" (music video)
14. "Jump Start"

== Certifications ==
Region	Certification	Certified units/sales
United States (RIAA)	Gold	50,000^{^}
^{^} Shipments figures based on certification alone.

== See also ==
- 20 Years of Jethro Tull (boxed set)
- 20 Years of Jethro Tull: Highlights (sampler)
- Living with the Past
