= Grammy Award for Best Hard Rock/Metal Performance Vocal or Instrumental =

Award presented at the Grammy Awards

- Awarded for: Quality works in the hard rock/metal music genre
- Country: United States
- Presented by: National Academy of Recording Arts and Sciences
- First award: 1989
- Final award: 1989
- Website: grammy.com

The Grammy Award for Best Hard Rock/Metal Performance Vocal or Instrumental was an award presented at the 31st Grammy Awards in 1989 to honor quality hard rock/metal works (albums or songs). The Grammy Awards, an annual ceremony that was established in 1958 and originally called the Gramophone Awards, are presented by the National Academy of Recording Arts and Sciences of the United States to "honor artistic achievement, technical proficiency and overall excellence in the recording industry, without regard to album sales or chart position."

== Overview ==
The Academy recognized hard rock music artists for the first time in 1989 with the category Best Hard Rock/Metal Performance Vocal or Instrumental, combining two of the most popular music genres of the 1980s. Metallica, who were expected to win the inaugural award for their album ...And Justice for All, lost to Jethro Tull whose album Crest of a Knave won, also beating out Jane's Addiction, Iggy Pop, as well as AC/DC.

This choice led to widespread criticism of the Academy, as journalists suggested that Jethro Tull's music did not belong in either the hard rock or heavy metal genres. In response, the Academy separated the genres creating the categories Best Hard Rock Performance and Best Metal Performance. This incident is often considered an example of the Grammy Awards being out of touch with popular sentiment, and was named the biggest upset in Grammy history by Entertainment Weekly.

In 2012, the combined Hard Rock/Metal category returned following a major overhaul of Grammy Award categories. The separate Best Hard Rock Performance and Best Metal Performance categories were merged into the slightly renamed Best Hard Rock/Metal Performance category. However, in June 2013, it was announced that the combined category was being discontinued in favor of reinstating Best Metal Performance. Beginning in 2014, quality hard rock performances were recognized under the category Best Rock Performance.

== Award ==
In 1988, the National Academy of Recording Arts and Sciences added a Hard Rock/Metal Performance category for the 31st Grammy Awards. Nominated works for the award were Blow Up Your Video by AC/DC, "Cold Metal" by Iggy Pop (from the album Instinct), Nothing's Shocking by Jane's Addiction, Crest of a Knave by Jethro Tull, and ...And Justice for All by Metallica. Jethro Tull's lead singer Ian Anderson was surprised by the band's nomination, as both Anderson and music critics did not consider the group's music to be part of the heavy metal music genre.

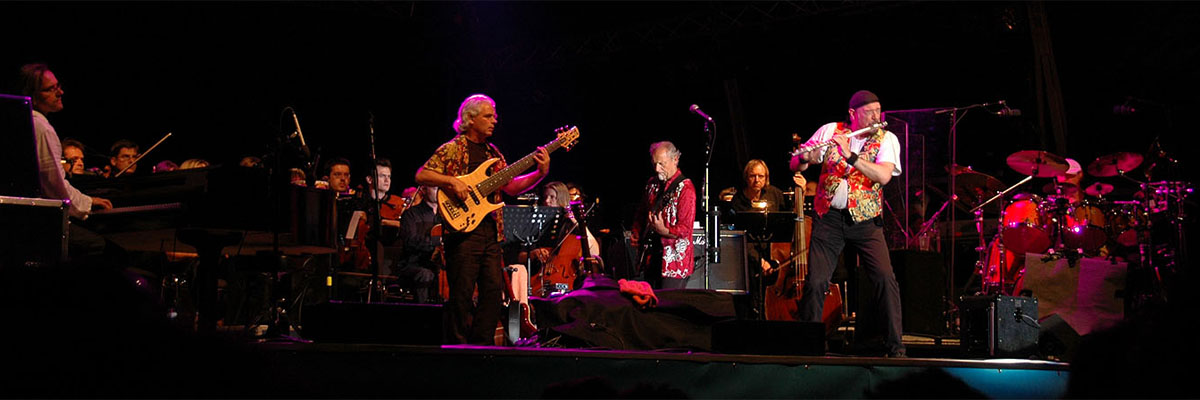
Members of the award-winning band Jethro Tull, performing in Germany in 2007

Metallica's performance at the ceremony, held in February 1989 at the Shrine Auditorium in Los Angeles, marked the first time a heavy metal group had performed during the Grammy Awards. Metallica was expected to win the award, and members of Jethro Tull were told by their record label Chrysalis Records not to bother attending the ceremony because they "weren't likely to win." However, Jethro Tull won the award (recipients included members Ian Anderson, Martin Barre, and Dave Pegg), and when presenters Alice Cooper and Lita Ford announced the result, booing could be heard from the crowd. Anderson, who assumed that the band was being recognized for their twenty-year history, as opposed to a single album, later stated that he was "lucky" not to have attended the ceremony, as "there's no way I could have accepted it under those circumstances."

== Controversy and aftermath ==
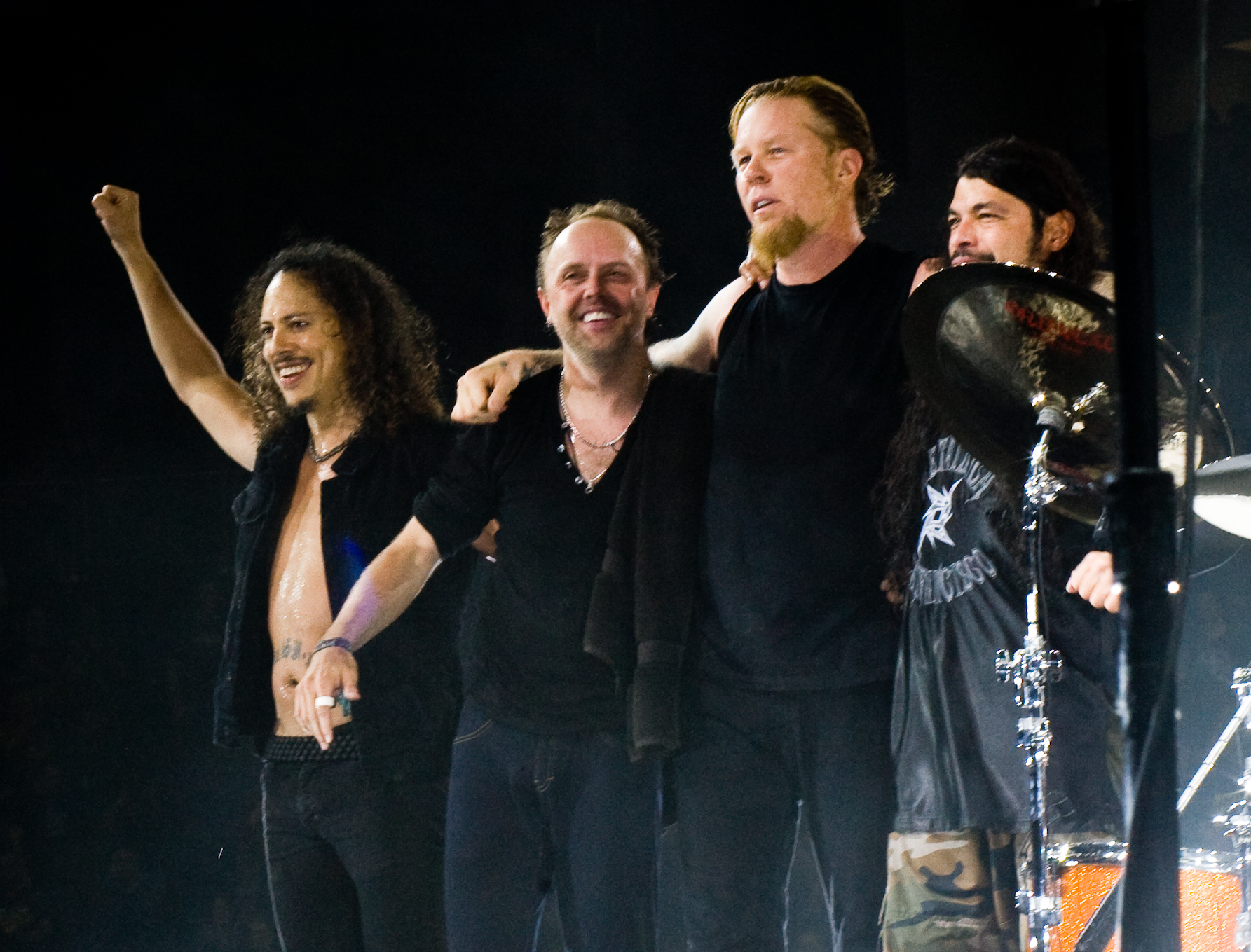
Members of Metallica, the band expected to win the award, performing in 2008. As of 2018, the band has received six Grammy Awards for Best Metal Performance.

The result, considered an "embarrassment" for the Academy, generated much controversy. In response to the criticism they received over the award, Jethro Tull's record label took out an advertisement in Billboard magazine with a picture of a flute (part of their trademark sound) lying amid a pile of iron rebars and the line, "The flute is a heavy, metal instrument!" Metallica also added a sticker to subsequent releases of ...And Justice for All, reading: "Grammy Award LOSERS".

Separate awards for Best Hard Rock Performance and Best Metal Performance were introduced in 1990. Beginning that year, Metallica won three consecutive Grammy Awards for Best Metal Performance for the song "One" from ...And Justice for All, their cover of Queen's "Stone Cold Crazy", and their eponymous album in 1992. When Metallica won the Grammy in 1992, drummer Lars Ulrich referenced the previous award by facetiously "thanking" Jethro Tull for not putting out an album that year, though they actually had released the album Catfish Rising in 1991. A decade after Jethro Tull defeated Metallica, Ulrich admitted: "I'd be lying if I didn't tell you I was disappointed. Human nature is that you'd rather win than lose, but Jethro Tull walking away with it makes a huge mockery of the intentions of the event." As of 2010, Metallica holds the record for the most wins in the metal category, with a total of six.

This incident is often cited as an example of the Grammy Awards selection committee being out of touch with popular sentiment, and was named the biggest upset in Grammy history by Entertainment Weekly. Other publications that have included the Best Hard Rock/Metal Performance upset in their lists of top Grammy moments include Cracked.com (number one), Time (number ten), and the Ventura County Star (number twenty).

== See also ==
- 1989 in heavy metal music
- Jethro Tull discography
- List of awards and nominations received by Metallica
- Metallica discography
