= Teacher (Jethro Tull song) =

- Artwork for the Chrysalis sheet music

Song by Jethro Tull
- A-side: "The Witch's Promise"
- Released: 16 January 1970
- Recorded: December 1969
- Studio: Morgan Studios, London
- Genre: Blues rock, hard rock
- Label: Chrysalis
- Songwriter: Ian Anderson
- Producers: Ian Anderson; Terry Ellis

Jethro Tull singles chronology
"Sweet Dream" (1969)	"The Witch's Promise" / "Teacher" (1970)	"Inside" (1970)

"Teacher" is a song by the British rock band Jethro Tull, first released as the B-side to the January 1970 single "The Witch's Promise", on the Chrysalis label. Written by the band's frontman Ian Anderson, the song is a comment on the corruption of self-styled gurus who used their followers for their own gain.

After its release on the "Witch's Promise" single, an alternate re-recorded version of the song later appeared on the US release of the album Benefit. This version would become a radio hit in the US and appear on several compilation albums.

== Background ==
"Teacher" was written by Jethro Tull frontman Ian Anderson. He later stated the song was influenced by his skepticism of teacher-like gurus who had been influencing other musicians of the time, though some perceived the song to be a comment on the band's manager, Terry Ellis. He reflected:

Interestingly, our manager is convinced to this day that this is actually a song I wrote about him and that he is the teacher, which is complete bollocks. In fact, what I was singing about was more those creepy guru figures that would mislead innocent young minds like those of the Beatles. They would suck in people and use the power of persuasion to bend their will and lead them on a spiritual path to enlightenment. And a lot of the time, of course, it was just about getting your money and driving around in a big, white Rolls-Royce, which struck me as worthy of writing a song about. I wasn't singing necessarily about spiritual leaders of a particular ethnic persuasion or a particular religious view, but just the idea of the teacher, the guru.

Unlike its more folk-inflected A-side, "The Witch's Promise", "Teacher" features a standard, rock-oriented arrangement and structure. Anderson commented, "Every so often there are those songs that fall into the conventional pop rock structure—songs like 'Teacher', for instance—but that style isn't our forte. We're not very good at it because I'm not that kind of a singer, and it doesn't come easy to me to do that stuff."

The two songs on the "Witch's Promise" single were the first recording to feature keyboardist John Evan, who would join Jethro Tull as a permanent member shortly after and would remain with the band throughout the 1970s. He was sharing a flat with frontman Ian Anderson at the time, and agreed to perform as a session musician. He played Hammond organ on "Teacher" and both piano and Mellotron on "The Witch's Promise". This led to an offer to join the band full-time.

== Release and reception ==
The first version of "Teacher" was released as the B-side to the band's January 1970 single, "The Witch's Promise". The single was successful, reaching number four in the UK. The band then recorded a second, more radio friendly version of the song for the American market, which would appear on the US version of their 1970 studio album Benefit. This second version, which featured Anderson's flute playing and a faster tempo, would go on to receive substantial FM-radio play.

Since its release, the US album recording of "Teacher" has appeared on several compilation albums, the earliest instance being its inclusion in remixed form on the band's 1972 Living in the Past compilation. Other compilations that feature "Teacher" include M.U. – The Best of Jethro Tull, 20 Years of Jethro Tull: Highlights, The Best of Jethro Tull – The Anniversary Collection, Essential, and 50 for 50. A classical arrangement of the song, performed by Jethro Tull with the London Symphony Orchestra, appears on the 1985 album A Classic Case.

"Teacher" has largely seen a positive critical reception since its release. Writing for Louder magazine, Mark Tornillo of Accept named it to his list of the top ten Jethro Tull songs from 1969 to 1972, writing, "I always just liked the lyrics and the groove." Eric Senich of WRKI ranked the song the seventh best Jethro Tull song, writing, "Ian Anderson has admitted to writing this song with the sole purpose of creating a hit single. A very "un-Tull" like thing to do but, hey, if you're gonna write a pop song and it ends up sounding like this you can write all the pop songs you want Ian!" The Daily Vault wrote that the song "glides by on effortless attitude".

== Personnel ==
- Ian Anderson – vocals, flute
- Martin Barre – guitar
- Glenn Cornick – bass
- Clive Bunker – drums

Additional personnel

- John Evan – Hammond organ
