= The Broadsword and the Beast =

1982 studio album by Jethro Tull

Studio album by Jethro Tull
- Released: 9 April 1982
- Recorded: 24 March 1981 – 5 February 1982
- Studios: Maison Rouge Studios, Fulham, London
- Genres: Progressive rock; hard rock; art rock; folk rock; electronic rock
- Length: 38:49
- Label: Chrysalis
- Producer: Paul Samwell-Smith

Jethro Tull chronology
A (1980)	The Broadsword and the Beast (1982)	Under Wraps (1984)

Singles from The Broadsword and the Beast
- 1. "Broadsword" Released: May 1982 (UK); 2. "Fallen on Hard Times" Released: May 1982 (US)

The Broadsword and the Beast is the fourteenth studio album by rock band Jethro Tull, released in April 1982 by Chrysalis Records. The album's musical style features a cross between the dominant synthesizer sound of the 1980s and the folk-influenced style that Jethro Tull used in the previous decade. As such, the band's characteristic acoustic instrumentation is augmented by electronic soundscapes. The electronic aspects of this album would be explored further by the band on their next album, Under Wraps (1984), as well as on Ian Anderson's solo album Walk into Light (1983).

Paul Samwell-Smith produced the album, making The Broadsword and the Beast the first and only Jethro Tull album produced by an external producer outside of the band and their management. Early sessions for the album were produced by Keith Olsen. However, Olsen was dismissed amid creative differences in December 1981; he was not credited on the album. The album was the first Jethro Tull album to feature Peter-John Vettese on keyboards and Gerry Conway on drums.

== Background and recording ==
After the conclusion of the A tour in late February 1981, Jethro Tull was in need of a new keyboardist and drummer, as keyboardist Eddie Jobson, who billed himself as a "special guest" when performing with Tull, and drummer Mark Craney had departed with the conclusion of the tour. Cat Stevens drummer Gerry Conway was recruited due to being a longtime acquaintance of the band as well as his connections to Fairport Convention, Tull bassist Dave Pegg's band. Anderson, Barre, Pegg and Conway began recording sessions in March 1981 at Maison Rouge Studios with Anderson playing keyboards, recording until July when the band took a four-month break. While the sessions had produced several tracks, only two ("Beastie" and "Watching Me, Watching You") would make it to the final album, with the rest cut as Anderson felt that "overall they didn't have a theme or a concept about them that was driving them towards a certain conclusion." In late summer, Peter-John Vettese was hired as the band's new keyboardist after answering an ad for the position placed in Melody Maker.

Chrysalis Records had suggested that the band pursue working with an outside producer on their next album. Canadian producer Bob Ezrin, known for his work with Alice Cooper, Kiss and Pink Floyd, was initially selected; however after Ezrin had to pull out at the last minute, American producer Keith Olsen was selected. Recording resumed at Maison Rouge in November 1981 with the newly completed band and Olsen producing. The band quickly found Olsen's working style clashing with theirs; while Anderson described Olsen as "a nice enough chap" he described his method of recording with no equalization or effects as "a way of working that was completely alien to me". Other members of the band also found themselves in disagreement with Olsen, including Pegg who described Olsen's selection as "record company shite". The band were also disturbed that Olsen's "personal lifestyle choices were not those of the rest of us."

Former Yardbird Paul Samwell-Smith was ultimately brought in as a new producer for the album after a recommendation from Conway, who had previously worked with him in Cat Stevens' band. Samwell-Smith arrived in mid-December and the band recorded with him until the album was mastered in February 1982. Samwell-Smith, who described his role on the album as "very much a case of looking to Ian to see what he wanted and then to help him do it", was praised by the band who found him easy to work with. The album was the last recorded by Tull at Maison Rouge, as Anderson sold it in 1983.

The album was originally intended to be called Beastie, corresponding to the first track on side one. But during production, the band deliberated over the preference between Beastie and Broadsword, the first track on side two. In the end, they decided (as on Aqualung) to give each side its own title and thus its own identity, and this time to combine both in the album title.

== Artwork and packaging ==
The cover art was illustrated by American artist Iain McCaig, a longtime fan of the band who later went on to work as a concept artist for successful film series including Star Wars, Harry Potter and the Marvel Cinematic Universe. McCaig was such a fan of the band that he cancelled a surprise trip to Paris where he planned to propose to his girlfriend so that he could get the job to design the cover. The art was made after McCaig visited Maison Rouge to meet the band and discuss the cover with Anderson, who gave McCaig a cassette of demos to listen to. McCaig has stated that he intentionally drew hidden "easter eggs" in the album art, including runes on the back cover which spell out the initials of McCaig's brother.

The edges of the front cover feature writing in Anglo-Saxon runes, which translate to the opening verse of the song "Broadsword":

"I see a dark sail on the horizon, set under a black cloud that hides the sun. Bring me my broadsword and clear understanding. Bring me my cross of gold as a talisman."

== Release ==
In 1984, Mobile Fidelity Sound Lab issued a half-speed mastered edition of the album (MFSL 1-092) which was a minor seller at the time.

The 2005 CD reissue of the album was heavily expanded to include eight bonus tracks recorded during the Broadsword sessions, but not included in the original 1982 album.

A greatly expanded, eight-disc (five CDs and three DVDs) re-release of the album titled The 40th Anniversary Monster Edition was released on September 1, 2023, featuring new stereo and surround remixes by Steven Wilson, additional demos and session recordings, plus a 1982 live concert. The re-release has been stated to be the last of the anniversary box set series the band has released (since 2011) that will be remixed by Steve Wilson. Bursting Out and Under Wraps were remixed by others.

== Live performance ==
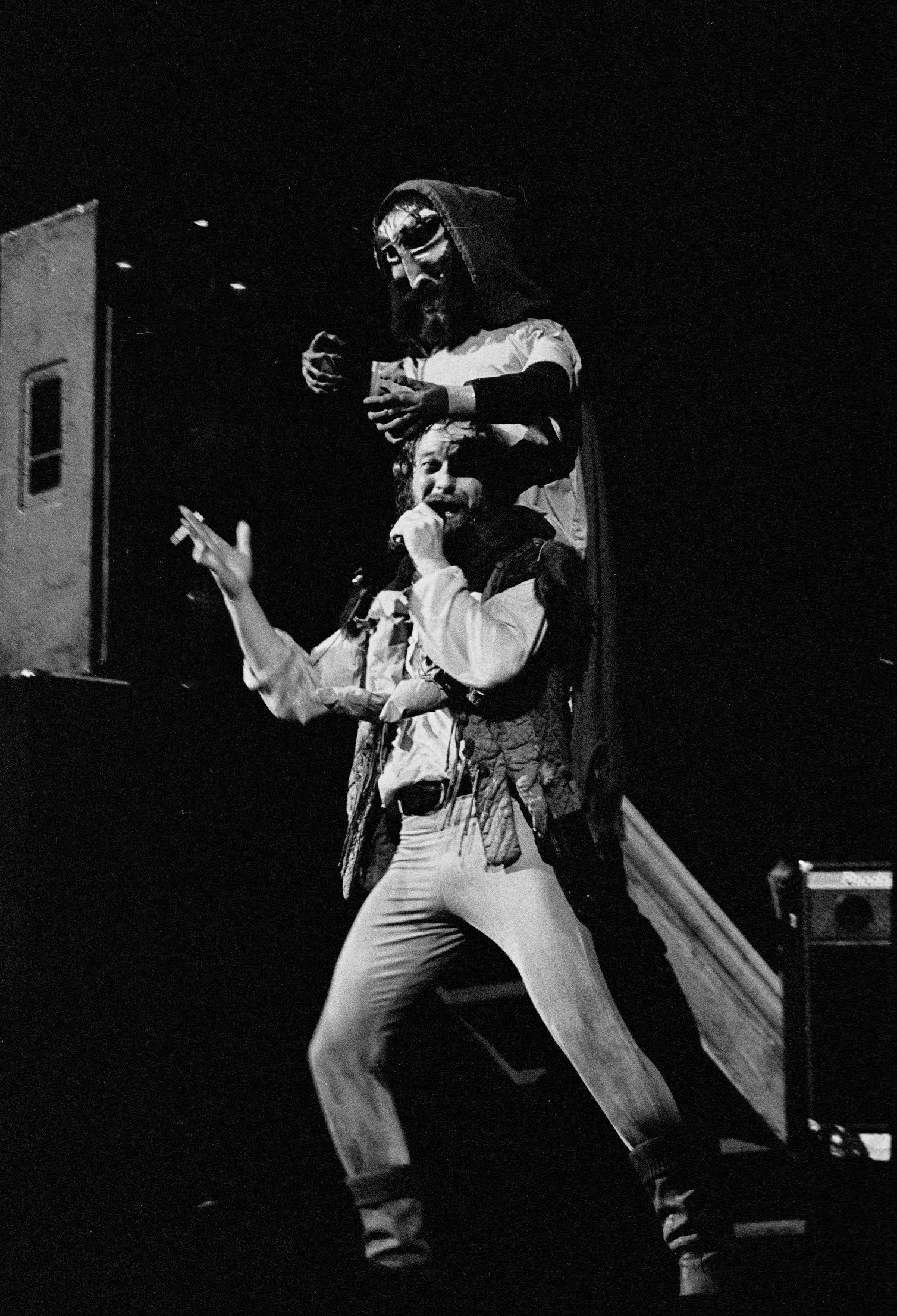
Ian Anderson Broadsword and the Beast concert, Dallas, Texas, 1982.

The tour for Broadsword was the last of the band's to be exceedingly theatrical. It included the entire stage being decorated to look like a pirate ship, which Ian Anderson, as he said in the liner notes for the remastered CD, thought was "very silly". Extensive notes on the production of the album and subsequent tour can be found at the official Jethro Tull website.

In a 1982 concert review, Chris Welch reported: "Squire Anderson waved a huge broadsword dangerously near Martin's nether extremities during songs from their latest album (The Broadsword And The Beast), and punted huge exploding balloons out into the audience. But it was the roar of the band as they got into their heaviest moments that ultimately captivated an audience who seemed evenly mixed between 14-year-old novice Tull freaks and silver-haired rock business veterans. [...] Tull have a vast library of music to perform. They could have played on for another two hours and the audience would have been with them, cheering all the way."

"Cheerio", the final track of the original release, was for some years played as the final encore at Jethro Tull concerts.

== Critical reception ==
Professional ratings
Review scores
Source	Rating
AllMusic	1.5/5 stars
The Encyclopedia of Popular Music	3/5 stars
The Great Rock Discography	4/10
MusicHound	woof!
Prog	4/5 stars
Record Mirror	4/5 stars
Rolling Stone	2/5 stars
The Rolling Stone Album Guide	3/5 stars
Under the Radar	7/10

Critical reviews for the album were mostly unfavorable. The review by Kerrang! was ambiguous, calling the album tracks "emotional pieces of composition depending on how much attention you are prepared to give" but overall stated that "If you're a fan, buy it, it may have some pleasant surprises. If, like me, you're not, borrow it from someone who is. You might be surprised too". Rolling Stone magazine, in their two stars review stated: "There's nothing wrong with living in the past, perhaps. Indeed, Ian Anderson can make the wisdom of the ages seem preferable to the rootless philandering of the present day. But on The Broadsword and the Beast, the real beast may be Anderson's penchant for ponderous sermonizing." Bruce Eder of AllMusic was not too impressed with the album. Recalling the production and the music overall, he stated that "this time in the hands of ex-Yardbird Paul Samwell-Smith, is smoother, less heavy, and more thinly textured than their past work, and there are times – most especially on "Flying Colours" – where they could almost pass for the latter-day Moody Blues, something the band never would have permitted in earlier days".

Former Genesis guitarist Steve Hackett has stated that The Broadsword and the Beast is one of his favourite albums.

Overall sales for The Broadsword and the Beast were better than Stormwatch and A. The album charted at No. 14 in Germany and Norway, No. 19 in the United States and No. 27 in the UK, while the single "Fallen On Hard Times" was a modest hit, reaching No. 20 on the US Billboard Mainstream Rock Tracks Chart.

== Track listing ==
All tracks are written by Ian Anderson with additional material by Peter-John Vettese.

Side one – Beastie
No.	Title	Length
1.	"Beastie"	3:58
2.	"Clasp"	4:18
3.	"Fallen On Hard Times"	3:13
4.	"Flying Colours"	4:39
5.	"Slow Marching Band"	3:40

Side two – Broadsword
No.	Title	Length
1.	"Broadsword"	5:03
2.	"Pussy Willow"	3:55
3.	"Watching Me, Watching You"	3:41
4.	"Seal Driver"	5:10
5.	"Cheerio"	1:09

2005 CD bonus tracks
No.	Title	Length
11.	"Jack Frost and the Hooded Crow"	3:22
12.	"Jack-A-Lynn"	4:40
13.	"Mayhem Maybe" (with vocals recorded circa 1988)	3:06
14.	"Too Many Too"	3:28
15.	"Overhang"	4:29
16.	"Rhythm in Gold"	3:08
17.	"I Am Your Gun"	3:19
18.	"Down at the End of Your Road"	3:31

Note: The remastered CD added bonus tracks (which had been on the 20 Years of Jethro Tull box-set) and extensive liner notes. Further tracks from the same sessions (and not included on the remastered CD) are "Motoreyes" (from the 20 Years box) and "Crew Nights", "The Curse", "Commons Brawl", "No Step", "Drive On The Young Side of Life", and "Lights Out" from the outtakes album Nightcap.

== Personnel ==
Jethro Tull

- Ian Anderson – lead vocals, flute, acoustic guitar, Fairlight CMI
- Martin Barre – acoustic guitar, electric guitar
- Dave Pegg – backing vocals, bass guitar, mandolin
- Peter-John Vettese – backing vocals, keyboards, piano, synthesizer

Additional personnel

- Gerry Conway – drums, percussion
- Robin Black – sound engineering
- Jim Gibson – artwork
- Leigh Mantle – assistant engineer
- Iain McCaig – artwork, illustrations
- Paul Samwell-Smith – producer

== Charts ==
=== Weekly charts ===
1982 chart performance for The Broadsword and the Beast
Chart (1982)	Peak position
Australian Albums (Kent Music Report)	18
Austrian Albums (Ö3 Austria)	18
Canada Top Albums/CDs (RPM)	10
German Albums (Offizielle Top 100)	14
New Zealand Albums (RMNZ)	50
Norwegian Albums (VG-lista)	14
UK Albums (Official Charts)	27
US Billboard 200	19

2023 chart performance for The Broadsword and the Beast
Chart (2023)	Peak position
Belgian Albums (Ultratop Flanders)	63
Belgian Albums (Ultratop Wallonia)	151
Croatian International Albums (HDU)	7
Dutch Albums (Album Top 100)	85
German Albums (Offizielle Top 100)	4
Hungarian Physical Albums (MAHASZ)	11
Scottish Albums (Official Charts)	8
Spanish Albums (Promusicae)	57
Swiss Albums (Schweizer Hitparade)	15
UK Rock & Metal Albums (Official Charts)	2

=== Year-end charts ===
Year-end chart performance for The Broadsword and the Beast
Chart (1982)	Position
German Albums (Offizielle Top 100)	28

== Certifications ==
Certifications for The Broadsword and the Beast
Region	Certification	Certified units/sales
United Kingdom (BPI)	Silver	60,000^{^}
^{^} Shipments figures based on certification alone.
