= Peter-John Vettese =

- Also known as: Peter Vettese
- Born: Peter-John Vettese; 15 August 1956 (age 70); Scotland
- Genres: Progressive rock, pop
- Occupations: Musician, songwriter, arranger, producer
- Instrument: Keyboards
- Years active: 1965–present
- Label: Kobalt Music
- Formerly of: Jethro Tull
- Website: peterjohnvettese.co.uk

Peter-John Vettese (born 15 August 1956), also known as Peter Vettese, is a Scottish keyboardist, songwriter, arranger and record producer. Vettese was the keyboardist for progressive rock band Jethro Tull for most of the 1980s.

== Early life ==
Peter Vettese grew up in a musical family in Brechin, Angus, Scotland. He began his music studies with piano lessons at the age of 4. At 9, he began playing in public with his father's band. He left home at 17 to join one of the UK's biggest dance hall Big Bands, but was fired for rehearsing in company time with his own group. He then formed the jazz fusion group Solaris with guitarist Jim Condie, and toured Scotland and the US. He was playing in pubs and clubs in Scotland when he saw an advertisement for keyboard players in the music newspaper Melody Maker, which turned out to be from the progressive rock band Jethro Tull.

== Jethro Tull ==
Vettese joined Jethro Tull in 1982 for the recording of their album The Broadsword and the Beast, and toured with the band extensively for the next couple of years, appearing on the album Live at Hammersmith '84. Vettese made significant contributions to Tull's heavily electronic album Under Wraps (1984), toured with them again in 1986, and recorded as a guest musician on Rock Island (1989).

Vettese also collaborated with Tull's frontman Ian Anderson on Anderson's 1983 solo album, Walk into Light. Vettese co-wrote half the songs on the album, which is notable for his innovative contributions on electronic keyboards.

== Later career ==
Vettese began an independent career as a songwriter, arranger and producer. In the 1980s he worked with and produced a diverse range of artists including Cutting Crew, Frankie Goes to Hollywood, Go West, Pet Shop Boys, Bee Gees, Cher, Foreigner, Carly Simon and Clannad. In 1987, he fulfilled a boyhood dream to play with Paul McCartney as a session musician, but he later turned down an offer to become a member of McCartney's re-formed band Wings.

More recently he has worked with Box of Frogs, Simple Minds, Annie Lennox (the Grammy winning arrangement of "Walking on Broken Glass"), Zucchero, Simon Nicol, Peter Cox, Heather Small, Dido, Sophie B. Hawkins, Andy Leek, Beverley Knight, Hanne Boel, Gary Barlow, Mark Owen, Geri Halliwell, Melanie C, Nate James, Alex Parks, Darren Hayes, Robin Gibb (most notably on the album 50 St. Catherine's Drive) Laura Critchley, Peter Heppner and Spark.

Vettese is currently signed to Kobalt Music and has his own recording studio in Battersea where he also writes, produces, and records music for film soundtracks.

== Selected discography ==
=== With Jethro Tull ===
- The Broadsword and the Beast (1982)
- Under Wraps (1984)
- A Classic Case (1985)
- Rock Island (1989 - as guest member)

=== With Ian Anderson ===
- Walk into Light (1983)

=== With Bee Gees ===
- One (1989)
- Still Waters (1997)
- This Is Where I Came In (2001)

=== With Simple Minds ===
- Real Life (1991)

=== With Julian Lennon ===
- Everything Changes (2011)
- Jude (2022)

=== With Robin Gibb ===
- 50 St. Catherine's Drive (2014)
