= A New Day Yesterday (video) =

25th Anniversary Video

Video by Jethro Tull
- Released: 15 September 2003 (UK); January 13, 2004 (USA)
- Recorded: Various occasions from 1969 to 1994
- Genre: Progressive Rock
- Label: Chrysalis

Jethro Tull chronology
20 Years of Jethro Tull (1988)	25th Anniversary Video (2003)	Living with the Past (2002)

A New Day Yesterday also known as Jethro Tull: A New Day Yesterday – 25th Anniversary Collection, 1969–1994, is a stereo DVD remastering of the 25th Anniversary Video by Jethro Tull. The collection is named for the opening track from the band's 1969 album Stand Up.

== Track listing ==
- Introduction / Living In The Past (live) – Brussels 1993
- Nothing Is Easy (live) – Isle of Wight 1970
- 25th Anniversary Reunion
- Teacher (live) French TV 1970
- The Witch's Promise (live) – BBC Top Of The Pops 1970
- The Story Of The Hare Who Lost His Spectacles
- Minstrel In The Gallery (live) – Paris 1975
- Aqualung (live) – BBC Sight & Sound 1977
- Thick As A Brick Rehearsal/ Thick As . . . (live) – Madison Square Garden 1978
- Songs From The Wood (live) – London 1980
- Too Old To Rock N Roll . . . – Promo video clip 1980
- Kissing Willie – Promo video clip 1989
- 25th Anniversary Tour Rehearsals / My God
- Rocks On The Road – Promo video 1991
- A New Day Yesterday (live) – Promo video
- Teacher (live) – French TV 1970 [complete performance]
- The Witch's Promise (live) – BBC Top Of The Pops 1970 [complete performance]
- The Story Of The Hare Who Lost His Spectacles – Passion Play Tour 1973
- Aqualung (live) – BBC Sight & Sound 1977 [complete performance]
- Kissing Willie – full promo video 1989
- Rocks On The Road – full promo video 1991
- Living In The Past (live) – Brussels 1993 [complete performance]

== See also ==
- 20 Years of Jethro Tull (1988)
