= War Child (album) =

1974 studio album by Jethro Tull

Studio album by Jethro Tull
- Released: 14 October 1974
- Recorded: 7 December 1973 – 24 February 1974 at Morgan Studios, London, except track 6, 10 September 1972 and track 8, 15 September 1972, at the Château d'Hérouville, France
- Genres: Progressive rock; hard rock
- Length: 39:21
- Label: Chrysalis
- Producer: Ian Anderson

Jethro Tull chronology
A Passion Play (1973)	War Child (1974)	Minstrel in the Gallery (1975)

Singles from War Child
- 1. "Bungle in the Jungle" Released: 14 October 1974; 2. "Skating Away on the Thin Ice of the New Day" Released: 17 February 1975

War Child is the seventh studio album by Jethro Tull, released in October 1974. It was released almost a year and a half after the release of A Passion Play. The turmoil over criticism of the previous album surrounded the production of War Child, which obliged the band to do press conferences and explain their plans for the future.

== Recording ==
The band began recording songs for the album on 7 December 1973, starting with "Ladies". They recorded "The Third Hoorah" along with the outtake "Paradise Steakhouse" on 8 December, "War Child" and "Back-Door Angels" along with the outtake "Saturation" on 16 December, the sound effects from "Bungle in the Jungle", "Ladies", "Skating Away on the Thin Ice of the New Day" and "The Third Hoorah" along with the outtake "Good Godmother" and the orchestral piece "Mime Sequence" on 19 December, "Sea Lion" along with the outtake "Sea Lion II" on 6 January 1974, "Queen and Country" on 20 January 1974 and finally "Two Fingers" and "Bungle in the Jungle" along with the outtake "Tomorrow was Today" on 24 February 1974. The whole album was recorded at Morgan Studios, in London, except for tracks 6 and 8, which were recorded at the Château d'Hérouville, in France. According to the liner notes on the 2014 Theatre Edition reissue, War Child was a much more relaxed record to make, compared to the previous album and the Château d'Hérouville sessions. The studio equipment worked, the sound in the studio was very workable, and the atmosphere within the band was very settled and productive. "Only Solitaire" and "Skating Away" were recorded earlier, as detailed below.

== Music ==
Some of the music derived from past recording sessions of the band. "Only Solitaire" and "Skating Away on the Thin Ice of the New Day" were left over from the summer 1972 writing sessions for what was to have been the follow-up to Thick as a Brick (1972). The basic tracks and lead vocals for those two songs were recorded during September 1972 sessions in France. "Bungle in the Jungle" also shares some elements with material recorded in September 1972. Ian Anderson told Songfacts: "It was actually late '72 or early '73 when I was in Paris recording an album that never got released, although one or two of the tracks made it out in 1974, but that was at a time when I was writing an album that was exploring people, the human condition, through analogies with the animal kingdom." "Two Fingers" is a rearrangement of "Lick Your Fingers Clean", a track from the Aqualung (1971) recording sessions that was not included on that album's original release.

== Film ==
Originally meant to accompany a film project (the album was planned as a double-album set), it was reinstated as a ten-song, single-length rock album after failed attempts to find a major movie studio to finance the film. The "War Child" movie was written as a metaphysical black comedy concerning a teenage girl in the afterlife, meeting characters based on God, St. Peter and Lucifer portrayed as shrewd businessmen. Notable British actor Leonard Rossiter was to have been featured, Margot Fonteyn was to have choreographed, while Monty Python veteran John Cleese was pencilled in as a "humour consultant".

== Packaging ==
The front cover is a composite photograph featuring a positive colour print of Melbourne at night, and a negative print of a studio photo of lead singer Ian Anderson. The back cover of the album contains images of people, including the five members of the band, friends, wives, girlfriends, Chrysalis Records staff, and manager Terry Ellis, all related to the song titles. Anderson's personal touring assistant (and future wife) Shona Learoyd appears as a ringmaster, while Terry Ellis appears as a leopard skin-clad, umbrella-waving aggressive businessman.

== Music style and themes ==
The album prominently features Dee Palmer's string orchestration across an eclectic musical set, with the band members, as the two predecessor albums, playing a multitude of instruments. The music is lighter and more whimsical than the dark A Passion Play, with hints of comedy in the lyrics and the music's structure, although the lyrics still unleash lashing critiques of established society (as in "Queen and Country" and "Bungle in the Jungle"), religion ("Two Fingers") and critics ("Only Solitaire").

== Critical reception ==
Professional ratings
Review scores
Source	Rating
AllMusic	2.5/5 stars
The Encyclopedia of Popular Music	2/5 stars
Džuboks	(mixed)
Rolling Stone	(unfavourable)
Sputnik Music	2.5/5

The 1974 Rolling Stone review of the album is very harsh, as was the Rolling Stone review of A Passion Play: "Each handcrafted track comes chock-full of schmaltz, strings, tootie-fruitti sound effects and flute toots to boot, not to mention Anderson's warbling lyricism." Concluding, the reviewer said: "Remember: Tull rhymes with dull."

The AllMusic review, by Bruce Eder, recognizes the quality of the album and the musicians, but stated that: "[War Child] never made the impression of its predecessors, however, as it was a return to standard-length songs following two epic-length pieces. It was inevitable that the material would lack power, if only because the opportunity for development that gave Thick as a Brick and A Passion Play some of their power."

== Releases ==
Tracks slated to accompany the film such as "Quartet" and "Warchild Waltz" (called "Waltz of the Angels" on the Theatre Edition) were unearthed and released across several Tull compilations, and finally all of them appeared on the 2002 CD reissue.

In 2014, to commemorate the album's 40th anniversary, War Child: The 40th Anniversary Theatre Edition was released; a 2 CD/2 DVD, limited edition package, remixed by Steven Wilson containing unreleased tracks, a promo video of "The Third Hoorah", orchestral pieces that were originally written for the film project, a script synopsis and track-by-track annotations by Ian Anderson.

== Track listing ==
=== 1974 original release ===
All music is composed by Ian Anderson, except where noted.

Side one
No.	Title	Length
1.	"War Child"	4:35
2.	"Queen and Country"	3:00
3.	"Ladies"	3:17
4.	"Back-Door Angels"	5:30
5.	"Sealion"	3:37

Side two
No.	Title	Length
6.	"Skating Away on the Thin Ice of the New Day"	4:09
7.	"Bungle in the Jungle"	3:35
8.	"Only Solitaire"	1:38
9.	"The Third Hoorah"	4:49
10.	"Two Fingers"	5:11

=== 2002 remaster ===
The 2002 remaster added seven bonus tracks:
No.	Title	Length
11.	"Warchild Waltz" (called "Waltz of the Angels" on the 40th Anniversary Edition)	4:21
12.	"Quartet"	2:44
13.	"Paradise Steakhouse"	4:03
14.	"Sealion II" (Anderson, Jeffrey Hammond)	3:20
15.	"Rainbow Blues"	3:40
16.	"Glory Row"	3:35
17.	"Saturation"	4:21

=== 2014 The 40th Anniversary Theatre Edition ===
CD 1: Steven Wilson stereo remix of the album
No.	Title	Length
1.	"WarChild"	4:38
2.	"Queen and Country"	3:01
3.	"Ladies"	3:19
4.	"Back-Door Angels"	5:27
5.	"SeaLion"	3:42
6.	"Skating Away on the Thin Ice of the New Day"	4:12
7.	"Bungle in the Jungle"	3:41
8.	"Only Solitaire"	1:31
9.	"The Third Hoorah"	4:53
10.	"Two Fingers"	5:08

CD 2: Steven Wilson stereo remix of associated recordings (1–15)
No.	Title	Length
1.	"Paradise Steakhouse"	4:01
2.	"Saturation"	4:20
3.	"Good Godmother"	4:27
4.	"SeaLion II"	3:20
5.	"Quartet"	2:43
6.	"WarChild II"	3:14
7.	"Tomorrow Was Today"	3:54
8.	"Glory Row"	3:34
9.	"March, The Mad Scientist"	1:49
10.	"Rainbow Blues"	3:38
11.	"Pan Dance"	3:37
12.	"The Orchestral WarChild Theme"	9:34
13.	"The Third Hoorah" (Orchestral Version)	4:47
14.	"Mime Sequence"	7:08
15.	"Field Dance" (Conway Hall Version)	1:41
16.	"Waltz of the Angels" (Conway Hall Version)	4:23
17.	"The Beach (Part I)" (Morgan Master Recording)	3:20
18.	"The Beach (Part II)" (Morgan Master Recording)	1:01
19.	"Waltz of the Angels" (Morgan Demo Recording)	4:02
20.	"The Beach" (Morgan Demo Recording)	2:41
21.	"Field Dance" (Morgan Demo Recording)	1:05

*Tracks 12–21: orchestral recordings

DVD 1: Steven Wilson 5.1 surround and stereo mixes and flat transfers of the original quadrophonic and stereo album and video clips of a Montreux photosession and press conference on 11 January 1974 and The Third Hoorah promo footage with remixed stereo audio
No.	Title	Length
1.	"WarChild" (5.1 Surround Mix)	4:38
2.	"Queen and Country" (5.1 Surround Mix)	3:01
3.	"Ladies" (5.1 Surround Mix)	3:19
4.	"Back-Door Angels" (5.1 Surround Mix)	5:27
5.	"SeaLion" (5.1 Surround Mix)	3:42
6.	"Skating Away on the Thin Ice of the New Day" (5.1 Surround Mix)	4:12
7.	"Bungle in the Jungle" (5.1 Surround Mix)	3:41
8.	"Only Solitaire" (5.1 Surround Mix)	1:31
9.	"The Third Hoorah" (5.1 Surround Mix)	4:53
10.	"Two Fingers" (5.1 Surround Mix)	5:08
11.	"WarChild" (2014 Stereo Mix)	4:38
12.	"Queen and Country" (2014 Stereo Mix)	3:01
13.	"Ladies" (2014 Stereo Mix)	3:19
14.	"Back-Door Angels" (2014 Stereo Mix)	5:27
15.	"SeaLion" (2014 Stereo Mix)	3:42
16.	"Skating Away on the Thin Ice of the New Day" (2014 Stereo Mix)	4:12
17.	"Bungle in the Jungle" (2014 Stereo Mix)	3:41
18.	"Only Solitaire" (2014 Stereo Mix)	1:31
19.	"The Third Hoorah" (2014 Stereo Mix)	4:53
20.	"Two Fingers" (2014 Stereo Mix)	5:08
21.	"WarChild" (Original Stereo Mix)	4:38
22.	"Queen and Country" (Original Stereo Mix)	3:01
23.	"Ladies" (Original Stereo Mix)	3:19
24.	"Back-Door Angels" (Original Stereo Mix)	5:27
25.	"SeaLion" (Original Stereo Mix)	3:42
26.	"Skating Away on the Thin Ice of the New Day" (Original Stereo Mix)	4:12
27.	"Bungle in the Jungle" (Original Stereo Mix)	3:41
28.	"Only Solitaire" (Original Stereo Mix)	1:31
29.	"The Third Hoorah" (Original Stereo Mix)	4:53
30.	"Two Fingers" (Original Stereo Mix)	5:08
31.	"WarChild" (Original Quadrophonic Mix)	4:38
32.	"Queen and Country" (Original Quadrophonic Mix)	3:01
33.	"Ladies" (Original Quadrophonic Mix)	3:19
34.	"Back-Door Angels" (Original Quadrophonic Mix)	5:27
35.	"SeaLion" (Original Quadrophonic Mix)	3:42
36.	"Skating Away on the Thin Ice of the New Day" (Original Quadrophonic Mix)	4:12
37.	"Bungle in the Jungle" (Original Quadrophonic Mix)	3:41
38.	"Only Solitaire" (Original Quadrophonic Mix)	1:31
39.	"The Third Hoorah" (Original Quadrophonic Mix)	4:53
40.	"Two Fingers" (Original Quadrophonic Mix)	5:08
41.	"Glory Row" (Original Quadrophonic Mix)	3:34
42.	"March, The Mad Scientist" (Original Quadrophonic Mix)	1:49
43.	"Video clip from a Montreux photosession and press conference on 11 January 1974"
44.	"The Third Hoorah promo footage with remixed stereo audio"

DVD 2: Steven Wilson 5.1 surround and stereo mixes of associated recordings and original Robin Black stereo mixes of six additional orchestral recordings
No.	Title	Length
1.	"Paradise Steakhouse" (5.1 Surround Mix)	4:01
2.	"Saturation" (5.1 Surround Mix)	4:20
3.	"Good Godmother" (5.1 Surround Mix)	4:27
4.	"SeaLion II" (5.1 Surround Mix)	3:20
5.	"Quartet" (5.1 Surround Mix)	2:43
6.	"WarChild II" (5.1 Surround Mix)	3:14
7.	"Tomorrow Was Today" (5.1 Surround Mix)	3:54
8.	"Glory Row" (5.1 Surround Mix)	3:34
9.	"March, The Mad Scientist" (5.1 Surround Mix)	1:49
10.	"Rainbow Blues" (5.1 Surround Mix)	3:38
11.	"Pan Dance" (5.1 Surround Mix)	3:37
12.	"The Orchestral WarChild Theme" (5.1 Surround Mix)	9:34
13.	"The Third Hoorah" (Orchestral Version) (5.1 Surround Mix)	4:47
14.	"Mime Sequence" (5.1 Surround Mix)	7:08
15.	"Field Dance" (Conway Hall Version) (5.1 Surround Mix)	1:41
16.	"Paradise Steakhouse" (2014 Stereo Mix)	4:01
17.	"Saturation" (2014 Stereo Mix)	4:20
18.	"Good Godmother" (2014 Stereo Mix)	4:27
19.	"SeaLion II" (2014 Stereo Mix)	3:20
20.	"Quartet" (2014 Stereo Mix)	2:43
21.	"WarChild II" (2014 Stereo Mix)	3:14
22.	"Tomorrow Was Today" (2014 Stereo Mix)	3:54
23.	"Glory Row" (2014 Stereo Mix)	3:34
24.	"March, The Mad Scientist" (2014 Stereo Mix)	1:49
25.	"Rainbow Blues" (2014 Stereo Mix)	3:38
26.	"Pan Dance" (2014 Stereo Mix)	3:37
27.	"The Orchestral WarChild Theme" (2014 Stereo Mix)	9:34
28.	"The Third Hoorah" (Orchestral Version) (2014 Stereo Mix)	4:47
29.	"Mime Sequence" (2014 Stereo Mix)	7:08
30.	"Field Dance" (Conway Hall Version) (2014 Stereo Mix)	1:41
31.	"Waltz of the Angels" (Conway Hall Version) (Original Stereo Mix)	4:23
32.	"The Beach (Part I)" (Morgan Master Recording) (Original Stereo Mix)	3:20
33.	"The Beach (Part II)" (Morgan Master Recording) (Original Stereo Mix)	1:01
34.	"Waltz of the Angels" (Morgan Demo Recording) (Original Stereo Mix)	4:02
35.	"The Beach" (Morgan Demo Recording) (Original Stereo Mix)	2:41
36.	"Field Dance" (Morgan Demo Recording) (Original Stereo Mix)	1:05

== Personnel ==
Jethro Tull

- Ian Anderson – vocals, flute, acoustic guitar, alto, soprano and sopranino saxophones
- Martin Barre – electric guitar, Spanish guitar
- John Evan – piano, organ, synthesizers, accordion
- Jeffrey Hammond – lead vocals and spoken word (on "Sealion II"), bass guitar, string bass
- Barriemore Barlow – drums, percussion, glockenspiel, marimba

Additional personnel

- Dee Palmer – orchestral arrangements
- Robin Black – sound engineer
- Terry Ellis – executive producer

== Charts ==
Chart (1974)	Peak position
Australian Albums (Kent Music Report)	9
Canada Top Albums/CDs (RPM)	3
Danish Albums (Tracklisten	9
French Albums (SNEP)	15
Finnish Albums (The Official Finnish Charts)	20
German Albums (Offizielle Top 100)	27
Italian Albums (Musica e Dischi)	7
Norwegian Albums (VG-lista)	8
UK Albums (Official Charts)	14
US Billboard 200	2

Chart (2014)	Peak position
UK Rock & Metal Albums (Official Charts)	14

Chart (2026)	Peak position
Croatian International Albums (HDU)	40

== Certifications ==
Region	Certification	Certified units/sales
Australia (ARIA)	Gold	20,000^{^}
United States (RIAA)	Gold	500,000^{^}
^{^} Shipments figures based on certification alone.
