= A Passion Play =

1973 album by Jethro Tull

Studio album by Jethro Tull
- Released: 13 July 1973
- Recorded: September 1972 – March 1973
- Studios: Morgan Studios, London
- Genre: Progressive rock
- Length: 45:07 (original release); 45:37 (2014 remix)
- Label: Chrysalis
- Producer: Ian Anderson

Jethro Tull chronology
| Living in the Past (1972) | A Passion Play (1973) | War Child (1974) |

Singles from A Passion Play
- 1. "A Passion Play [Edit #8]" Released: May 1973; 2. "A Passion Play [Edit #10]" Released: August 1973

A Passion Play is the sixth studio album by British progressive rock band Jethro Tull, released in July 1973 on Chrysalis Records.

Following in the same style as the band's previous album Thick as a Brick (1972), A Passion Play is a concept album comprising individual songs arranged into a single continuous piece of music (which was split into two parts across the original vinyl release's two sides). The album's concept follows the spiritual journey of a recently deceased man in the afterlife, exploring themes of morality, religion and good and evil. The album's accompanying tour was considered the high water mark of Jethro Tull's elaborate stage productions, involving a full performance of the album accompanied by physical props, sketches and projected video.

A Passion Play was negatively received by critics upon its initial release. However the album was a commercial success, becoming Jethro Tull's second number-one album in the United States. The album has since received a more positive critical reassessment, and has become a cult favorite among some fans of the band.

== Background ==
Following the release of the critically and commercially successful Thick as a Brick in 1972, Jethro Tull made the decision to record their next album at the Château d'Hérouville studios in Hérouville, France, known in the 1970s for being frequented by artists such as Pink Floyd, Elton John and T. Rex. The band were persuaded by their management and accountants to record their next album in tax exile outside of the UK in order to avoid what Anderson described as "a pretty scary tax regime" of the time. The band planned to make a double album, with concepts as varied as the meaning of life, music criticism and the comparison between the man and animal world.

Upon arrival at the Château, however, the band faced a variety of challenges which made the recording sessions difficult, ranging from technical issues with the studio equipment to bug-infested beds and food poisoning epidemics, causing Anderson to give the Château the nickname "Château d'Isaster" Although the band had recorded enough material to fill three sides of the intended double album, the issues living in the studio convinced the band to abandon the sessions and leave the Château. The band considered moving the album's production to Switzerland, for they had just recently been granted Swiss citizenship; however, the decision was ultimately made to return to the UK and completely restart writing and recording of the album (although two tracks from the Château d'Hérouville sessions were later included on the band's 1974 album War Child).

== Recording ==
Upon returning to the UK, the band began sessions for A Passion Play at Morgan Studios, the same studio where they had recorded most of their last four albums. Anderson felt that "it was better to start again and write a whole new album, instead of trying to somehow regenerate everybody's interest and commitment to something that had already struggled", in reference to the abandoned Château sessions and the decision to start over with new material. The album was written and recorded quickly, as the band had little time before their next tour began. As a result, recording sessions were often lengthy, in some cases lasting all night. Guitarist Martin Barre recalled the sessions as being "long" and "very intense" with Anderson stating that the album needed to be "written and recorded in one block, very quickly". The concept and most of the music were written in the studio by Anderson, with occasional contributions from other members of the band.

== Musical style ==
Continuing the progressive rock style previously explored by the band on Thick as a Brick, A Passion Play featured the band playing a multitude of instruments, heavily toned with dominating minor key variation, resulting in an album described by author Martin Webb as "quasi prog-rock with complex time-signatures, complex lyrics and, well, complex everything, really". The spoken word piece "The Story of the Hare Who Lost His Spectacles", has its relations in musical terms with Prokofiev’s Peter and the Wolf. Bruce Eder describes Anderson's singing in biblical-sounding references, interwoven with modern language as a sort of a rock equivalent to T.S. Eliot's The Waste Land with the music a "dazzling mix of old English folk and classical material, reshaped in electric rock terms". The album is notable for heavily featuring soprano saxophone played by Anderson, often in place of his famous flute playing. Anderson expressed distaste for the instrument, saying that "It wasn't difficult to learn to play it a bit, but I didn't practice enough, I wasn't trained and it hurt my lip. I hated the fiddling about with reeds, the fact that it was all wet and soggy, straight off I really didn't enjoy playing the instrument."

== Concept ==
=== Background ===
A Passion Play borrows its title from passion plays which depict the Passion of Jesus Christ, though the title is evidently ironic, since the lyrics at first appears to present a generically Christian view of the afterlife but then rejects Christian theological conclusions. A Passion Play is described in its album liner notes as though it were a staged theatrical "play" in four acts. Of this album, "the lyrics themselves are extremely complicated, the story is often unclear, and much is left to the individual's interpretation". Knowledge of the characters and setting actually comes less from the lyrics themselves and more from the few brief words in the satirical, six-page "Linwell Theatre programme" included in the original album packaging, which features photos of the band members listed alongside fake names and biographies as the "actors" of the play, including Rena Sanderone (an anagram of "Eean Anderrson") as the playwright. A basic narrative plot can be loosely interpreted from the lyrics, liner notes, and "programme" of A Passion Play, centering on everyman protagonist Ronnie Pilgrim, who is named only in the programme.

Anderson described his conceptual inspiration for A Passion Play as:

A fascination that I had about the possibility of a hereafter, that touches upon the conventions of popular religion, and Christianity in particular. It recognizes that age-old conflict between good and bad, God and the Devil, and tries to bring it to some theatrical life, to give character, to give expression, to give... I suppose a sense of vulnerability and less than perfect sense regarding the identities of the personifications of good and evil. But basically it's a kind of slightly tongue-in-cheek look at what might happen when you die.

=== Plot synopsis ===
Ronnie Pilgrim recognises his own death and, in ghostly form, attends his own funeral, before traversing a purgatorial desert and "icy wastes", where he is visited by a smiling angel guide (Act 1). Pilgrim is next admitted into a video viewing room by a Peter Dejour, and events of Pilgrim's life are replayed by a projectionist before a demanding jury. After a long-winded and bizarre evaluation process, the sardonic jury concludes that they "won't cross [Pilgrim] out", suggesting that he has led a mostly decent life and so will be admitted into Heaven, which corresponds with the sudden start of a cheerful "Forest Dance" melody (Act 2).

At this time, the main plot is interrupted by an unrelated, spoken-word comedic interlude (narrated by Jeffrey Hammond with an exaggerated Lancashire accent) backed by instrumentation. Presented as an absurd fable, the interlude details (with much wordplay) the failure of a group of anthropomorphic animals to help a hare find his missing eyeglasses.

The "Forest Dance" melody resumes, and Ronnie Pilgrim now appears in Heaven, two days after his judgment at the viewing room, communicating two unexpected thoughts: "I'll go to the foot of our stairs" (an expression of surprise) and "pie in the sky" (an expression of scepticism about the fulfilment of a reward). Pilgrim's dissatisfaction with Heaven appears to be linked to its mundane atmosphere where most of its residents endlessly reminisce, chronically obsessing over the living. Therefore, unable to adapt, Pilgrim goes to G. Oddie & Son to frankly request a relocation to Hell, feeling that he has a "right to be wrong". Descending into Hell, Pilgrim is confronted by Lucifer (named "Lucy" in the album's fictitious programme), who asserts his cold authority as Pilgrim's "overseer" (Act 3). Pilgrim immediately finds Hell even worse than Heaven and flees, understanding himself now as neither completely good nor evil, wishing that he could trade his "halo for a horn and the horn for the hat I once had". He speaks with a Magus Perdé about his dilemma and, having sampled and rejected both extremes of his afterlife options, he finally stands on a Stygian shore as a "voyager into life". On this beach, other people and animals also prepare to "renew the pledge of life's long song". The final triumphant lyrics include the phrases "ever-burning fire", "ever-door", "ever-life", and moving "from the dark into ever-day", so that the play concludes with a strong implication of eternal rebirth (Act 4).

== Reception ==
Professional ratings
Review scores
| Source | Rating |
|---|---|
| AllMusic | 3/5 stars |
| The Encyclopedia of Popular Music | 2/5 stars |
| The Rolling Stone Album Guide | 3/5 stars |
| Sea of Tranquility | 5/5 stars |

Upon its original release, it received generally negative reviews. Stephen Holden, writing for Rolling Stone, was broadly negative, saying that the album "strangles under the tonnage of its pretensions — a jumble of anarchic, childishly precocious gestures that are intellectually and emotionally faithless to any idea other than their own esoteric non-logic"; feeling, overall, that, despite the band being "truly virtuosic in the manner of a polished chamber ensemble" and some moments, such as "those interludes that feature Anderson’s extraordinary flute playing" and two "short pastoral sections" that were "especially lovely", the album was "expensive, tedious nonsense". New Musical Express considered the album as "the fall" of Jethro Tull. Even Chris Welch of Melody Maker had a bad impression, stating "Music must touch the soul. A Passion Play rattles with emptiness". Lester Bangs, writing for Creem Magazine, stated that he became "totally bamboozled" after hearing the album. Bangs concluded: "I almost like it, even though it sort of irritates me. Maybe I like it because it irritates me. But that's my problem". Record World said that "the music is expectedly rich and imaginative, if somewhat challenging."

Despite the reviews, A Passion Play sold well enough to reach No. 1 on the charts in the United States and Canada. The album also had good sales in Germany and Norway, where it reached No. 5. In the United Kingdom it reached No. 16. The 2013 box A Passion Play: an Extended Performance achieved the Nº 48 in the Top Rock Albums.

=== Legacy ===
Jethro Tull's business manager, Terry Ellis, announced in Melody Maker that the band would retire from live performances in response to negative reviews of the album and concerts. This was just a publicity stunt of which the band had no knowledge; Anderson felt it made them look petulant and brought them the wrong sort of publicity.

A three-star retrospective review by Bruce Eder for AllMusic was gentle in its judgement, saying that "the music puts it over successfully, a dazzling mix of old English folk and classical material, reshaped in electric rock terms. The band is at its peak form, sustaining the tension and anticipation of this album-length piece across 45 minutes, although the music runs out of inspiration about five minutes before it actually ends". PopMatters ranked A Passion Play the 17th best progressive rock album of all time.

Paul Stump, in his History of Progressive Rock, said that "the writing is militantly episodic", with some beautiful moments but an overemphasis on novelty and an overall incoherent sequence of themes that makes the album bemusing and disorienting rather than engaging to the listener.

Some members of the band, in retrospect, expressed distaste for the album, including Anderson, saying that "I've always thought that A Passion Play suffered more than any other album I've ever made from being over-arranged and over-produced and over-cooked" and that Jethro Tull fans who call the album their favourite album of all time "should of course remain in the establishment for the criminally insane in which they probably already reside". Barre has said that he believes that the album exists in "the bottom third of Jethro Tull albums".

== Releases ==
Subsequent to the original 1973 release, the album was released on CD. Later, in March 1998 Mobile Fidelity Sound Lab released a CD, which indexed tracks along the lines of, but not quite matching, the radio-station promo (see below) and in 2003 a remastered CD version with an additional video track was released.

On the original release of the album, side one ends in the middle of "The Story of the Hare Who Lost His Spectacles" (it is the same end on track 1 of the original CD release). The sound at the end of side one was a nod to children storytelling records which signalled the child or parent to flip the record over. Side two begins where it left off. However, on the 2003 remastered CD, the second part begins with the full story so that it does not get cut off in the middle.

In 2014, commemorating the 40th anniversary (slightly belated) of the album, it was released a box called A Passion Play: An Extended Performance, which contains the complete Chateau d’Herouville sessions and brand-new mix by Steven Wilson. This version also includes an additional verse not on the original release of "The Foot Of Our Stairs". It extends the track about another 45 seconds. The DVDs also include the video clips of stage intro film and "The Hare Who Lost His Spectacles". The discs are packaged in a box set along with a book featuring interviews with Wilson, dancer Jane Eve, spun man Chris Amson, plus the memoirs of the Reverend Godfrey Pilchard.

=== Chateau D'Isaster recordings ===
Early concepts for the album were developed at the recording studio Château d'Hérouville, which the band, due to difficulties at the studio, playfully referred to as "Chateau D'Isaster". Previously unreleased recordings from these sessions were first offered to public under the title "The Chateau D'Isaster Tapes" on the 1988 compilation 20 Years of Jethro Tull (three recordings) and then in the 1993 compilation Nightcap: The Unreleased Masters 1973–1991. Nightcap included almost all the recordings with additional flute solos by Ian Anderson.

The full recordings (Note: Except for "The Hare...", which was originally part of the third side and subsequently pasted into the Passion Play album) were released in 2014, in the box A Passion Play: An Extended Performance. The box contains previously unreleased tracks such as "Sailor" and "The Big Top" along with the aforementioned "Skating Away" and "Critique Oblique".

== Track listing ==
These titles were provided by Anderson for the 1973 DJ pressing of the LP, though they were not included for the standard pressing. The gold Ultradisc Original Master Recording CD of Mobile Fidelity Sound Lab (1998) contains cueable tracks for each title, but the standard CD releases contain only one or two tracks, depending on the version.

All songs written by Ian Anderson unless stated otherwise.

=== 1973 original release ===
Side one
| No. | Title | Length |
|---|---|---|
| 1. | "A Passion Play, part I I. "Act 1: Ronnie Pilgrim's Funeral — a winter's morning in the cemetery" a. "Lifebeats" (Instrumental) b. "Prelude" (Instrumental) c. "The Silver Cord" d. "Re-Assuring Tune" (Instrumental) II. "Act 2: The Memory Bank — a small but comfortable theatre with a cinema-screen (the next morning)" a. "Memory Bank" b. "Best Friends" c. "Critique Oblique" d. "Forest Dance #1" (Instrumental) III. "Interlude: The Story of the Hare Who Lost His Spectacles" a. "The Story of the Hare Who Lost His Spectacles" (Jeffrey Hammond, John Evan, Ian Anderson) | 23:09 9:08: 1:14; 2:14; 4:29; 1:11; 12:31: 4:20; 1:58; 4:38; 1:35; 1:30: 1:30 |

Side two
| No. | Title | Length |
|---|---|---|
| 2. | "A Passion Play, part II I. "Interlude: The Story of the Hare Who Lost His Spectacles" a. "The Story of the Hare Who Lost His Spectacles" (Hammond, Evan, Anderson) II. "Act 3: The Business Office of G. Oddie & Son (two days later)" a. "Forest Dance #2" (Instrumental) b. "The Foot of Our Stairs" c. "Overseer Overture" III. "Act 4: Magus Perdé's Drawing Room at Midnight" a. "Flight from Lucifer" b. "10:08 to Paddington" (Instrumental) c. "Magus Perdé" d. "Epilogue" | 21:58 2:48: 2:48; 9:30: 1:12; 4:18; 4:00; 9:40: 3:58; 1:04; 3:55; 0:43 |
| Total length: | | 45:07 |

=== 1998 Ultradisc Original Master Recording Gold CD (Mobile Fidelity Sound Lab UDCD 720) ===
Gold CD Edition
| No. | Title | Length |
|---|---|---|
| 1. | "Lifebeats" | 1:14 |
| 2. | "Prelude" | 2:14 |
| 3. | "The Silver Cord" | 4:29 |
| 4. | "Re-Assuring Tune" | 1:11 |
| 5. | "Memory Bank" | 4:20 |
| 6. | "Best Friends" | 1:58 |
| 7. | "Critique Oblique" | 4:38 |
| 8. | "Forest Dance No. 1" | 1:35 |
| 9. | "The Story of the Hare Who Lost His Spectacles" | 4:18 |
| 10. | "Forest Dance No. 2" | 1:12 |
| 11. | "The Foot of Our Stairs" | 4:18 |
| 12. | "Overseer Overture" | 4:00 |
| 13. | "Flight from Lucifer" | 3:58 |
| 14. | "10:08 to Paddington" | 1:04 |
| 15. | "Magus Perdé" | 3:55 |
| 16. | "Epilogue" | 0:43 |

=== 2003 Remastered 30th Anniversary Edition ===
The same listing from 1998 with a Quick Time video
| No. | Title | Notes | Length |
|---|---|---|---|
| 1. | "The Story of the Hare Who Lost His Spectacles" | The 2003 release includes this additional 7-minute QuickTime video, which was used in the original APP concerts. |

=== 2014 An Extended Performance ===
CD 1: Steven Wilson stereo remix of the album
| No. | Title | Length |
|---|---|---|
| 1. | "Lifebeats / Prelude (Instrumental)" | 3:24 |
| 2. | "The Silver Cord" | 4:28 |
| 3. | "Re-Assuring Tune (Instrumental)" | 1:11 |
| 4. | "Memory Bank" | 4:20 |
| 5. | "Best Friends" | 1:56 |
| 6. | "Critique Oblique" | 4:35 |
| 7. | "Forest Dance #1 (Instrumental)" | 1:34 |
| 8. | "The Story of the Hare Who Lost His Spectacles" | 4:10 |
| 9. | "Forest Dance #2 (Instrumental)" | 1:12 |
| 10. | "The Foot of Our Stairs" | 5:08 |
| 11. | "Overseer Overture" | 3:58 |
| 12. | "Flight from Lucifer" | 3:56 |
| 13. | "10:08 to Paddington" | 1:04 |
| 14. | "Magus Perdé" | 3:53 |
| 15. | "Epilogue (Instrumental)" | 0:44 |

CD 2: Steven Wilson stereo remix of The Château d'Hérouville Sessions
| No. | Title | Length |
|---|---|---|
| 1. | "The Big Top" | 3:05 |
| 2. | "Scenario" | 3:25 |
| 3. | "Audition" | 2:33 |
| 4. | "Skating Away on the Thin Ice of the New Day" | 3:27 |
| 5. | "Sailor" | 3:10 |
| 6. | "No Rehearsal" | 5:09 |
| 7. | "Left Right" | 5:02 |
| 8. | "Only Solitaire" | 1:28 |
| 9. | "Critique Oblique (Part I)" | 8:50 |
| 10. | "Critique Oblique (Part II)" | 5:28 |
| 11. | "Animelee (1st Dance) (Instrumental)" | 3:36 |
| 12. | "Animelee (2nd Dance) (Instrumental)" | 1:34 |
| 13. | "Law of the Bungle (Part I)" | 5:08 |
| 14. | "Tiger Toon" | 2:31 |
| 15. | "Law of the Bungle (Part II)" | 5:28 |

DVD 1: Steven Wilson 5.1 surround and stereo mixes and flat transfer of the original stereo mix of the album and video clips of The Story of the Hare Who Lost His Spectacles and intro and outro film footage used in the 1973 tour
| No. | Title | Length |
|---|---|---|
| 1. | "Lifebeats / Prelude" (5.1 Surround Mix) | 3:24 |
| 2. | "The Silver Cord" (5.1 Surround Mix) | 4:28 |
| 3. | "Re-Assuring Tune (Instrumental)" (5.1 Surround Mix) | 1:11 |
| 4. | "Memory Bank" (5.1 Surround Mix) | 4:20 |
| 5. | "Best Friends" (5.1 Surround Mix) | 1:56 |
| 6. | "Critique Oblique" (5.1 Surround Mix) | 4:35 |
| 7. | "Forest Dance #1" (5.1 Surround Mix) | 1:34 |
| 8. | "The Story of the Hare Who Lost His Spectacles" (5.1 Surround Mix) | 4:10 |
| 9. | "Forest Dance #2" (5.1 Surround Mix) | 1:12 |
| 10. | "The Foot of Our Stairs" (5.1 Surround Mix) | 5:08 |
| 11. | "Overseer Overture" (5.1 Surround Mix) | 3:58 |
| 12. | "Flight from Lucifer" (5.1 Surround Mix) | 3:56 |
| 13. | "10:08 to Paddington" (5.1 Surround Mix) | 1:04 |
| 14. | "Magus Perdé" (5.1 Surround Mix) | 3:53 |
| 15. | "Epilogue" (5.1 Surround Mix) | 0:44 |
| 16. | "Lifebeats / Prelude" (2014 Stereo Mix) | 3:24 |
| 17. | "The Silver Cord" (2014 Stereo Mix) | 4:28 |
| 18. | "Re-Assuring Tune" (2014 Stereo Mix) | 1:11 |
| 19. | "Memory Bank" (2014 Stereo Mix) | 4:20 |
| 20. | "Best Friends" (2014 Stereo Mix) | 1:56 |
| 21. | "Critique Oblique" (2014 Stereo Mix) | 4:35 |
| 22. | "Forest Dance #1" (2014 Stereo Mix) | 1:34 |
| 23. | "The Story of the Hare Who Lost His Spectacles" (2014 Stereo Mix) | 4:10 |
| 24. | "Forest Dance #2" (2014 Stereo Mix) | 1:12 |
| 25. | "The Foot of Our Stairs" (2014 Stereo Mix) | 5:08 |
| 26. | "Overseer Overture" (2014 Stereo Mix) | 3:58 |
| 27. | "Flight from Lucifer" (2014 Stereo Mix) | 3:56 |
| 28. | "10:08 to Paddington" (2014 Stereo Mix) | 1:04 |
| 29. | "Magus Perdé" (2014 Stereo Mix) | 3:53 |
| 30. | "Epilogue" (2014 Stereo Mix) | 0:44 |
| 31. | "Lifebeats / Prelude" (Original Stereo Mix) | 3:24 |
| 32. | "The Silver Cord" (Original Stereo Mix) | 4:28 |
| 33. | "Re-Assuring Tune" (Original Stereo Mix) | 1:11 |
| 34. | "Memory Bank" (Original Stereo Mix) | 4:20 |
| 35. | "Best Friends" (Original Stereo Mix) | 1:56 |
| 36. | "Critique Oblique" (Original Stereo Mix) | 4:35 |
| 37. | "Forest Dance #1" (Original Stereo Mix) | 1:34 |
| 38. | "The Story of the Hare Who Lost His Spectacles" (Original Stereo Mix) | 4:10 |
| 39. | "Forest Dance #2" (Original Stereo Mix) | 1:12 |
| 40. | "The Foot of Our Stairs" (Original Stereo Mix) | 5:08 |
| 41. | "Overseer Overture" (Original Stereo Mix) | 3:58 |
| 42. | "Flight from Lucifer" (Original Stereo Mix) | 3:56 |
| 43. | "10:08 to Paddington" (Original Stereo Mix) | 1:04 |
| 44. | "Magus Perdé" (Original Stereo Mix) | 3:53 |
| 45. | "Epilogue" (Original Stereo Mix) | 0:44 |
| 46. | "The Story of the Hare Who Lost His Spectacles video clip from the 1973 tour" |
| 47. | "Intro and outro video clip from the 1973 tour" |

DVD 2: Steven Wilson 5.1 surround and stereo mixes of The Château d'Hérouville Sessions
| No. | Title | Length |
|---|---|---|
| 1. | "The Big Top" (5.1 Surround Mix) | 3:05 |
| 2. | "Scenario" (5.1 Surround Mix) | 3:25 |
| 3. | "Audition" (5.1 Surround Mix) | 2:33 |
| 4. | "Skating Away on the Thin Ice of the New Day" (5.1 Surround Mix) | 3:27 |
| 5. | "Sailor" (5.1 Surround Mix) | 3:10 |
| 6. | "No Rehearsal" (5.1 Surround Mix) | 5:09 |
| 7. | "Left Right" (5.1 Surround Mix) | 5:02 |
| 8. | "Only Solitaire" (5.1 Surround Mix) | 1:28 |
| 9. | "Critique Oblique (Part I)" (5.1 Surround Mix) | 8:50 |
| 10. | "Critique Oblique (Part II)" (5.1 Surround Mix) | 5:28 |
| 11. | "Animelee (1st Dance)" (5.1 Surround Mix) | 3:36 |
| 12. | "Animelee (2nd Dance)" (5.1 Surround Mix) | 1:34 |
| 13. | "Law of the Bungle (Part I)" (5.1 Surround Mix) | 5:08 |
| 14. | "Tiger Toon" (5.1 Surround Mix) | 2:31 |
| 15. | "Law of the Bungle (Part II)" (5.1 Surround Mix) | 5:28 |
| 16. | "The Big Top" (2014 Stereo Mix) | 3:05 |
| 17. | "Scenario" (2014 Stereo Mix) | 3:25 |
| 18. | "Audition" (2014 Stereo Mix) | 2:33 |
| 19. | "Skating Away on the Thin Ice of the New Day" (2014 Stereo Mix) | 3:27 |
| 20. | "Sailor" (2014 Stereo Mix) | 3:10 |
| 21. | "No Rehearsal" (2014 Stereo Mix) | 5:09 |
| 22. | "Left Right" (2014 Stereo Mix) | 5:02 |
| 23. | "Only Solitaire" (2014 Stereo Mix) | 1:28 |
| 24. | "Critique Oblique (Part I)" (2014 Stereo Mix) | 8:50 |
| 25. | "Critique Oblique (Part II)" (2014 Stereo Mix) | 5:28 |
| 26. | "Animelee (1st Dance)" (2014 Stereo Mix) | 3:36 |
| 27. | "Animelee (2nd Dance)" (2014 Stereo Mix) | 1:34 |
| 28. | "Law of the Bungle (Part I)" (2014 Stereo Mix) | 5:08 |
| 29. | "Tiger Toon" (2014 Stereo Mix) | 2:31 |
| 30. | "Law of the Bungle (Part II)" (2014 Stereo Mix) | 5:28 |

== Personnel ==
Jethro Tull

- Ian Anderson – lead vocals, flute, acoustic guitar, soprano and sopranino saxophone
- Martin Barre – electric guitar
- John Evan – backing vocals, piano, organ, synthesizer
- Jeffrey Hammond – bass guitar, spoken word (on "The Story of the Hare Who Lost His Spectacles")
- Barriemore Barlow – drums, percussion, timpani, glockenspiel, marimba

Additional personnel

- Dee Palmer – orchestral arrangements
- Robin Black – sound engineer
- Terry Ellis – executive producer
- Brian Ward – photography

== Charts ==
=== Weekly charts ===
| Chart (1973) | Peak position |
|---|---|
| Australian Albums (Kent Music Report) | 9 |
| Austrian Albums (Ö3 Austria) | 4 |
| Canada Top Albums/CDs (RPM) | 1 |
| Danish Albums (Hitlisten) | 4 |
| Finnish Albums (The Official Finnish Charts) | 6 |
| German Albums (Offizielle Top 100) | 5 |
| Italian Albums (Musica e Dischi) | 5 |
| Norwegian Albums (VG-lista) | 5 |
| UK Albums (Official Charts) | 16 |
| US Billboard 200 | 1 |

| Chart (2014) | Peak position |
|---|---|
| Scottish Albums (Official Charts) | 94 |
| UK Albums (Official Charts) | 93 |
| UK Rock & Metal Albums (Official Charts) | 7 |

=== Year-end charts ===
| Chart (1973) | Position |
|---|---|
| German Albums (Offizielle Top 100) | 46 |

== Certifications ==
| Region | Certification | Certified units/sales |
|---|---|---|
| United Kingdom (BPI) | Silver | 60,000^{^} |
| United States (RIAA) | Gold | 500,000^{^} |
^{^} Shipments figures based on certification alone.

== Sources ==
- Smolko, Tim (2013). Jethro Tull's Thick as a Brick and A Passion Play: Inside Two Long Songs. Profiles in Popular Music. ISBN 9780253010315.
