= Under Wraps (Jethro Tull album) =

1984 studio album by Jethro Tull

Studio album by Jethro Tull
- Released: 7 September 1984
- Recorded: 1984
- Studios: Ian Anderson's home studio, Buckinghamshire, England
- Genres: Electronic rock; progressive rock
- Length: 43:13 (Vinyl); 58:39 (CD)
- Label: Chrysalis
- Producer: Ian Anderson

Jethro Tull chronology
The Broadsword and the Beast (1982)	Under Wraps (1984)	A Classic Case (1985)

Singles from Under Wraps
- 1. "Lap of Luxury" Released: August 1984

Professional ratings
Review scores
Source	Rating
Allmusic	1/5 stars
The Encyclopedia of Popular Music	2/5 stars

Under Wraps is the fifteenth studio album by the band Jethro Tull, released on 7 September 1984 on Chrysalis Records.

The album saw the band take a radical departure from its previous work, adopting a heavily electronic rock sound dominated by keyboards and synthesizers. The album's subject matter and lyrics were also a departure from the typical fantasy fare of prior Tull albums, instead exploring Cold War and espionage themes, influenced by bandleader Ian Anderson's love of spy fiction. Unlike most Tull albums, other members of the band beyond Anderson contributed heavily to the writing process, particularly keyboardist Peter-John Vettese, who is credited as a co-writer on a majority of the album's tracks. The CD version of the album features an additional four tracks not included on the vinyl track listing.

Under Wraps peaked at number 18 on the UK Albums Chart and number 76 on the US Billboard 200. The album received poor reviews from critics upon release and was highly polarizing among fans due to its markedly different sound; the album's use of a drum machine in place of a live drummer was particularly controversial. The band have offered various views on the album since its release: Anderson has described the album as "an experiment, and not everyone was ready for that kind of change from Jethro Tull", bassist Dave Pegg has been quoted as saying that the tracks cut from the sessions for The Broadsword and the Beast (1982) would have made a better album, while guitarist Martin Barre has referred to it as one of his favourite Tull albums.

A reissue box set featuring full remixes of the album by Bruce Soord, including a mix with newly replaced drum samples, was released in 2026.

== Release ==
The original 1984 release had 11 tracks, with "Astronomy", "Tundra", "Automotive Engineering" and "General Crossing" only appearing on the cassette version. Of these extra tracks, "General Crossing" became the first Jethro Tull track never to be released on vinyl, as "Astronomy", "Tundra" and "Automotive Engineering" all appeared on the 12-inch single release of "Lap of Luxury".

The CD editions of the album carry all 15 tracks. The 2005 enhanced CD also contains a QuickTime video for "Lap of Luxury".

A reissue box set, "The Unwrapped Edition", was released in May 2026, featuring full remixes of the album by Bruce Soord, including a mix with newly replaced drum samples as well as a mix with the original drum sounds. Also included in the set is a remix of Ian Anderson's 1983 solo album, Walk Into Light and portions of the previously released Live at Hammersmith '84 live album.

== Live performances ==
For the 1984 tour to promote Under Wraps, Jethro Tull offered artistic stage production as usual. In a manner quite similar to the Thick as a Brick tour, the roadies appeared onstage sweeping the floor, counting the audience and studying the place. All band members and instruments were covered in "wraps", with Anderson then releasing them and the music starting. During the tour, due to the more ambitious nature of the vocals, Anderson had strained his throat in the process of performing the album's vocally demanding songs.

== Track listing ==
=== Original vinyl ===
All tracks are written by Ian Anderson and Peter-John Vettese except where indicated.

Side one
No.	Title	Writer(s)	Length
1.	"Lap of Luxury"	Anderson	3:35
2.	"Under Wraps #1"	Anderson	3:59
3.	"European Legacy"	Anderson	3:23
4.	"Later, That Same Evening"		3:51
5.	"Saboteur"		3:31
6.	"Radio Free Moscow"		3:40

Side two
No.	Title	Writer(s)	Length
1.	"Nobody's Car"	Anderson, Martin Barre, Vettese	4:08
2.	"Heat"		5:37
3.	"Under Wraps #2"	Anderson	2:14
4.	"Paparazzi"	Anderson, Barre, Vettese	3:47
5.	"Apogee"		5:28

=== CD ===
No.	Title	Writer(s)	Length
1.	"Lap of Luxury"	Anderson	3:35
2.	"Under Wraps #1"	Anderson	3:59
3.	"European Legacy"	Anderson	3:23
4.	"Later, That Same Evening"		3:51
5.	"Saboteur"		3:31
6.	"Radio Free Moscow"		3:40
7.	"Astronomy"		3:38
8.	"Tundra"		3:41
9.	"Nobody's Car"	Anderson, Barre, Vettese	4:08
10.	"Heat"		5:37
11.	"Under Wraps #2"	Anderson	2:14
12.	"Paparazzi"	Anderson, Barre, Vettese	3:47
13.	"Apogee"		5:28
14.	"Automotive Engineering"		4:05
15.	"General Crossing"		4:02

== Personnel ==
- Ian Anderson – vocals, flute, acoustic guitar, drum programming, Fairlight CMI
- Martin Barre – electric guitar
- Dave Pegg – bass guitar, double bass
- Peter-John Vettese – keyboards, electronic programming

Additional personnel

- Trevor Key – cover photo, photography
- John Pasche – artwork, cover design
- Sheila Rock – photography

== Charts ==
Chart (1984)	Peak position
Australian Albums (Kent Music Report)	45
German Albums (Offizielle Top 100)	15
Swedish Albums (Sverigetopplistan)	43
Swiss Albums (Schweizer Hitparade)	9
UK Albums (Official Charts)	18
US Billboard 200	76

Chart (2026)	Peak position
Austrian Albums (Ö3 Austria)	28
Belgian Albums (Ultratop Flanders)	117
Croatian International Albums (HDU) The Unwrapped Edition	14
Croatian International Albums (HDU)	17
German Albums (Offizielle Top 100)	11
German Pop Albums (Offizielle Top 100)	6
Hungarian Physical Albums (MAHASZ)	11
