= Bungle in the Jungle =

Single by Jethro Tull

from the album War Child
- B-side: "Back-Door Angels"
- Released: 14 October 1974
- Recorded: 1974
- Studio: Morgan Studios, London
- Genre: Progressive rock
- Length: 3:35
- Label: Chrysalis
- Songwriter: Ian Anderson
- Producer: Ian Anderson

Jethro Tull singles chronology
| "A Passion Play (Edit #8)" (1973) | "Bungle in the Jungle" (1974) | "Skating Away on the Thin Ice of the New Day" (1975) |

"Bungle in the Jungle" is a song by British progressive rock band Jethro Tull. It was released on their album War Child in 1974.

A remnant from the band's abandoned "Chateau D'Isaster Tapes", "Bungle in the Jungle" features lyrics based on analogies between animals and humans. The song was later released as a single, becoming a top 20 hit in the United States and reaching the top 5 in Canada.

Despite the song's North American success, Anderson saw the song as too commercial and a minor song in the band's catalogue outside of North America.

== Background ==
Following the success of the band's 1972 album Thick as a Brick, Jethro Tull spent time in Paris to record the unfinished "Chateau D'isaster Tapes". According to Jethro Tull bandleader Ian Anderson, the unfinished album was intended to focus on "exploring people, the human condition, through analogies with the animal kingdom." Though a finished version was never released, some of the songs originally intended for the project appeared on the albums A Passion Play and War Child; Anderson later said, "That particular song was perhaps the more obvious and the more catchy of the tunes [from the sessions]."

Unlike other songs in the band's catalogue, "Bungle in the Jungle" features a more traditional, rock-oriented arrangement and structure. Anderson would later comment on this discrepancy in style:

It's a rather odd song for Jethro Tull, I think. Every so often there are those songs that fall into the conventional pop rock structure—songs like "Teacher", for instance—but that style isn't our forte. We're not very good at it because I'm not that kind of a singer, and it doesn't come easy to me to do that stuff. But "Bungle" is one of those songs that was nice to have done. It's got the Jethro Tull ingredients, but it's a little more straight-ahead. It's Jethro Tull in tight leather trousers.

When asked whether the song title was based on the legendary "Rumble in the Jungle" boxing match, Anderson responded, "'Bungle in the Jungle' had been released in the year 1974 on the War Child album, "rumble in the jungle" may have been taken from that. Because that took place on the 30th of October in 1974. Maybe they were alluding to what was a well-played song, even on AM radio. ... it certainly did [come first] in terms of writing it. As to the actual time of release, I can't be 100 percent sure on that. But chances are it was somewhere prior to that."

== Release ==
"Bungle in the Jungle", according to Anderson, was "finished and saved in time for the War Child album". In addition to being released on War Child in 1974, "Bungle in the Jungle" was released as a single, backed with "Back-Door Angels". The single was one of Jethro Tull's most successful US single releases ever, reaching number 12 on the Billboard charts. The single spent 16 weeks on the American charts was the band's second and final top 40 hit in the United States, after 1969's "Living in the Past". "Bungle in the Jungle" also reached number four in Canada. It was the 51st biggest Canadian hit of 1975.

Cash Box said that "Ian Anderson's vocal is powerful and his flute playing enhances the arrangement as always" and "the lyric is in the haunting metaphorical imagist mood that Tull has always typified so well."

Despite the song's North American commercial success, Anderson has since said of the song, "I feel self-conscious about it because I wrote it for radio play; it just feels a little too deliberate." He also noted the song's relative lack of success outside of America, saying "[the song] doesn't mean much anywhere else."

== Chart performance ==
=== Weekly charts ===
| Chart (1974–1975) | Peak position |
|---|---|
| Australia (KMR) | 32 |
| Canada RPM Top Singles | 4 |
| U.S. Billboard Hot 100 | 12 |
| U.S. Cash Box Top 100 | 12 |

=== Year-end charts ===
| Chart (1975) | Rank |
|---|---|
| Canada | 51 |
| U.S. Billboard Hot 100 | 89 |
| U.S. (Joel Whitburn's Pop Annual) | 121 |

== Personnel ==
Jethro Tull

- Ian Anderson – flute, acoustic guitar, vocals
- Martin Barre – electric guitar, Spanish guitar
- John Evan – piano, organ, synthesisers, accordion
- Jeffrey Hammond – bass guitar
- Barriemore Barlow – drums, percussion

Additional personnel

- David Palmer – orchestral arrangements
- Robin Black - Sound engineer
- Terry Ellis - Executive Producer
