= Kate Gilbert =

English painter (1843–1916)

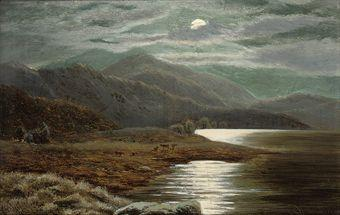
Kate Gilbert Ben Lomond by night, 1882

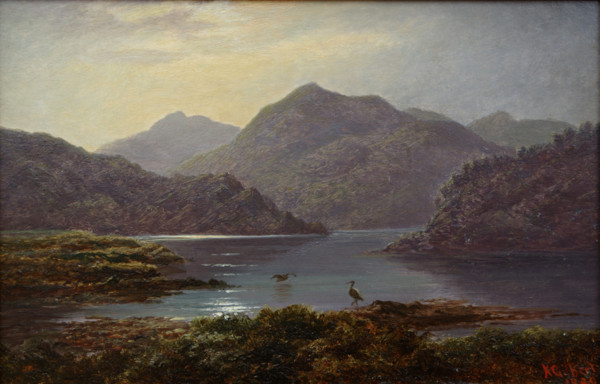
Kate Gilbert Night, Lynn Idwall, N. Wales, 1889

Kate Gilbert (1843-1916) was an English landscape painter during the Victorian era, and a member of the Williams family of painters.

Kate was born Kate Elizabeth Ellen Gilbert-Williams on 17 December 1843 in London, being the only child of the well-known Victorian landscape painter Arthur Gilbert and his first wife Elizabeth Williams. She became an artist like her father, and exhibited one painting in 1885 at the Suffolk Street Gallery of the Society of British Artists. Her younger step-brother Horace Walter Gilbert was an artist as well, but he ultimately chose a different career and became a civil servant instead.

Kate married in 1880 a widowed schoolmaster named Humphrey Hughes (1833-1885), who had three children from a previous marriage, but Kate never had children of her own. Her husband died five years into their marriage, after which she lived first with her father, and then after her father's death with her uncle the artist George Augustus Williams. Many of her works date from the late 1880s and the 1890s when she lived with these mentors, no doubt receiving encouragement from them both. She would have also shared the latter household with her cousin Caroline Fanny Williams, the daughter of her uncle, and an accomplished painter as well. When Kate's uncle died, she and Caroline parted company, and she ran a boarding house for a time, before retiring to Sutton, Surrey, where she died on 15 April 1916 at an address on Collingwood Road.
