= Charles Leslie (painter) =

English painter (1839–1886)

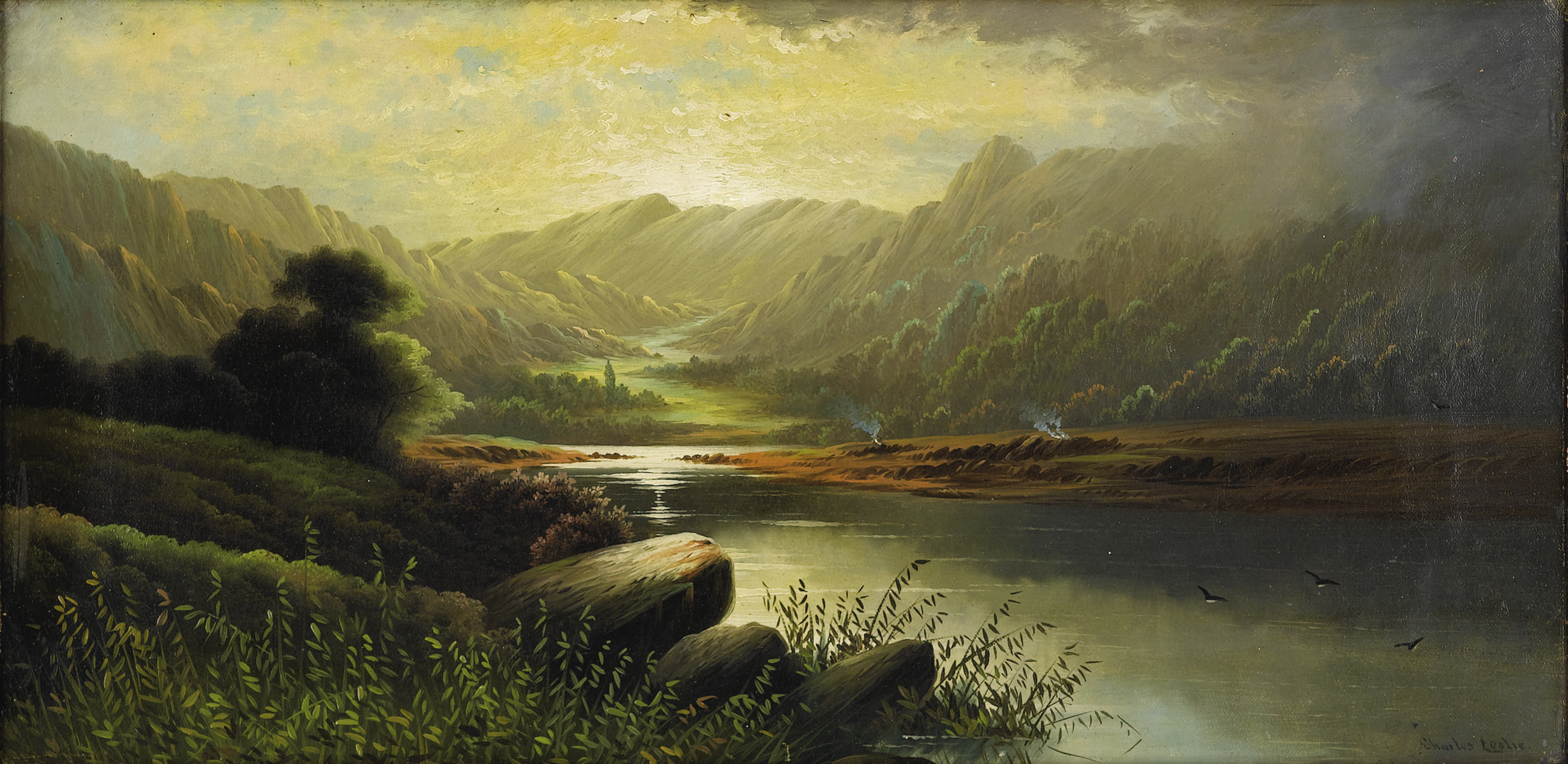
Charles Leslie Landscape

Charles Edward John Leslie (1839–1886) was an English landscape painter during the Victorian era, and a member of the Williams family of painters.

Leslie was born on 27 November 1839 in the Pentonville Road area of the Islington borough of London. He was the son of Emily Ann Williams and Charles Leslie, senior. His grandfather Edward Williams (1781–1855) was a well-known landscape painter, and the father of six sons, all artists, who collectively are referred to as the Williams family of painters. The younger Charles learned to paint from his uncles, especially George Augustus Williams, whom he lived with in 1856 and 1857 at 32 Castelnau Villas in Barnes at a time when Leslie was already exhibiting works at the Royal Academy.

Leslie is not to be confused with the much better-known painter Charles Robert Leslie, RA, the father of George Dunlop Leslie, RA. The lesser-known Charles Leslie was one of the first Victorian landscape artists to portray scenes of the Scottish and Welsh moorlands, and became one of the better-known painters of these themes. His landscapes often feature stark mountains in the background towering over still waters with open skies above.

Leslie exhibited at the Royal Academy (5 works), the British Institution (3 works), the Suffolk Street Gallery of the Society of British Artists (16 works), and exhibited in many lesser-known Victorian art venues as well. He died of liver disease at the age of 46 on 9 September 1886 at Mitcham Road Tooting near Wandsworth, Surrey. British museums with examples of his work include the National Library of Wales, the Royal Holloway Museum at the University of London and the Victoria Museum and Gallery in Liverpool. One of his landscapes is also on view at the Museum Geelvinck Hinlopen Huis in Amsterdam in the Netherlands.
