= Edward Williams (painter) =

English painter

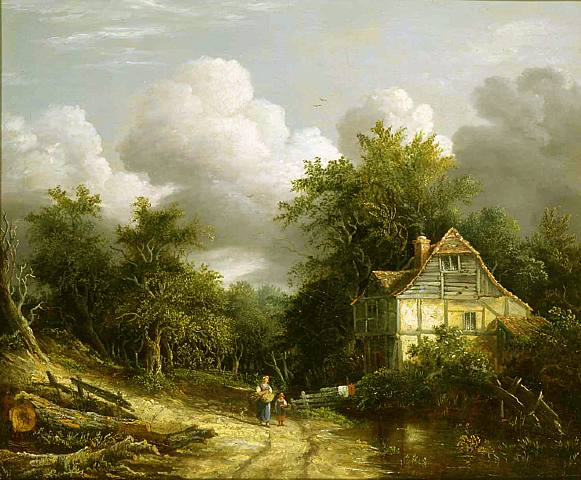
Edward Williams A Rustic Rural Landscape

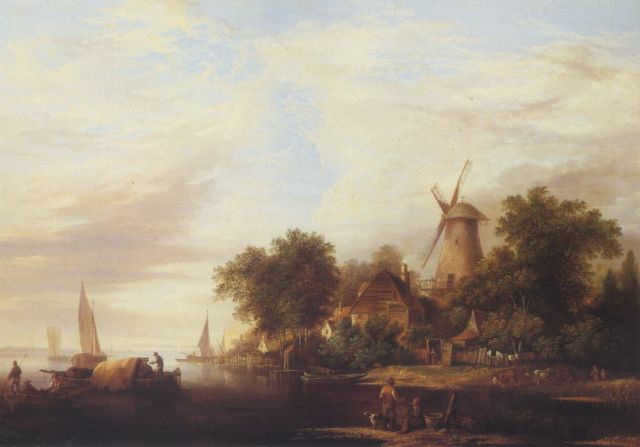
Edward Williams Cattle Watering by a Windmill

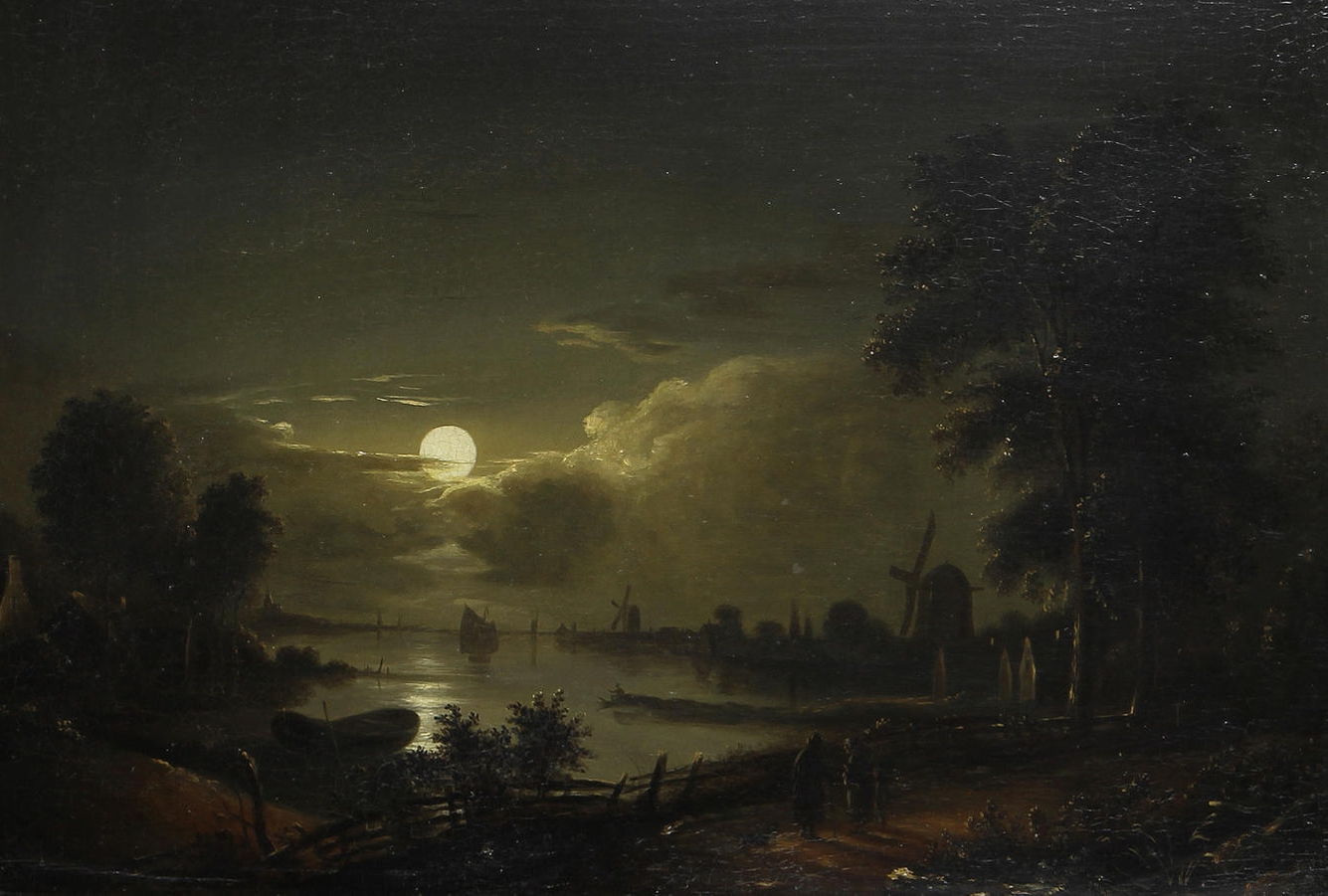
Edward Williams River by Moonlight

Edward Williams (1781 – 24 June 1855) was an English landscape painter during the Victorian era. He had six sons, who were well-known landscape painters as well. Williams is considered the patriarch of the Williams family of painters, which is also referred to as the Barnes School.

== Biography ==
=== Life and career ===
Although 1782 is usually given for his birth date, Edward Williams was actually born in 1781 in London, and baptized 13 October 1781 at St. Mary's Church in the Lambeth district. His mother Mary Ward was a sister of James Ward, the well-known animal painter, and a sister of the equally well-known engraver William Ward. She was also a sister-in-law of the brilliant figure painter George Morland, and a sister-in-law of Henry Chalon, another animal painter. His father, also named Edward Williams, was an engraver who worked with the master mezzotint engraver John Raphael Smith, and ran with a notorious group of drinkers that included the aforementioned George Morland, and Thomas Rowlandson the caricaturist. As such, the younger Williams grew up surrounded by artists, of whom Ward and Moreland were two the best-known painters in Georgian London.

Edward Williams, junior was sent around 1792 or 1793 to live with his maternal uncle James Ward, R.A. (1769–1859), but it seems unlikely that he received any painting instruction from him. Instead he was informally apprenticed to a carver and gilder named Thomas Hillier, who had a shop on Carnaby Street. Ultimately young Williams did become a painter, yet not a figure painter like his uncles, but a landscape painter, which, given his heritage is surprising as this was an age when landscape artists were considered inferior to figure painters. Although he never attained the fame of his uncles, he was nonetheless successful enough to enjoy a comfortable living. More important though, he fathered six sons, all artists like himself, who carried on the styles of landscape painting that he taught them, and some of whom were among the most popular landscape artists of the Victorian era.

Most of Edward Williams' life was spent in or near the artists quarter associated with Tottenham Court Road in London, until 1846 when he moved his family to 32 Castelnau Villas in rural Barnes, Surrey. There he, his wife, three of their children, and some of their grandchildren shared a large house, with a carriage house in back that became their studio. Three of his older sons eventually moved to nearby houses, some virtually next door, with only his oldest son Edward Charles Williams remaining in London. Here in Barnes, close to marshes of the Thames River, and near farm fields and wooded estates, the Williams family lived and worked in a communal artist setting. The hundreds of skillfully painted landscapes, all similar in subject and style, that flowed from their Barnes studios under the tutelage of Edward Williams gave rise to the popular attribution of the "Barnes School" of artists. However, they are most commonly referred to more simply as the "Williams family of painters".

Edward Williams between 1814 and 1855 exhibited at the Royal Academy (36 works), the British Institution (21 works), the Suffolk Street Gallery of the Society of British Artists (38 works), and elsewhere. He often shared venues with his sons, causing some confusion with the public who had trouble telling one Williams painting from another. He is often called "Old Williams" to distinguish him from his oldest son, and he is referred to in some of the art journals of the time as "Moonight Williams", as moonlit scenes of the Thames were one of his favorite subjects in his paintings. He was predeceased by his wife, and he is said to have never quite overcome the grief at her death. He died on 24 June 1855 at the Castelnau Villas, and is buried nearby in Barnes Cemetery.

=== Family ===
Edward Williams was the son of the engraver Edward Williams (c.1755-1797?) and Mary Ward. He married Ann Hildebrandt (c.1780-1851) on 12 February 1806 in St Pancras, London, Ann being the daughter of Frederick and Sarah Hildebrandt. They had the eight children who follow. Three of Edward and Ann Williams' sons eventually changed their last name so that the public would not confuse their paintings with those of the rest of the family.

1. Edward Charles Williams (10 July 1807 – 25 July 1881 Shepherd's Bush, London)
2. Henry John Boddington Williams (1811, St Marylebone, London - 11 April 1865 Barnes, London)
3. George Augustus Williams (4 May 1814, St Marylebone, London - 26 May 1901, Barnes, London)
4. Arthur Gilbert Frederick Williams (19 December 1819, Newington Butts Road, Stoke Newington, London - 21 April 1895, Croydon, Surrey)
5. Emily Ann Williams (7 June 1816 – 16 Dec 1857, Wimbledon, Surrey) - the mother of the landscape painter Charles Leslie
6. Sidney Richard Percy Williams (1821, London - 13 April 1886, Sutton, Surrey)
7. Alfred Walter Williams (18 July 1824, London - 16 December 1905, Croydon, Surrey)
8. Charles Williams (18 July 1824 - died shortly after birth)

== Art ==
=== Style and influence ===
Edward Williams probably began his art career making picture frames, but he was surrounded by relatives who were well-known painters and engravers, and over the years he reinvented himself as a painter. He started by painting miniatures, and copying Baroque landscapes from the 1600s in the style of the Dutch painters Ruisdael (1628-1682) and Hobbema (1638-1709) - the former known for woodland scenes with detailed renderings of trees, particularly the leaves, and water scenes with small boats moored beneath windmills; the latter known for his densely foliated trees with stippled leaves.

As Edward Williams developed his own style, he moved on to contemporary landscapes of the English countryside that, not surprisingly, hint of some of the work of his uncle George Morland. However, he became best known for moonlit scenes of boats and windmills along the Thames River, which earned him the epithet with the public of "Moonlight Williams", or simply the "moonlight painter". He rarely signed his work, perhaps but one painting in a hundred, and when he did he signed simply as E.Wms. As a consequence, the work of Old Williams can be difficult at times to distinguish from that of his son Edward Charles Williams, who painted in a similar style and signed his paintings E. Williams.

The Athenaeum on 14 July 1855 ran an obituary for Edward Williams in which they wrote, "The name of Mr. E. Williams, the Elder, must be added to the year's obituary. This agreeable landscape painter died, we perceive, in the seventy-fourth year of his age . . . [He] trained what must almost be called a school of landscape painters in his sons . . . whose works . . . do credit to him who trained them. His best landscapes (and none from his had were bad) may now rise in value among the collectors." Edward Williams was a master at painting detailed country landscapes in which the figures, if present at all, were generally subordinate to the scenery, but he is perhaps best remembered for passing that style on to six sons, some of whom were among the most popular landscape painters of their time.

=== Paintings ===
Some examples of Edward Williams' work showing the evolution of his painting style.

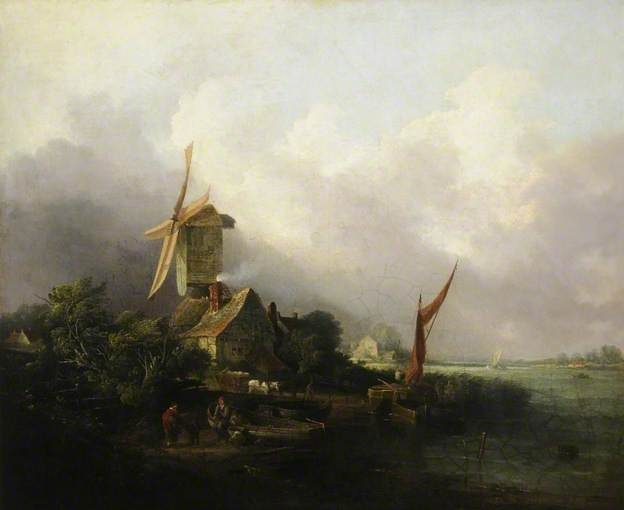
Edward Williams
A Squally Day on the Yare, Norfolk
(in the style of Ruisdael)

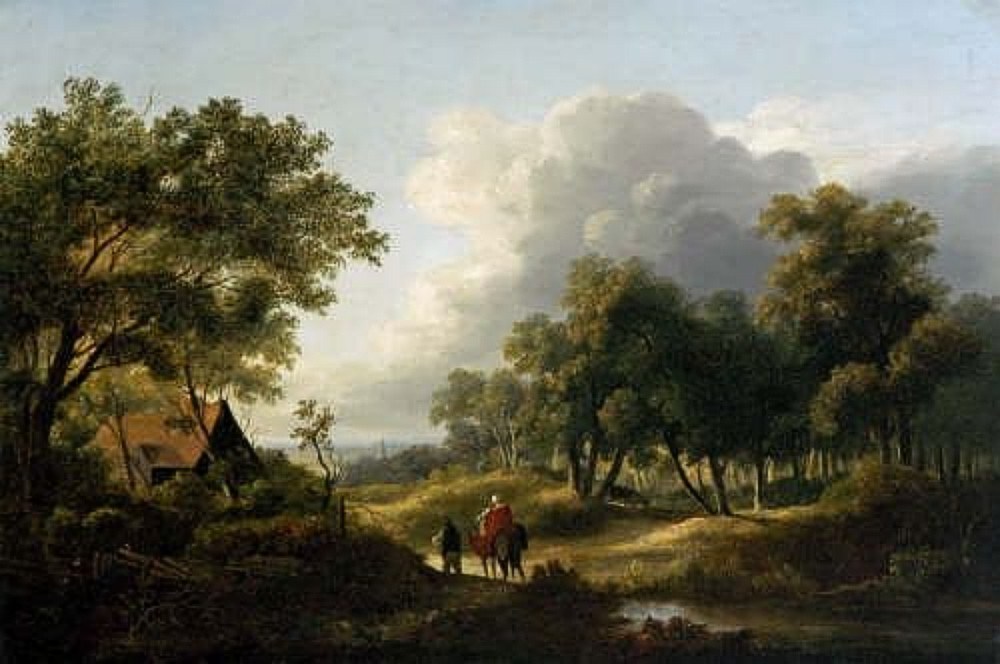
Edward Williams
Returning Home
(in the style of Hobbema)

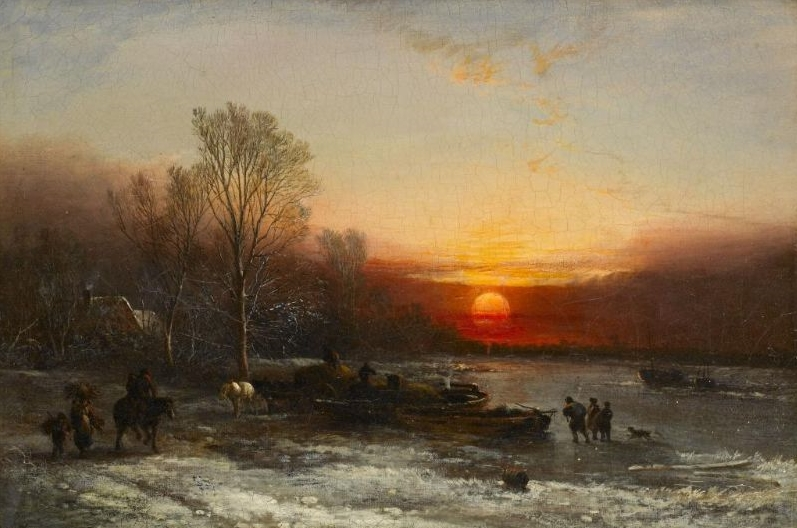
Edward Williams
Winter Evening
(typical of his moonlit landscapes)

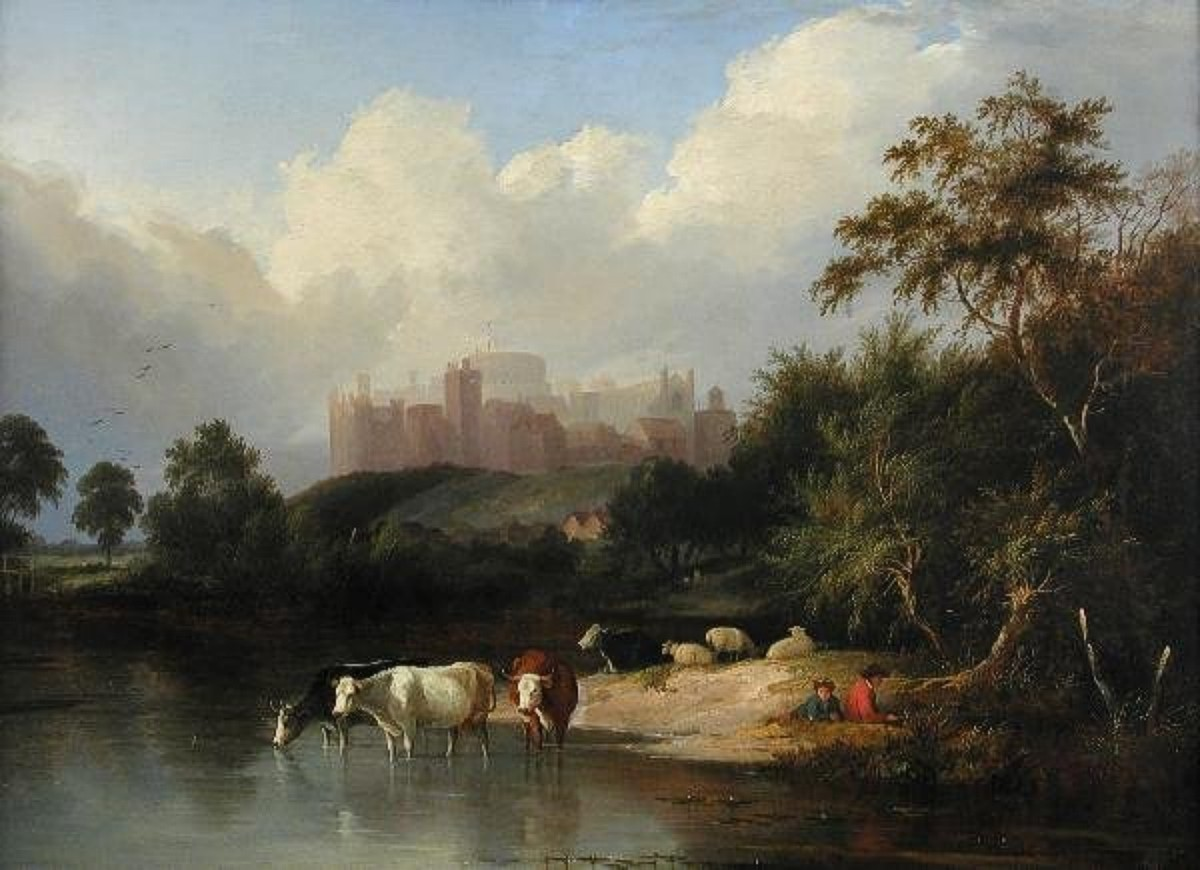
Edward Williams
River Landscape with Windsor Castle
(in the style of his son S R Percy)

=== Museums ===
- Anglesey Abbey, Lode near Cambridge, England
- Leeds Art Gallery, Leeds, England
- Castle Museum and Art Gallery, Nottingham, England (2 paintings)
- Tate Gallery, London, England (2 paintings)
- Temple Newsam House, Leeds, England
- Victoria and Albert Museum, London, England
- York Art Gallery, York, England
