= William Shayer =

English painter (1787–1879)

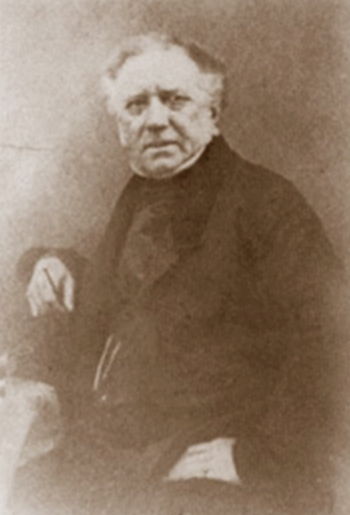
Photograph of William Shayer

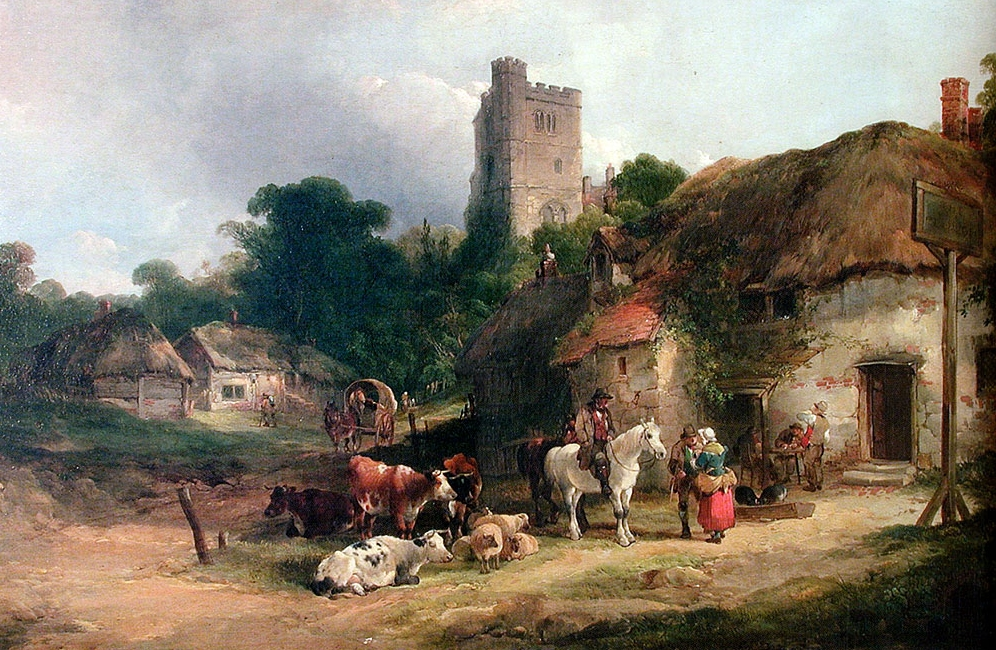
William Shayer The Plough Inn

William Shayer (1787–1879) was an English landscape painter and figure painter who became prominent during the Victorian era.

== Life and career ==
William Joseph Shayer, senior was born on June 1787, in Southampton. He was a self-taught artist, who began by painting decorations on rush-bottom chairs. He then moved on to painting carriages in the town of Guildford, after which he started doing heraldic painting. Ultimately, he began painting oil on canvas and became skilled at portraying woodland scenes with people (including Roma) and animals in front of country inns and farm houses, and beach scenes crowded with boats and fishermen.

He lived mainly in the south of England, in Shirley, Southampton, but painted throughout Hampshire and in a wooded district in the southwest part of Hampshire called the New Forest. Michael Hoy, a wealthy Southampton merchant, was one of his most enthusiastic patrons and bought many of Shayer's paintings of the area.

He sometimes collaborated with other artists. Particularly successful were his collaborations with Edward Charles Williams, where Williams would paint the landscape and Shayer would add in people and animals. He also collaborated with other members of Williams' family, Shayer's second wife Elizabeth Waller said to somehow be related to Williams. The Old Roadside Inn that is shown here is one example of a collaboration between Shayer and Williams, and Near Wantage, Berkshire is another.

Shayer was a competent landscape artist, but he is best known as a figure painter. His work is reminiscent in some respects to the paintings of George Morland, another very popular figure painter. Shayer's work though has a depth and brightness to it missing from the paintings of many of his contemporaries, due to his skillful application of glaze (i.e., spreading a thin, oily, transparent layer of paint over a dry opaque paint). He exhibited at the Royal Academy (6 works), the British Institution (82 works), and at the Suffolk Street Gallery of the Society of British Artists (338 works). He also exhibited in many of the lesser-known Victorian art venues as well. His works are on display at many museums, including the Victoria and Albert Museum, the Tate Gallery, the Glasgow Art Gallery, and the New York Metropolitan Museum of Art.

Shayer lived a long life, during which he had two wives and ten children. His eldest son, William Joseph Shayer, junior (1811-1892), was also a painter, and painted in a style very similar to his father. Their paintings are easily confused, which is made all the more difficult by the fact that they probably collaborated on several paintings in the elder Shayer's later years. Three of Shayer senior's younger sons – Edward Dasherwood Shayer (1821-1864), Henry Thring Shayer (1825-1894) and Charles Walker Shayer (1826-1914) – became painters at well, and all assisted him at times in his studio. William Shayer, senior died at the age of 92 on 21 December 1879 at his home at Bladon Lodge near Southampton.

== Paintings ==
Some examples of William Shayer's work.

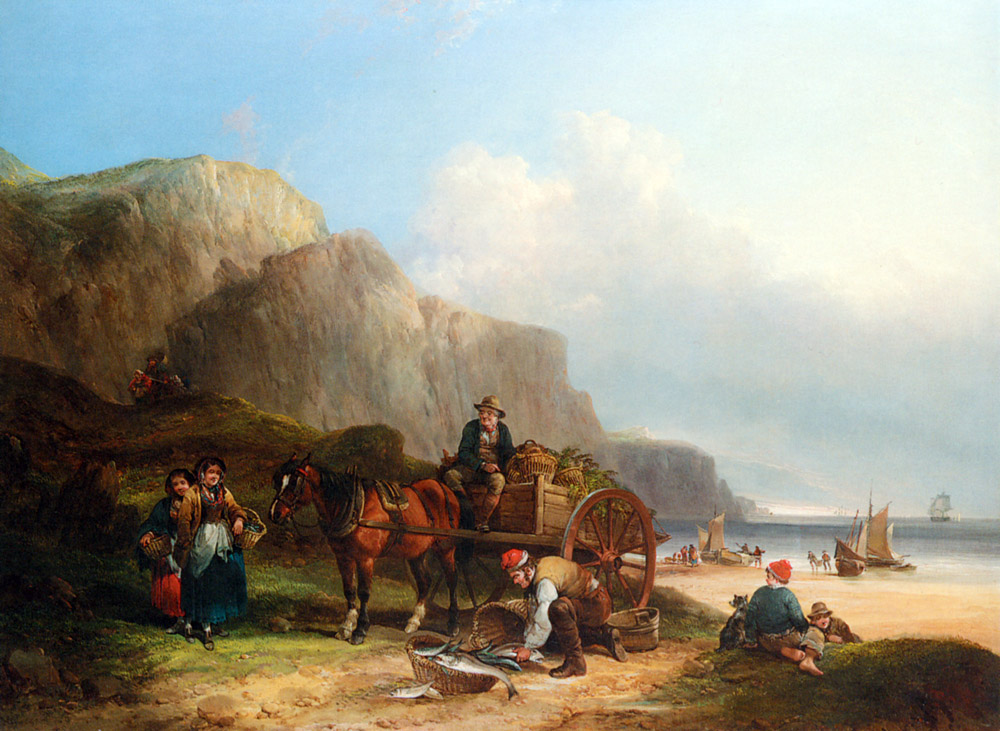
William Shayer
Scene in the Isle of Wight, 1823

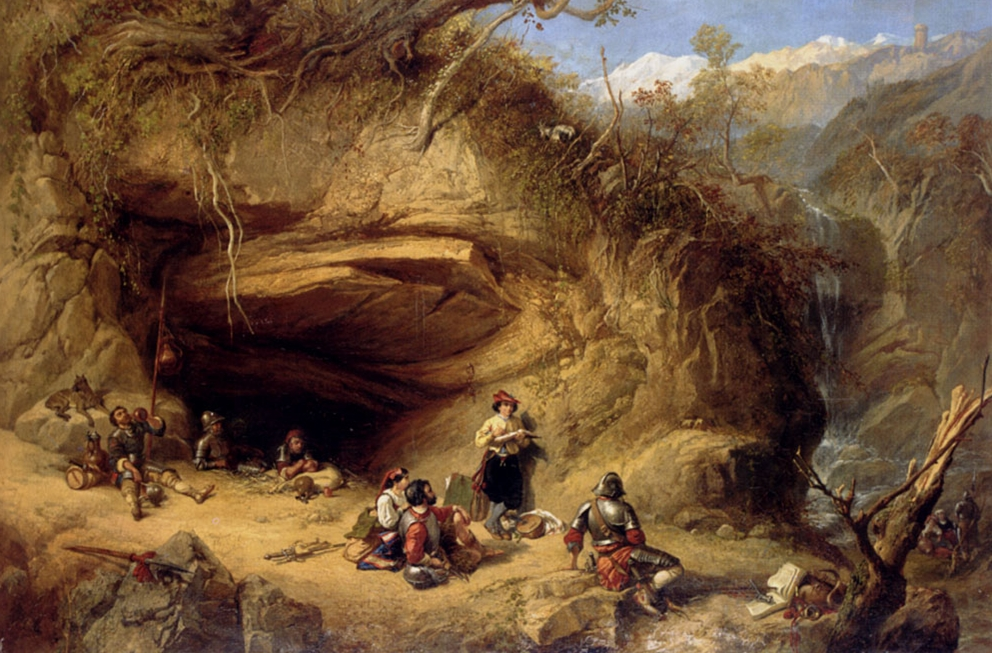
William Shayer
Scene Near Zeldkirch in the Tyrol

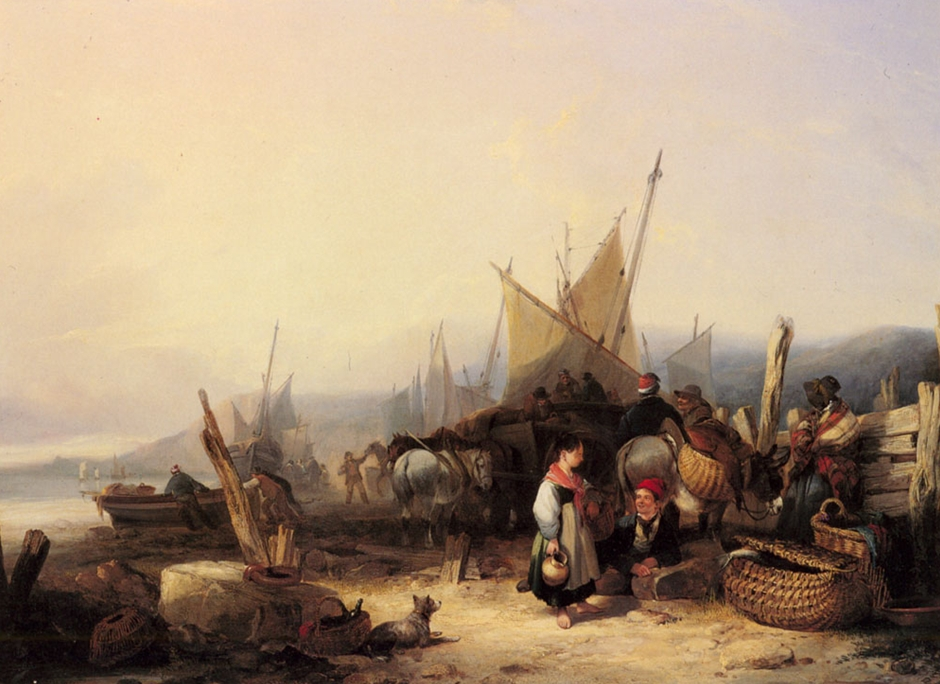
William Shayer
The Start of the Day
