= Amy Dora Reynolds =

British poet and author (1860–1957)

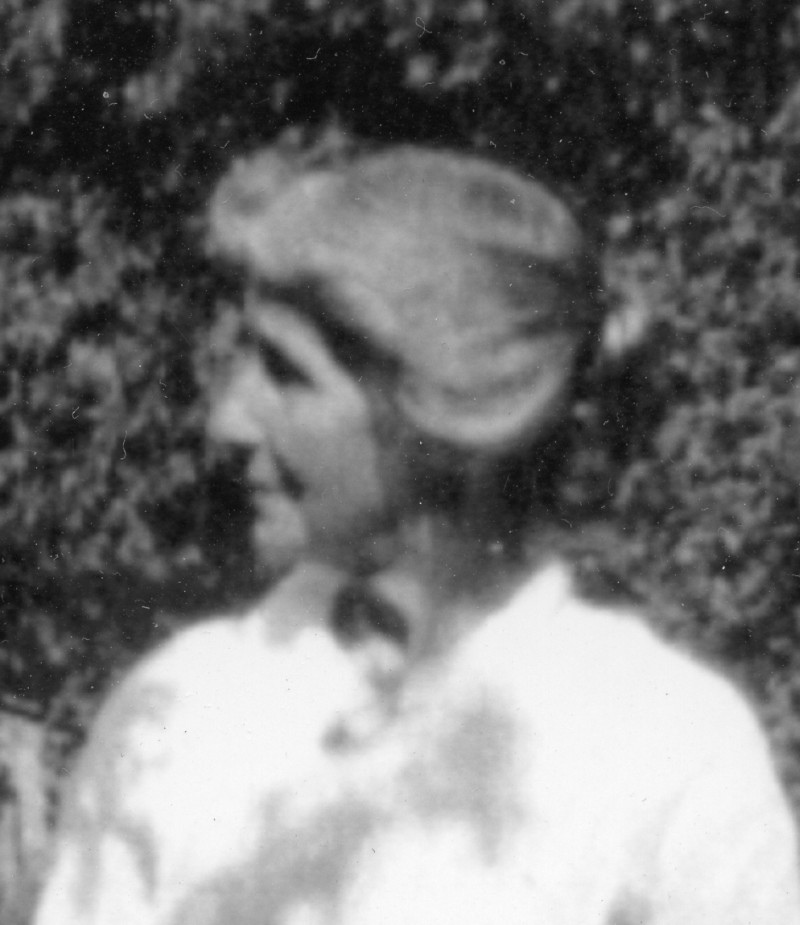
Reynolds in 1910

Amy Dora Reynolds (born Amy Dora Percy Williams; 6 October 1860 – 11 June 1957), who wrote under the pen name of Mrs. Fred Reynolds, was a British poet and author of crime and romance novels.

== Biography ==
Reynolds was born on 6 October 1860, at Florence Villa on Inner Park Road, in Wandsworth. Her father was painter Sidney Richard Percy, who was a member of the Williams family of painters. Amy initially followed in her father's footsteps as an artist, and exhibited under her maiden name of Amy Dora Percy one painting at the Royal Academy and three with the Society of British Artists. Her brother Herbert Sidney Percy was an artist as well.

Although she showed promise as an artist, she became a well-known writer instead of crime and romance novels under the pen name of Mrs. Fred Reynolds. Between 1889 and 1936 she published 41 books, including an Idyll of the Dawn (1898) and A Quaker Wooing (1905), both of which are autobiographical in part.

She married Richard Freshfield (Fred) Reynolds (1860–1907), a pharmaceutical chemist, on 15 September 1886 at St. Michael and All Angels Church in Bedford Park, Chiswick. They lived in Headingley, Yorkshire, and had three children, Richard Frederic Reynolds (1888–1918), Dora Eldrid Reynolds (1889–1958) and Kenneth Richard Reynolds (1892–1960). She was interned briefly with her daughter in Italy towards the end of World War II, and died on 11 June 1957, aged 96, at Grange-over-Sands, Cumbria, Lancashire.

== Publications ==
=== Novels ===
- Little Prince Frisco. A fairy story, illus. by the author. Leeds, McCorquodale & Co., 1889.
- Llanartro. A Welsh idyll, London, Gay & Bird, 1895.
- A Tangled Garden, London, Hutchinson & Co., 1896.
- An Idyll of the Dawn. London, J. Bowden, 1898.
- In the Years That Came After, London, Hutchinson & Co., 1899.
- The Hut on the Island: The story of a week's holiday, London & Edinburgh, Gall & Inglis, 1902.
- The Man with the Wooden Face, London, Hutchinson & Co., 1903; New York, Fox, 1903.
- The Book of Angelus Drayton, London, John Long, 1904.
- The Making of Michael, London, George Allen, 1905.
- A Quaker Wooing, London, Hutchinson & Co., 1905.
- Hazel of Hazeldean, London, Hurst & Blackett, 1906.
- In Silence, London, Hurst & Blackett, 1906.
- The House of Rest, London, Hurst & Blackett, 1907.
- These Three, London, Hodder & Stoughton, 1907.
- Love's Magic, London, Hurst & Blackett, 1908.
- St. David of the Dust, London, Hurst & Blackett, 1908.
- The Lady in Grey, London, Hurst & Blackett, 1909.
- The Forsythe Way, London, Chapman & Hall, 1910.
- The Idyll of an Idler: Being some adventures of a caravan in Cornwall, London, Everett & Co., 1910.
- As Flows the River, London, Chapman & Hall, 1911.
- The Horseshoe, London, Chapman & Hall, 1911.
- The Gifted Name, London, Hodder & Stoughton, 1912.
- The Grey Terrace, London, Chapman & Hall, 1912.
- Letters to a Prison, London, Chapman & Hall, 1912.
- The Granite Cross, London, Chapman & Hall, 1913.
- The Woman Flinches, London, Chapman & Hall, 1913.
- An Absent Hero, London, Mills & Boon, 1914.
- Long Furrows, London, Mills & Boon, 1915.
- Fetters on the Feet, London, Edward Arnold, 1917.
- The Man Who Could Not See, London, John Lane, 1922.
- Trefoil, London, John Lane, 1923.
- It Might Have Been Otherwise, London, John Lane, 1925.
- Miss Anne Tankerton, London, John Lane, 1926.
- Love's Echo, London, John Lane, 1927.
- Players in the Dark, London, John Lane, 1928.
- Anna Marplott, London, John Lane, 1929.
- Coin of Life, London, John Lane, 1929.
- The Loram Picture, London, John Lane, 1930.
- Ashes on the Hearth, London, John Lane, 1931.
- Green Stockings, London, John Lane, 1933.
- A Victorian Bacchante, London, John Lane, 1935.
- The Woman Drives, London, John Lane, 1936.

=== Verse ===
- Songs and Poems, Leeds, McCorquodale & Co., 1890.
