= Williams family of painters =

Family of prominent 19th-century Victorian landscape artists

The Williams family of painters, also known as the Barnes School, is a family of prominent 19th-century Victorian landscape artists known for their paintings of the British countryside, coasts and mountains. They are represented by the artist Edward Williams (1781–1855), his six sons, and several grandchildren.

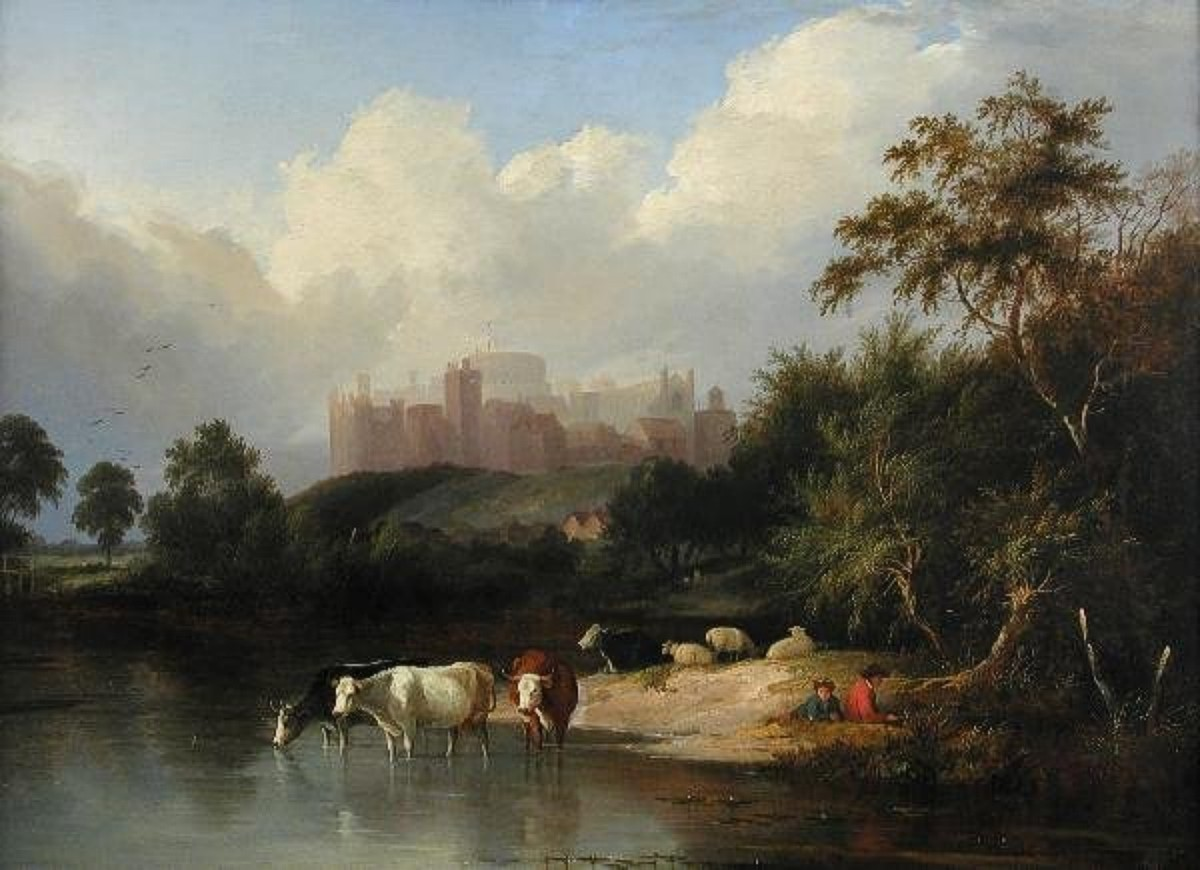
Edward Williams River Landscape with Windsor Castle

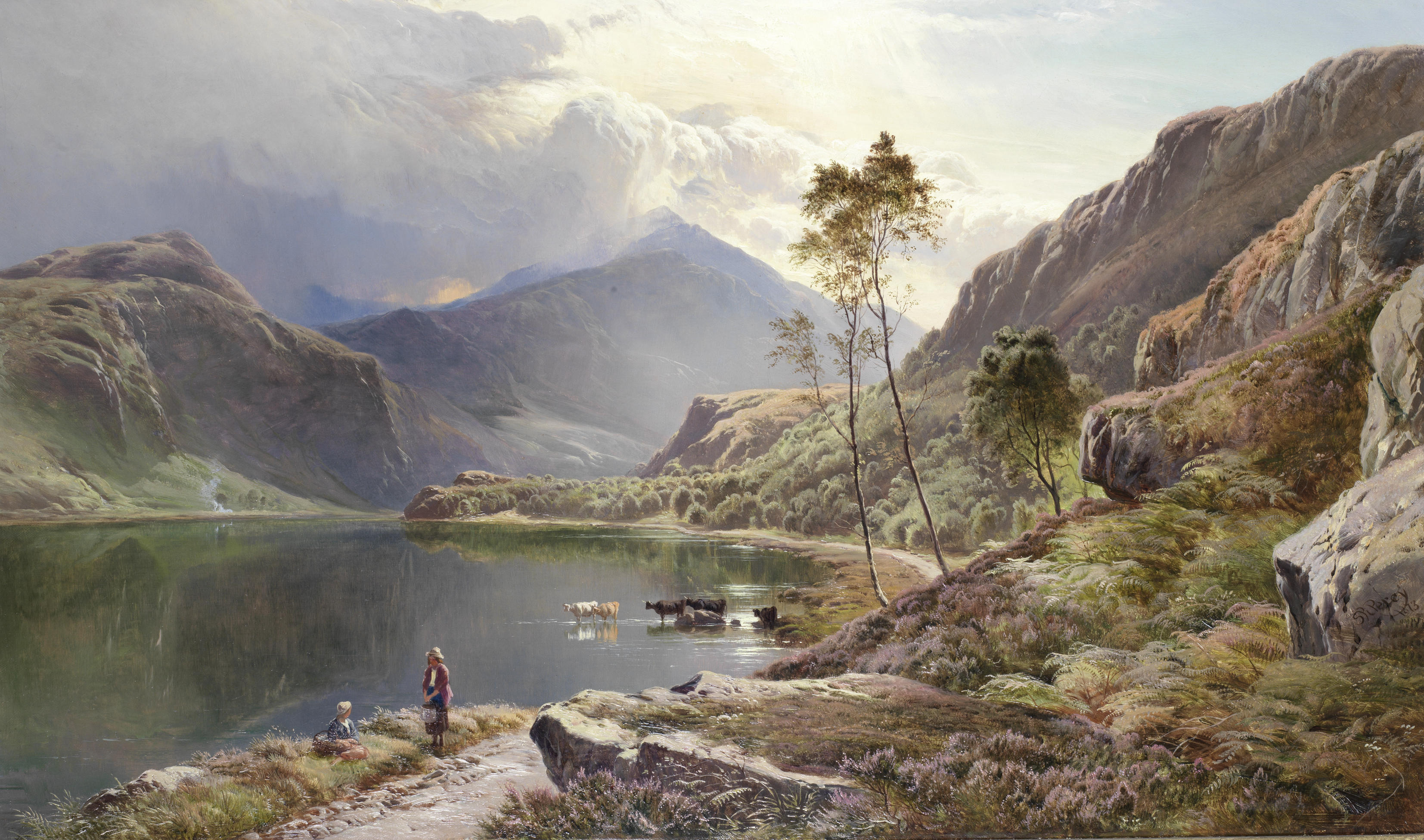
Sidney Richard Percy Llyn-y-Ddinas, North Wales, 1873

== Barnes School ==
=== Origins and style ===
Edward Williams (1781–1855), the patriarch of the Williams family of painters and founder of the Barnes School of artists, was a successful landscape artist, who became very popular during the Victorian era for painting moonlit scenes of the English countryside. He was followed as a landscape artist by his six sons and several of his many grandchildren. Over the years, this artist family became known as the Barnes School, so called because from 1846 until about the turn of the century, Williams, several of his sons, and some of his grandchildren worked out of neighboring studios in the then rural setting of Barnes, London, on the south side of the Thames River.

The Williams family was probably first referred to as a school by the Athenaeum magazine, whose July 14, 1855 obituary for Edward Williams wrote that, "[he] trained what must almost be called a school of landscape painters in his sons . . . whose works . . . do credit to him who trained them." This same journal in 1886, and subsequently the Dictionary of National Biography, wrote that Williams' son Sidney Richard Percy was "founder of the so-called School of Barnes". Nonetheless, the role of Edward Williams as patriarch and mentor of Percy and his brothers is undeniable. Percy specialized in painting landscape scenes with cattle, and if the description "Barnes School" implies just this style of landscape, then certainly it is Percy who developed that theme to a greater degree than any in his family. However, if the Barnes School implies a style employed by the family as a whole wherein the natural setting of the landscape, not the figures in it, sets the mood for the painting, then Percy's father Edward Williams must be considered the founder of the Barnes School.

Paintings of the Williams family are characterized by farm and village settings, cloudy mountain vistas, boats plying marshes along the Thames, and cattle grazing in meadow wetlands, usually painted in soft earth tones and subtle greens, and often displaying a complex interplay of light and shadow. Edward Williams was a master at creating scenes with complex lighting in which the figures, often people and boats, were subordinate to the scenery, in an age when landscape painters were considered subordinate to figure painters. His sons developed this style further, each adding their own variations. Their paintings were extremely popular in Victorian England and remain so today. Examples of the work of Edward Williams and all six of his sons, as well as several of his grandchildren hang today in prominent museums, and some Williams family paintings, especially those of Henry John Boddington and Sidney Richard Percy, command impressive prices at auction.

=== Family members ===
The best-known members of the Williams Family (Barnes School) are the six sons of Edward Williams, who is sometimes called Old Williams to avoid confusion with his oldest son. Unlike many popular Victorian artists, the Williams generally enjoyed a fair degree of success during their lifetimes. They exhibited prolifically with the Royal Academy, the British Institution, the Suffolk Street Gallery of the Society of British Artists, and many other Victorian art venues of the time. Old Williams' sons follow.

1. Edward Charles Williams (1807–1881)
2. Henry John Boddington (1811–1865)
3. George Augustus Williams (1814–1901)
4. Arthur Gilbert (1819–1895)
5. Sidney Richard Percy (1821–1886)
6. Alfred Walter Williams (1824–1905)

Edward Williams, Sr. also had a daughter Emily Ann Williams (1816–1857). Though she did not become a painter like her brothers, she was the mother of the landscape artist Charles Leslie, who is considered a member of the Williams family.

Sidney Richard Percy is the best known of Edward Williams' sons, and arguably was the most successful. His paintings are also the most sought after today. However, Henry John Boddington was well known in his lifetime as well, and he was even elected a member (RBA) of the prestigious Royal Society of British Artists, a recognition not achieved by any of his brothers.

Several of Old Williams' grandchildren became landscape painters and exhibited paintings with the Royal Academy, which was considered the most prestigious of the London exhibitions. They exhibited with the other major art venues as well, particularly at the Suffolk Street Gallery of the Society of British Artists. Shown below are those grandchildren whose names appear in the exhibition catalogs, and who, with the exception of Amy Dora Percy, are listed in Wood's (1995) Dictionary of Victorian Painters.

- Edwin Henry Boddington (1836–?) – son of Henry John Boddington
- Walter Williams (1834–1906) – son of George Augustus Williams
- Caroline Fanny Williams (1836–1921) – daughter of George Augustus Williams
- Charles Leslie (1839–1886) – son of Emily Williams (a daughter of Old Williams)
- Kate Gilbert (1843–1916) – daughter of Arthur Gilbert
- Horace Walter Gilbert (1855–1928) – son of Arthur Gilbert
- Amy Dora Percy (1860–1957) – daughter of Sidney Richard Percy
- Herbert Sidney Percy (1863–1932) – son of Sidney Richard Percy

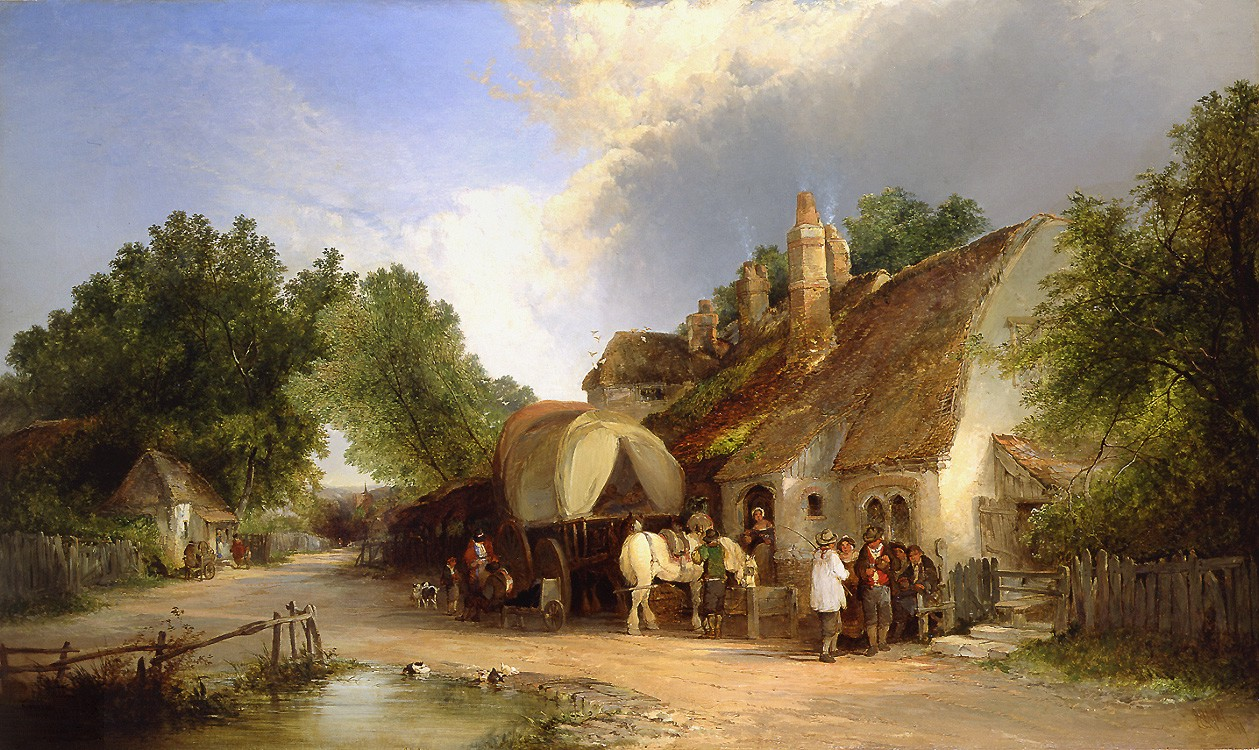
Edward Charles Williams & William Shayer, The Old Roadside Inn

Charles Leslie, Caroline Fanny Williams, and Herbert Sidney Percy are probably the best known of the grandchildren of Edward Williams, and their paintings show up regularly at auctions and in galleries. Edwin Henry Boddington had the most works exhibited at the Royal Academy, which indicates his talent, but his success and subsequent recognition was limited, some say by a lack of industry and perhaps a tendency to rest on the accomplishments of his father. All four of these grandchildren have works displayed in one or more British museums.

Though he is seldom identified with the Barnes School, the figure painter William Shayer (1787–1879) nonetheless collaborated on occasion with several of the Williams brothers, especially with Edward Charles Williams and sometimes with Edwin Henry Boddington and Sidney Richard Percy. Said to somehow be related to the family by marriage, Shayer would add figures, usually people or farm animals, to Williams landscapes otherwise barren of this ornamentation. Near Wantage, Berkshire is an oil on canvas that is one well-known example of such a collaboration between Shayer and Edward Charles Williams. The Old Roadside Inn shown here is another example of a Shayer and Williams collaboration. Shayer, a contemporary of Edward Williams senior, had four sons who followed him as a painter and are known collectively as the Shayer family of painters, a parallel to the Williams family.

Beginning with Edward Williams the engraver and his brothers-in-law James Ward, William Ward, George Morland and Henry Chalon, the Ward and Williams families represent five generations of engravers and painters (see the family tree below), as both Amy Dora Reynolds (née Percy) and Herbert Sidney Percy had children who followed careers in art. Although both of Walter William's children became painters also, little is known about them. However, none of these fifth-generation descendants were landscape painters in the tradition of the Barnes School. Richard Frederic Reynolds (1888–1918), the oldest son of Amy Dora Reynolds (née Percy) was a pupil of the genre painter Stanhope Forbes, R.A., but his career was cut short when he was killed in France during the First World War. His cousin, Sidney Dolores Percy (1892–1965), the only daughter of Herbert Sidney Percy, received a scholarship to the Royal Academy of Art and studied at St. John's Wood School of Art in London before moving to the United States, where she was a portrait painter in California under her married name of Sidney D. Bunce.

=== Family tree ===
Family tree for the Willams family of painters showing artists descended from Edward Williams the engraver.

Edward Williams the engraver c.1755–1797?	Mary Ward	William Ward; 1762–1826	Ann Ward married George Morland; 1763–1804	James Ward; 1769–1859	Sarah Ward married Henry Bernard Chalon; 1770–1849
Edward Williams "Old Williams"; 1781–1855	Ann Hildebrandt
Edward Charles Williams; 1807–1881	Henry John Boddington; 1811–1865	George Augustus Williams; 1814–1901	Arthur Gilbert; 1819–1895	Emily Ann Williams; 1816–1857	Sidney Richard Percy; 1821–1886	Alfred Walter Williams; 1824–1905
Edwin Henry Boddington b. 1836	Charles Leslie; 1839–1886
Walter Williams; 1834–1906	Caroline Fanny Williams; 1836–1921	Kate Gilbert; 1843–1916	Horace Walter Gilbert; 1855–1928	Amy Dora Percy (Mrs. Fred Reynolds); 1860–1957	Herbert Sidney Percy; 1863–1932
Florence Ada Williams; 1859–1927	Cyril Stanley Williams b. 1863	Richard Frederic Reynolds; 1888–1918	Sidney Dolores Bunce (née Percy); 1892–1965

== Art ==
=== Influence of art ===
The Victorian era (1837–1901) was a time when many Britons raised in the country became wealthy during the industrial revolution and were forced to leave their rural roots and relocate to the City of London. Nostalgic for the beauty and solitude of woodlands and meadows they once knew, with wealth enough to indulge in luxuries such as the arts, many spent large sums of money on country landscapes that reminded them of their childhoods. Painters able to capture on canvas the beauty of rural settings became immensely popular. Although royal recognition and membership in prestigious societies generally went to those artists who painted grand battle scenes and portraits, the public bought landscapes.

The popularity of Victorian landscapes declined in the 1880s with the emergence of Impressionism as an art style, and mirrored a decline in the fortunes of the Williams brothers. "Williams [family] paintings were designed ... to be displayed in homes, rather than museums or galleries, and these gentle landscapes fell into obscurity as tastes changed." Ultimately the only member of the Barnes School to receive formal recognition was Henry Boddington with his 1842 election to the Society of British Artists (RBA). It would appear that none of the Williams family were ever considered for membership in the Royal Academy (RA), the most prestigious recognition of them all. In fact, of the most popular landscape artists of the Victorian era only Benjamin Williams Leader (1831–1923) was elected an academian to the Royal Academy. Ironically, Leader had been born Williams, but changed his surname to avoid being confused as a son of Edward Williams, to whom he was unrelated.

Despite little critical acclaim during their lifetimes, Sidney Richard Percy, Henry Boddington and Arthur Gilbert were three of the most popular landscape artists of the Victorian era, probably more so than the aforementioned Benjamin Leader. Furthermore, the output from their family was immense, with over 800 paintings exhibited with the Society of British Artists alone. This, plus the enduring popularity of their works today, reflected by the high prices some Williams family paintings bring in auction, demonstrates the importance of the Barnes School in the history of Victorian art.

=== Paintings ===
Examples of paintings by some of the better-known members of the family.

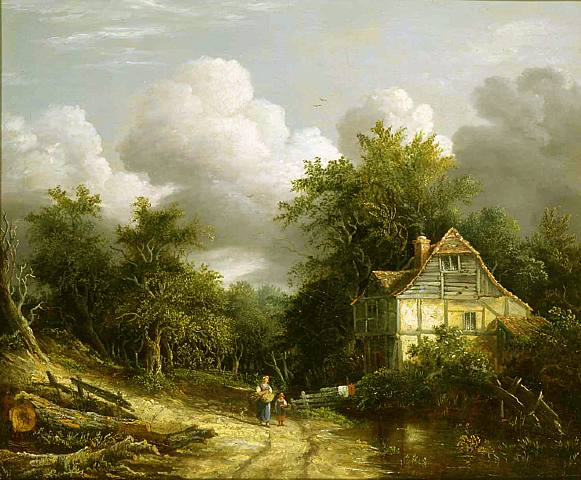
Edward Williams
A Rustic Rural Landscape

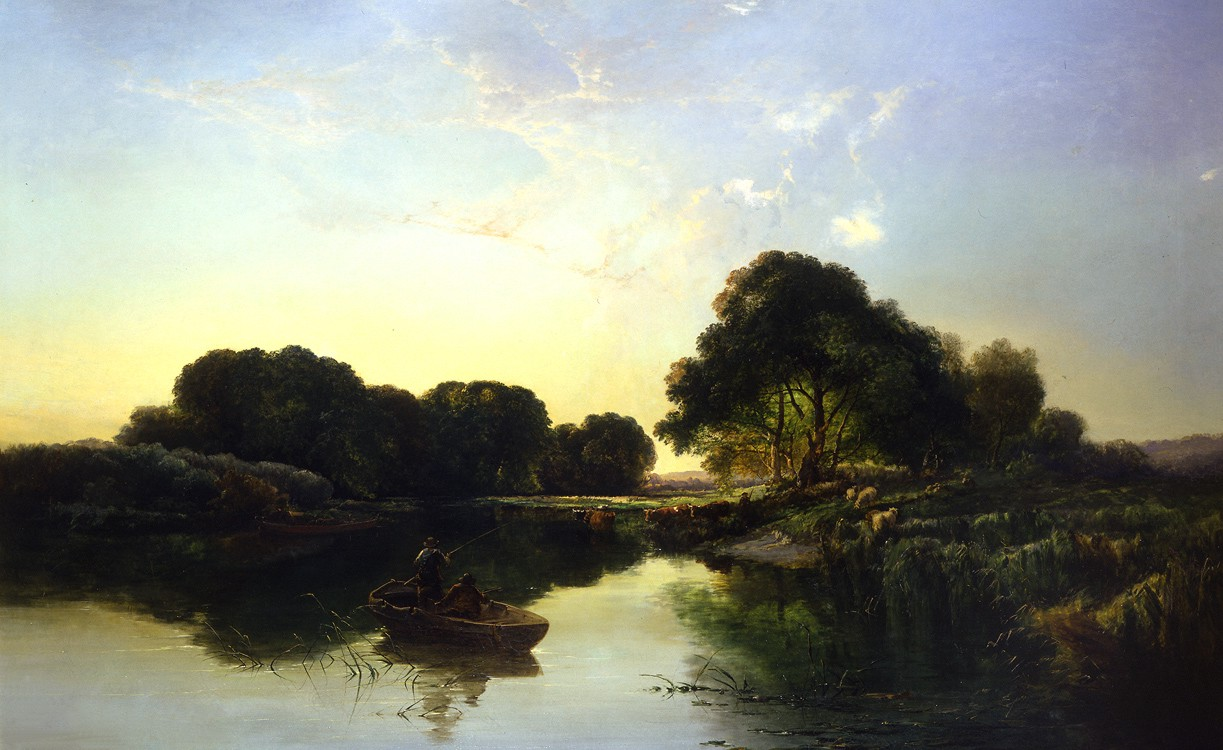
Edward Charles Williams
Out Fishing, 1855

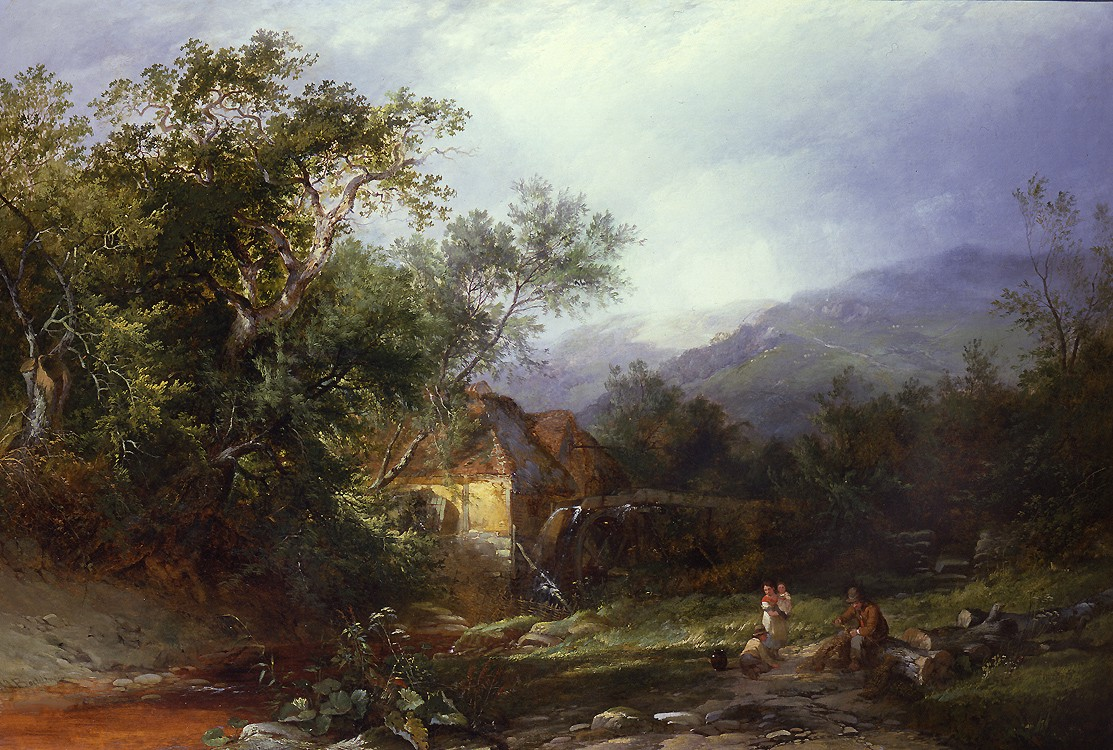
Henry John Boddington
Devonshire

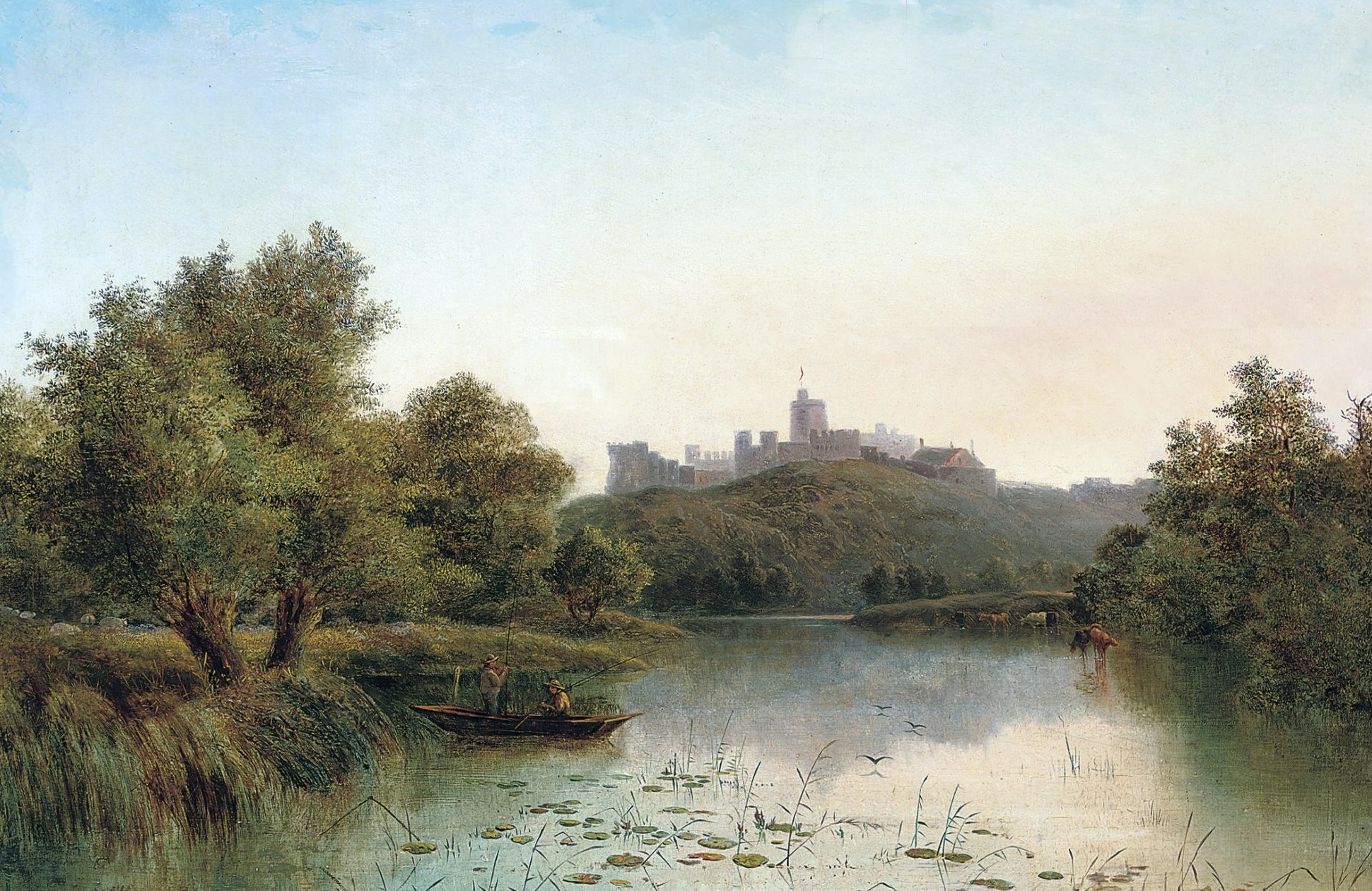
George Augustus Williams
Windsor Castle from the Thames

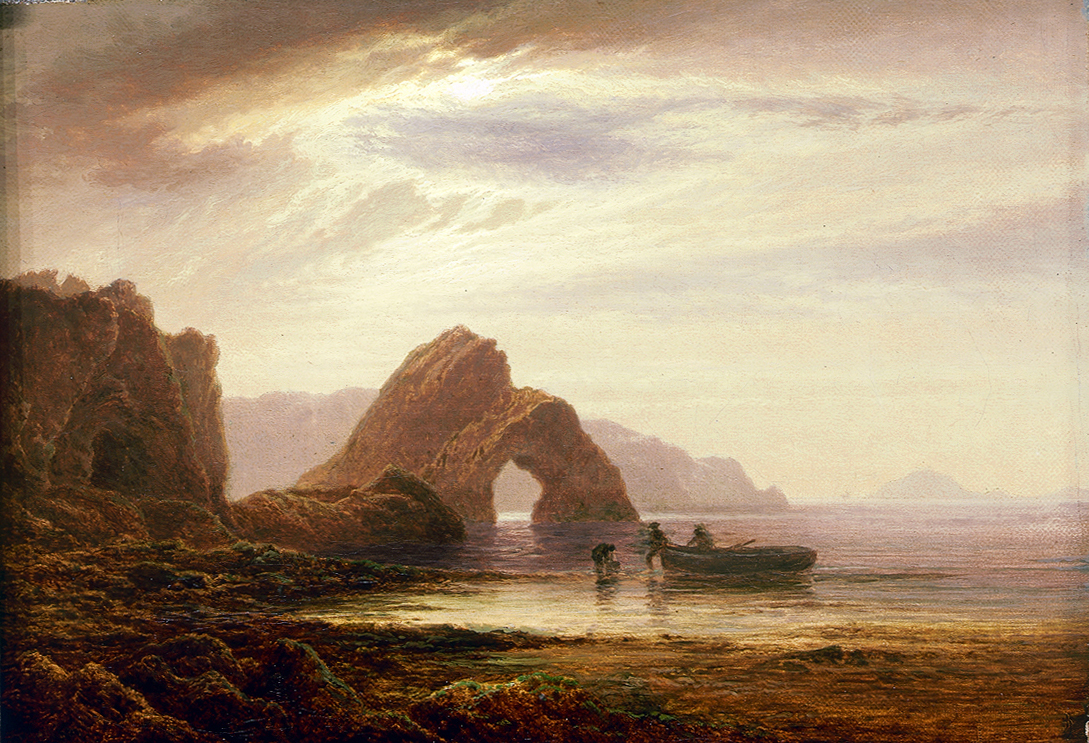
Arthur Gilbert
Gilter's Point, Tenby, by Moonlight, c.1873

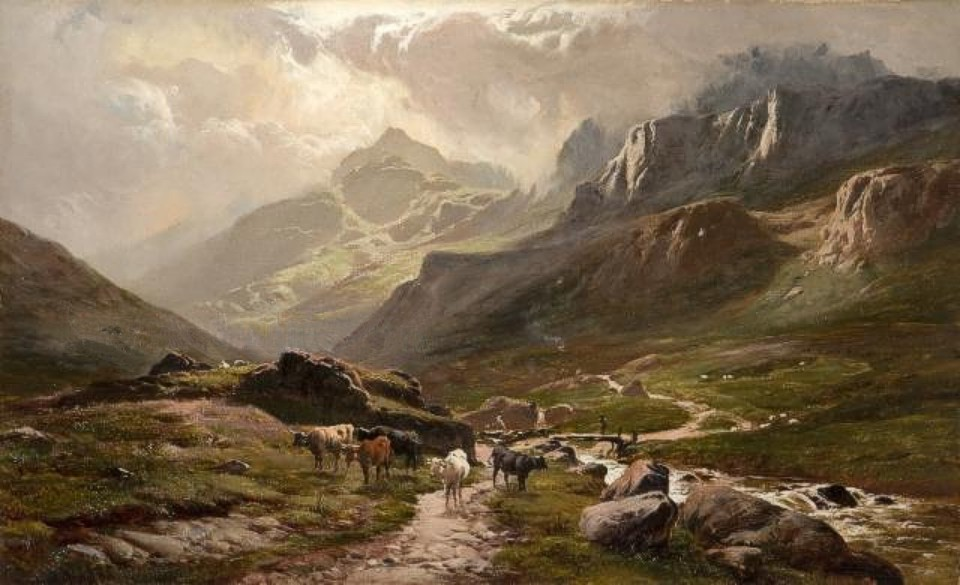
Sidney Richard Percy
Grizedale, Westmorland, 1883

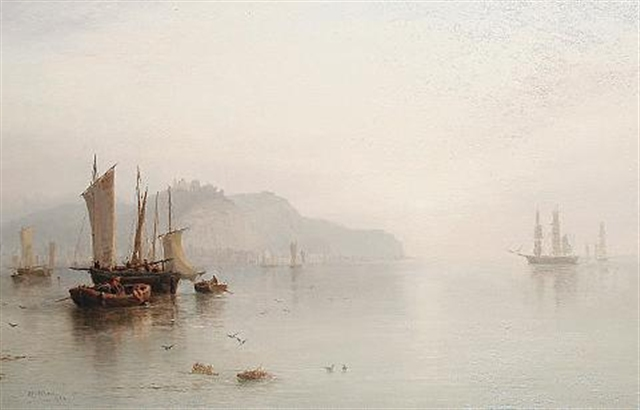
Alfred Walter Williams
Off Hastings, sunrise, 1885

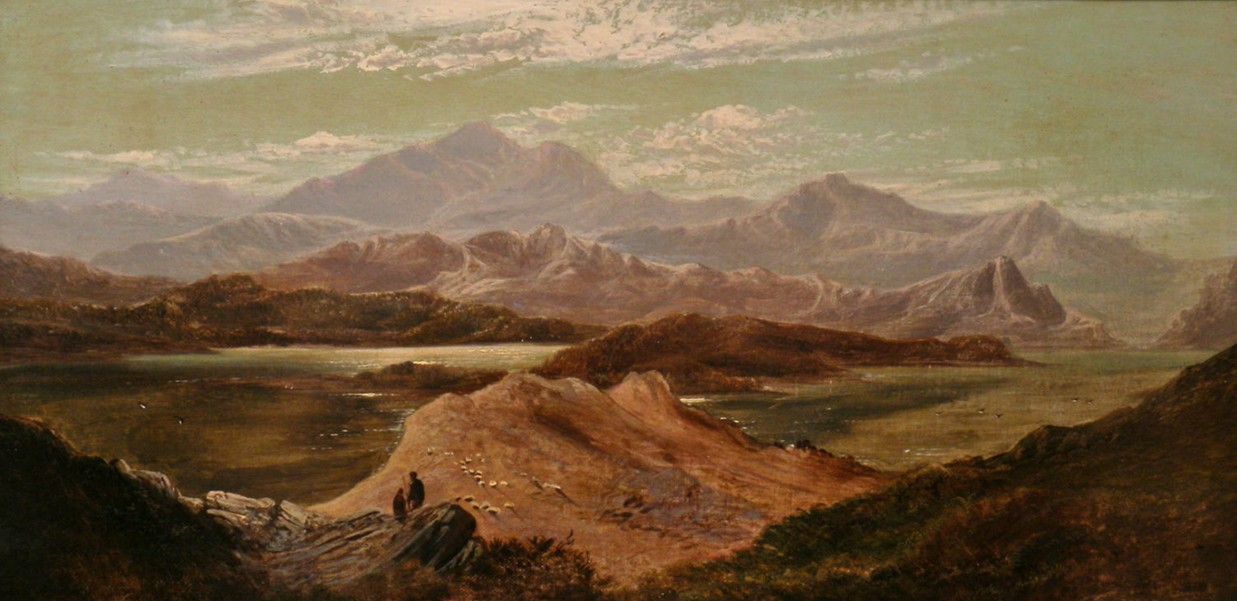
Charles Leslie
Mole Hebog, 1885

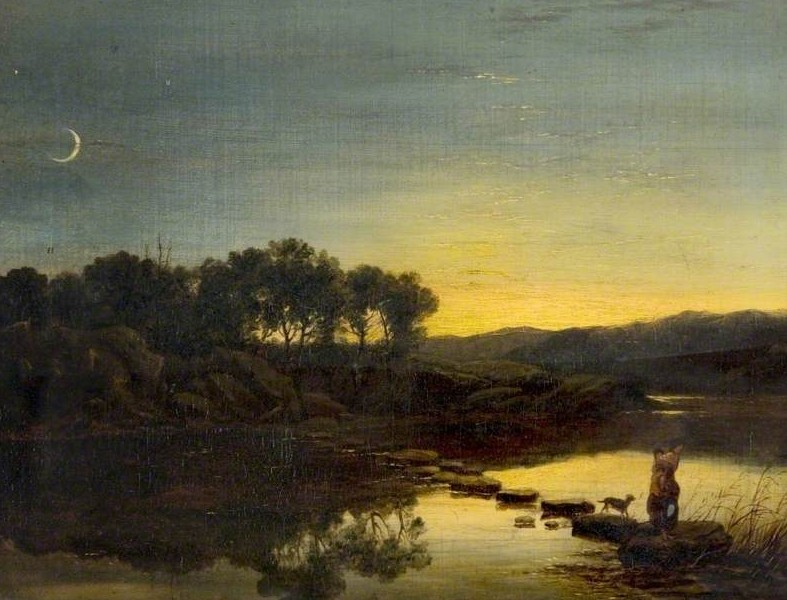
Edwin Henry Boddington
Landscape, Sunset

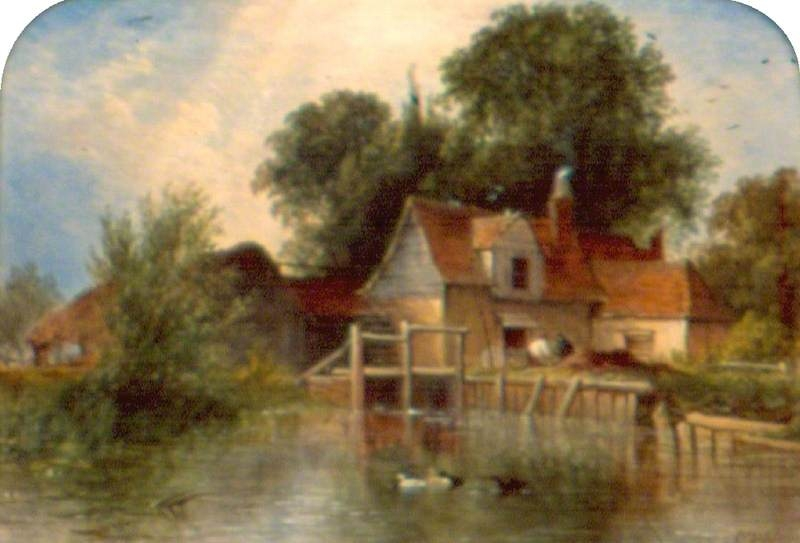
Caroline Fanny Williams
Mapledurham, Berkshire

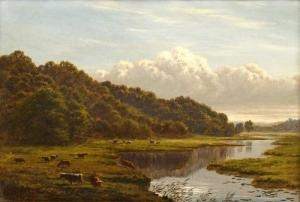
Horace Walter Gilbert
Meads near Egham, Surrey, 1884

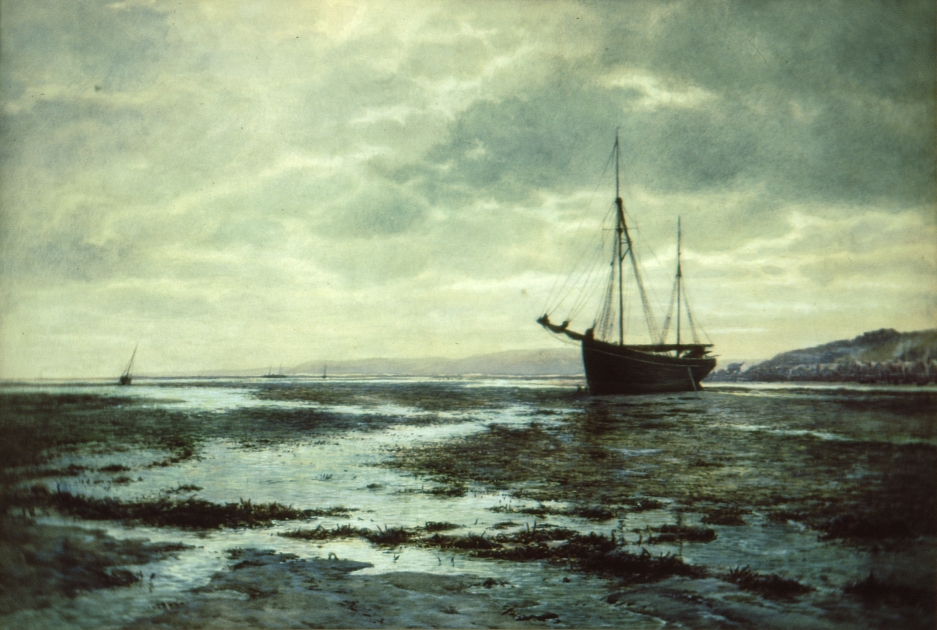
Herbert Sidney Percy
A ship anchored at low tide
