= Edwin Henry Boddington =

English painter

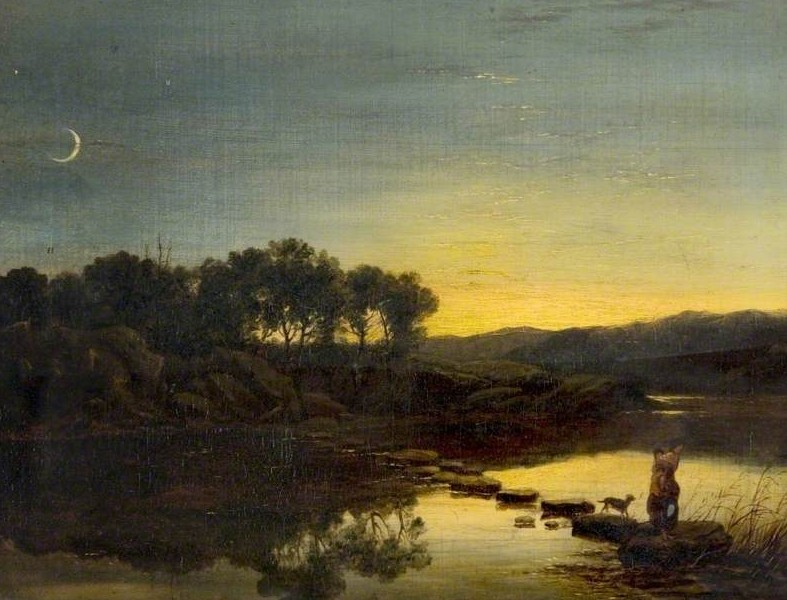
Edwin Henry Boddington Landscape, Sunset

Edwin Henry Boddington Williams (14 October 1836 – 1905) was an English landscape painter during the Victorian era, and a member of the Williams family of painters.

He was born in Islington, the son of the well-known landscape painter Henry John Boddington (born Williams), and he learned to paint from his father. Boddington exhibited at the Royal Academy (11 works), the British Institution (25 works), and Suffolk Street (45 works). He painted mainly views on the Thames River that are illuminated either by sunset or moonlight. Most of his river scenes are painted in very dark greens and browns, and many resemble some of the earlier works of his father.

In the early 1860s, he lived with his wife, Helena, also an artist, in Merrow, Surrey. He was declared bankrupt in 1866 while living near Ampthill, Bedfordshire.

His sons Percy Reginald Boddington (1866–1936) and Henry Frederick Boddington (1870–1940) emigrated to Australia. Examples of his work hang in the Glasgow Museum, Rotherham Museum, Reading Town Hall and the Ealing Central Library.
