= Arthur Gilbert (painter) =

English painter (1819–1895)

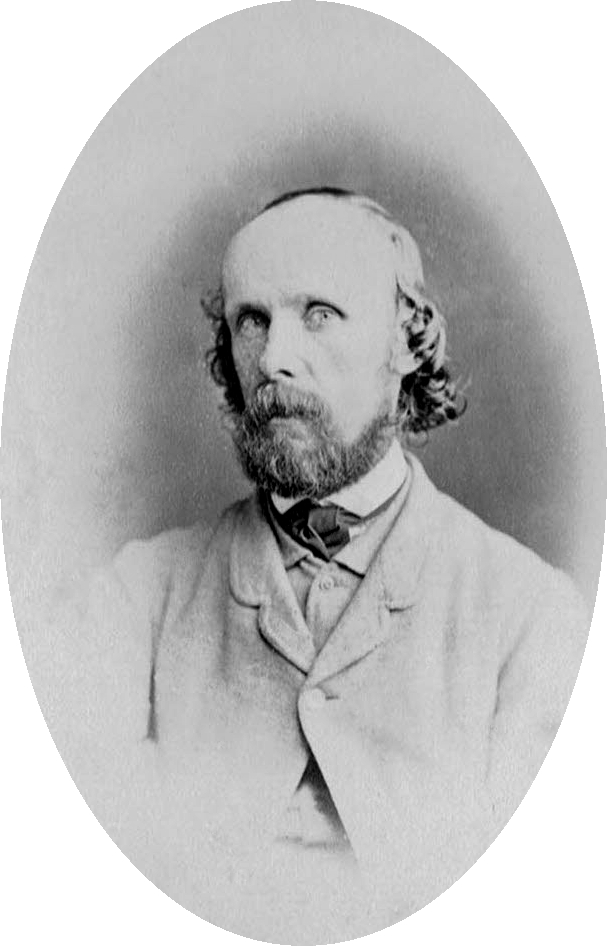
Arthur Gilbert

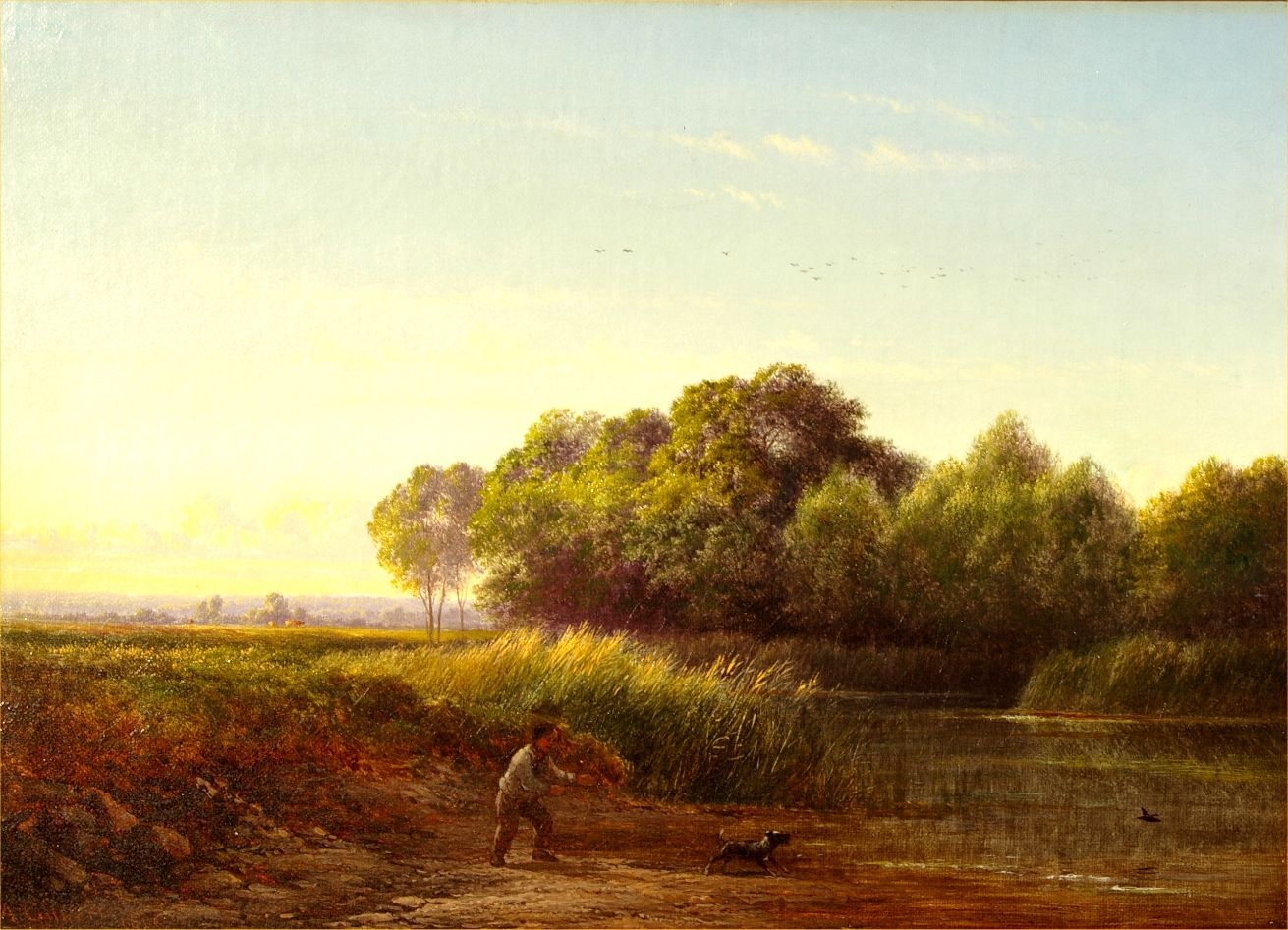
Arthur Gilbert At the Waters Edge, 1866

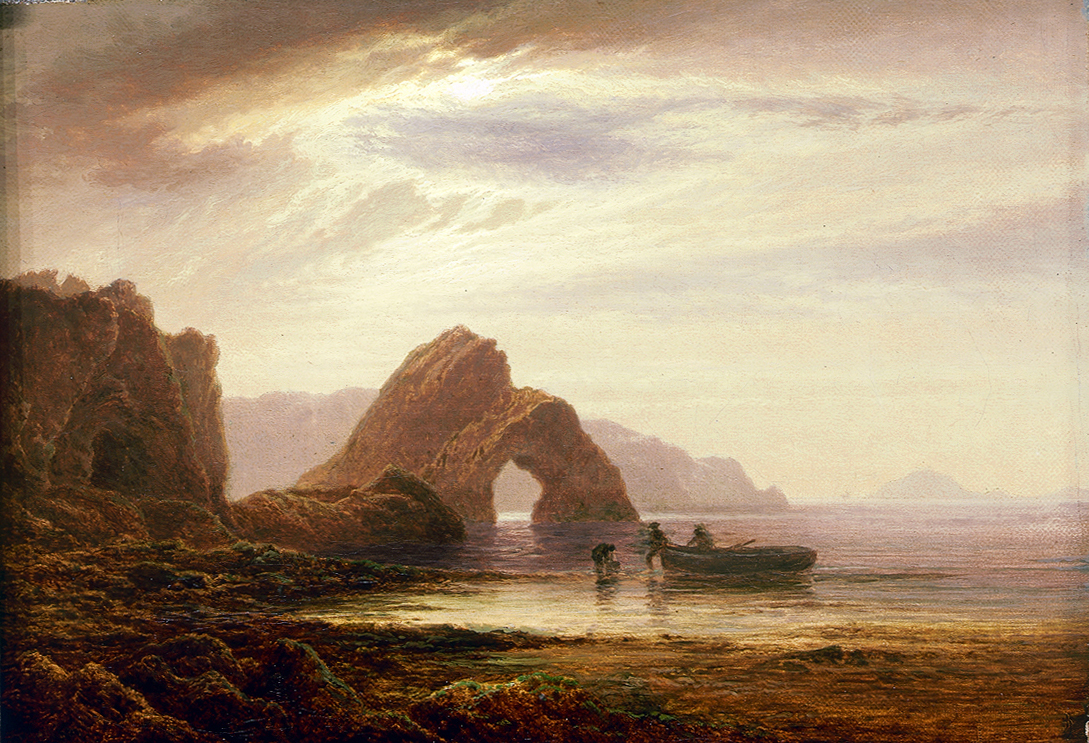
Arthur Gilbert Gilter's Point, Tenby, by Moonlight, c.1873

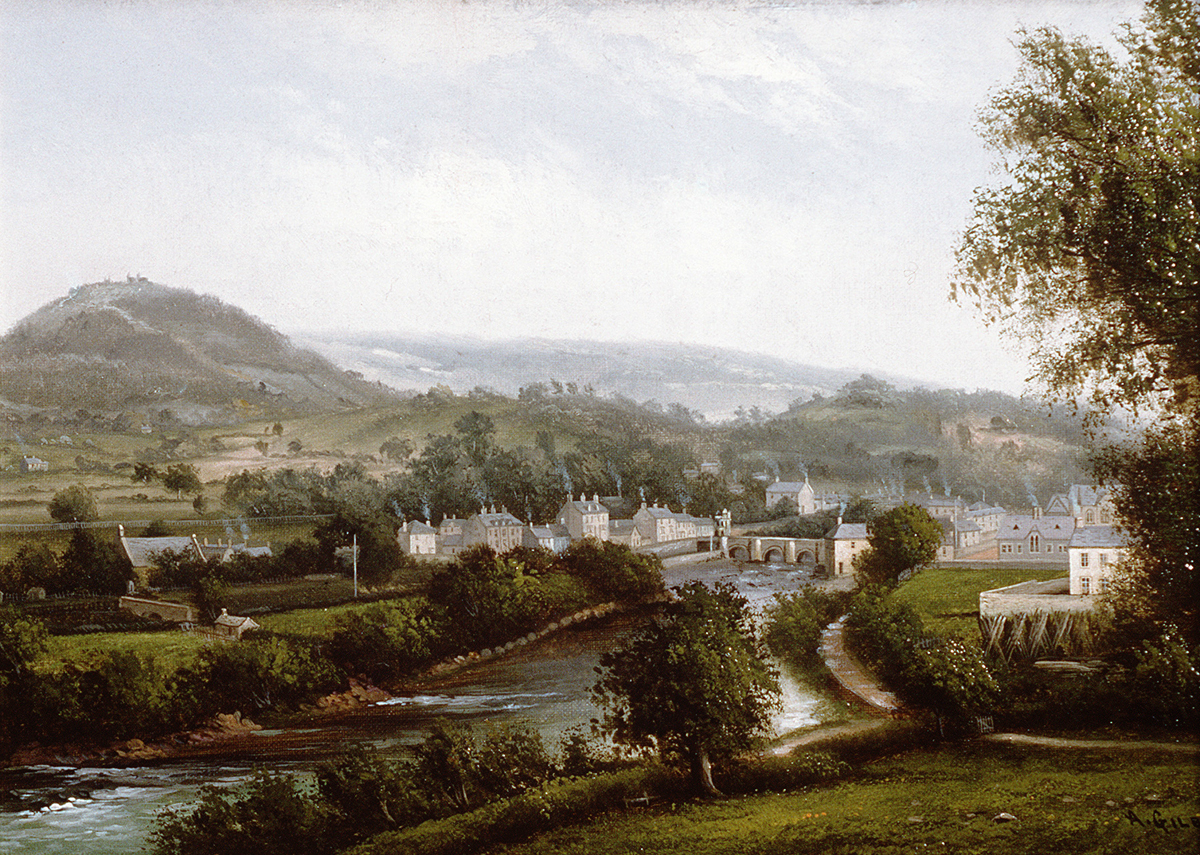
Llangollen; Oil on canvass, 25.2 × 35.5 cm, c. 1880

Arthur Gilbert (19 December 1819 – 21 April 1895) was an English landscape painter during the Victorian era, and a member of the Williams family of painters.

== Biography ==
Arthur Gilbert was born Arthur Gilbert Frederick Williams on 19 December 1819 at Newington Butts Road in South East London. He was the fourth son of the painter Edward Williams (1781–1855) and Ann Hildebrandt (c.1780–1851), and a member of the Williams family of painters, who were related to such famous artists as James Ward, R.A. and George Morland. His father was a well-known landscape artist, who taught him how to paint; otherwise he received no formal instruction.

He married Elizabeth Jane Williams, daughter of John Williams, on 23 January 1843 in St Martin in the Fields. From all accounts Arthur had a gentle disposition and was a most devoted husband and father. In 1848 he lost his first wife, Elizabeth, due to tuberculosis. He was left with their daughter, Kate, who had been born five years prior. He then married his second wife, Sarah Godfrey, the daughter of John Godfrey, a clerk, on 28 June 1854, at the Parish Church in Barnes. Their son Horace was born the following year. Both of his children displayed artistic talent and later painted and exhibited.

Arthur Gilbert had addresses in Weybridge and Hammersmith, but spent most of his years at Lonsdale Terrace in Barnes, close to his father and brothers. He moved to Redhill in 1873 and then to De Tillens in Limpsfield, Surrey. This was his home for many years, to well after the marriage of his son, who produced some fine watercolours of the place. He died 21 April 1895 in Croydon, Surrey.

=== Marriages and children ===
Arthur Gilbert had two wives. He married his first wife Elizabeth Jane Williams (1820–1849) on 23 January 1843 at St. Martin in the Fields, London. After Elizabeth's 1849 death from tuberculosis, he married his second wife Sarah Ann Godfrey (1830–1898) on 28 June 1854 St. Andrew Holburn, London. He had one child born to each of his wives.

1. Kate Elizabeth Ellen Gilbert Williams (1843–1916), born 17 December 1843 in London; and died 15 April 1916 in Sutton, Surrey.
2. Horace Walter Gilbert (1855–1928), born 6 April 1855 in the Kensington district of London; and died in 1928 in the Prescot district of Lancashire.

Both of his children were artists for at least part of their careers.

=== The Williams Family ===
Arthur Gilbert was born into an artist family that is sometimes referred to as the Barnes School. His father and five surviving brothers (listed below) were all noted Victorian landscape painters. He was one of three of the sons of Edward Williams who changed their last names to protect the identity of their art.

- Edward Williams (father)
- Edward Charles Williams
- Henry John Boddington
- George Augustus Williams
- Sidney Richard Percy
- Alfred Walter Williams

== Art ==
Arthur Gilbert became known for painting moonlight and night scenes, as well as stark mountains landscapes, many of which were exhibited in London. He painted also two large pictures of Saint John the Baptist for the "atelier Jacques-Paul Migne" that are part of the triptych of the choir in the gothic church of Audresselles, sea-side village in France (Pas-de-Calais).
