= Edward Charles Williams =

English painter

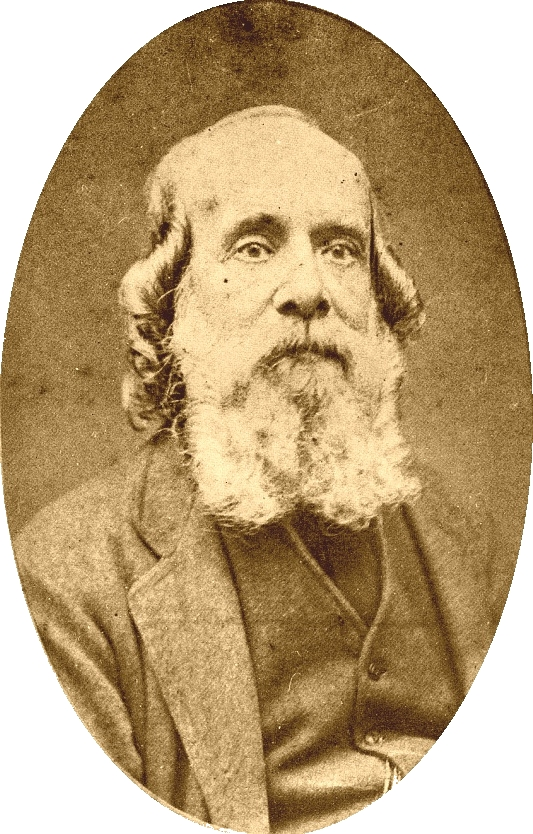
Edward Charles Williams (1807-1881)

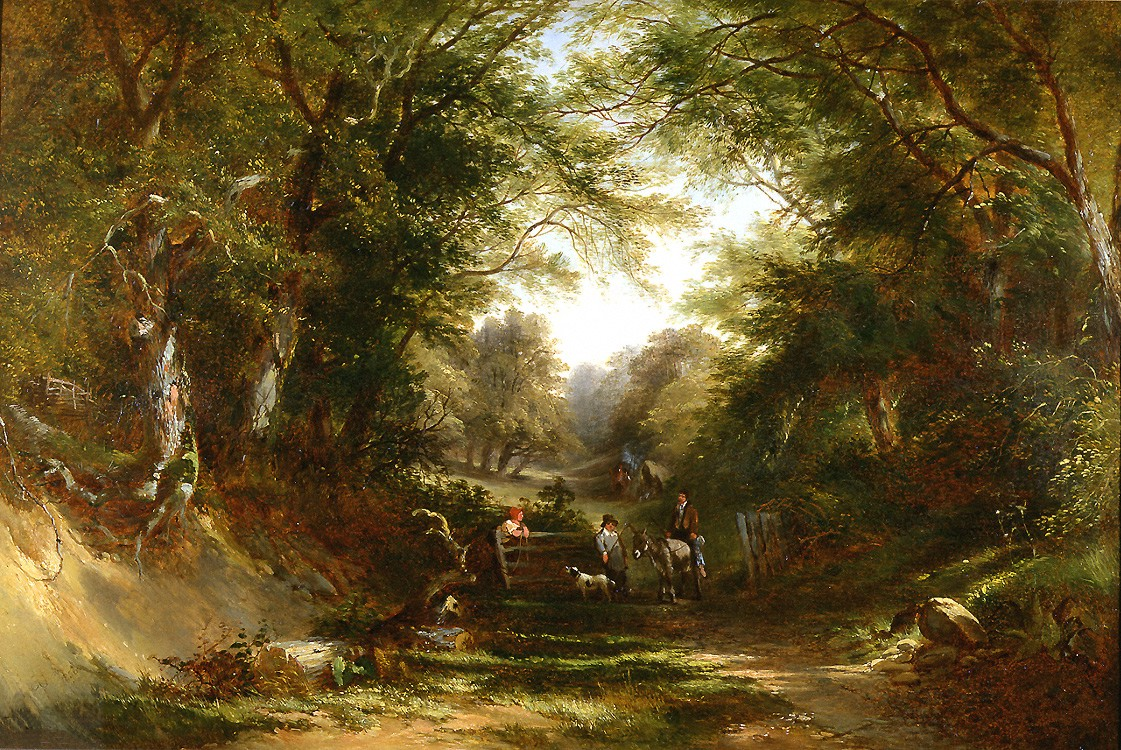
Edward Charles Williams A Shady Lane, 1856

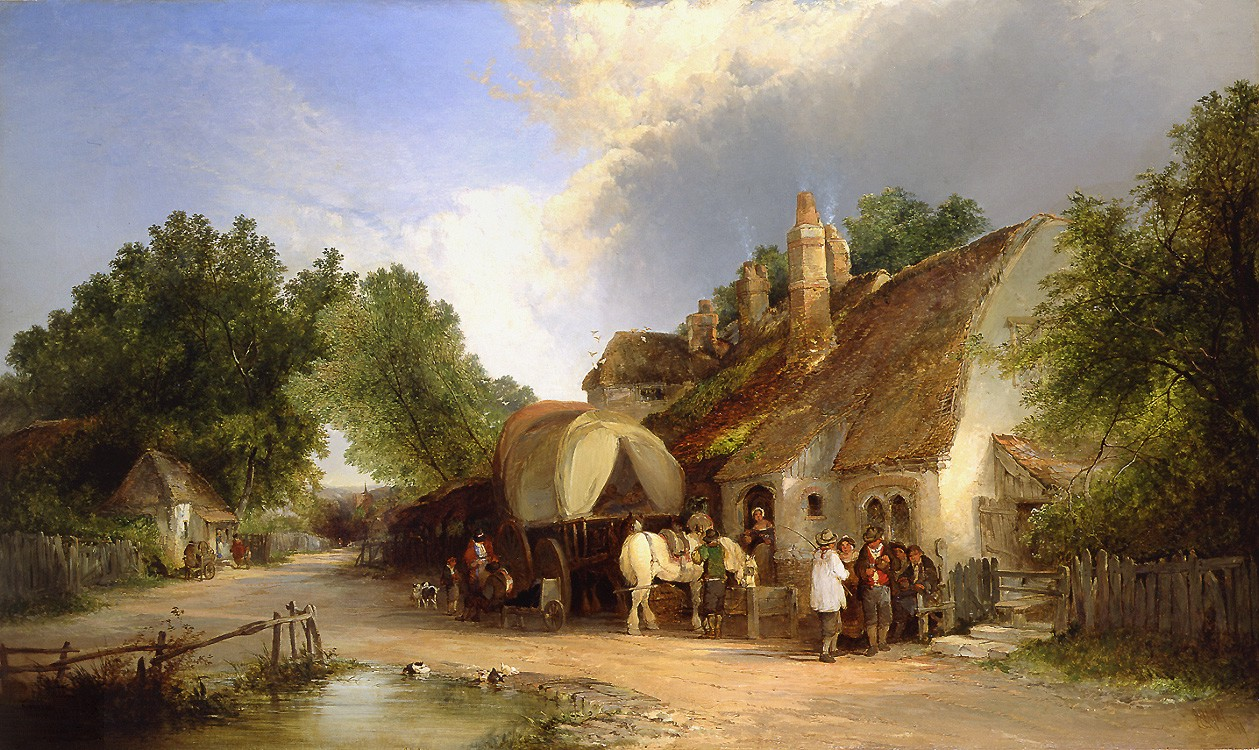
Edward Charles Williams The Old Roadside Inn

Edward Charles Williams (10 July 1807 – 25 July 1881) was an English landscape painter during the Victorian Era, and a member of the Williams family of painters.

== Early life, family and education ==
Edward Charles Williams was born in London, the eldest son of the a well-known painter of landscapes Edward Williams (1781–1855) and Ann Hildebrandt (c.1780–1851). He was part of the Williams family of painters, who were related to such famous artists as James Ward RA and George Morland. His father taught him how to paint; otherwise he received no formal artistic instruction. This family of artists is sometimes referred to as the Barnes School. The father and five surviving sons (Henry John Boddington, George Augustus Williams, Arthur Gilbert, Sidney Richard Percy, Alfred Walter Williams) were all noted landscape painters. Three of the sons of Edward Williams changed their last names to protect the identity of their art.

== Career ==
He adopted much of his father's style and technique, and like the other painters of his family, he devoted himself to landscapes, producing rich and tranquil views of Barnes, Cumberland, Kent, Surrey and the Thames. His paintings are now highly sought after.

He largely stopped painting after the 1859 death of his second wife, adding value to the small number of paintings that he did produce from 1859 on − Springer in the Bracken, The Lap Dog, The Ploughman's walk home, The Ducks at Tilbury and Primrose at St Mary's (Primrose was the Verger's Cat). Some suggest that he suffered a breakdown after his wife's death, given his choice of subjects in these later years. The location of three of these post-1859 works are unknown, and they are assumed lost during two world wars.

He signed some of his work as E Williams, which leads to confusion with his father, who painted in a similar style, and at times he signed as C Williams to purposely avoid such confusion. Because many of the paintings of both father and son are unsigned, it can be difficult to correctly attribute their work. Edward Charles also collaborated on several paintings with William Shayer, where Williams would paint the landscape, and Shayer would add in figures and animals; his Near Wantage, Berkshire is a good example.

== Personal life ==
Williams married his first wife Mary Ann Challenger on 11 December 1839 in Westminster. Mary Ann died in 1857 in London, and his only child Alice Williams was born shortly afterwards to Sarah Susannah Horley, who had been Mary Ann's nurse – Edward and Sarah did not marry for another 10 years until 3 October 3, 1868, when they wed at the St. Pancras Old Church in Camden, London.

He died 25 July 1881 at Shepherd's Bush in London and is buried with Sarah Horley and their daughter Alice in Hammersmith Old Cemetery, close to other family graves.
