= Alfred Walter Williams =

English painter

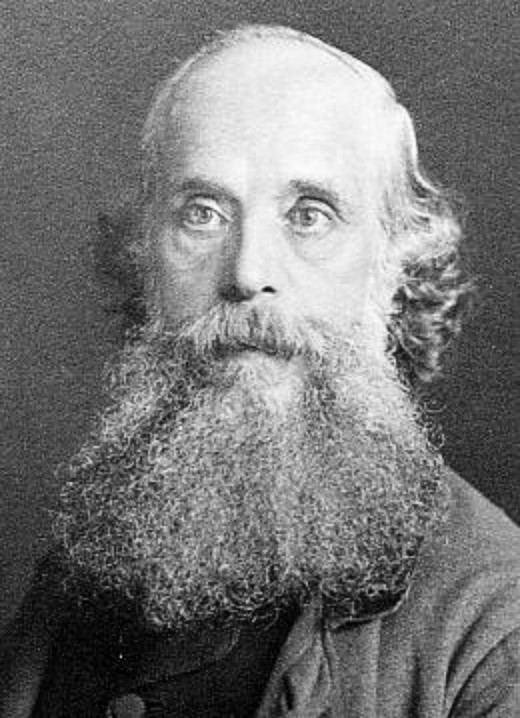
Alfred Walter Williams

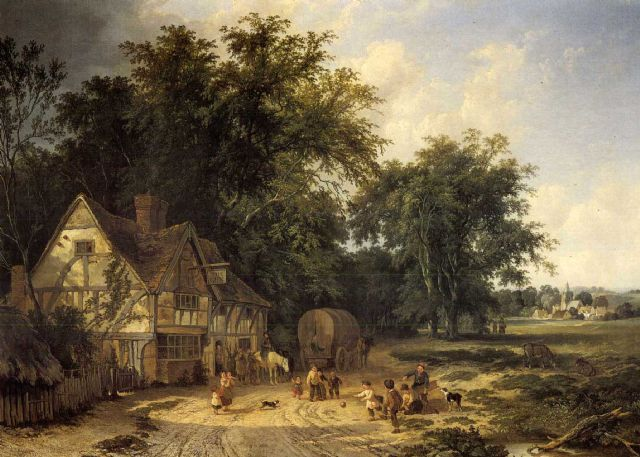
Alfred Walter Williams Playing Football outside the Gun Inn, 1844

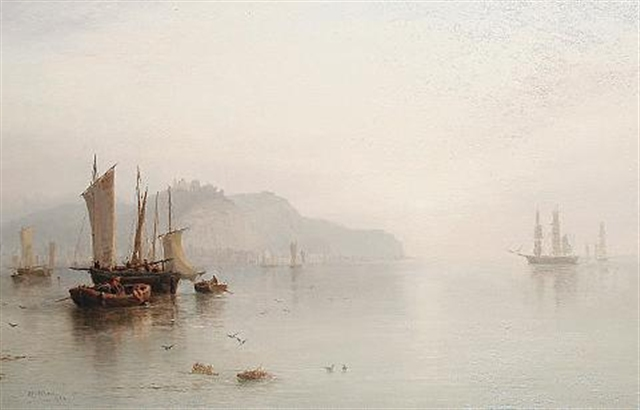
Alfred Walter Williams Off Hastings, Sunrise, 1885

Alfred Walter Williams (18 July 1824 – 16 December 1905) was an English landscape painter during the Victorian era, and a member of the Williams family of painters.

== Biography ==
Alfred Walter Williams was born on 18 July 1824 in Southwark, London, one of identical twins; the second twin, Charles dying shortly after birth. He was the sixth son of the painter Edward Williams (1781-1855) and Ann Hildebrandt (c.1780-1851), and a member of the Williams family of painters, who were related to such famous artists as James Ward, R.A. and George Morland. His father was a well-known landscape artist, who taught him how to paint; otherwise he received no formal instruction.

Alfred's work was first accepted by the Royal Academy in 1843, after which he regularly exhibited there, until 1890. Like his siblings he also exhibited at the Society of British Artists, renamed the Royal Society of British Artists in 1887. With the improved fortunes of Edward Williams' family, they moved in 1846 from Cromer Street to 32 Castelnau, Barnes in Surrey. There the large coach house was put to use as a family studio. The house exists to this day as 92 Castelnau. With the growing fame of the family they were known as the Williams School of painters or simply as the Barnes School. Alfred had a close friendship with his brother Sidney Richard Percy and bride, and he boarded with them in 1857 for a while at their home Florence Villa, in Wimbledon. Alfred Williams exhibited at the Royal Academy from 1843 to 1891 and works exhibited included scenes of the Thames,

Around 1860 Alfred settled in Reigate in Surrey. He is recorded in the 1861 census as boarding with Mr and Mrs Fitzsimon and in 1870 was at Mead Vale in Redhill, Surrey. In 1888, he married Ann HUTCHENCE (née THORNTON) in Reigate and became step-father to Rose Pricilla and Ada Louisa HUTCHENCE. In 1895 he had moved to 40 Croydon Road, Reigate, close to his brother, Arthur Gilbert who lived in Limpsfield. He died at 21 Francis Road, Croydon.

=== The Williams Family ===
Alfred Walter Williams was born into an artist family that is sometimes referred to as the Barnes School. His father and five surviving brothers (listed below) were all noted Victorian landscape painters. Three of the sons of Edward Williams changed their last names to protect the identity of their art.

- Edward Williams (father)
- Edward Charles Williams
- Henry John Boddington
- George Augustus Williams
- Arthur Gilbert
- Sidney Richard Percy

== Art ==
Alfred Walter Williams produced grand and romantic landscapes in the best tradition of the Williams family, which through their popularity became the most successful Victorian family of painters. Alfred became a founder member of the Holmesdale Fine Arts Club, prominent in Reigate from around 1865. He counted amongst his friends Charles Davidson RWS (1820–1902) and a number of other noted artists including Samuel Palmer and the Linnell family. Wales, Scotland and Italy. He was a landscape painter in oils and occasionally watercolor and painted in a similar style to his brother Sidney Percy. According to Graves Dictionary, he exhibited 76 works at the Royal Academy, 42 at the British Institution, 79 at Suffolk Street, 4 at the New Watercolor Society and 108 at various other London exhibitions. One of his paintings is in the Victoria & Albert Museum. The many auction listings for ALFRED WILLIAMS, may be found at artnet.com (93 listings), findartinfo.com (49) and artprice.com (103) etc. His works are also often found in Hislop's Guide to the UK Art Market. His oils reach the thousands, can be found on auction house like Christie's. More biographical information may be found in The Dictionary of Victorian Painters by Christopher Wood, The Dictionary of British Artists, and British Watercolor Artists by Mallalieu.

=== Museums ===
- Victoria and Albert Museum
- National Museums Liverpool
- Sunderland Museum and Winter Gardens
- Shipley Art Gallery
- Atkinson Art Gallery Collection
- Rotherham Museums and Galleries
- Brighton and Hove Museums and Art Galleries
- Leicester Art and Museum Service
- Lambeth London Borough Council
