= Sidney Dolores Bunce =

British and American painter (1892–1965)

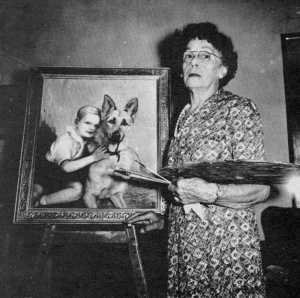
Sidney Dolores Bunce, about 1963

Sidney Dolores Bunce (née Sidney Dolores Percy; 19 August 1892 – 22 December 1965) was a British-born American classically trained portrait artist. She was active in the 1940s through 1960s in Northern California, where she served as director and president of art societies in Santa Cruz and Los Gatos.

== Life and career ==
Sidney Bunce was born Sidney Dolores Percy on 19 August 1892 in Chelsea, the artist's quarter of London, England. She was the daughter of Herbert Sidney Percy and granddaughter of Sidney Richard Percy, both well-known Victorian artists, and members of the Williams family of painters. She began her art studies on leaving school, and studied with her father, and at St John's Wood Art School in London, where she won a scholarship to the Royal Academy of Arts at Burlington House in London. However, the donating institution withdrew her scholarship when they discovered she was a woman and not a man.

She immigrated in 1921 to Canada where she married Henry John "Jack" Bunce, with whom she moved in 1923 to California, living for several years in Pasadena before moving in 1936 to Madera, California, where they lived until 1946 when they settled in Santa Cruz. She retired with Jack in 1959 to Saratoga. It was in Santa Cruz that she became associated with the Santa Cruz Art League, with whom she served for several years on the Board of Directors, and held various posts, such as Exhibition Chair and General Chair of the 1953 State Wide Exhibit. She then became associated in 1959 with the Los Gatos Art Association, serving with them as a Director and President of the Association.

Sidney was proficient in several painting styles, having trained partly with her father, who was both a noted portrait artist (in oils), and competent watercolor landscape painter. However, she was known primarily for her pastel portraits. She also taught painting classes in both watercolor and oils for several years for the Los Gatos Art Association. She died on 22 December 1965, in San Jose, although her residence at the time was Saratoga, California. She is buried in Los Gatos Memorial Park.
