= Herbert Sidney Percy =

English painter

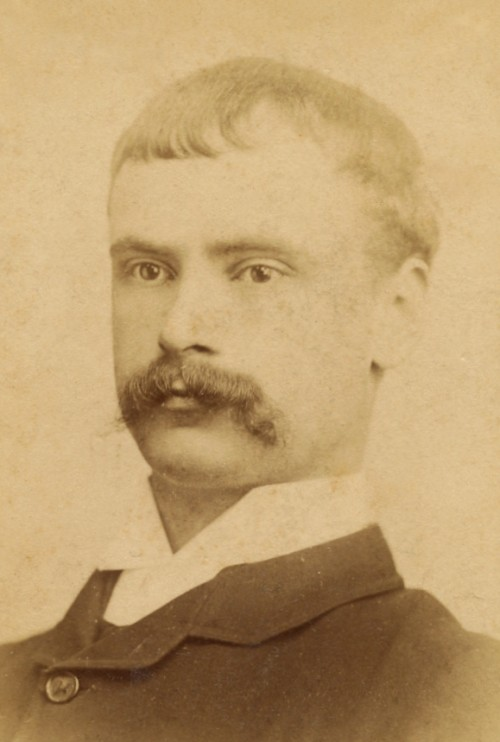
Herbert Sidney Percy about 1910

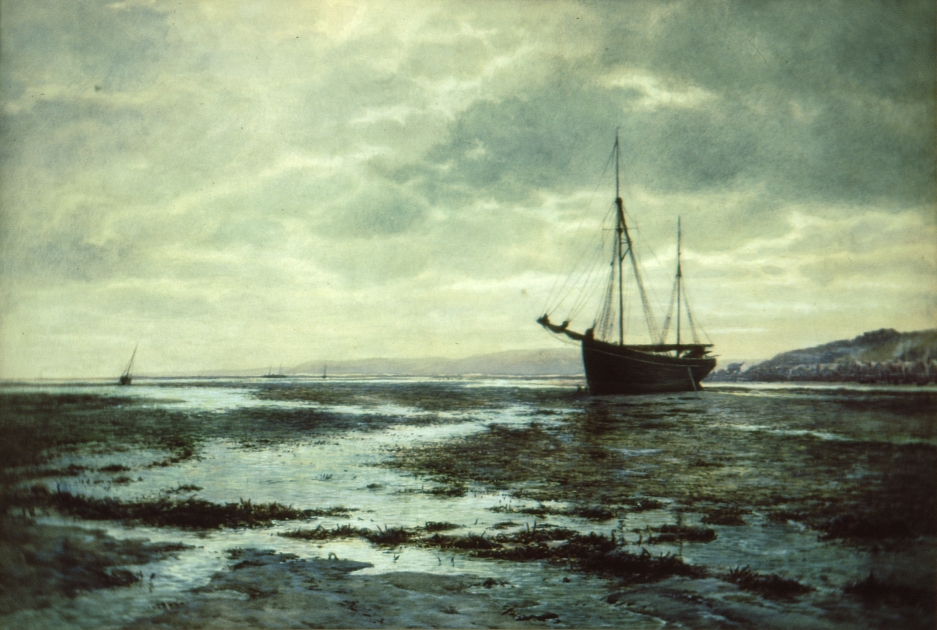
Herbert Sidney Percy A ship anchored at low tide

Herbert Sidney Percy (18 February 1863 – 8 October 1932) was a member of the Williams family of painters who painted mainly portraits, but also produced some fine landscapes of the English countryside.

Percy was the youngest son of the popular Victorian landscape painter Sidney Richard Percy and Emily Fairlam, his father being a member of the Williams family of painters. He married Maud Thompson, who was the sister of the well-known Shakespearean actress Constance Crawley. His sister Amy Dora Percy became a novelist under the pen name of Mrs. Fred Reynolds.

Percy entered the Royal Academy of Art Schools in December 1881 at the age of 18, and spent two three-year terms there, earning two silver medals. Although he was a competent landscape artist, he considered himself primarily a portrait and miniature painter, as these brought in the large commissions, and his portraits hang in the homes of many prominent English families. He also painted some impressionist pieces, worked as a picture restorer, and prepared engravings, often from his own line drawings, for books and magazines. He was a close friend of the writer G.K. Chesterton, and some of Chesterton's books are illustrated with Percy's engravings.

He exhibited one painting at the Royal Academy, and eight works with the Society of British Artists. He was also a frequent exhibitor with the Royal Society of Painters in Oil and Watercolours. His portrait of Captain James Wood hangs in the Royal Marines Museum in Portsmouth, Hampshire. His daughter Sidney Dolores Bunce became a noted California painter.
