= Henry John Boddington =

English landscape painter

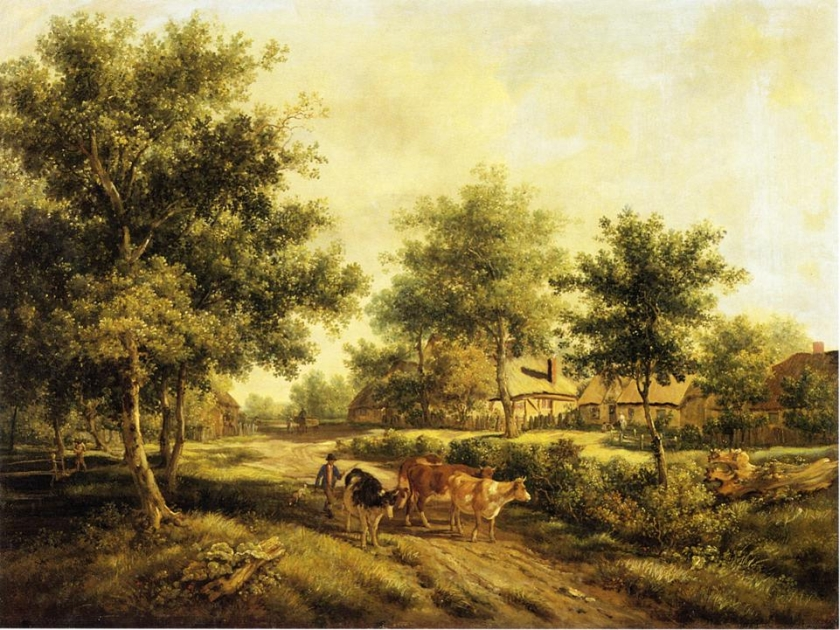
Henry John Boddington A Norfolk Hamlet, 1840

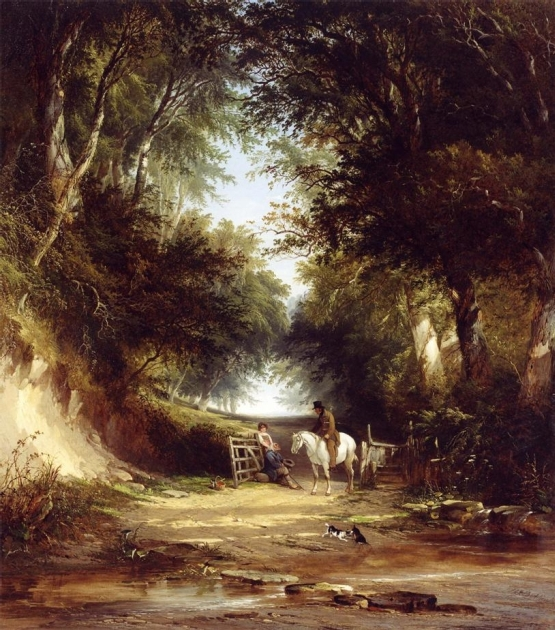
Henry John Boddington A Path Through the Woods, 1851

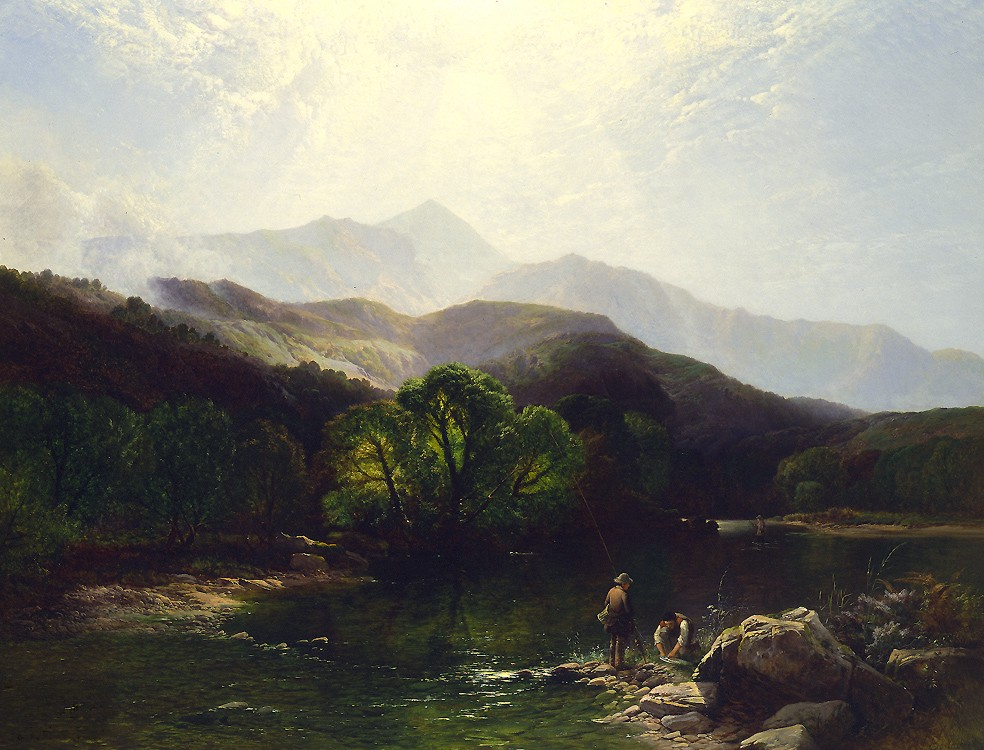
Henry John Boddington A Trout Stream, North Wales

Henry John Boddington (1811 – 11 April 1865) was an English landscape painter during the Victorian era, and a member of the Williams family of painters.

== Biography ==
Henry John Boddington was born Henry John Williams on 14 October 1811 in London. He was the second son of the painter Edward Williams (1781-1855) and Ann Hildebrandt (c.1780-1851), and a member of the Williams family of painters, who were related to such famous artists as James Ward, R.A. and George Morland. His father was a well-known landscape artist, who taught him how to paint; otherwise he received no formal instruction.

In 1832, when just of age, he married Clarissa (Clara) Eliza Boddington (daughter of John Boddington), and adopted her surname, becoming Henry John Boddington, in order to distinguish his work from that of his brothers and other relatives; They had one child, Edwin Henry Boddington, (14 October 1836, Islington – 1905), who also became a painter. After a few years of great poverty and struggle, Henry John became a very prosperous artist. He lived first at Pentonville, then moved to Fulham, then Hammersmith, and finally in 1854 to Barnes, then in Surrey.

His earliest pictures depicted the scenery of Surrey and the banks of the Thames. Work of his was first exhibited at the Royal Academy, London in 1837, and from 1839 onwards one or two of his pictures were exhibited there every year until his death and four years after it. He showed even more paintings at the Society of British Artists in Suffolk Street. His name appears for the first time in the catalogue for 1837, and in 1842 became a member of the society (RBA), afterwards exhibiting there an average of ten pictures a year until his death. In 1843 he visited Devon, staying at Ashburton; in 1846 the English Lake District; and in 1847, for the first time, North Wales, which, especially the country around Betws-Y-Coed and Dolgelly, became his favourite working-ground. Boddington also painted in Scotland, Yorkshire, and other parts of England, but never travelled to the continent.

The Dictionary of National Biography described Boddington as "of a humorous, amiable, and manly character". After suffering for several years from a progressive disease of the brain, he died at his home in Barnes on 11 April 1865 and is buried nearby in Barnes Cemetery.

=== The Williams Family ===
Henry John Boddington was born into an artist family that is sometimes referred to as the Barnes School. His father and five surviving brothers (listed below) were all noted landscape painters during the Victorian era. Henry was one of three sons of Edward Williams who changed their last names to protect the identity of their art.

- Edward Williams (father)
- Edward Charles Williams
- George Augustus Williams
- Arthur Gilbert
- Sidney Richard Percy
- Alfred Walter Williams

== Art ==
Boddington developed his own style, characterised by a remarkable ability to depict the foliage of backlit trees. Jan Reynolds (1975) observed that one of his "most characteristic effects is the appearance of a warm day, with the sun just out of the picture, giving a filmy, hazy atmosphere to the landscape, with deep blue shadows adding greater value to the opposing tone of yellow. The distant mountains are melting in vapory sunlight. The artist is a master of this effect..." Like many Victorian painters, he worked on a grand scale. The Fine Arts Quarterly Review (Vol. 3, 1865) noted that he "painted pictures not only large, but sometimes grand. His landscapes of mountains, lake and river had scenic breadth and power..." His paintings mostly depict peaceful English country scenes. He was a very rapid sketcher.
