= Horace Walter Gilbert =

English painter (1855–1928)

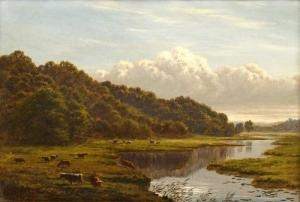
Horace Walter Gilbert Meads near Egham, Surrey

Horace Walter Gilbert (1855-1928) was an English landscape painter during the Victorian era, and a member of the Williams family of painters.

He was born Horace Walter Gilbert-Williams on 6 April 1855 in the Kensington district of London, being the only child of the well-known Victorian landscape painter Arthur Gilbert and Gilbert's second wife Sarah Ann Godfrey. He initially became a landscape painter, like his father, and his older step-sister Kate Gilbert, but ultimately he decided to pursue instead a career as a civil servant and university lecturer. Prior to this, he exhibited at the Royal Academy and at Suffolk Street. He painted mainly landscapes of the Thames River and of the low hills near his home in Surrey, with many of his paintings showing water and/or meadows in the foreground, fronting dense thickets of dark green trees, against a backdrop of cloudy skies. His use of dark greens contrast with the soft earth tones of stark mountain scapes that characterize much of the work of his father. He also painted several nice watercolors of his father's home at De Tillens in Limpsfield, Surrey. He retired to Lancashire, where he died in 1928 in the Prescot registration district.
