= Caroline Fanny Williams =

English painter

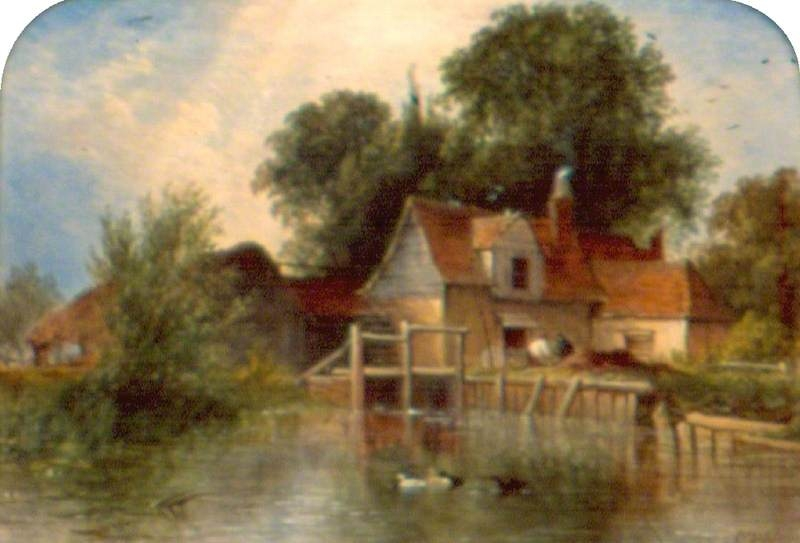
Caroline Fanny Williams Mapledurham, Berkshire

Caroline Fanny Williams (1836–1921) was an English landscape painter during the Victorian era, and a member of the Williams family of painters.

Caroline Fanny Williams was born on 25 December 1836 in St. Marylebone, London. Her father George Augustus Williams (1814–1901) was a popular landscape artist and a member of the Williams family of painters. She learned to paint from her father, and her works are somewhat similar to his in subject and treatment, but with much brighter colors. Her technical ability was the equal or better to that of many of her male counterparts of the time, but despite the support of her father, she lived in an age where society did not encourage women in the arts.

She exhibited at the Royal Academy (12 works), the British Institution (19 works), the Suffolk Street Gallery of the Society of British Artists (64 works), and exhibited in many lesser-known Victorian art venues as well, especially the Society of Lady Artists where she was a regular contributor. She never married, and died under her maiden name on 30 December 1921 at Forest Hill, London. Three examples of her work are on display at the Reading Museum & Town Hall in Berkshire.
