= George Augustus Williams =

English painter

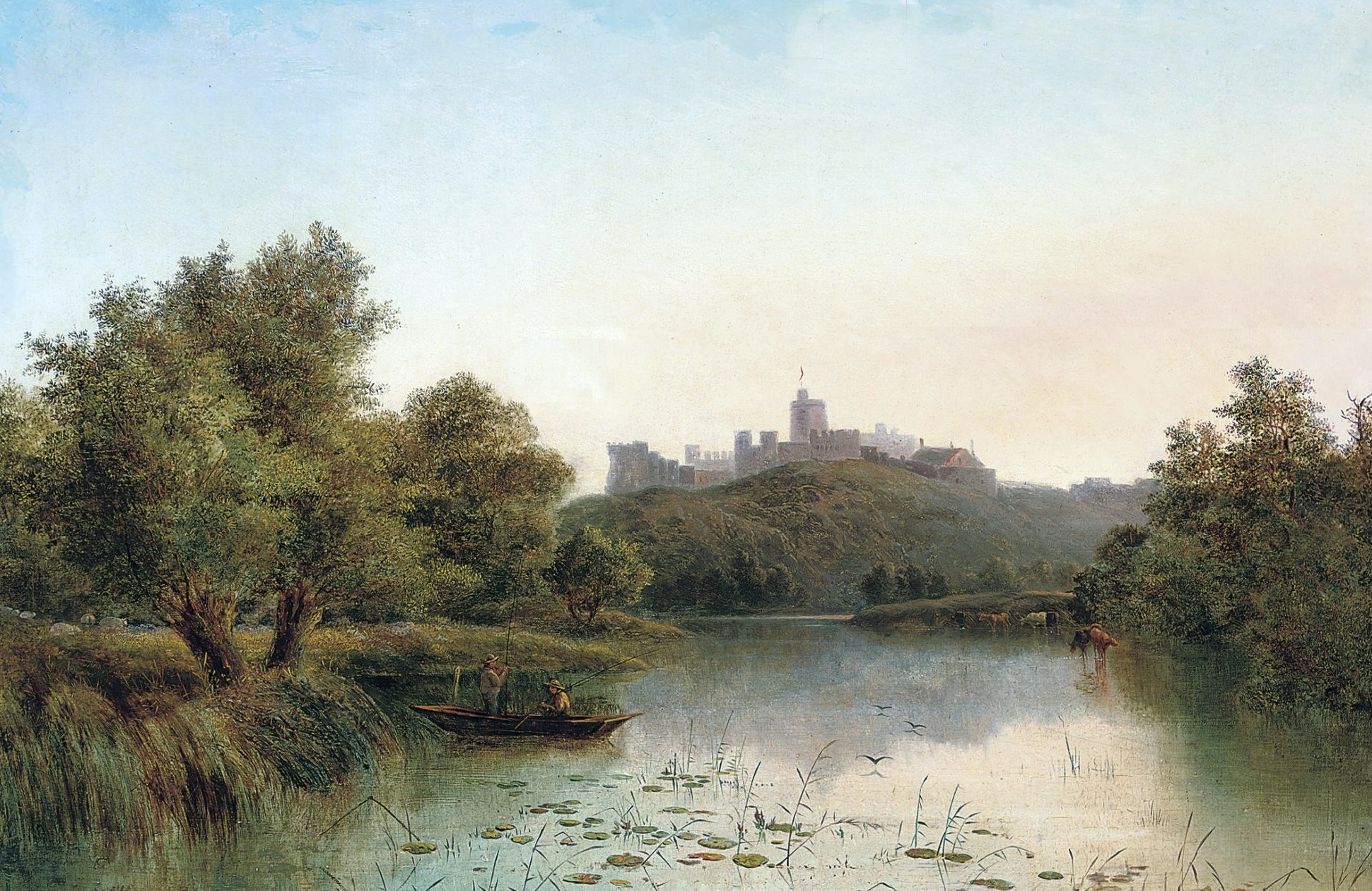
George Augustus Williams Windsor Castle from the Thames

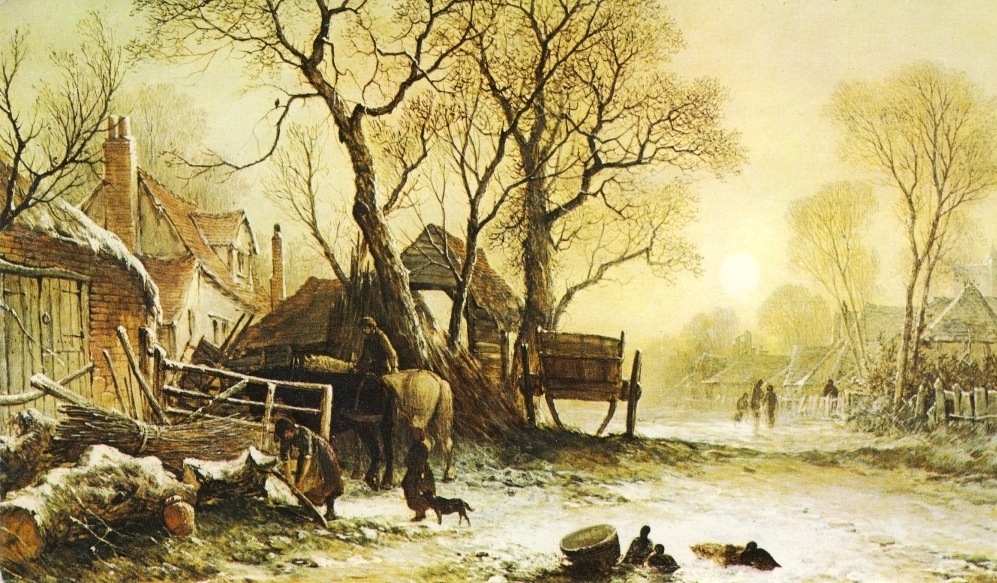
George Augustus Williams Barnes Common in Winter

George Augustus Williams (4 May 1814 – 26 May 1901) was an English landscape painter during the Victorian era, and a member of the Williams family of painters.

== Biography ==
George Augustus Williams was born on 4 May 1814 in London. He was the third son of the painter Edward Williams (1781–1855) and Ann Hildebrandt (c.1780–1851), and a member of the Williams family of painters, who were related to such famous artists as James Ward, R.A. and George Morland. His father was a well-known landscape artist, who taught him how to paint; otherwise he received no formal instruction.

George Augustus painted riverscapes of the Thames, moonlit landscapes, seascapes and views of Kent, Wales and elsewhere. After having four children, George and Caroline moved to Barnes, London, within a stone's throw of the Thames, where they lived for more than fifty years.

George undoubtedly inherited his artistic talent, as did his siblings, from his father. His work, though, is distinct from that of the others in his family. His paintings were mainly exhibited at Suffolk Street as well as at the Royal Academy from 1841 onwards, the British Institution and elsewhere.

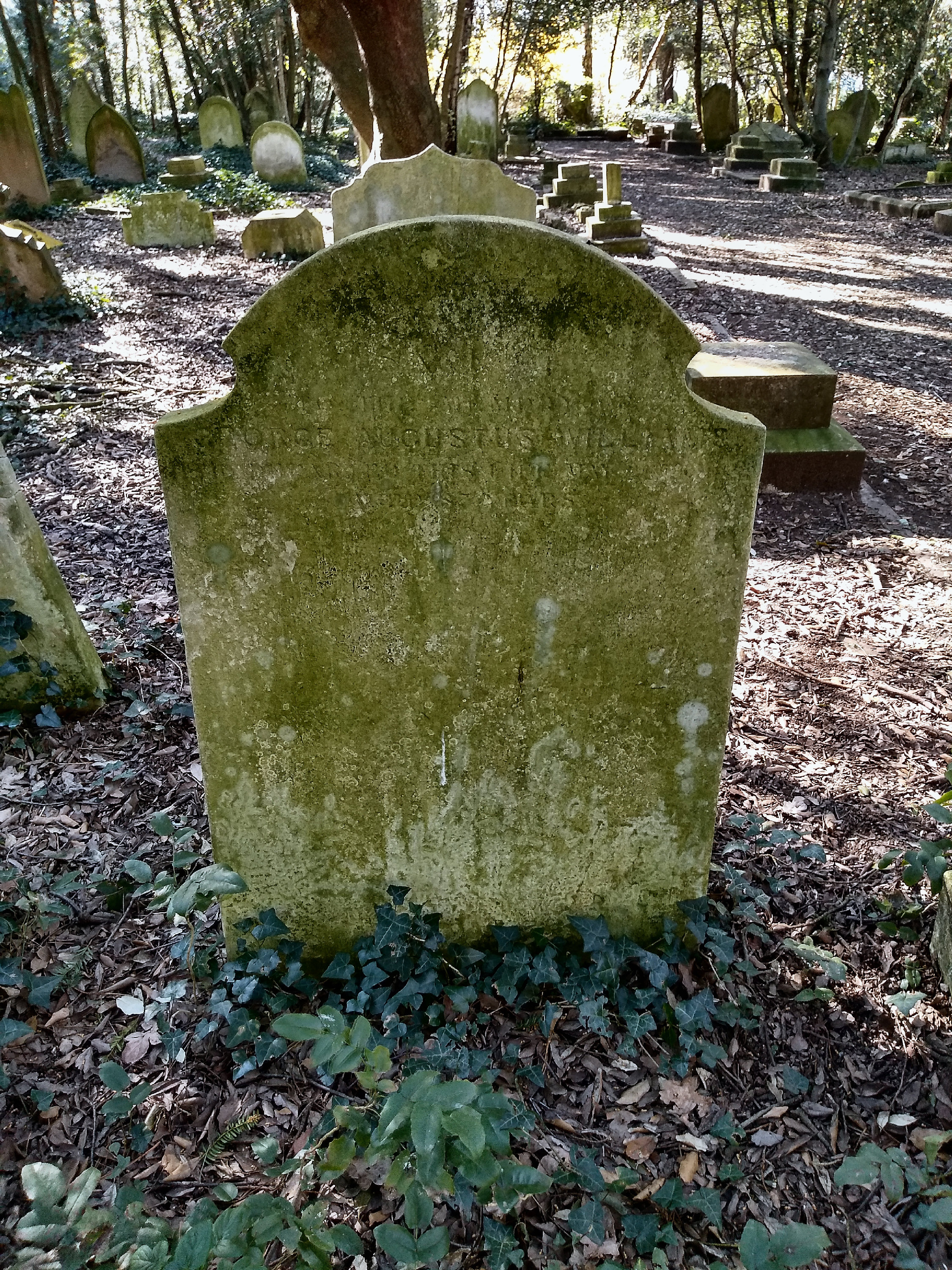
Barnes Old Cemetery

George's wife Caroline died sometime before the 1861 U.K. census was taken, after which his daughter, named Caroline also, became his housekeeper, foregoing marriage to take care of her father. He died forty years later at the age of 87 on 26 May 1901 in Barnes, London and is buried nearby in Barnes Cemetery.

=== Marriage and children ===
George married Caroline Smith (b. 1814), the daughter of Abraham and Charlotte Smith, on 19 February 1835 at St. Pancras Church in Camden, London. They had five children.

1. Walter Williams (1834–1906), born 29 November 1834 in London; and died 14 April 1906 in Richmond, Surrey.
2. Caroline Fanny Williams (1836–1921), born 5 December 1836 in St Marylebone, London; and died 30 December 1921 in Forest Hill, London.
3. Francis Augustus Williams (1837–?), born 26 May 1837 in London; but nothing more is known about him.
4. Frederick Charles Williams (1840–?), born 1840 in the Islington district of London; and probably died sometime before 1881.
5. Albert Williams, probably died young, but nothing about him is known for sure.

=== The Williams Family ===
George Augustus Williams was born into an artist family that is sometimes referred to as the Barnes School. His father and five surviving brothers (listed below) were all noted Victorian landscape painters. Three of the sons of Edward Williams changed their last names to protect the identity of their art.

- Edward Williams (father)
- Edward Charles Williams
- Henry John Boddington
- Arthur Gilbert
- Sidney Richard Percy
- Alfred Walter Williams
