= Dawes (surname) =

Dawes is a surname.

== Notable people with the surname include ==
- Al-Amir Dawes (born 2001), American basketball player
- Albert Dawes (1907–1973), English association footballer
- Alfred Dawes, Jamaican politician
- Andrew Dawes (disambiguation), multiple people
- Belle Dawes (born 2001), Australian rules footballer
- Beman Gates Dawes (1870–1953), politician and oil executive who served two terms as a Republican Congressman from Ohio
- Caro Dawes (1866–1957) wife of Vice President Charles G. Dawes, second lady of the United States from 1925 to 1929
- Charles G. Dawes (1865–1951), banker, politician and 30th Vice President of the United States
- Christie Dawes (born 1980), Australian wheelchair racer
- Christopher Dawes (disambiguation), multiple people
- David Dawes (born 1964), Australian co-founder of the XFree86 project
- Dominique Dawes (born 1976), United States gymnast
- Edward Dawes (1805–1856), British Liberal Member of Parliament (MP) for the Isle of Wight 1851–1852
- Eva Dawes (1912–2009), Canadian track and field athlete
- Fred Dawes (1911–1989), English association footballer
- Henry L. Dawes (1816–1903), United States Senator of Massachusetts, who sponsored the Dawes Act
- Henry May Dawes (1877–1952), American businessman and banker from a prominent Ohio family
- Ian Dawes (born 1963), former professional footballer
- James W. Dawes (1844–1918), Republican Nebraska politician best known as the sixth governor of Nebraska
- John Dawes (1940–2021), Welsh rugby union player
- Johnny Dawes (born 1964), British rock climber
- Johnny Dawes (1955–1989), American actor, filmmaker, and model
- Julian Dawes (born 1942), English composer
- Karl Friedrich Griffin Dawes (1861–1941), Norwegian politician for the Liberal Party
- Kwame Dawes (born 1962), poet, actor, editor, critic, musician and professor of English at the University of South Carolina in Columbia
- Marylou Dawes (1933–2013), Canadian pianist
- Melanie Dawes (born 1966), British economist and civil servant
- Neville Dawes (1926–1984), novelist and poet born in Nigeria of Jamaican parentage
- Nigel Dawes (born 1985), Canadian ice hockey left winger
- Richard Dawes (disambiguation)
- Rufus Dawes (1838–1899), U.S. military officer in the American Civil War
- Rufus C. Dawes (1867–1940), American businessman from a prominent Ohio family
- Sophie Dawes, Baronne de Feuchères (c. 1795–1840), English-born adventuress best known as a mistress of Louis Henry II, Prince of Condé
- Thomas Dawes (1731–1809), American soldier, colonel in the American Revolution
- William Dawes (1745–1799), American activist in the American Revolution
- William Dawes (bishop) (1671–1724), 3rd Baronet Dawes, bishop of Chester from 1708 to 1714
- William Dawes (British Marines officer) (1762–1836), Australian pioneer and scientist
- William Rutter Dawes (1799–1868), British astronomer
- Zach Dawes (born 1985), American musician

== Fictional characters ==
- George Dawes, a character from Shooting Stars portrayed by Matt Lucas
- Marjorie Dawes, a character from Little Britain portrayed by Matt Lucas
- Nancy Dawes, a character in the novel series The Baby-sitters Club and Baby-sitters Little Sister
- Rachel Dawes, a character in the film Batman Begins

== See also ==
- Daws (name), given name and nickname
- Dawe (surname)
