= Dawe (surname) =

Dawe is a surname. Notable people with the surname include:

- Billie Dawe (1924–2013), Canadian ice hockey player
- Bruce Dawe (1930–2020), Australian poet
- Bryan Dawe (born 1948), Australian writer, comedian, and photographer
- Carlton Dawe (1865–1935), Australian author
- Cedric Dawe (1906–1996), British art director
- Charles Dawe (1845–1908), Newfoundland merchant and politician
- Eli Dawe (1843–1930), Newfoundland merchant and politician
- Elle Dawe (born 1981), Australian actress
- Eric Dawe (1921–2015), Canadian politician from Newfoundland and Labrador
- Gabriel Dawe (born 1973), Mexican-American artist
- George Dawe (1781–1829), English portrait artist
- Gerald Dawe (1952–2024), Northern Irish writer and poet
- Gordon Dawe (1938–2011), Canadian politician from Newfoundland and Labrador
- Graham Dawe (born 1959), English rugby footballer
- Henry Dawe (1790–1848), English engraver and subject painter
- Henry Dawe (politician) (1850–1921), Newfoundland sealing captain and politician
- James Dawe (1844–1919), New Zealand cricketer
- John Dawe (1928–2013), Australian sailor
- Leonard Dawe (1889–1963), English amateur footballer, who later compiled crosswords for the Daily Telegraph newspaper
- Nathan Dawe (born 1994), English DJ and producer
- Norman Dawe (1898–1948), Canadian sports referee and executive
- Peter Dawe (born 1954), British Internet entrepreneur
- Philip Dawe (1730–1832), English engraver and political cartoonist
- Robert Shaen Dawe (1900–1992), American actor known as "Robert Shayne"
- Roger D. Dawe (1934–2020), British classical scholar
- Ron Dawe (born 1944), Canadian politician from Newfoundland and Labrador
- TJ Dawe (born 1974), Canadian playwright and director
- Tom Dawe (born 1940), Canadian writer from Newfoundland and Labrador
- Tony Dawe (born 1948), British sound engineer
- William Dawe (cricketer) (1825–1912), New Zealand cricketer

== Disambiguation pages ==
- Brian Dawe (disambiguation)
- Jason Dawe (disambiguation)
- Robert Dawe (disambiguation)

== See also ==
- Daw (surname)
- Daou (disambiguation)#People, list of people with the surname
- Dawes (surname)
- Clarke and Dawe, Australian news satire television program
