= Edward Williams (engraver) =

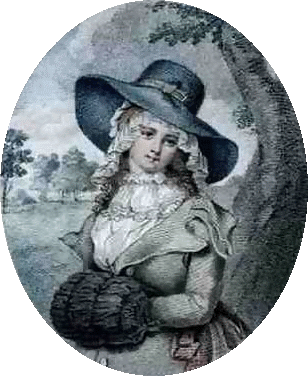
The Lovely Brunette (after William Ward), engraved by Edward Williams, published by Thomas Prattent, 1786

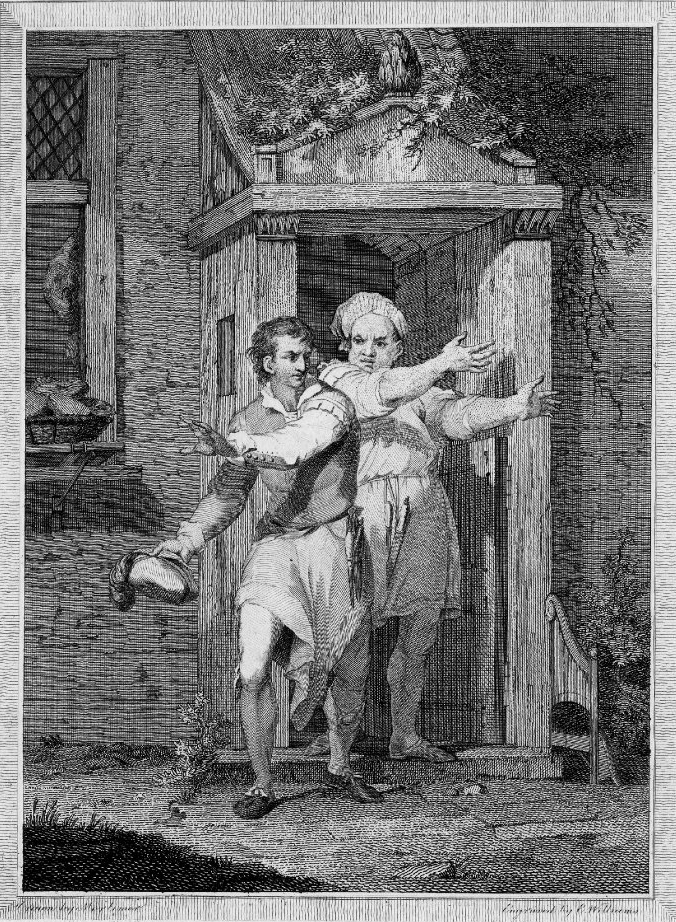
Coke and Perkin (after John Hamilton Mortimer), engraved by Edward Williams, published by John Raphael Smith, 1787

Edward Williams (c.1755–1797?) was an engraver who lived in London in the late 1700s, and engraved several prints after Thomas Rowlandson and William Ward. Although a competent engraver, he is remembered primarily for being the father of Edward Williams the Victorian landscape painter.

Williams is said to have been born about 1755, though this is not certain, and he is said to have known the celebrated painter and engraver William Hogarth (1697-1764), which would make Williams about 9 years old when Hogarth died. As 9 is the age during the Georgian era when many apprenticeships began, this means that Williams may have briefly studied under Hogarth. He eventually became an engraver as well and some of his work was subsequently published by the master of mezzotint engraving John Raphael Smith.

Williams became friends with the brothers William Ward and James Ward, both engravers who had apprenticed under Smith, and he had at least two children born out of wedlock with their 18-year-old sister Mary Ward (1764-1832), before finally marrying her in 1788, some six years after the fact. This marriage made Williams a brother-in-law as well to the animal painter George Morland, and Morland's biographer John Hassell (1806) tells us that Williams and Morland were in fact drinking companions. Another member of this notorious group was the caricaturist Thomas Rowlandson, who like Morland is remembered as much for his exploits at the taverns as for his art.

Williams produced several engravings of Rowlandson's caricatures, most notably A College Scene, and another titled Polygamy, a copy of which is in the Royal Collection. He also engraved an illustration by Henry Wigstead titled The Country Vicar's Fireside, and another by John Hamilton Mortimer titled The Coke and Perkin, the latter in a set of prints of Chaucer's Canterbury Tales in the British Museum. These were all published from 1785 to 1787, some by John Raphael Smith and others by Thomas Prattent.

Mary Ward within a few years left Edward Williams for another man, leaving behind their son, who was named after his father the engraver. The younger Edward Williams went on to become a very successful landscape artist, following in the tradition of his artist uncle James Ward, but he is best known for raising six sons, all successful landscape painters in their own right, who are collectively known as the Williams family of painters. Edward Williams the engraver probably died in 1797 or before, as Henry Robert Morland, the father of George Morland, died that same year, and he is said before his death to have asked Mary Ward's brother James as to the circumstances of Edward Williams' demise.
