= Dawe =

Dawe may refer to:

- Dawe (surname)
- Dawé, Benin
- DAWE (Department of Agriculture, Water and the Environment), Australian government department

== See also ==
- Daw (disambiguation)
- Daou (disambiguation)
- Dawes (disambiguation)
- Dawe Kachen, Ethiopia
- Dawe Serara, Ethiopia
