= Dawes =

Dawes may refer to:

== Places ==
=== Australia ===
- Dawes (Parish), New South Wales
- Dawes Point, New South Wales

=== United States ===
- Dawes Arboretum, in Newark, Ohio
- Dawes County, Nebraska
- Dawes Township, Thurston County, Nebraska

== Other uses ==
- Dawes (band), an American rock band
- Dawes (lunar crater)
- Dawes (Martian crater)
- Dawes (surname)
- Dawes Act of 1887, US law regarding allocation of Native American tribal land
  - Dawes Commission
  - Dawes Rolls
- Dawes Cycles, a British bicycle manufacturer
- Dawes Plan, a 1924 plan to resolve the World War I reparations

== See also ==
- Daw (disambiguation)
- Dawe (disambiguation)
- Daws (disambiguation)
- Simon Dawes, an American rock band
- Dawes' limit, a formula to express the maximum resolving power of a microscope or telescope
