= Daw (given name) =

Daw is a given name. Notable people with the name include:

- Daw Meskine, French Imam and Secretary General of the French Council for Imams
- Daw Penjo, Bhutanese diplomat
- Daw Kyan (1918–2019), Burmese historian and writer
- Daw Ohn (1913–2003), 20th-century Burmese activist, scholar, and professor

== See also ==
- Daw (disambiguation)
- Daw (surname)
