= Daou (surname) =

Daou is a surname which may refer to:

- Annabel Daou (born 1967), Lebanese contemporary artist
- Doris Daou (born 1964), Lebanese-born Canadian astronomer
- Hamadi Dhaou (born 1940), Tunisian footballer
- Hammadi Daou (born 1968), Tunisian football manager
- Oumar Daou (born 1955), Malian diplomat and political expert
- Peter Daou (born 1965), American political strategist
- Ramata Daou (born 1988), Malian-born Senegalese basketball player
- Vanessa Daou (born 1967), American singer, songwriter, poet, visual artist and dancer
- Daou al-Salhine al-Jadak (died 2011), Libyan civil war commander

== See also ==
- Daou (disambiguation)
- Hamadi Daou
- Dao (surname)
- Dau (surname)
