= Thomas Hand =

English painter

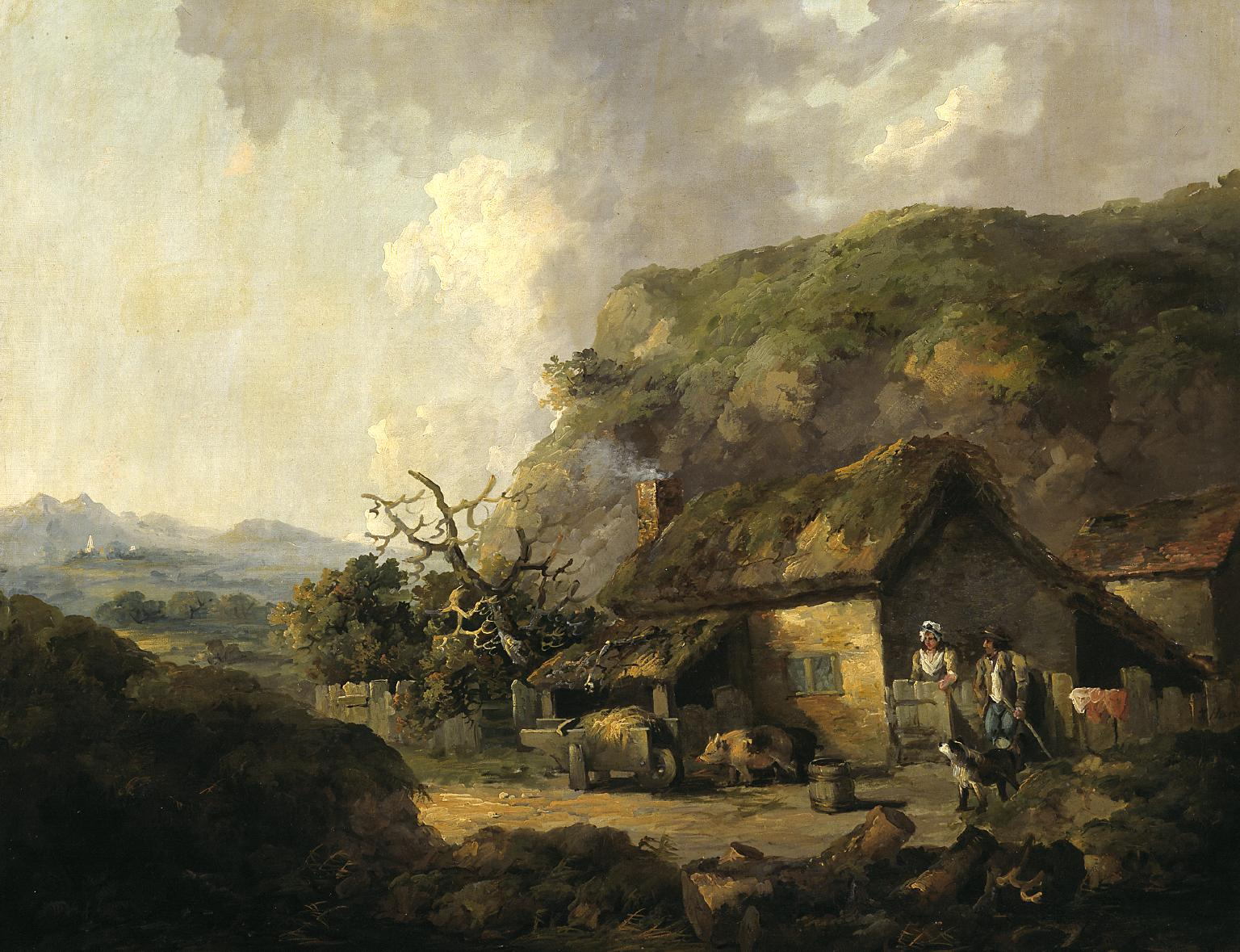
Cottage and Hilly Landscape (1797) by Thomas Hand

Thomas Hand was an English painter who was known as a follower and imitator of George Morland. He died in London in September 1804.

== Works ==
Hand exhibited a landscape with the Incorporated Society of Artists in 1790. From 1792 to 1804, he occasionally exhibited at the Royal Academy. Some of his pictures were close enough to Morland's manner to have been misattributed.

== Notes ==
Attribution

This article incorporates text from a publication now in the public domain: Stephen, Leslie; Lee, Sidney, eds. (1890). "Hand, Thomas". Dictionary of National Biography. Vol. 24. London: Smith, Elder & Co.
