= George Henry Morland =

British painter

George Henry Morland (died c. 1789) was a British genre painter.

== Life ==
Morland was born early in the eighteenth century. His art at one time was popular, and some of his works, such as The Pretty Ballad Singer and The Fair Nun Unmasked, were engraved by Watson, and The Oyster Woman by Philip Dawe. The last of these pictures is in the Glasgow Gallery and is now attributed to his son Henry Robert Morland. In 1760 he was assisted by a grant from the Incorporated Society of Artists. He lived on the south side of St. James's Square, and died in 1789 or after.

== Family ==
His son Henry Robert Morland was father of George Morland.
