= A Farrier's Shop =

Painting by George Morland

- Artist: George Morland
- Year: 1793
- Type: Oil on canvas, genre painting
- Dimensions: 71.1 cm × 91.5 cm (28.0 in × 36.0 in)
- Location: Manchester Art Gallery, Greater Manchester

A Farrier's Shop is a 1793 oil painting by the British artist George Morland. A genre painting it depicts a farrier reshoeing a white horse. Behind the farrier's shop is an inn called the Horse and Jockey. Morland was known for his scenes of everyday English rural life influenced by the tradition of the Dutch Golden Age. The painting was displayed at the Royal Academy Exhibition of 1794 held at Somerset House in London. It is now in the collection of Manchester Art Gallery having been transferred from the Manchester Institution in 1882.

== Bibliography ==
- Richardson, Ralph. George Morland, Painter, London. E. Stock, 1985.
