= Daws =

Daws may refer to:

- Daws (name)
- Daws Heath, woodland in Essex, England
- Banu Daws, one of the tribes of Arabia during Muhammad's era

== See also ==
- Daw (disambiguation)
- Dawes (disambiguation)
- RAF Daws Hill, a closed Royal Air Force base
- Daw's Castle, Watchet, Somerset, England
