= Selling Fish =

Painting by George Morland

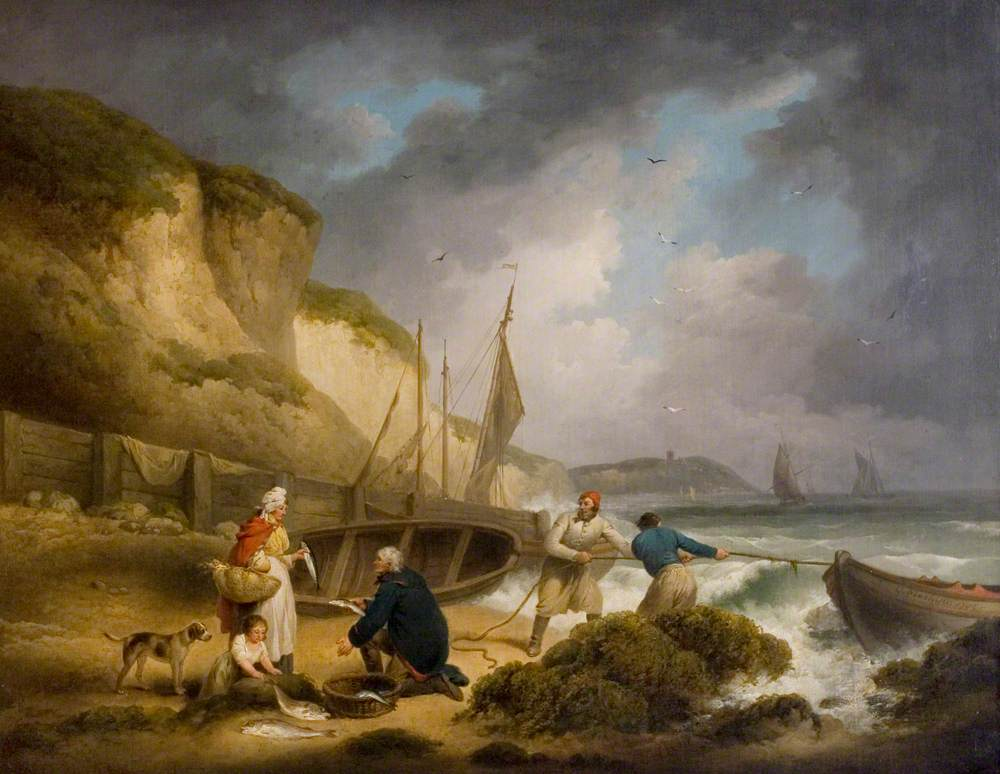
- Artist: George Morland
- Year: c.1799
- Type: Oil on canvas, genre painting
- Dimensions: 71 cm × 91.5 cm (28 in × 36.0 in)
- Location: Herbert Art Gallery, Coventry

Selling Fish is a c.1799 oil painting by the British artist George Morland. A genre painting, it depicts an English coastal scene. As a couple of fisherman haul their boat ashore another offers the fish for sale to woman on the beach. It was likely based on scenes he had drawn while staying on the Isle of Wight.

Morland became well-known for his paintings of everyday life during the late eighteenth century. This scene of the fish sale has several versions stretching back to 1793 and was also engraved by John Raphael Smith. Another different composition by the same title is in Minneapolis Institute of Art dates back to 1792.

The picture is now in the collection of the Herbert Art Gallery in Coventry, having been acquired in 1954 through the bequest of Lord Kenilworth.

== Bibliography ==
- Richardson, Ralph. George Morland, Painter, London. E. Stock, 1985.
- Roe, Sonia. Oil Paintings in Public Ownership in Warwickshire. Public Catalogue Foundation, 2009.
