= Andrew Dawes =

Andrew Dawes may refer to:

- Andrew Dawes (musician) (1940–2022), Canadian violinist
- Andrew Dawes (coach) (born 1969), Australian Paralympic wheelchair coach
- Andrew Dawes (brigadier) (fl. 1980s–2020s), British Army officer
