= Daws (name) =

Daws is a surname and may refer to:

== Surname ==
- Gavan Daws (born 1933), an author of Pacific island history and informational books
- Lenny Daws (born 1978), an English light-welterweight boxer
- Nick Daws (born 1970), an English former footballer
- Nico Daws (born 2000), an ice hockey goaltender
- Robert Daws (born 1959), an English stage and television actor
- Ron Daws (1937–1992), an American marathon athlete
- Tony Daws (born 1966), an English former footballer

== See also ==
- Daws (disambiguation)
- Dawes (surname)
- Daws Butler (1916–1988), a voice actor famous for portraying Yogi Bear and Huckleberry Hound
