= Daw =

Daw or DAW may refer to:

== People and language ==
- Daw (given name)
- Daw (surname)
- Daw, an honorific used in Burmese names
- Dâw people, an indigenous people of Brazil
- Dâw language, a language of Brazil
- Davaoeño language, ISO 939-3 language code daw, Philippines

== Places ==
- Daw, an important city, possibly modern Gebel Adda, in the medieval kingdom of Dotawo
- Daw, Mauritania
- Daw Mill, a mine in Warwickshire, England
- Daw Park, South Australia, a suburb of Adelaide
- Daw's Castle, a hill fort in Somerset, England
- An alternative spelling for the kingdom of Dô, in modern-day Mali
- Skyhaven Airport in Rochester, New Hampshire, with FAA location identifier DAW

== Organizations ==
- DAW Books, an American publisher
- German Equipment Works (Deutsche Ausrüstungswerke), an SS defense contractor
- Division for the Advancement of Women, part of UN Women

== Other uses ==
- daW, or decawatt, a unit meaning 10 watts
- Jackdaw, a bird in the crow family
- "D.A.W.", an episode of Law & Order: Criminal Intent (season 3)
- Digital audio workstation, a device for recording audio files
- DAW, "Dispense as written", an abbreviation used in medical prescriptions
- Dhow, a sailing vessel from the Indian Ocean

== See also ==
- Dawe (disambiguation)
- Daou (disambiguation)
- Daws (disambiguation)
