= Henry Robert Morland =

English painter (died 1797)

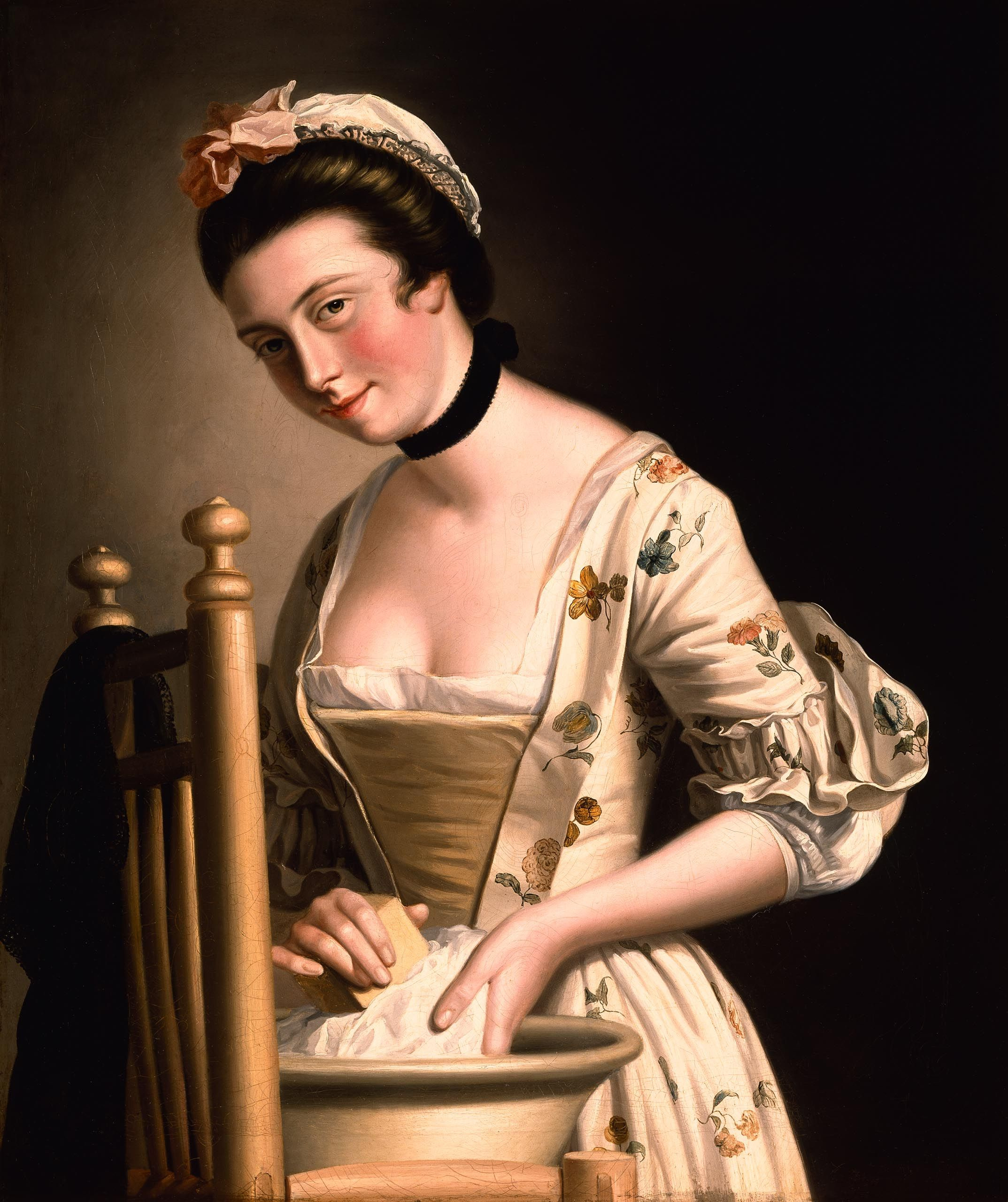
Henry Robert Morland A Woman doing Laundry

Henry Robert Morland (1716/1719 – 30 November 1797) was an English portrait painter, best remembered for a portrait of King George III, and for being the father of the animal painter George Morland.

== Life ==
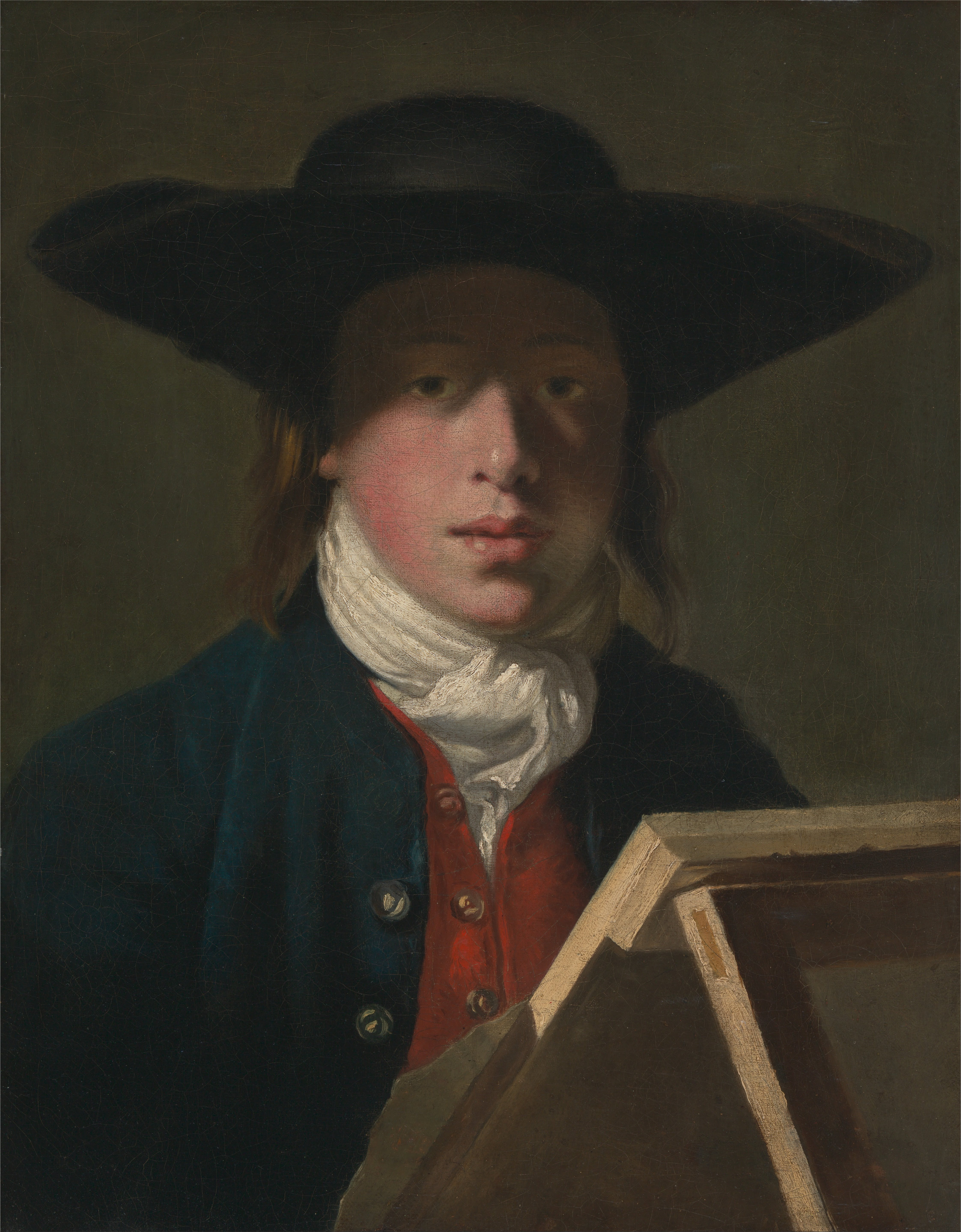
Henry Robert Morland George Morland

His father was the genre painter George Henry Morland, and Henry Robert followed an art career as well, becoming a painter of portraits and domestic subjects, in both oil and crayon.

He was at one time known as Old Morland and he was also an engraver, picture dealer and picture restorer and (per Bryan) about equally unsuccessful in each for he was always in difficulties and more than once a bankrupt. For at least one period during his early manhood he seems to have been in comfortable circumstances for he had a wide circle of influential friends and lived in the house in Leicester Square which was after occupied by Sir Joshua Reynolds.

He exhibited some 118 works from 1760 to 1791 at the Society of Artists, the Free Society, and the Royal Academy.

Morland even painted a portrait of George III, the king sitting in person.

His best known pictures, per Bryan, 1906, include the following: Lady's Maid soaping Linen 1769, engraved by Philip Dawe in the same year, the Oyster Seller, the Connoisseur and Tired Boy 1773, of which an engraving by Philip Dawe was published on November 1 of that year, Girl ironing some Sleeves 1774, the unlucky Boy tickling a Girl's Nose, a portrait of General Sir Eyre Coote 1782 a portrait of the courtesan Fanny Murray and a Woman shading a candle.

He died on 30 November 1797 at Stephen Street, Rathbone Place, London, after having led an unsettled life.

== Personal life ==
His wife Maria Morland was also an artist, and exhibited in 1785 and 1786 at the Royal Academy. Their son was the celebrated George Morland, one of the most popular painters of his day.

== Gallery ==
Selected works by Henry Robert Morland
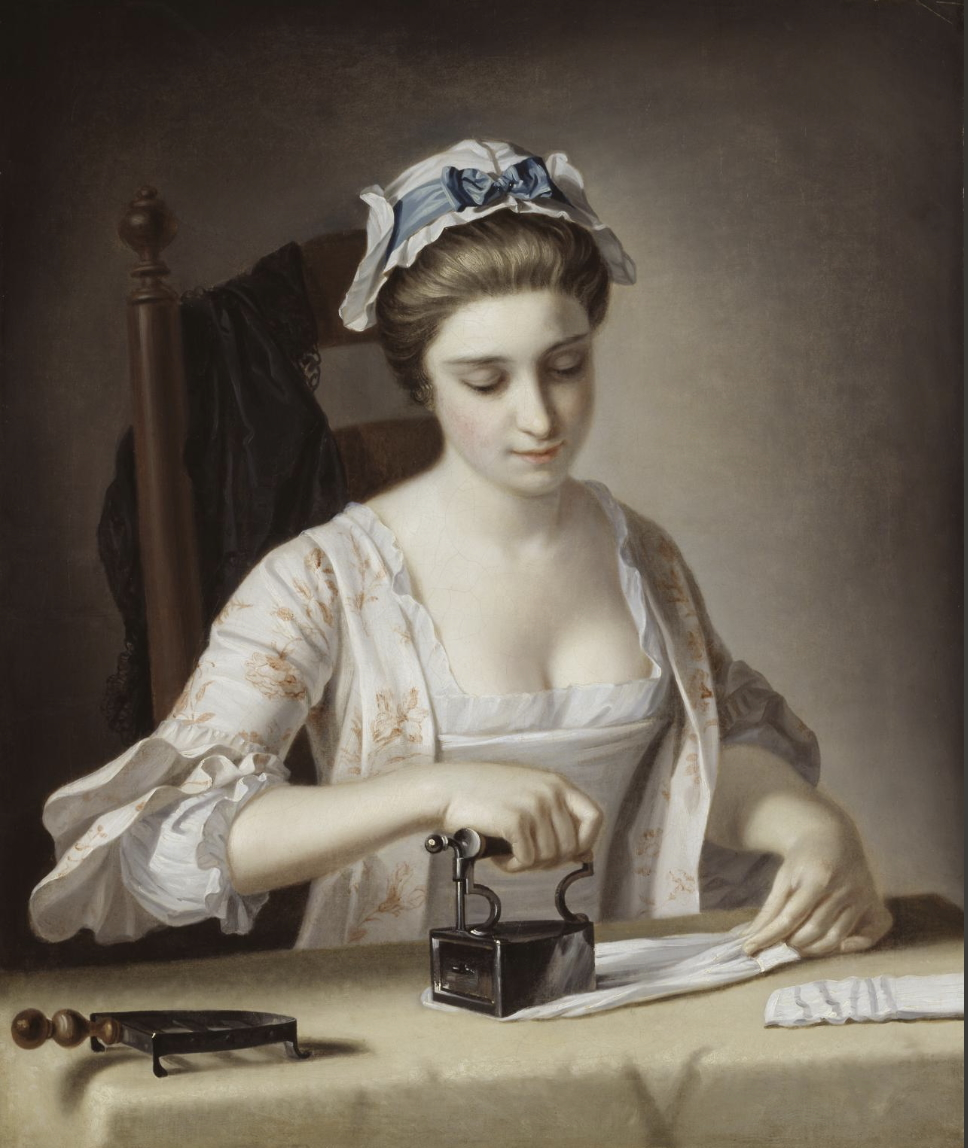
Henry Robert Morland, A Laundry Maid Ironing, Tate Britain

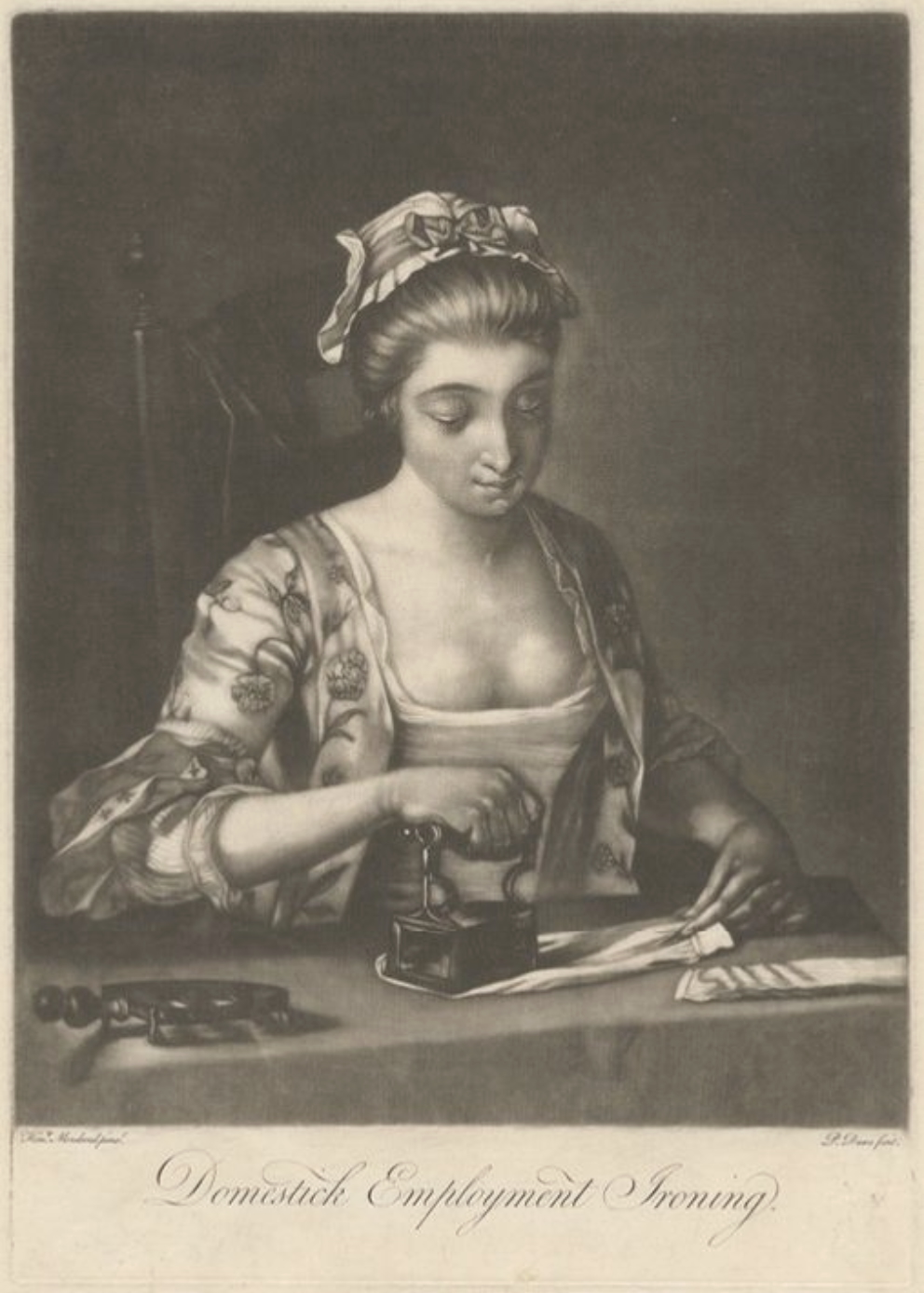
Philip Dawe after Morland, Domestick Employment Ironing, ca. 1769 Yale Center for British Art

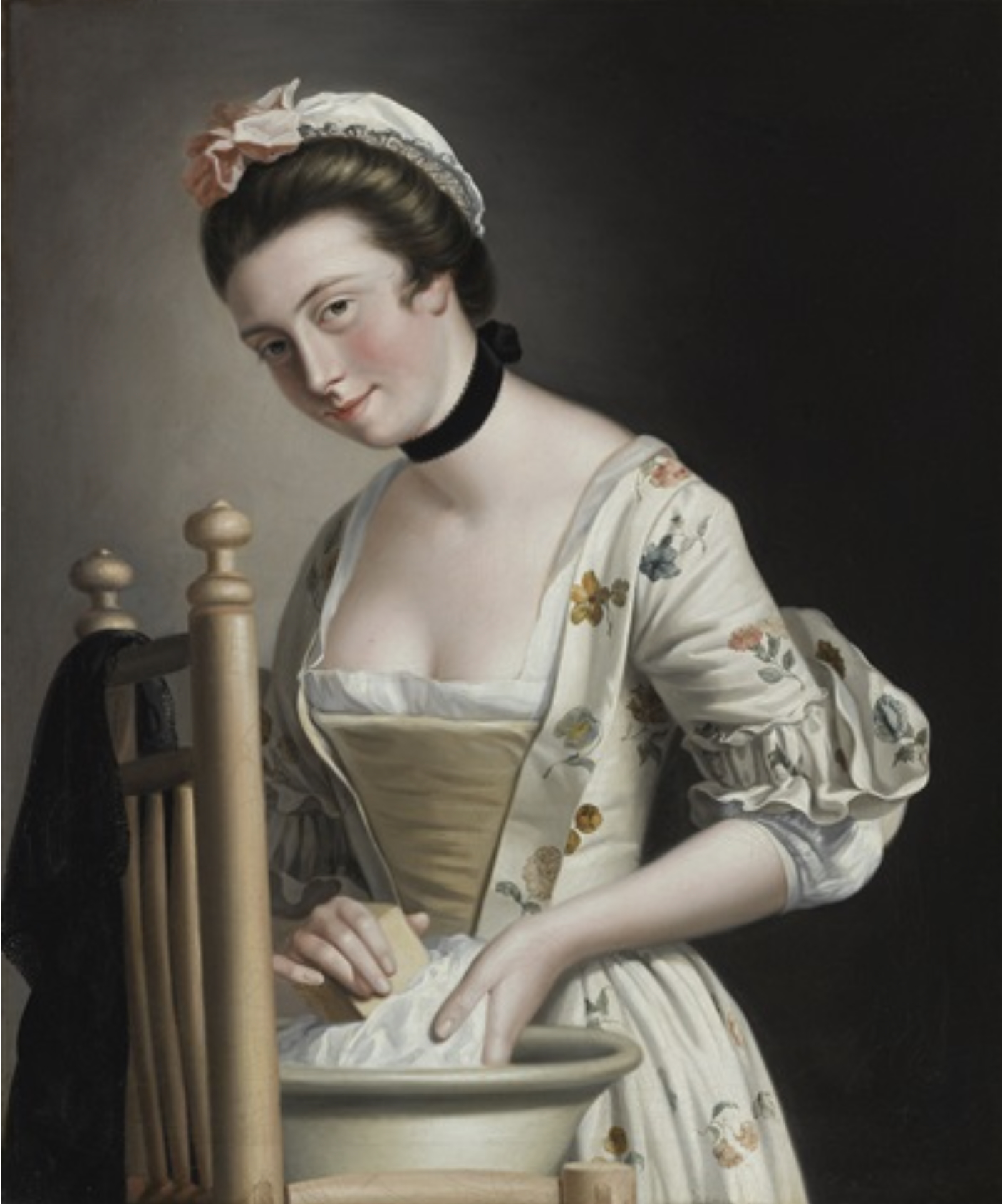
Henry Robert Morland, Lady's Maid Soaping Linen, Private Collection

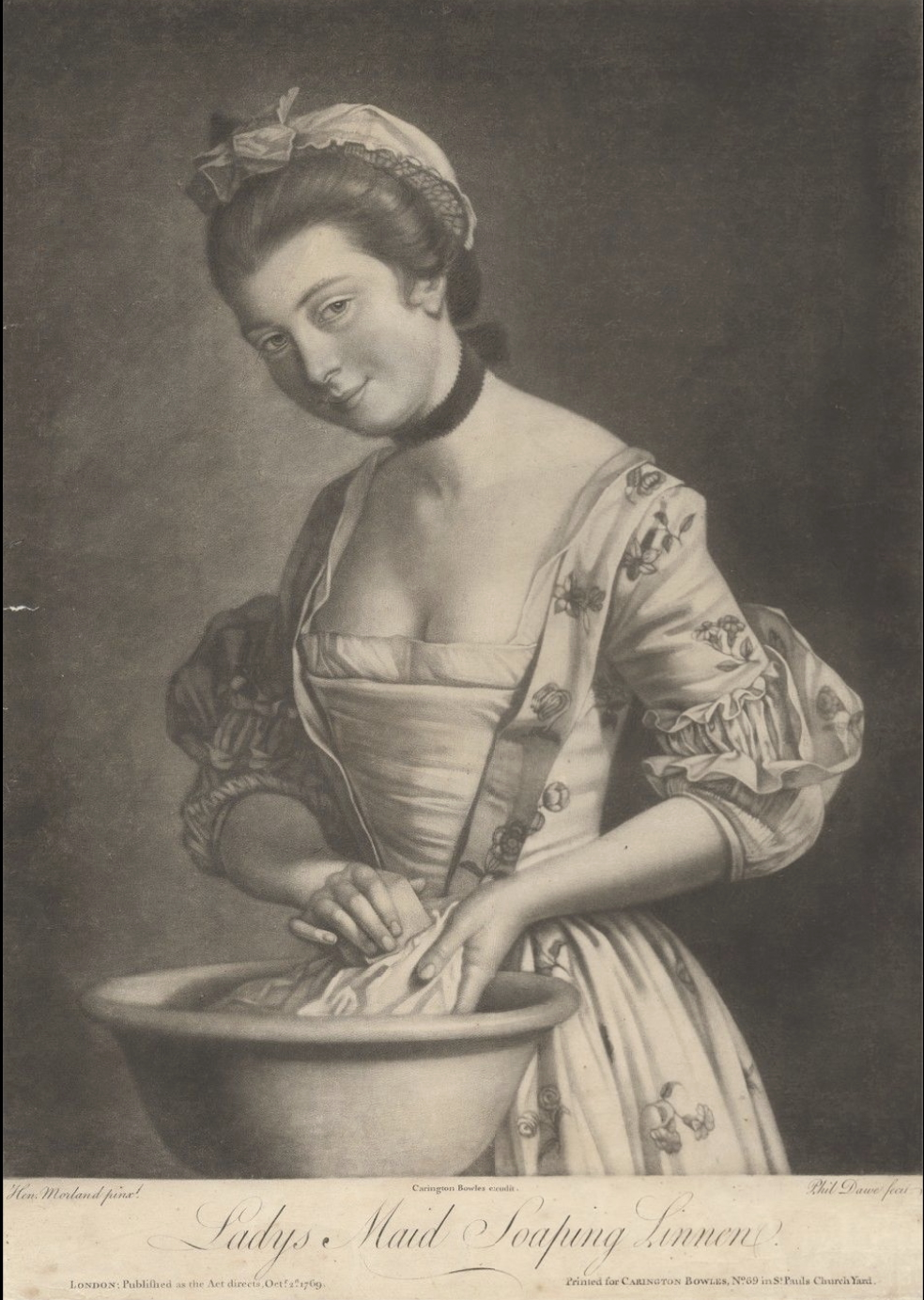
Philip Dawe after Morland, Domestick Employment Lady's Maid Soaping Linen, 1769 Yale Center for British Art

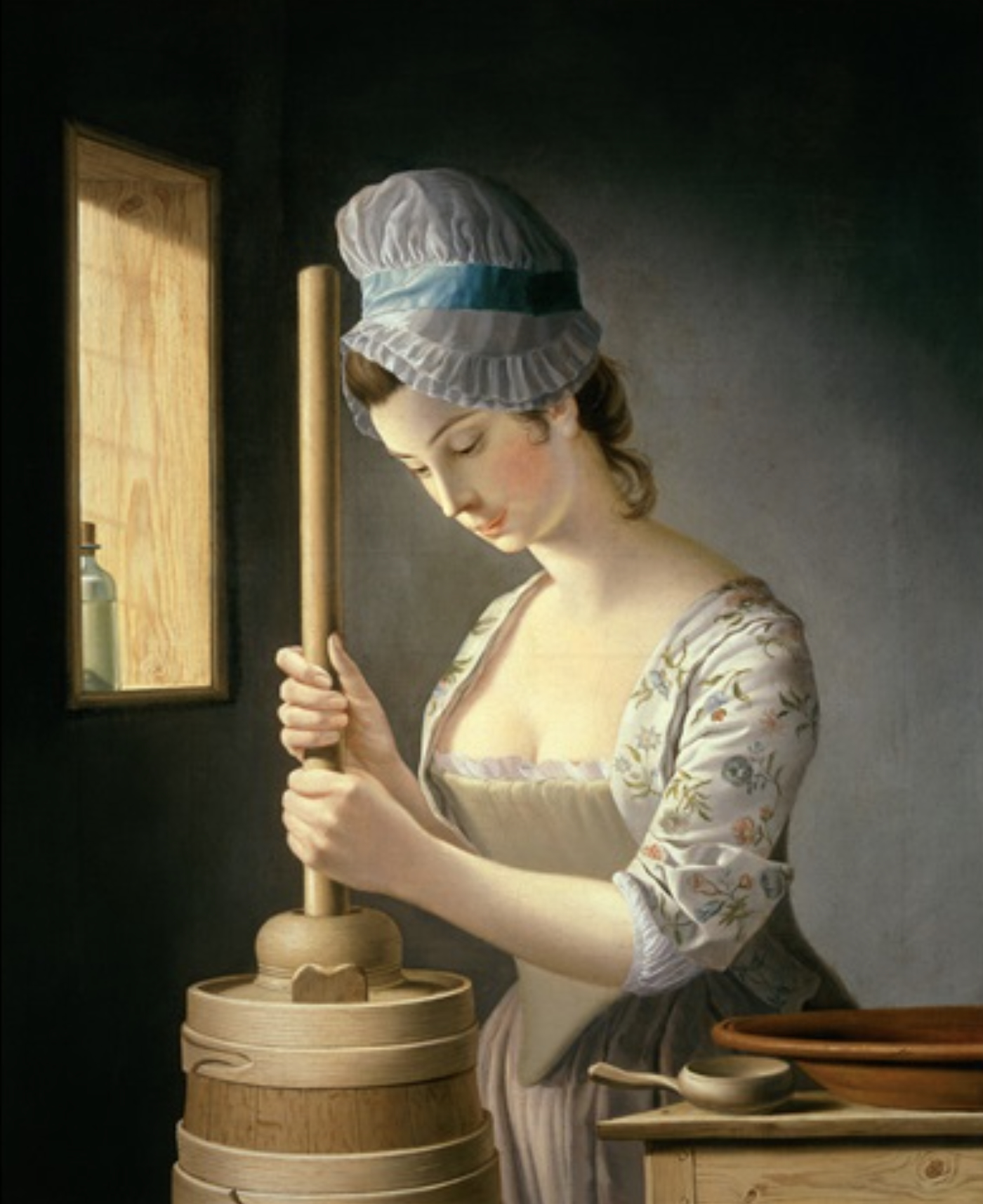
Henry Robert Morland, Domestick Employment, The Butter Churner, Private Collection

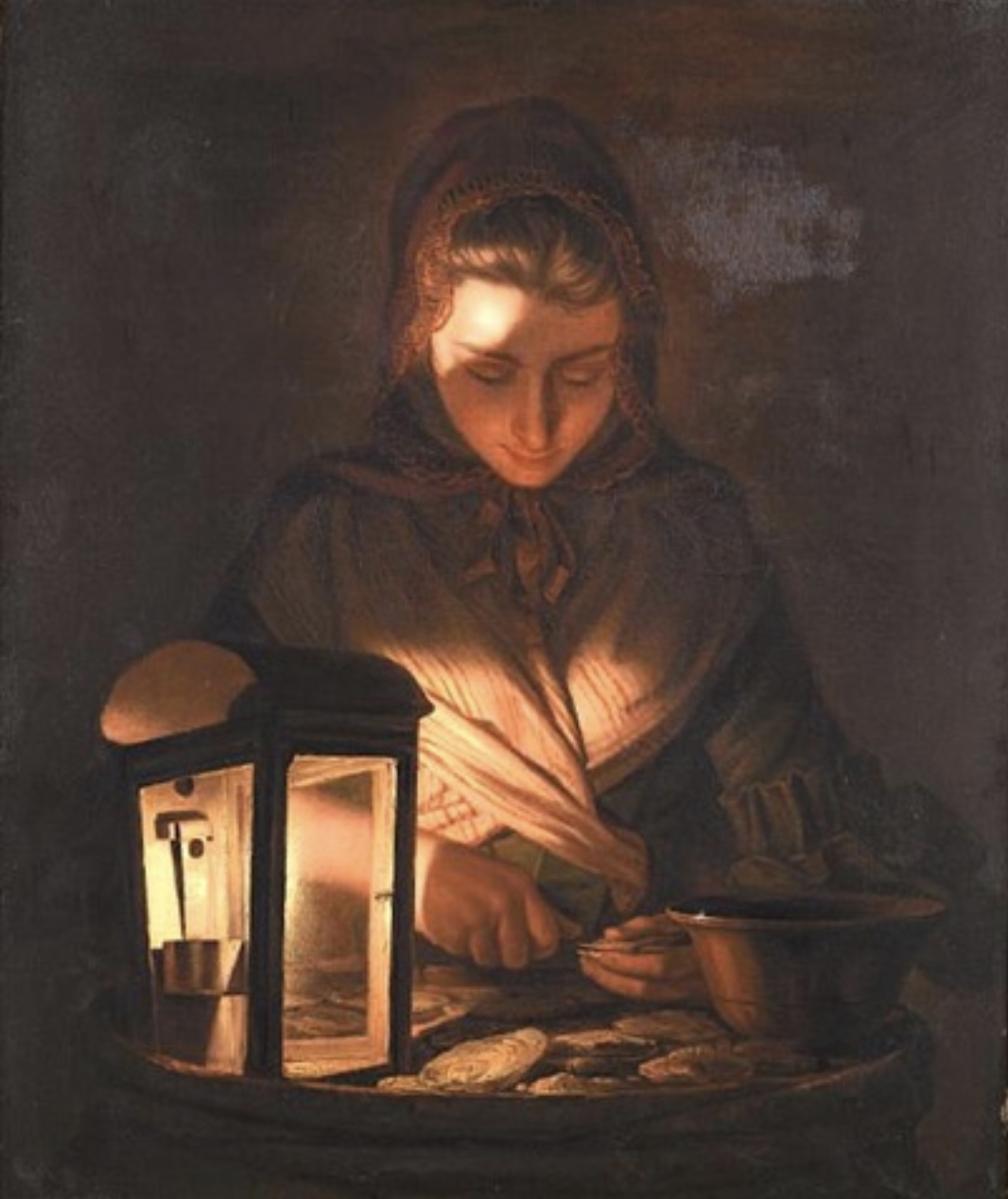
Henry Robert Morland, A young woman shucking oysters by lamplight, Private Collection

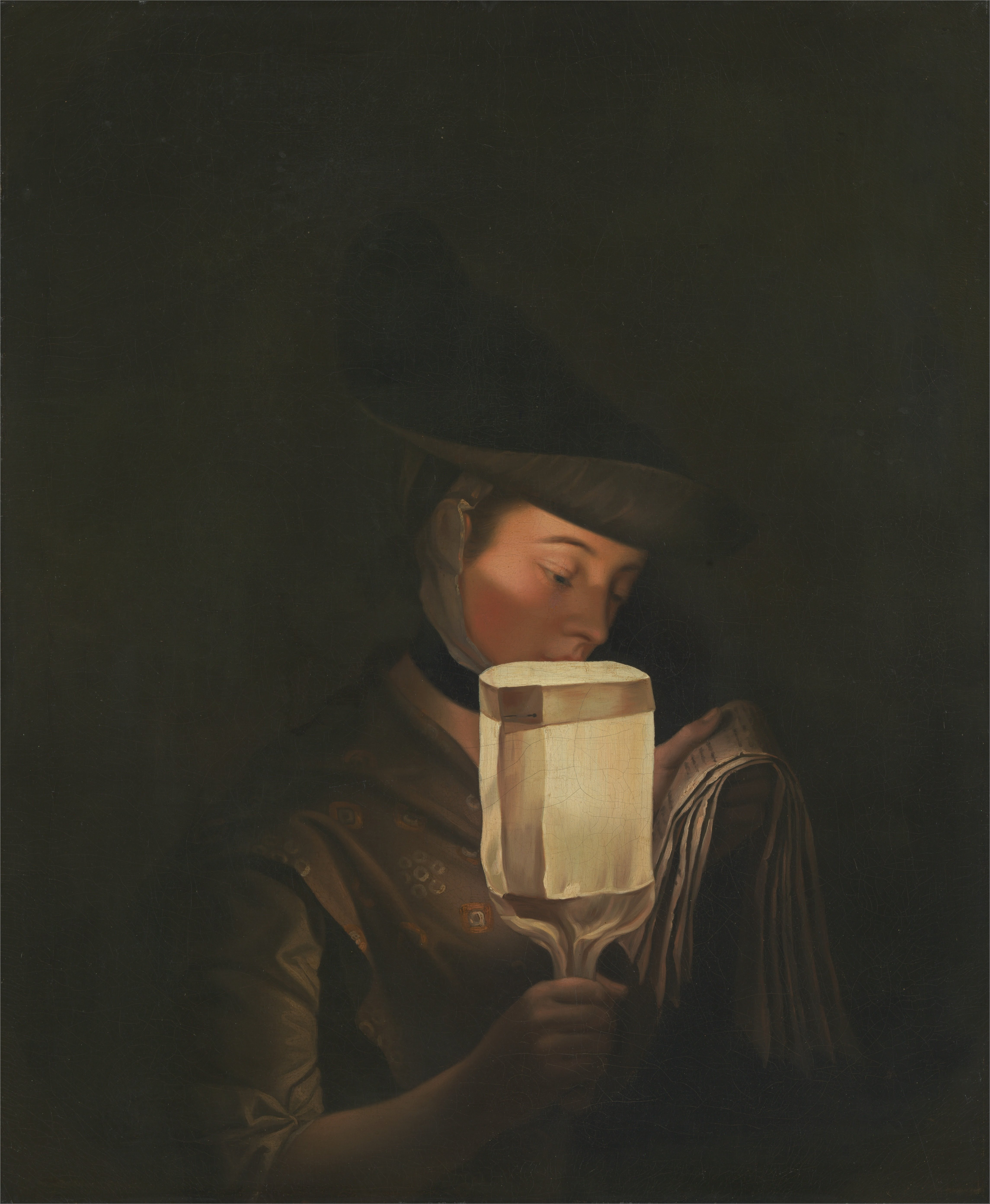
Henry Robert Morland - The Ballad Singer - Yale Center for British Art

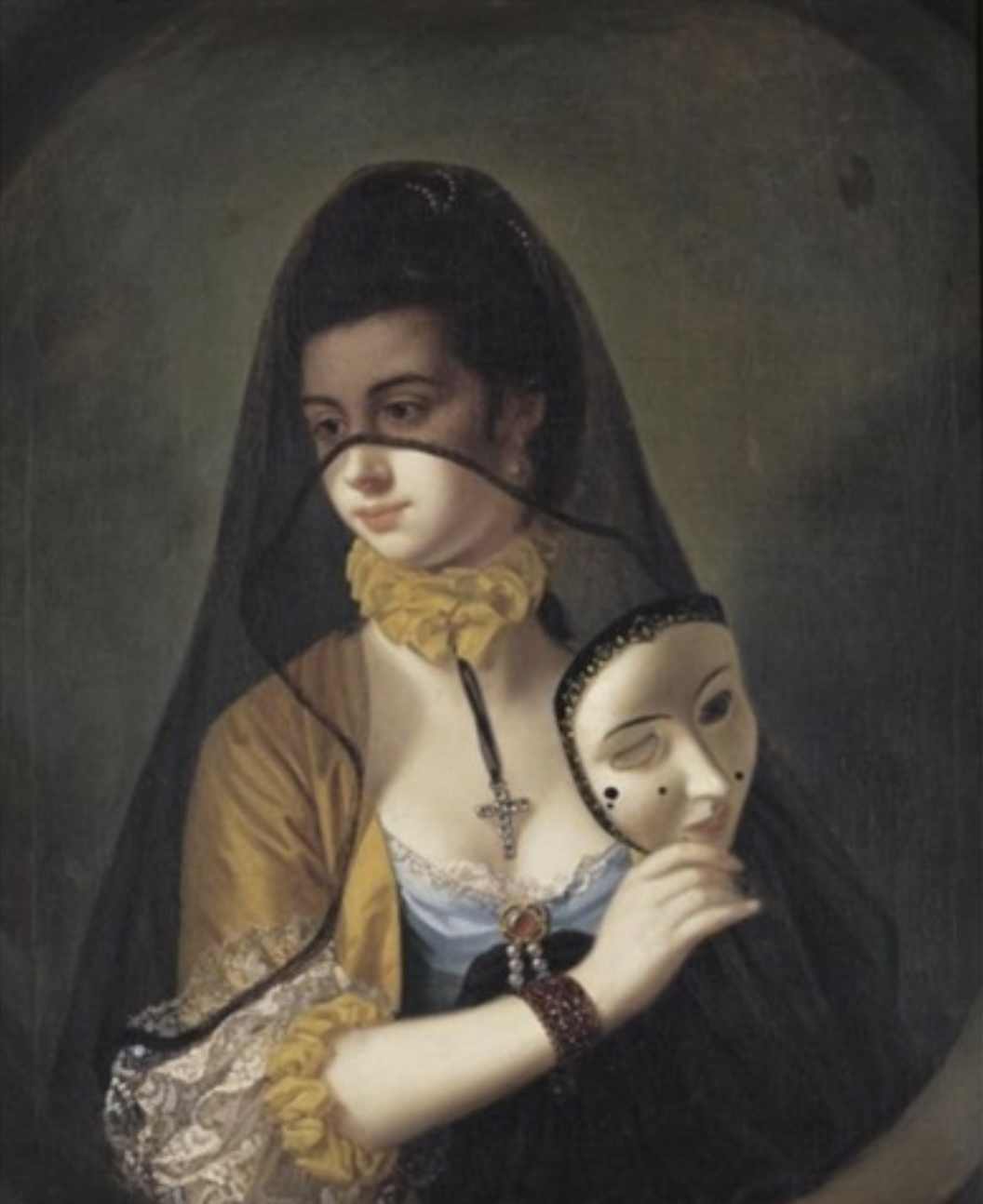
Henry Robert Morland, The fair nun unmasked, Private Collection

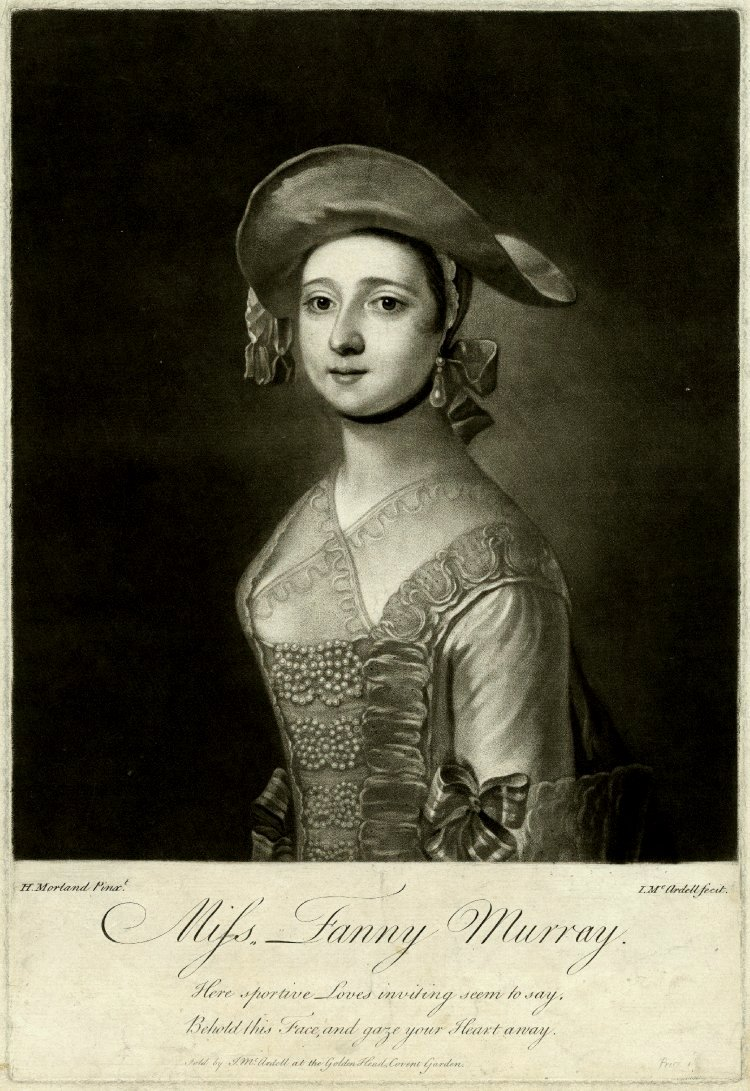
Miss Fanny Murray after Henry Robert Morland. The inscription reads "Here sportive Loves inviting seem to say, / Behold this Face, and gaze your Heart away"
