= Christopher Dawes =

Christopher Dawes may refer to:

- Christopher Dawes (author) (born 1961), British journalist and author
- Chris Dawes (Jamaican footballer) (born 1974), retired Jamaican footballer
- Chris Dawes (Australian footballer) (born 1988), Australian rules footballer

== See also ==
- Dawes (surname)
