= Andrew Dawes (brigadier) =

British Army officer

- Military career
- Allegiance: United Kingdom
- Branch: British Army
- Rank: Brigadier
- Commands: Military commander for Wales, Commander of 160th Welsh Brigade, head of army in Wales. Commander South West for The British Army (–2020)
- Awards: CBE

Brigadier Andrew Dawes CBE is a senior British Army officer, serving as Military commander for Wales, commander of the 160th Welsh Brigade and head of the British army in Wales.

== Career ==
Dawes "attended Oswestry School between the years of 1983 and 1986 before he left to attend the University of Lancaster". Before becoming commander for Wales, he was the military commander for South West England until 2020. He was awarded a CBE in 2020, partly due to his leadership in the military support during the poisoning of Sergei and Yulia Skripal in Salisbury, England.

=== Exercise Cambrian Patrol ===
Discussing the Exercise Cambrian Patrol, Dawes stated that he is "thrilled the exercise is back" and:

"The format remains focused on the battle craft syllabus to an annual training test standard," he said.

"One may think this sounds simple, but you would be quite wrong."

=== Support of NHS in Wales during the Covid Pandemic ===
The Welsh Ambulance Service thanked the Armed Forces in Wales for its support through the Coronavirus pandemic. On the 12th of May 2021, the Welsh Ambulance Trust presented a plaque to Dawes CBE as a token of its appreciation.

=== Support of Welsh Barracks ===
In response to the announcement in 2021 that Cawdor Barracks in Pembrokeshire will not be closed until 2028 and that the revamped Caerwent Barracks will house the Welsh Cavalry from 2028, Dawes said “We will welcome the Welsh Cavalry and an additional infantry unit to a new, purpose-built barracks in South Wales as well as a new sub-unit of 3 Royal Welsh in Wrexham. These adjustments strengthen our presence across Wales and underlines the importance of Wales to the Army and to the wider UK”.
