= Jason Dawe =

Jason Dawe may refer to:

- Jason Dawe (presenter), motoring journalist and television show host
- Jason Dawe (ice hockey) (born 1973), professional ice hockey player in the National Hockey League
