= Daw Meskine =

Daw Meskine is a French Imam and Secretary General of the French Council for Imams.

== Life as Imam ==
Daw Meskine is the imam of the Clichy-Sous-Bois mosque and the secretary general of the French Council of Imams.

=== Career ===
Meskine has been treated as an important figure in Franco-Islamic relations and interior minister Nicolas Sarkozy who has apparently consulted him in the past.

=== Arrest and controversy ===
On June 19, 2006 it was announced Imam Meskine and his son were arrested for laundering money linked to a terrorist organization. Many members of the French Islamic community saw the arrest as a provocation meant to interfere with state funding to the al-Najah Muslim High school. Some have linked the event to his criticism of the policies of Nicolas Sarkozy.

17 other French citizens have been arrested in the operation.

== Sources ==
- Islam Online article before scandal
- Islam Online article after arrest
- American blog where the arrest was discussed
- Fox news story on June, 20, 2006
- Expatica article on the raids
