= Annabel Daou =

Lebanese contemporary artist

Annabel Daou (born 1967) is a Lebanese contemporary artist. Her art practice includes sculpture, performance and drawing, often with the additional influences of writing and literature.

In April 2020, at the beginning of the 2020 Covid pandemic, Daou staged the work I will worry for you (from dusk till dawn). In the piece, she took over the burden of worrying about the particular issues facing her audience, based on emailed suggestions.

Daou has exhibited at the National Museum of Beirut, the KW Institute for Contemporary Art, Berlin, and Park Avenue Armory, New York.

Her work is included in the collections of the Brooklyn Museum and the Columbus Museum, Georgia.
