= Julian Dawes =

English composer

Julian Dawes (born 1942) is an English composer. He is a member of the British Academy of Composers and Songwriters.

Dawes has written a number of sonatas and suites for a variety of combinations of instruments, as well as eleven song-cycles including two concerned with the Holocaust, Songs of Ashes, and I Never Saw Another Butterfly. Songs of Ashes has been broadcast three times in Israel.

In March 2003 his cantata The Death of Moses for Narrator, Chorus and Chamber Ensemble, and in June 2005 his Oratorio on the biblical Book of Ruth, were premiered in London by the Alyth Choral Society and Chamber Ensemble.

Dawes is music advisor to the European Association of Jewish Culture.
