= Dawe Serara =

- District
- Country: Ethiopia

Dawe Serara is a district of Oromia Region in Ethiopia.

== See also ==
- Districts of Ethiopia
