= Daw (surname) =

Daw is a surname. It may refer to:

Darren Daw (born 1964) UK Construction Director

- Anne Daw, South Australian campaigner for the protection of water resources and arable land from invasive mining activities
- Carl P. Daw Jr. (born 1944), American religious leader
- Chris Daw (born 1970), Canadian Paralympian in multiple sports
- Evelyn Daw (actress) (1912–1970), American actress and singer
- Jeff Daw (born 1972), Canadian hockey player
- John Daw (1870–1965), American Navajo military scout
- Kinkar Daw (born 1940), Indian cricketer
- Leila Daw (born 1940), American artist
- Majak Daw (born 1991), Australian footballer
- Marjorie Daw (actress), stage name of American silent film actress Margaret House (1902–1979)

== Fictional characters ==
- the title character of "Marjorie Daw" (short story), by Thomas Bailey Aldrich

== See also ==
- Dawe (surname)
- Daw (given name)
