= Marylou Dawes =

Canadian musician

- Born: June 14, 1933; Calgary, Alberta, Canada
- Died: October 22, 2013 (aged 80) Unity, Saskatchewan, Canada
- Genres: Classical
- Occupations: musician; music teacher; lecturist
- Instruments: Piano, harpsichord

Marylou Dawes (June 14, 1933 – October 22, 2013) or Mary Lou Dawes, was a Canadian concert pianist. She was one of Canada's leading accompanists, chamber musicians and soloists. She trained in Calgary and Austria and won the 3rd prize at the ARD International Music Competition, Munich, for duo with her brother Andrew Dawes in 1963. Marylou and Andrew played a concert for Queen Elizabeth II and The Duke of Edinburgh during their Royal visit to Regina in July 1973. She has toured across Canada, Europe, Mexico and the United States.

Her interpretation of contemporary music has won her acclaim from such composers as John Weinzweig, Clermont Pépin, and Murray Adaskin. She has premiered works by Oskar Morawetz, Talivaldis Kenins, Richard Payne, and Victor Davies. After many years of studying and performing the chamber works of Beethoven written for piano and various instruments she had time to explore his vast repertoire for solo piano.

== Biography ==
Marylou Dawes was born in Calgary, Alberta, Canada, She was a pianist, harpsichordist, chamber musician, soloist, teacher, adjudicator and examiner studied under Dorothy Hare, Terrance Fullerton and Joan Shaw in Calgary, Prof. John Wustman of the University of Illinois, Prof. Lorand Fenyves of the University of Toronto and graduated with distinction from the Vienna Academy of Music in Vienna, Austria.

She was a faculty member of the University of Saskatchewan both in Saskatoon and Regina, and was co-founder of the Saskatoon Chamber Orchestra and "music at the Mendel". Dawes was a regular performer on CBC Radio; her performances have been described as "sterling" by Deryk Barker of the Victoria Times Colonist, "An accomplished pianist—Mozart playing of the highest level." Calgary Herald, "Tone production crisp and vigorous without ever becoming hard or rough—tremendous verver and controlled energy." Toronto Globe and Mail, "Effortless technique, graceful phrasing and subtle varied tone—projects musical ideas with power and eloquence." Montreal Star. The Saskatoon Star Phoenix interviewed and photographed Miss Dawes on several occasions. As well, Chatelaine Magazine did a feature on Marylou during their "Women of Canada" centennial series in 1967. She represented Saskatchewan in that feature.

== Personal life ==
She was married from 1960 to 1974, and had three children. Although she had several relationships, her music career made it difficult to maintain them. She had a close friendship with artist Lorraine Malach and the two urged each other on in their perspective artistic careers. In later life Marylou spent time travelling around the world, enjoyed camping and outdoors right up to her death. She died on October 22, 2013. She had warm relationships with her children, had many close friends and was an integral force in music and arts in the province she called home, Saskatchewan.

== Recordings ==
Dawes made many recordings from the 1950s to 2011, many on vinyl and recorded for CBC Radio. Listed are more recent recordings.

- Festival music for trumpet 1980
- Things the clouds tell me 1981
- Sonata for violin and piano January 6, 2000
- Beethoven Sonata op.27 2007
- The Kabalevsky Preludes 2011
