= Henry Dawe =

English painter (1790–1848)

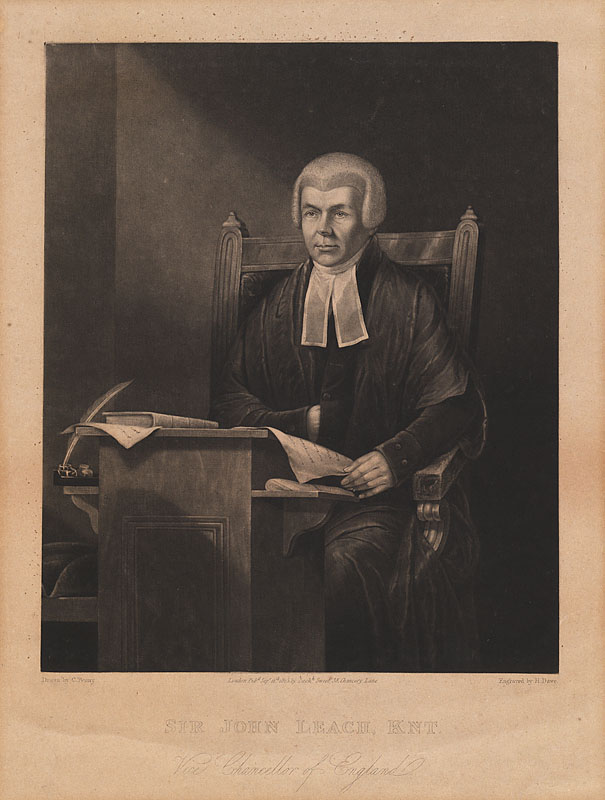
Judge John Leach, engraving from 1825 after a painting by Charles Penny

Henry Edward Dawe (1790–1848) was an English engraver and subject painter, the brother of the artist George Dawe.

== Life ==
Dawe was born at Kentish Town, near London, in 1790. He was taught by his father, Philip Dawe, the engraver, and he also studied in the schools of the Royal Academy. He assisted Turner on his Liber Studiorum, and mezzotinted many of his brother's portraits. As a painter, he exhibited at the Society of British Artists, of which he was elected a member in 1830. He died at Windsor in 1848.

== Sources ==
- Bird, Henry (2004). "Dawe, Henry Edward". Oxford Dictionary of National Biography.
