= Hamadi Daou =

Hamadi Daou may refer to:

- Hamadi Dhaou (born 1940), Tunisian footballer
- Hammadi Daou (born 1968), Tunisian football manager
