= Daw Penjo =

Bhutanese diplomat

Lyonpo Daw Penjo is the Permanent Representative (or ambassador) of the Kingdom of Bhutan to the United Nations. He presented his credentials to the Secretary-General of the United Nations on 26 November 2003.

He is also the first Ambassador of the Kingdom of Bhutan to Canada, and presented his credentials to the Governor General of Canada at Rideau Hall in November 2004.

Daw Penjo was a vice-president of the UN Economic and Social Council (ECOSOC) in 2004.

He was one of the speakers at the UN's tribute to the memory of Pope John Paul II during the 59th General Assembly, with his quote describing the late Pope as "... the spiritual leader of the Catholic Church, but always a true leader for all, who had devoted his life to the cause of peace, harmony and justice" being repeated frequently on news programs.
