= Robert Dawe =

Robert Dawe may refer to:

- Norman Dawe (Robert Norman Dawe, 1898–1948), Canadian sports executive
- Robert Shayne (Robert Shaen Dawe, 1900–1992), American actor
