= Richard Dawes =

Richard Dawes may refer to:

- Richard Dawes (classical scholar) (1708–1766), English classical scholar
- Richard Dawes (educationalist) (1793–1867), English cleric and educationalist
- Richard Jeffries Dawes (1897–1983), Canadian World War I flying ace
