= Johnny Dawes (actor) =

American actor and model (1955–1989)

- Born: Brian Lee; February 22, 1955; Akron, Summit County, Ohio, U.S.
- Died: July 25, 1989 (aged 34); Los Angeles, California, U.S.
- Occupations: Actor; model; filmmaker
- Years active: 1973–1989
- Agent: Falcon Studios

Johnny Dawes (March 22, 1955 – July 25, 1989), born Brian Lee, was an American adult film actor, model, and writer. Active during the 1970s and 1980s, Dawes appeared primarily in gay pornography. Beyond adult film, he worked as a stage actor, photographer, and classical music contributor.

== Early life and education ==
Dawes was born Brian Lee in Akron, Ohio, one of five children. He attended local schools and graduated from high school in 1971. Following graduation, he moved to Los Angeles, California, to pursue work in film and performance.

== Career ==
=== Adult film and modeling ===
In 1973, Lee began working as a dancer in an all-male erotic revue at the Beverly Cinema in Los Angeles. He entered the adult film industry in 1974 under the stage name Johnny Dawes. Over the next decade, he became a contract actor for studios including Falcon Studios. He modeled for various gay magazines and erotica publications throughout the late 1970s and 1980s.

In 1983, Dawes starred as Steve in the adult feature Pleasure Beach, directed by Arthur J. Bressan Jr. For his role in the film, Dawes won the Best Actor award at the 1984 Gay Producers Association (GPA) Awards.

Dawes retired from the adult film industry in 1986 but he returned to film work briefly in early 1989 to complete a final group of projects.

=== Theater and scholarly Work ===
Outside of pornography, Dawes worked in the Los Angeles arts and theater community. In 1985, he starred as Richard, the male lead, in the Los Angeles production of Night Sweats at the Fifth Estate Theatre. Written by playwright Robert Chesley, it was one of the earliest theatrical productions to address the AIDS epidemic.

Dawes was also a portrait photographer and classical music enthusiast. He worked as an opera historian, contributing biographical articles to Opera Digest, including a study of the American lyric soprano Alma Gluck. Prior to his death, he was researching a full-length biography of Gluck. He also directed a documentary film titled A Dance with Death and filmed a minor role as a Russian spy in a non-adult feature film.

== Death ==
Dawes began experiencing health issues in December 1988. He was diagnosed with AIDS on June 16, 1989. He died from complications of the disease on July 25, 1989, at Cedars-Sinai Medical Center in Los Angeles and he was 34 years old.

== Filmography ==
=== Film ===
Year	Title	Role	Notes
1978	F Truck	Johnny	Also known as Dirt Bikes
1979	Bad, Bad Boys	B.J.	Also known as Bad Boys
1982	Skin Deep	Johnny Daws	Emerson Films
1983	Games	Bob Parker	Surge Studio
1983	To Catch a Thief	Thief	J.R. Productions
1983	Valley Boys	Boy	Rollo Productions
1983	The Wilde House	Blonde	Rollo Productions
1983	Doing It	Hustler	TCS Studio
1983	The Private Pleasures of John Holmes	Eric	H.A.G. Productions
1983	Revenge of the Nighthawk in Leather	Toby	Cosco Studio
1983	Pleasure Beach	Steve	VCA Pictures
1983	Knockout!	Bobby	Pan Pacific Pictures
1984	Trick Time	John	Cosco Studio
1984	Daddy Dearest	Bob	Argos Film
1984	Hot Stuff	Handsome Teenager	
1986	Soap Studs	Marathon	
1986	Big Boys of Summer	Swimmer	SurfSide 7 Productions
1988	A Big Business	Office Worker	10/9 Productions
1988	Dude Ranch	Ranch Hand	Panther Productions
1988	Boys Night Out!	Sexy Boy	10/9 Productions
1988	Hard Line	Matt	10/9 Productions
1988	Who's Dat Boy	Alan	10/9 Productions
1989	Tasting Mr. Goodbar	Brad	Venus Video
1989	In the End Zone	Leon	Stallion Video
1989	3-Way Cum, Volume 1	Jon	Rawhide Video
1989	Best of Cum 1	Teenager Boy	Rawhide Video
1990	Bottom Boys (Hot Shots 31)	Boy	HIS Video
1995	It's Great Outdoors	Nick	Le Salon Video
1996	Lets Swap Meat	Blonde	Also known as Hot Pages: Bound for Lust
1997	Prized Pieces	Johnny	HIS Video
1997	Bare Boners	Johnny	HIS Video
2021	Falcon Icons: The 1970s	Johnny Dawes	Falcon Studios
2024	Custom Cock Commandos	Johnny Dawes	Posthumous release
2025	Daddy Dearest & Juice	Johnny Dawes	Posthumous release

== Awards and nominations ==
Name of the award ceremony, year presented, category, nominee of the award, and the result of the nomination
Award ceremony	Year	Category	Nominee / Work	Result	Ref.
Gay Erotic Video Awards	1984	Best Actor	Pleasure Beach	Won	

== Notes ==
- Douglas, Jerry (1990). Manshots Vol. 2 No. 4 (Fade Out: Johnny Dawes Obituary). FirstHand, Ltd. OCLC 30846924.
