= William Ward (engraver) =

English engraver

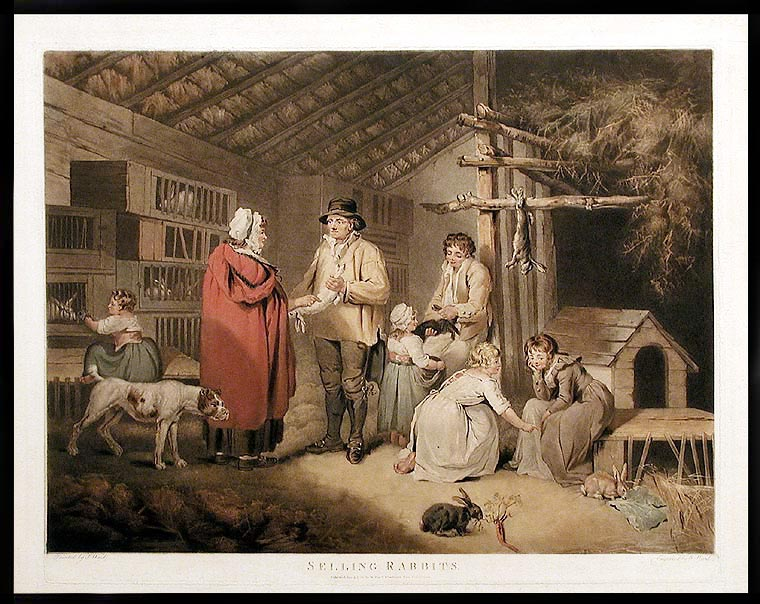
Selling Rabbits (1796)

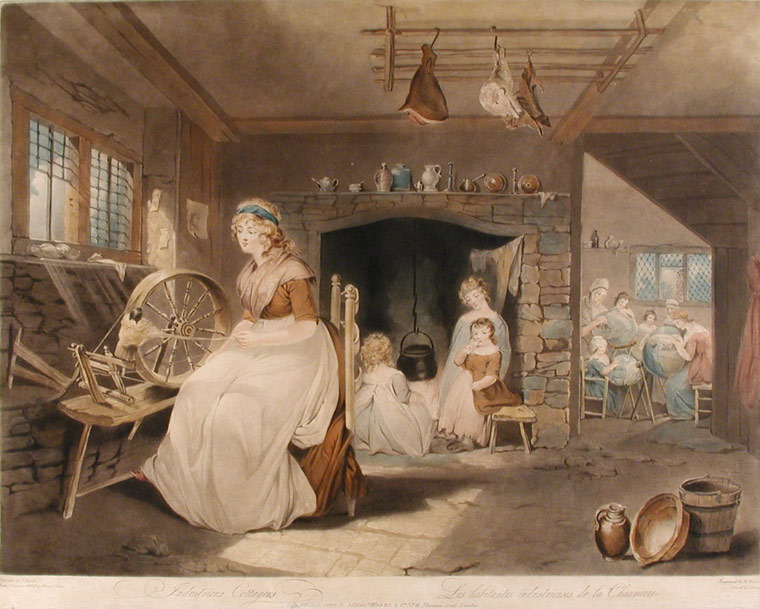
Industrious Cottagers (1801)

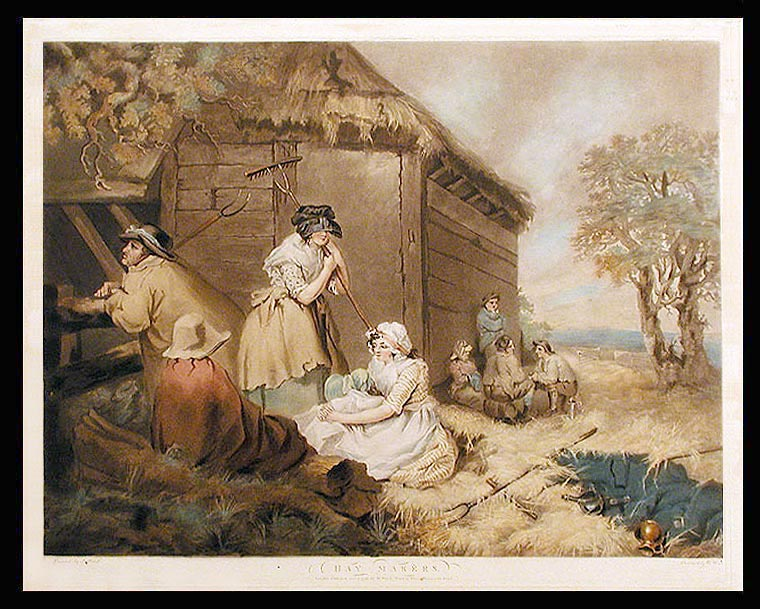
Hay Makers (1793)

William Ward, ARA (1766–1826) was an English engraver.

== Life ==
One of the five children of James and Rachael (née Goldsmith) Ward, and the elder brother of James Ward, William Ward was appointed engraver to the Duke of York, the Prince of Wales, and associate engraver to the Royal Academy.

William Ward's brother James was one of the outstanding artists of the day, his singular style and great skill set him above most of his contemporaries, markedly influencing the growth of British art. Regarded as one of the great animal painters of his time, James produced history paintings, portraits, landscapes and genre. He started off as an engraver, trained by William, who later engraved much of his work. The partnership of William and James Ward produced the best that English art had to offer, their great technical skill and artistry having led to images that reflect the grace and charm of the era.

== Family ==
He was married to Maria Morland, sister of George Morland. The couple had two children: Martin Theodore Ward (died 1874) and William James Ward (died 1840).
