= Daou =

Daou may refer to:

- Daou (surname), a surname
- Daou Technology Inc., a South Korean communication technology company
- Stade Amari Daou, multi-use stadium in Ségou, Mali
- The Daou, a New York-based dance music quintet

== See also ==
- Daouk (disambiguation)
- Daw (disambiguation)
- Dawe (disambiguation)
