= Philip Dawe =

English engraver (c. 1730 – 1832)

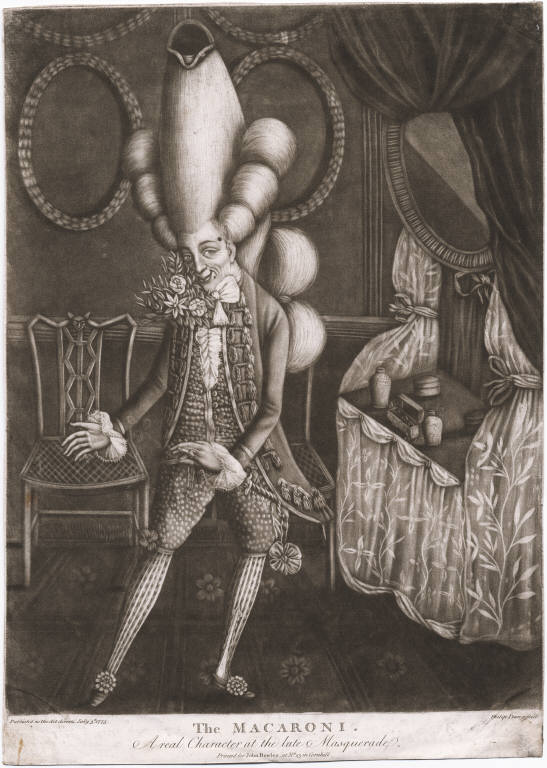
"The Macaroni. A real Character at the late Masquerade", mezzotint by Philip Dawe, 1773

Philip Dawe (c. 1730 – 13 August 1832) was an English mezzotint engraver, artist and political cartoonist. He is thought to have been born in London in the 1730s, the son of a city merchant. He died in Kentish Town, London. He was married to Jane and they had six children, three of whom also became artists: George Dawe, Henry Edward Dawe and James Philip Dawe.

He was apprenticed with Henry Morland and godfather to his son George Morland. It is said that Dawe was the only person to maintain a strong friendship with George Morland through both the ups and downs of the latter's life. Dawe's son, George, wrote a biography of Morland entitled The Life of George Morland with Remarks on His Works which was published in 1807.

Philip Dawe also worked for some time under William Hogarth. Although he worked as an artist in his own right, Dawe's output largely comprised engravings of the work of others.

He also produced satirical political cartoons leading up to the events of the Boston Tea Party and is referred to in a book entitled The Boston Port Bill as Pictured by a Contemporary London Cartoonist by R.T.H. Halsey. These cartoons include "The Bostonians in Distress," "The Alternative of Williams-Burg," and "The Butcher’s Wife Dressing for the Pantheon." They were of a simple style but made acute observation and comment. In 1774, he produced his most well known work, "Bostonians Paying the Excise-Man, or Tarring and Feathering."
