= George Morland =

English painter (1763–1804)

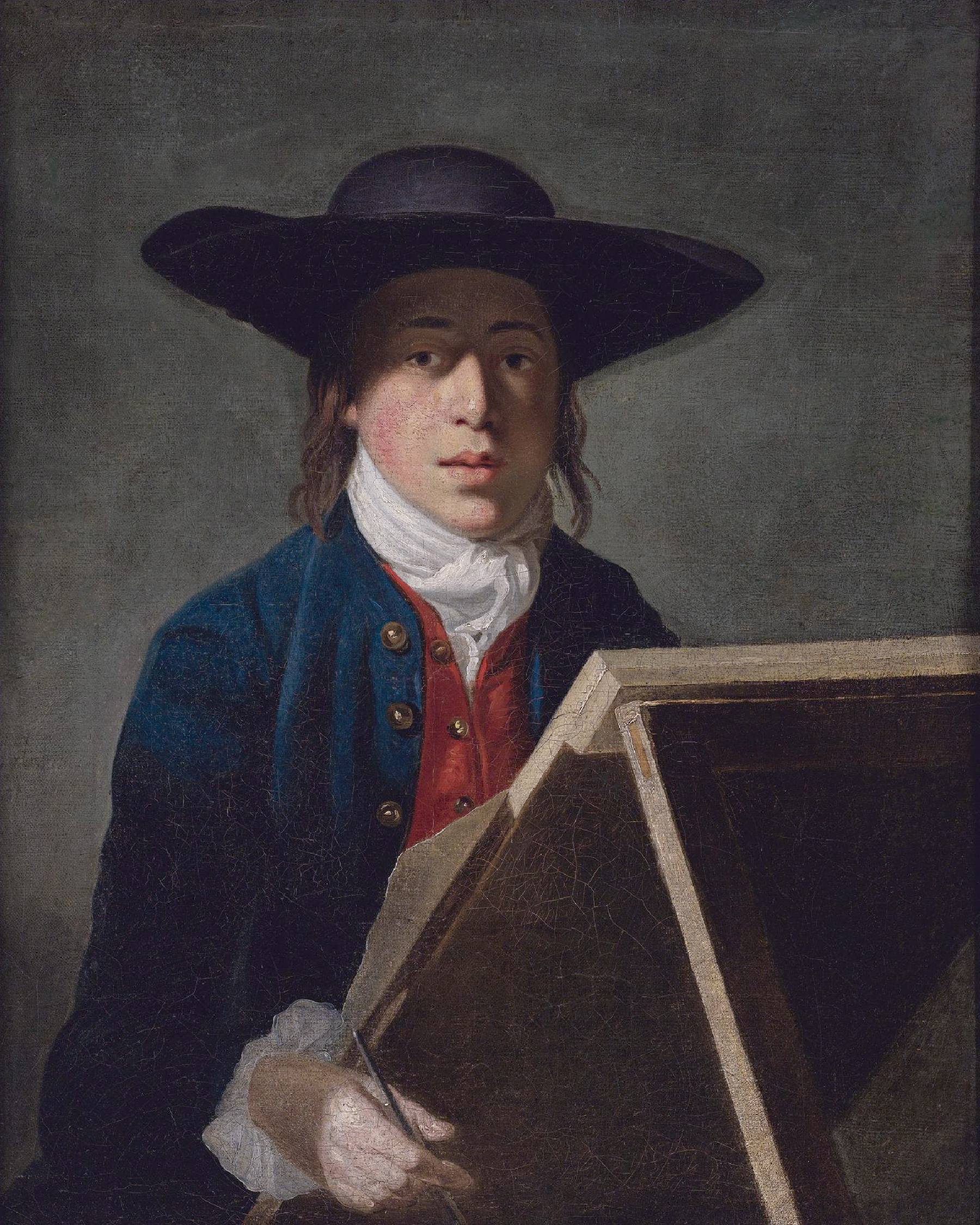
- Portrait by Henry Robert Morland, c. 1780
- Born: 26 June 1763; London, England
- Died: 29 October 1804 (aged 41); Brighton, England
- Spouse: Anne Ward (m. 1786)
- Parent: Henry Robert Morland (father)
- Relatives: George Henry Morland (grandfather)

George Morland (26 June 1763 – 29 October 1804) was an English painter. His early work was influenced by Francis Wheatley, but after the 1790s he came into his own style. His best compositions focus on rustic scenes: farms and hunting; smugglers and gypsies; and rich, textured landscapes informed by Dutch Golden Age painting.

Much of his work was intended for reproduction in prints, from which his publishers made a good deal more money than he did. Despite being a heavy drinker who enjoyed a rackety lifestyle, he was enormously prolific, though the quality of his work increasingly suffered. After many troubles with debts in his last decade, he died at the age of 41.

== Biography ==
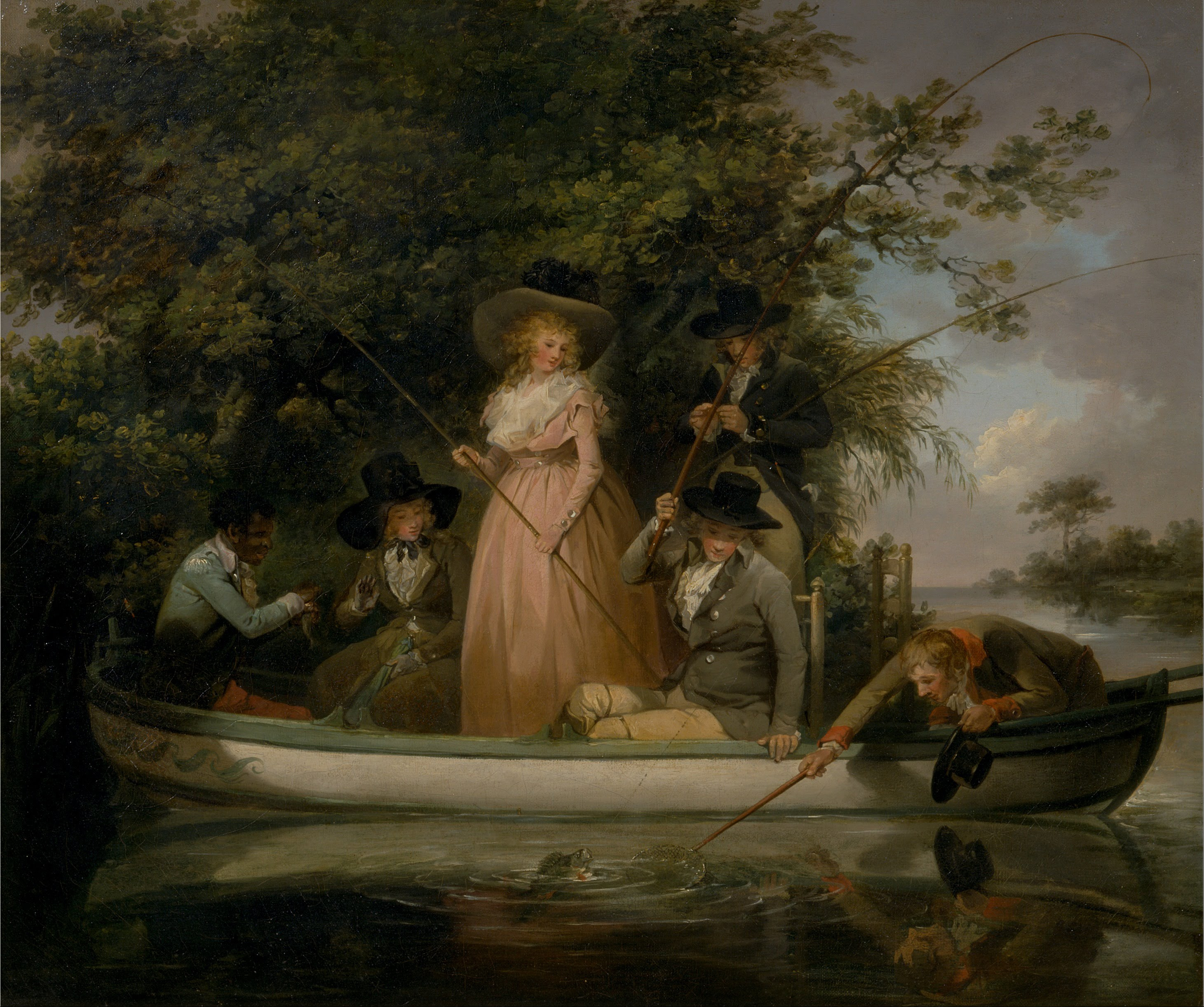
George Morland – A Party Angling

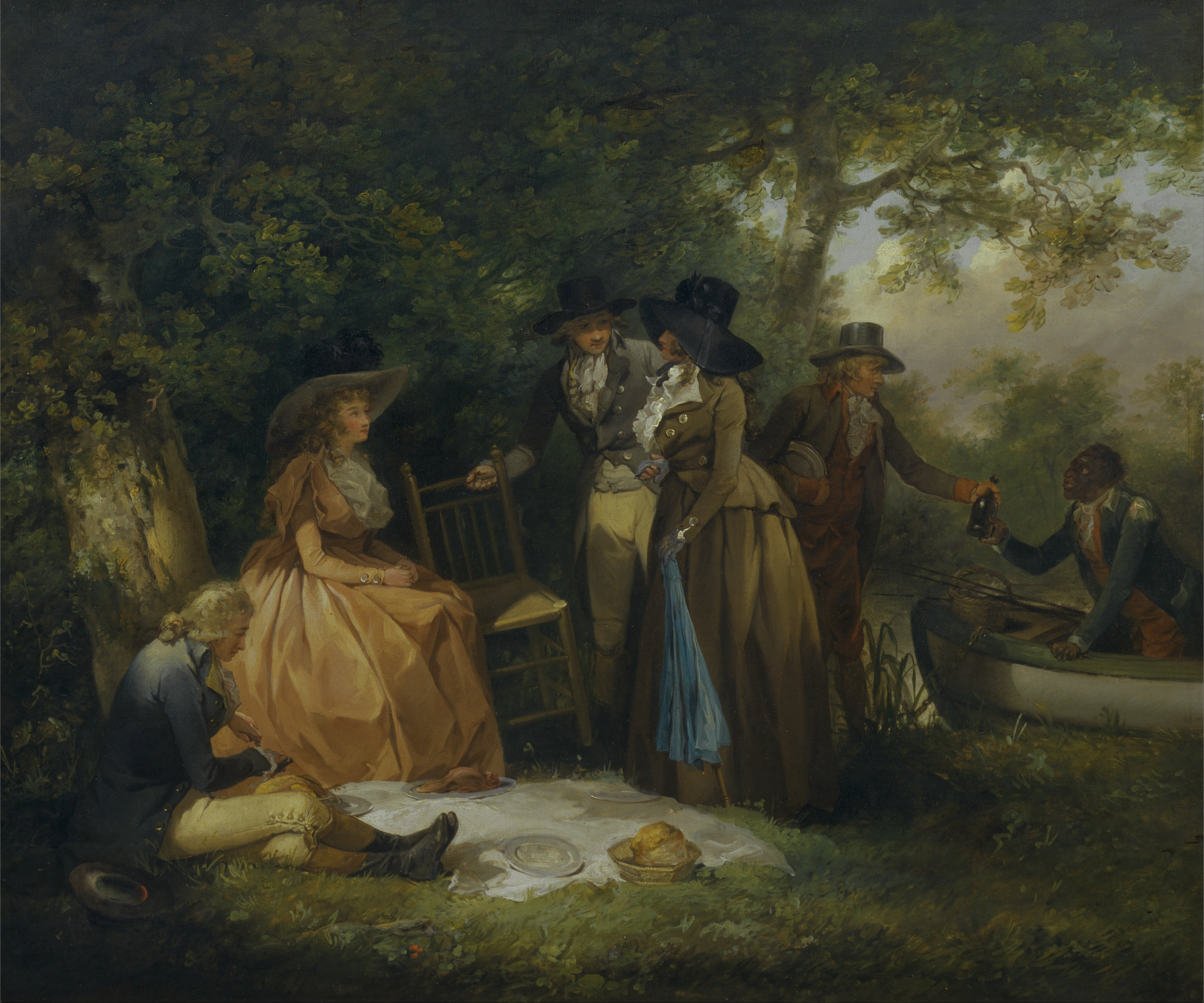
George Morland – The Anglers' Repast

George Morland was born in London on 26 June 1763. He was the son of Henry Robert Morland, and grandson of George Henry Morland, said by Cunningham to have been lineally descended from Sir Samuel Morland, while other biographers go so far as to say that he had only to claim the baronetcy in order to get it. Morland began to draw at the age of three years, and at the age of ten (1773) his name appears as an honorary exhibitor of sketches at the Royal Academy. He continued to exhibit at the Free Society in 1775 and 1776, and at the Society of Artists in 1777, and then again at the Royal Academy in 1778, 1779 and 1780.

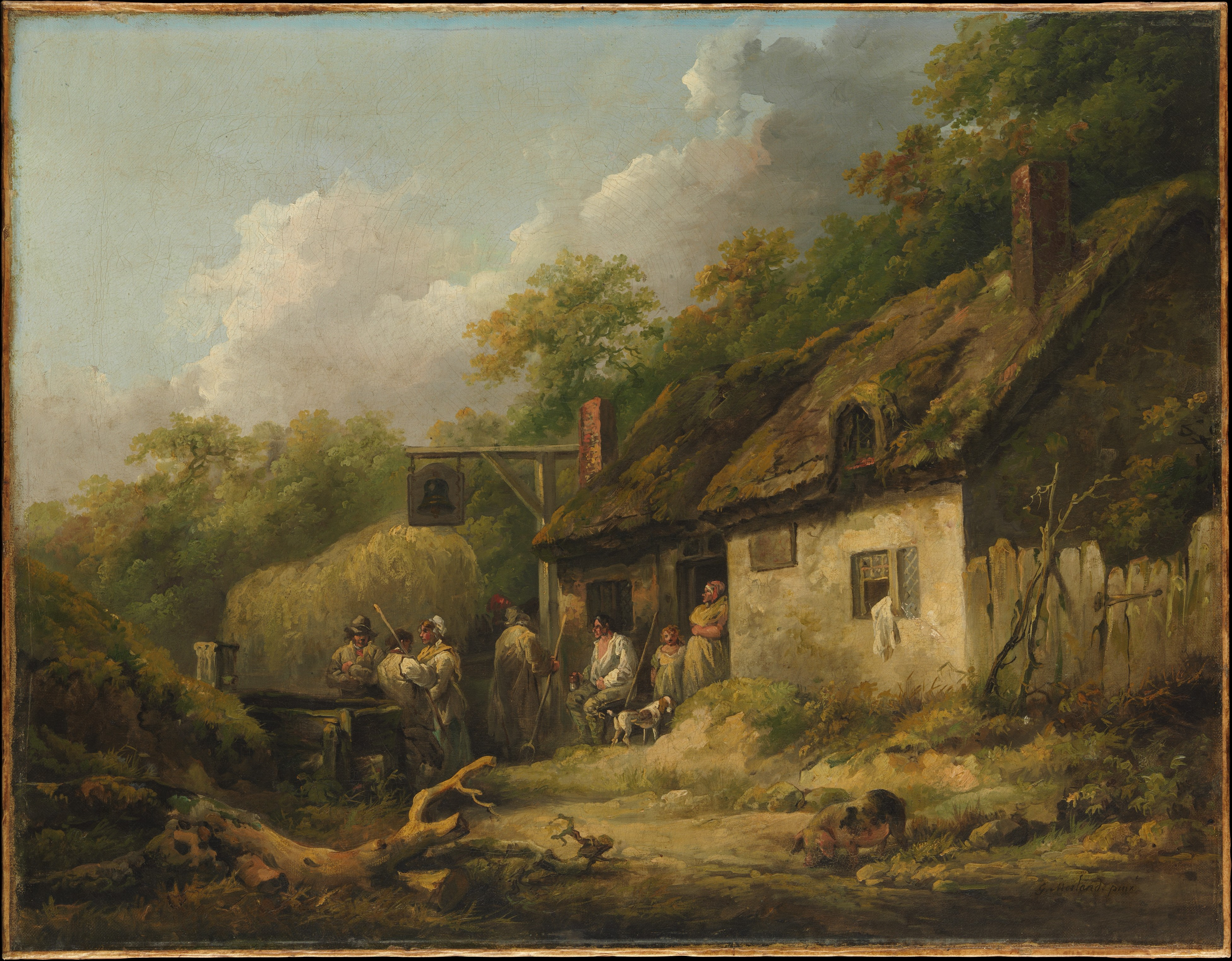
The Bell Inn at Kilburn, late 1780s

His talents were carefully cultivated by his father, who was accused of stimulating them unduly with a view to his own profit, shutting the child up in a garret to make drawings from pictures and casts for which he found a ready sale. The boy, on the other hand, is said to have soon found a way to make money for himself by hiding some of his drawings, and lowering them at nightfall out of his window to young accomplices, with whom he used to spend the proceeds in frolic and self-indulgence. It has been also asserted that his father, discovering this trick, tried to conciliate him by indulgence, humouring his whims and encouraging his low tastes.

He was set by his father to copy pictures of all kinds, but especially of the Dutch and Flemish masters. Among others he copied Fuseli's Nightmare and Reynolds's Garrick between Tragedy and Comedy. He was also introduced to Sir Joshua Reynolds, and obtained permission to copy his pictures, and all accounts agree that before he was seventeen he had obtained considerable reputation not only with his friends and the dealers, but among artists of repute. A convincing proof of the skill in original composition which he had then attained is the fine engraving by William Ward, after his picture of The Angler's Repast, which was published in November 1780 by John Raphael Smith.

It is said that before his apprenticeship to his father came to an end, in 1784, Romney offered to take him into his own house, with a salary of £300, on condition of his signing articles for three years. But Morland, we are told, had had enough of restraint, and after a rupture with his father he set up on his own account in 1784 or 1785 at the house of a picture dealer, and commenced that life which, in its combination of hard work and hard drinking, is almost without a parallel.

Morland soon became the mere slave of the dealer with whom he lived. His boon companions were "ostlers, potboys, horse jockeys, moneylenders, pawnbrokers, punks, and pugilists." In this company the handsome young artist swaggered, dressed in a green coat, with large yellow buttons, leather breeches, and top boots. "He was in the very extreme of foppish puppeyism", says Hassell; "his head, when ornamented according to his own taste, resembled a snowball, after the model of Tippey Bob, of dramatic memory, to which was attached a short, thick tail, not unlike a painter's brush." His youth and strong constitution enabled him to recover rapidly from his excesses, and he not only employed the intervals in painting, but at this time, or shortly afterwards, taught himself to play the violin. He made also an effort, and a successful one, to free himself from his task-master, and escaped to Margate, where he painted miniatures for a while. In 1785 he paid a short visit to France, whither his fame had preceded him, and where he had no lack of commissions.

Returning to London, he lodged in a house at Kensal Green, on the road to Harrow, near William Ward, intercourse with whose family seems for a time to have had a steadying influence. It resulted in his marriage with Miss Anne Ward (Nancy), the sister of his friend, in July 1786, and the bond between the families was strengthened a month later by the marriage of William Ward and Morland's sister Maria. The two newly married couples set up house together in High Street, Marylebone, and Morland for a while appeared to have become a reformed character.

He was now becoming known by such engravings from his pictures as the large 'Children Nutting' (1783), and several smaller and more sentimental subjects published in 1785, like the ' Lass of Livingston.' To 1786, the year of his marriage, is said to belong the series of 'Letitia or Seduction' (well known from the engravings published in 1789), in which with much of the narrative power of Hogarth, but with softer touches, the 'Progress' of Letitia is told in six scenes admirable in design, and painted with great skill, finish, and refinement. About this period he was fond of visiting the Isle of Wight, where he painted his best coast scenes, and studied life and character in a low public-house at Freshwater Gate, called the Cabin. In 1786 he painted The Wreck of the Haswell, an oil on canvas. It shows women and children clutching what little of the ship remains afloat while a crewman's eyes tell the eventual fate of his half-submerged body. It clearly conveys the terror and hopelessness that must grip people when they know they're taking their last breath.

=== Later life ===
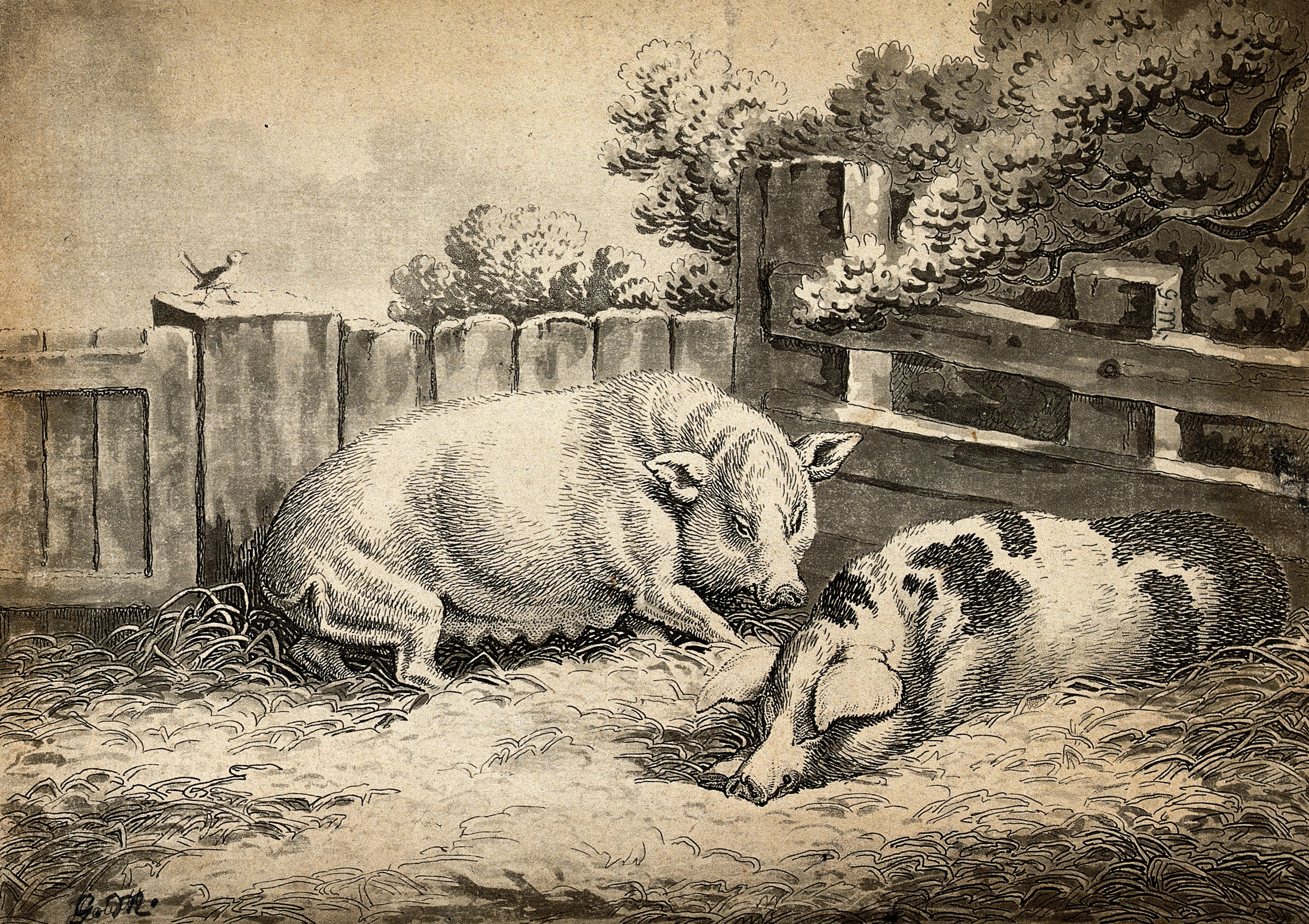
Etching after Morland, Two pigs lying in straw in an outdoor pen.

After three months the double household was broken up by dissensions between the ladies, and Morland took lodgings in Great Portland Street, and afterwards moved to Camden Town, where he lived in a small house in Pleasing Passage, at the back of the tavern known as Mother Black Cap. The attractions of the neighbouring inns, and of the Assembly Rooms at Kentish Town, now proved too strong for him, and he returned to all his bad habits. A long illness of his wife, following her confinement and death of the child, further weakened the influence of home, and he neglected and ultimately left his wife, though he seems to have made her an allowance as long as he lived.

When he finally separated from her it is not easy to determine, and his course afterwards was so erratic that it is difficult to trace it with minuteness and order. He moved from Pleasing Passage to Warrens Lane, and seems for some time to have made his headquarters at Paddington. It was here probably that he painted the celebrated picture of 'The Inside of a Stable,' now in the National Gallery, which was exhibited at the Royal Academy in 1791. The stable is said to be that of the White Lion Inn at Paddington, opposite to which he lived. At this time he was at the plenitude of his power, and dissipation had not impaired the sureness of his touch, his unusually fine sense of colour, or the refinement of his artistic feeling. He exhibited again in 1793 and 1794, but though he still painted finely he had become completely the prey of the dealers, painting as it were from hand to mouth to supply himself with funds for his extravagances.

His art was so popular that he might have easily lived for a week on the earnings of a day. He was besieged by dealers who came to him, as it is said, with a purse in one hand and a bottle in the other. The amount of work he got through was prodigious: he would paint one or two pictures a day, and once painted a large landscape with six figures in the course of six hours. Every demand that was made upon him, whether a tavern score or the renewal of a bill, was paid for by a picture; the pictures were often worth much more than the value of the account to be settled.

== Career ==
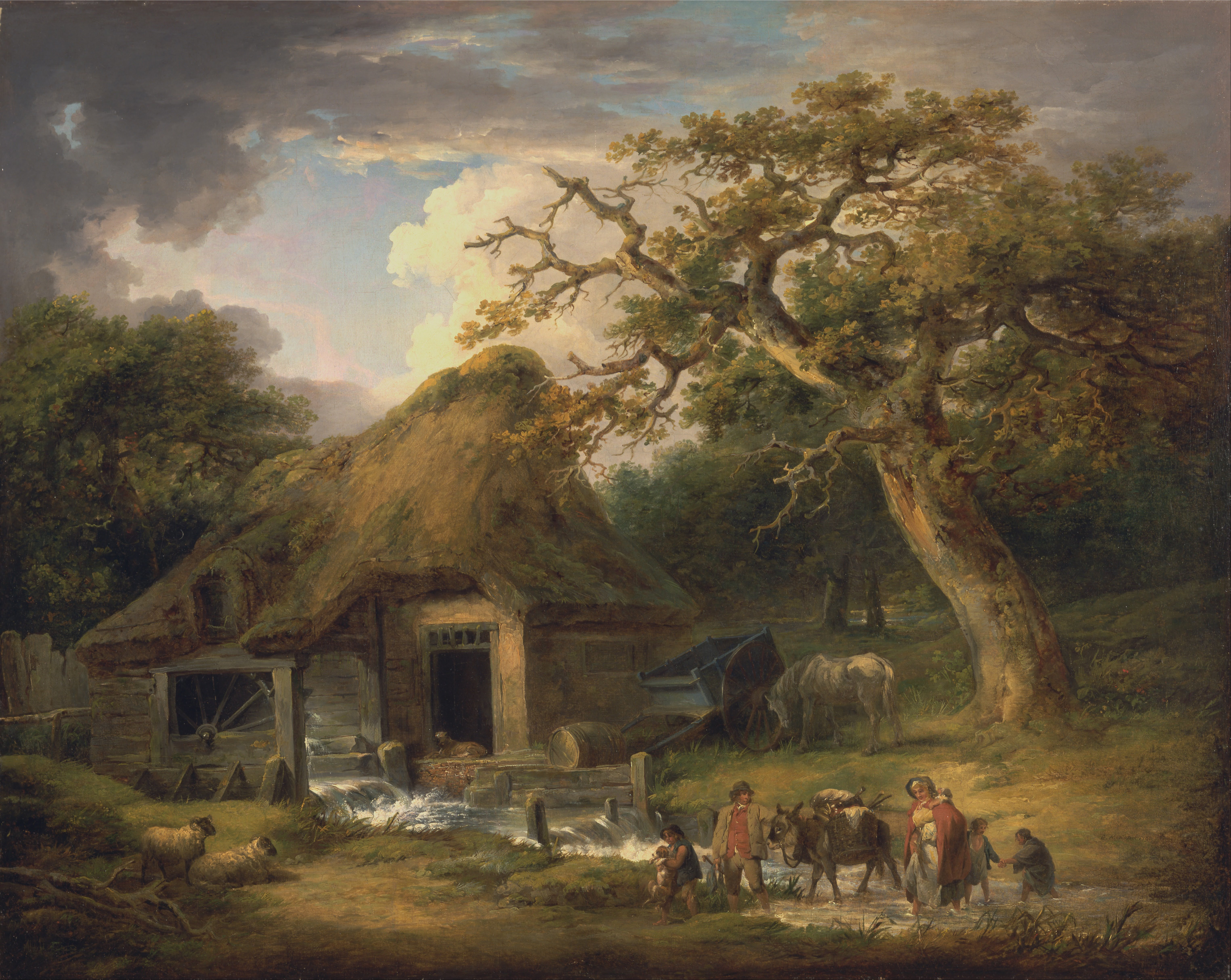
The Old Water Mill

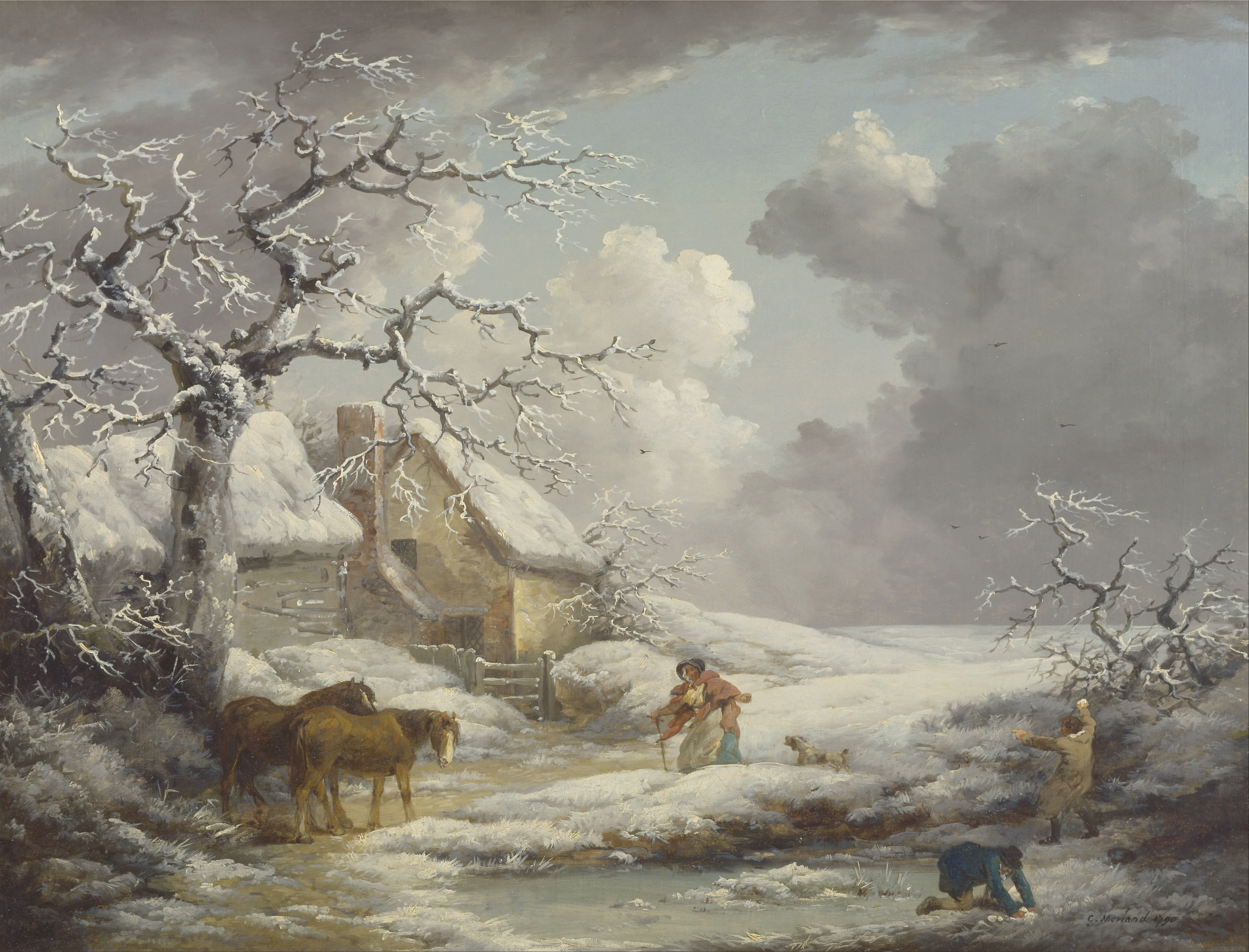
George Morland - Winter Landscape

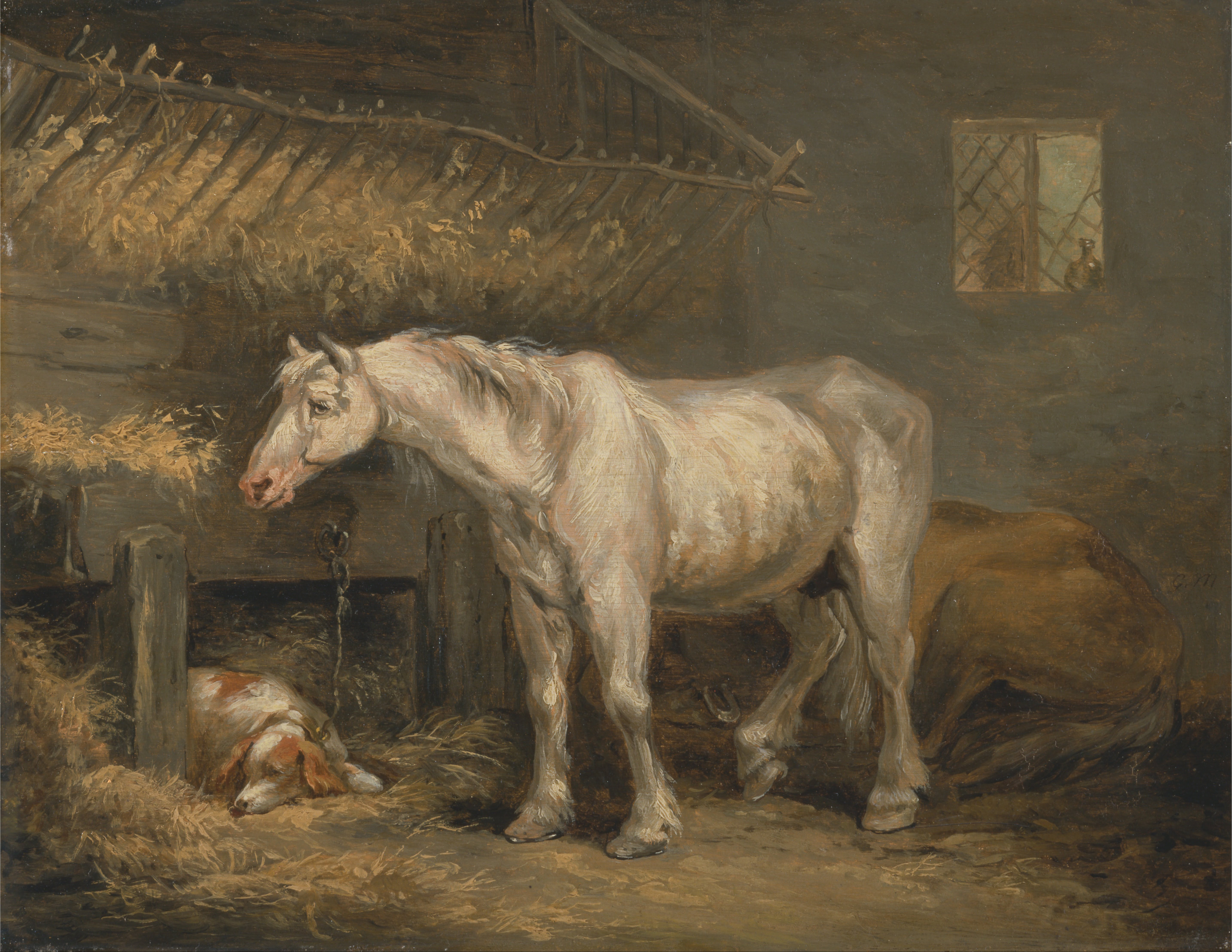
Horses with a dog in a stable

From 1788 to 1792 inclusive, over a hundred engravings after Morland were published. They included 'A Visit to the Child at Home' and 'A Visit to the Boarding School,' two compositions of remarkable refinement and elegance, and a number of charming scenes of children's sports, like 'Children Birdnesting,' 'Juvenile Navigation,' 'The Kite entangled,' 'Blind Man's Buff,' and 'Children playing at Soldiers.' Equalling if not exceeding these in popularity were scenes of moral contrast, like 'The Fruits of early Industry and Economy' (1789) and 'The Effects of Extravagance and Idleness' (1794), the 'Miseries of Idleness' and the 'Comforts of Industry,' both published in 1790, and subjects appealing to national sentiment, like 'The Slave Trade' (1791) and 'African Hospitality.' Five hundred copies of the engraving of 'Dancing Dogs' (1790) were sold in a few weeks, and one dealer gave an order for nine dozen sets of the four plates of 'The Deserter' (1791). Elegant and refined subjects gradually gave place exclusively to scenes from humble life in town and country, including the coast with fishermen and smugglers, sporting scenes, but more frequently, in a plain but seldom a coarse manner, the life of the cottage, the stable, and the inn-yard, with lively groups of natural men and women, and still more natural horses, donkeys, dogs, pigs, poultry, and other animals. About 250 separate engravings from his works appeared in his lifetime.

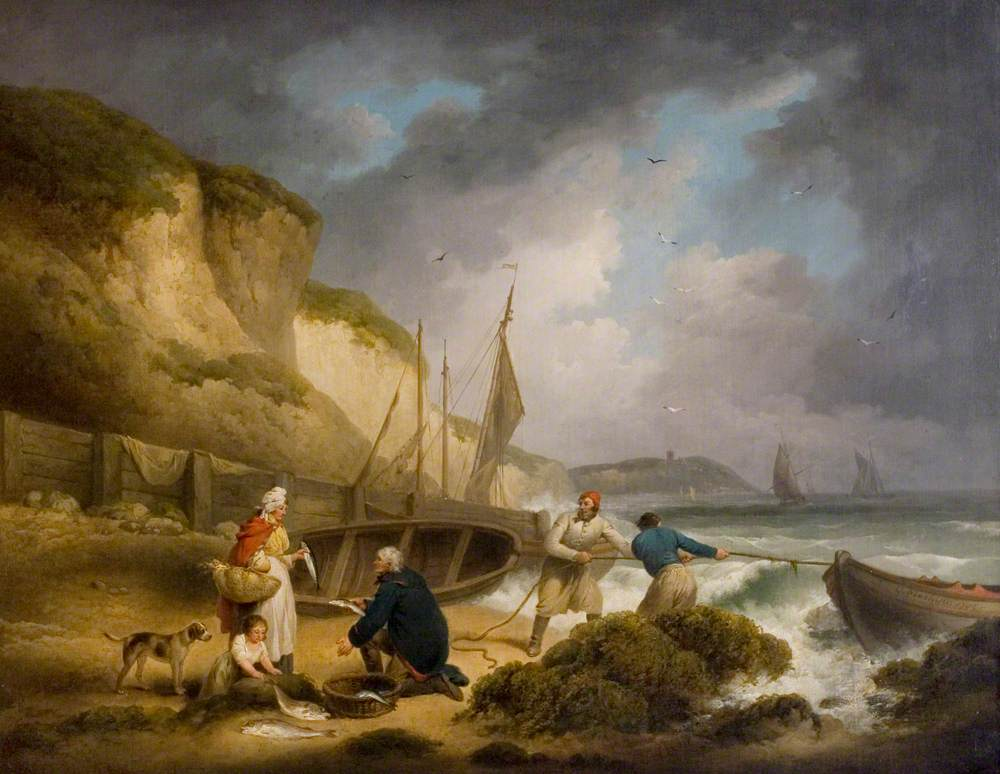
Selling Fish, 1799

Although the publishers reaped the benefits of their large sale, Morland's credit and resources enabled him for some years to lead the rollicking life he loved without much pressure of care. At one time he kept eight saddle horses at the White Lion. As time went on debts increased and creditors became more pressing, and he lived a hunted life, only able to escape from the bailiffs by his knowledge of London and the assistance of friends and dealers. He flitted from one house to another, residing among other places at Lambeth, East Sheen, Queen Anne Street, the Minories, Kensington, and Hackney. At Hackney his seclusion aroused the suspicion that he was a forger of bank notes, and his premises were searched at the insistence of the bank directors, who afterwards made him a present of 40l. for the inconvenience caused by their mistake.

Dealers and innkeepers also would keep rooms ready for him to paint in, supplied with the necessary materials, and there was generally some dealer at hand ready to carry off his pictures before they were dry, often before they were finished. Morland was not, however, much more scrupulous in his dealings than the dealers themselves, and a picture begun under contract with one would be parted with to another who had money in his hand, if the rightful owner was not there to claim it. In this way a number of pictures got into the market commenced by Morland, and finished by inferior hands, while hundreds of copies were made and sold as originals. 'I once saw,' says Hassell, 'twelve copies from a small picture of Morland's at one time in a dealer's shop, with the original in the centre.' Another dealer (according to Redgrave), in whose house he painted under contract in the morning for several years (commencing about 1794), had each morning's work regularly copied. Occasionally Morland managed to escape from both dealers and bailiffs. Once he paid a visit to Claude Lorraine Smith in Leicestershire. He was apprehended as a spy at Yarmouth. He painted the sign of an inn called the Black Bull, somewhere on the road between Deal and London.

In November 1799, Morland was at last arrested for debt, but was allowed to take lodgings 'within the rules,' and these became the rendezvous of his most discreditable friends. During this mitigated confinement he sank lower and lower. He is said to have often been drunk for days together, and to have generally slept on the floor in a helpless condition. It is probable that these stories are exaggerated, for he still produced an enormous quantity of good work. 'For his brother alone,' says Redgrave, 'he painted 192 pictures between 1800 and 1804, and he probably painted as many more for other dealers during the same period, his terms being four guineas a day and his drink.' Another account says that 'during his last eight years he painted 490 pictures for his brother, and probably three hundred more for others, besides making hundreds of drawings. His total production is estimated at no less than four thousand pictures.

In 1802, he was released under the Insolvent Debtors Act, (Note: Presumably the Insolvent Debtors Relief Act 1801, 41 Geo. 3, c. 70.) but his health was ruined and his habits irremediable. About this time he was seized with palsy and lost the use of his left hand, so that he could not hold his palette. Notwithstanding he seems to have gone on painting to the last, when he was arrested again for a publican's score, and died in a sponging-house in Eyre Street, Cold Bath Fields, on 27 October 1804. His wife died three days afterwards, and both were buried together in the burial-ground attached to St. James's Chapel in the Hampstead Road.

== Works ==
The finest of Morland's pictures were executed between 1790 and 1794, and amongst them his picture The inside of a stable (Tate Britain, London) may be reckoned as a masterpiece. In the last eight years of his life Morland produced some nine hundred paintings, besides over a thousand drawings.

He exhibited regularly at the Royal Academy from 1784 down to 1804. Amongst these was the remarkable 1788 picture Execrable Human Traffic or the Affectionate Slaves. Two years later he exhibited a companion picture showing Africans caring for shipwrecked Europeans. They were subsequently published as prints and served to promote abolitionism.

Morland was a close friend of fellow artist William Armfield Hobday (1771–1831) who painted a portrait of the artist which is still intact. William Collins was an informal pupil and later wrote a biography.

== Gallery ==
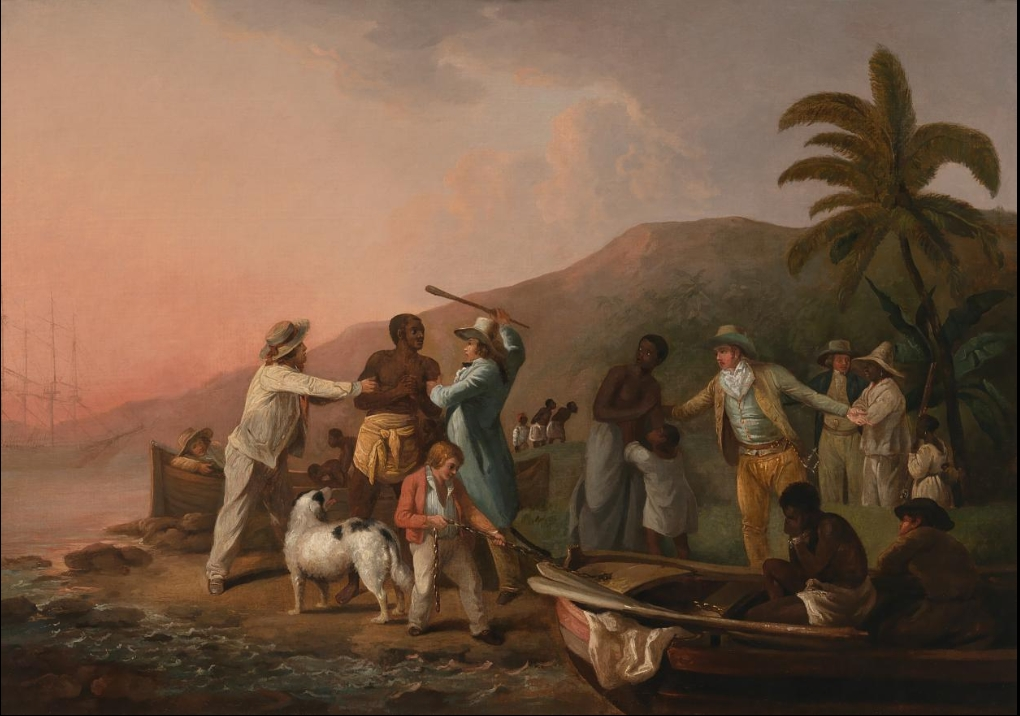
Slave Trade, 1788

A Farrier's Shop, 1793

== See also ==
- English school of painting

== References and sources ==
Sources

- Monkhouse, William Cosmo (1894). "Morland, George (1763-1804)" . In Lee, Sidney (ed.). Dictionary of National Biography. Vol. 39. London: Smith, Elder & Co. pp. 64–67.
- Perkins, Diane. "Morland, George". Oxford Dictionary of National Biography (online ed.). Oxford University Press. doi:10.1093/ref:odnb/19278. (Subscription, Wikipedia Library access or UK public library membership required.)
- Chesterton, G. K (Ed.). Famous Paintings, Volume 2 (Cassell, 1913), Nos. 1 & 16.
- John Hassell. Memoirs of the life of the late George Morland (London: J. Cunee, 1806).
- Richardson, Ralph. George Morland, painter, London (1763-1804) (London: E. Stock, 1895),
- J. T. Nettleship. George Morland: and the evolution from him of some later painters (London: Seeley, 1898).
- Baily, J. T. H. & Hardie, Martin. George Morland; a biographical essay (London, Otto, 1906).
- Williamson, G. C. George Morland; his life and works (London: Bell & sons, 1907).
- Wilson, David Henry. George Morland (Walter Scott publishing co., 1907).
- Gilbey, Sir Walter, & Cuming, E. D. George Morland, his life and works (Adam & Charles Black, 1907).
- Cuming, E. D. George Morland: sixteen examples in colour of the artist's work (London : A.& C. Black, 1910).
- Henderson, B.L.K. Morland and Ibbetson (Philip Allan, London, 1923).
- Winter, D. George Morland: 1763-1804 (Stanford University, 1977).
