= Scavaig River =

Scavaig River River Coruisk
- The mouth of the Scavaig River meeting Loch na Cuilce, looking south towards Eigg

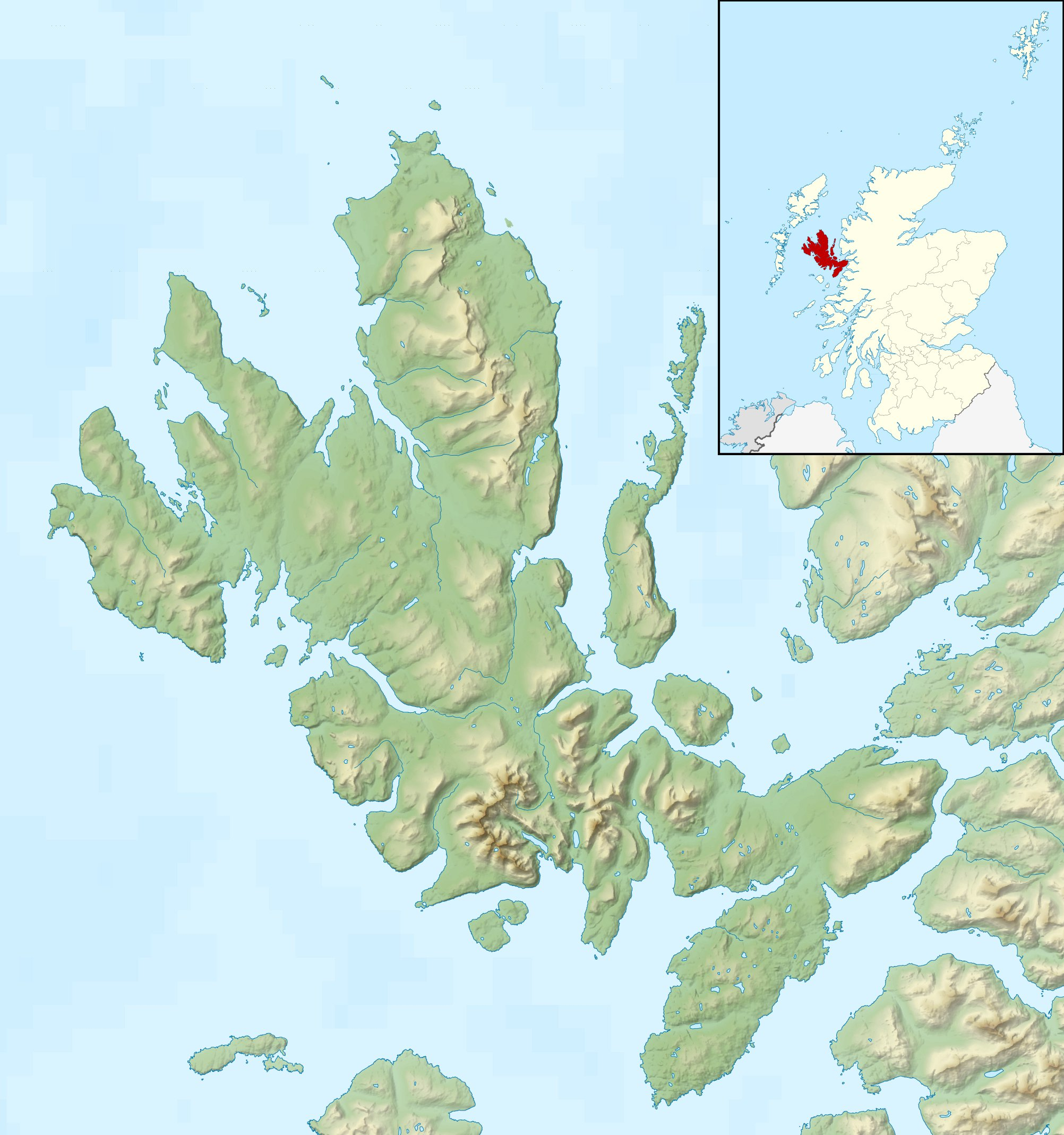
- Location of the Scavaig River on the Isle of Skye

Location
- Country: United Kingdom
- Constituent country: Scotland
- Council area: Highland
- Island: Isle of Skye

Physical characteristics
- Source: Loch Coruisk
  - location: Cuillin, Isle of Skye
  - coordinates: 57°12′07″N 06°09′49″W
  - elevation: 8 m (26 ft)
- Mouth: Loch na Cuilce (Loch Scavaig)
  - location: Isle of Skye
  - coordinates: 57°11′58″N 06°09′43″W
  - elevation: 0 m (0 ft)
- Length: 300 m (330 yd) (approx.)

Basin features
- Progression: Loch Scavaig → Sea of the Hebrides
- Bridges: Stepping stones (footpath)

The Scavaig River (also known as the River Coruisk) is a short river on the Isle of Skye in the Scottish Highlands. Located within the Cuillin mountain range, it serves as the sole outflow of the freshwater Loch Coruisk, flowing southward for approximately 300 metres (330 yd) to empty into the tidal waters of Loch na Cuilce, an inner inlet of Loch Scavaig.

At only a few hundred metres in length, the Scavaig River is frequently cited in geographical and mountaineering literature as a contender for the title of the shortest river in the United Kingdom.

== Geography and course ==
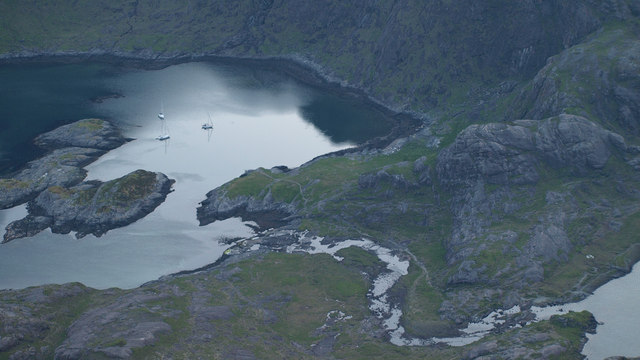
View of the Scavaig River (centre) flowing from Loch Coruisk into Loch na Cuilce, seen from Sgùrr na Strì

Hemmed in by the steep slopes of the Black Cuillin to the west and Sgùrr na Strì to the east, the river occupies a narrow rock channel separating the glacial basin of Loch Coruisk from the sea. Because the surrounding mountain peaks rise almost directly from the coastline, the outflow drops roughly 8 metres (26 ft) over a short series of rocky cascades and pools before meeting the sea loch.

The river's claim as the shortest river to drain into the sea in the United Kingdom is shared or contested with the River Morar in the West Highlands, which drains Loch Morar into the Sound of Sleat over a course of roughly 900 metres (980 yd). Differences in measurement arise depending on where tidal limits are drawn at high and low water springs.

== Geology ==
The Scavaig River flows directly across a natural sill of layered gabbro and dolerite that impounds Loch Coruisk above sea level. According to the British Geological Survey, the glaciated rock exposures around the Scavaig River and adjacent Druim Hain represent some of the clearest and most accessible examples of layered ultrabasic igneous rock in the British Isles. Eroded sediments near the river mouth also contain heavy mineral concentrations of chromite and olivine derived from the Cuillin igneous complex.

== Ecology and conservation ==
The river is monitored by the Scottish Environment Protection Agency (SEPA) as part of its West Highland coastal and freshwater management area. Under Scottish Government freshwater fishery regulations, the Scavaig catchment (grouped within the Snizort fishery district) is managed for Atlantic salmon and sea trout. Due to low spawning stock estimates, it is designated as a Category 3 river, requiring mandatory catch-and-release for all rod-caught salmon.

== Mountaineering and access ==
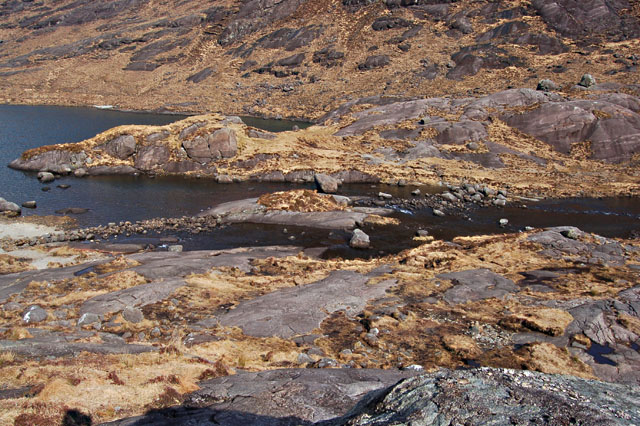
Stepping stones crossing the Scavaig River

No public roads reach the Scavaig River; access is restricted to sea vessels landing at Loch na Cuilce (such as seasonal passenger boats from Elgol) or long-distance hillwalking routes from Glen Sligachan, Glenbrittle, or Kilmarie.

A line of large natural stepping stones spans the river near its outflow from Loch Coruisk, forming the main pedestrian crossing for walkers traversing between the eastern and western sides of the valley. Walkers approaching from Kilmarie and Camasunary must first negotiate an exposed coastal rock traverse known as the "Bad Step" before reaching the stepping stones. Because the river drains a steep, high-rainfall mountain catchment, heavy rain causes it to rise rapidly into spate, submerging the stones and making the crossing hazardous or impassable.

Approximately 100 metres (110 yd) west of the river mouth stands the Coruisk Memorial Hut, an alpine hut operated by the Glasgow section of the Junior Mountaineering Club of Scotland (JMCS) as a base for climbers on the Cuillin ridge.
