= Sgùrr na Strì =

Mountain on the Isle of Skye, Scotland

- Sgùrr na Strì rising above Loch na Cuilce and Loch Scavaig

Highest point
- Elevation: 495 m (1,624 ft)
- Prominence: 226 m (741 ft)
- Listing: Marilyn, TuMP
- Coordinates: 57°11′55″N 06°08′26″W

Naming
- English translation: Peak of Strife
- Language of name: Scottish Gaelic

Geography
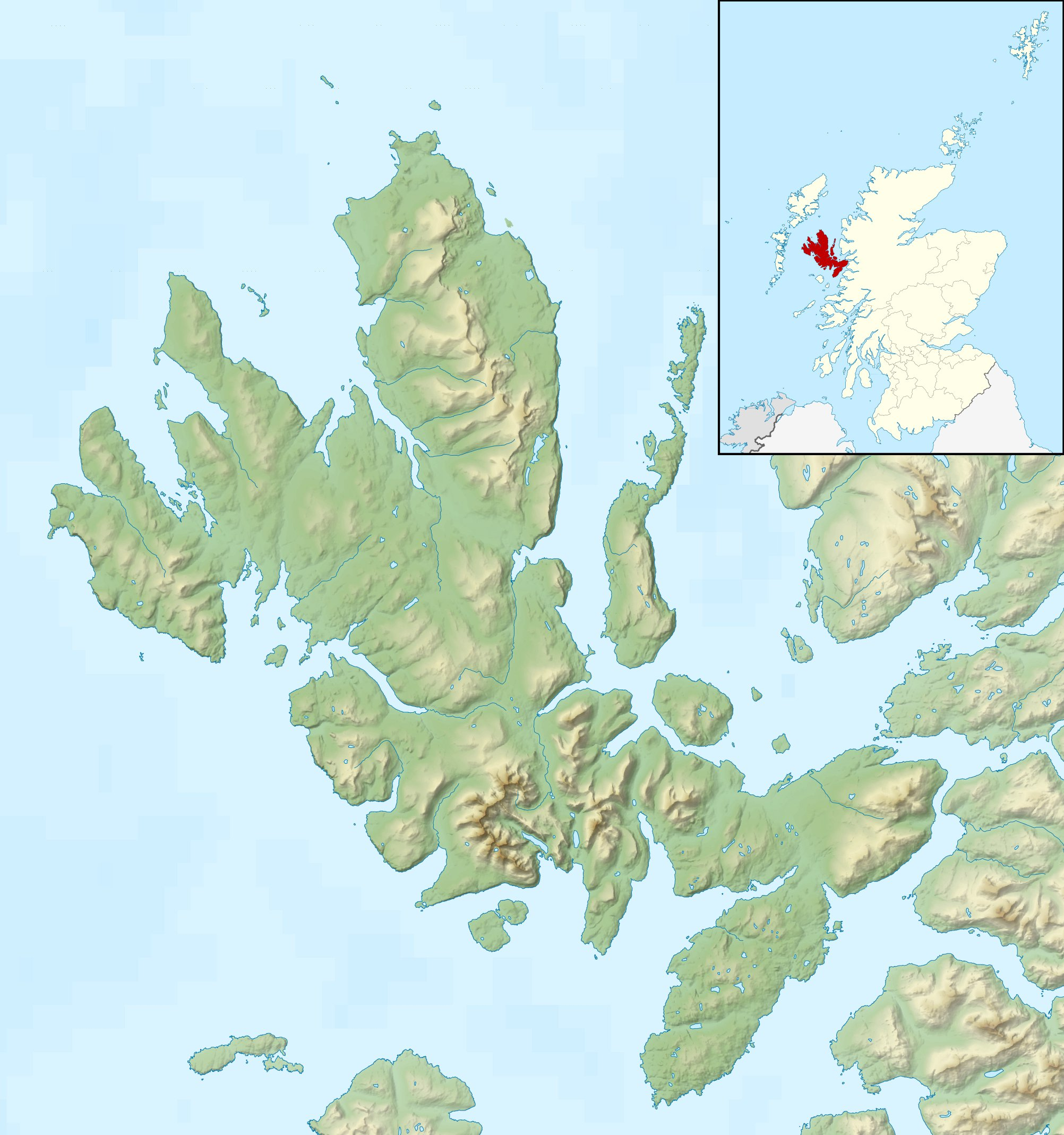
- Location of Sgùrr na Strì on the Isle of Skye
- Location: Isle of Skye, Highland, Scotland
- Parent range: Cuillin
- OS grid: NG500192

Sgùrr na Strì (Scottish Gaelic: Sgùrr na Strì, meaning "Peak of Strife") is a hill on the Isle of Skye in the Scottish Highlands, rising to a height of 495 metres (1,624 ft). Despite its modest elevation, the summit is widely regarded in hillwalking and mountaineering literature as offering one of the finest mountain views in Great Britain.

== Geography and geology ==
Sgùrr na Strì stands on a prominent rocky peninsula separating the glacial basin of Loch Coruisk from the coastal bay of Camasunary. Its steep western slopes plunge directly into Loch na Cuilce and the upper reaches of Loch Scavaig, overlooking the short course of the Scavaig River. To the north, the hill is connected via a col at 269 metres (883 ft) to the ridge of Druim Hain and the higher peak of Sgùrr Hain.

Geologically, the hill is composed of coarse-grained gabbro and basalt forming part of the Skye Palaeogene igneous centre. Ice-scoured gabbro slabs characterize much of its upper slopes and summit plateau. With a topographic prominence of 226 metres (741 ft), Sgùrr na Strì is classified as a Marilyn.

== Summit panorama ==
Because of its isolated position directly opposite the main horseshoe of the Black Cuillin, the summit cairn commands an unobstructed panorama across Loch Coruisk to the jagged peaks of Sgùrr nan Gillean, Sgùrr Alasdair, Sgùrr Dubh Mòr, and Gars-bheinn, alongside Blà Bheinn to the northeast. To the south, the view extends across Loch Scavaig and the Sea of the Hebrides towards the islands of Rùm, Eigg, Canna, and Mull.

== Ascent routes ==
Because no public roads approach the area, climbing Sgùrr na Strì involves a long wilderness walk or a maritime approach:

- From Glen Sligachan: A long round-trip route follows the path south from Sligachan through Glen Sligachan, ascending the ridge of Druim Hain before traversing rocky, pathless gabbro slopes to the summit.
- From Kilmarie and Camasunary: A shorter coastal approach from Kilmarie crosses the ridge to Camasunary bay, requiring walkers to ford the Abhainn Camas Fhionnairigh and negotiate an exposed rock traverse above the sea known as the "Bad Step" before ascending from the shore near Loch na Cuilce.
- From Loch Coruisk: Walkers arriving by passenger boat from Elgol at Loch na Cuilce can cross the Scavaig River stepping stones and climb the rough western flank directly to the summit.
