= Loch Scavaig =

Sea loch on the Isle of Skye, Scotland

- Loch Sgamhaig (Scottish Gaelic)
- View from Elgol across Loch Scavaig towards the Cuillin mountains

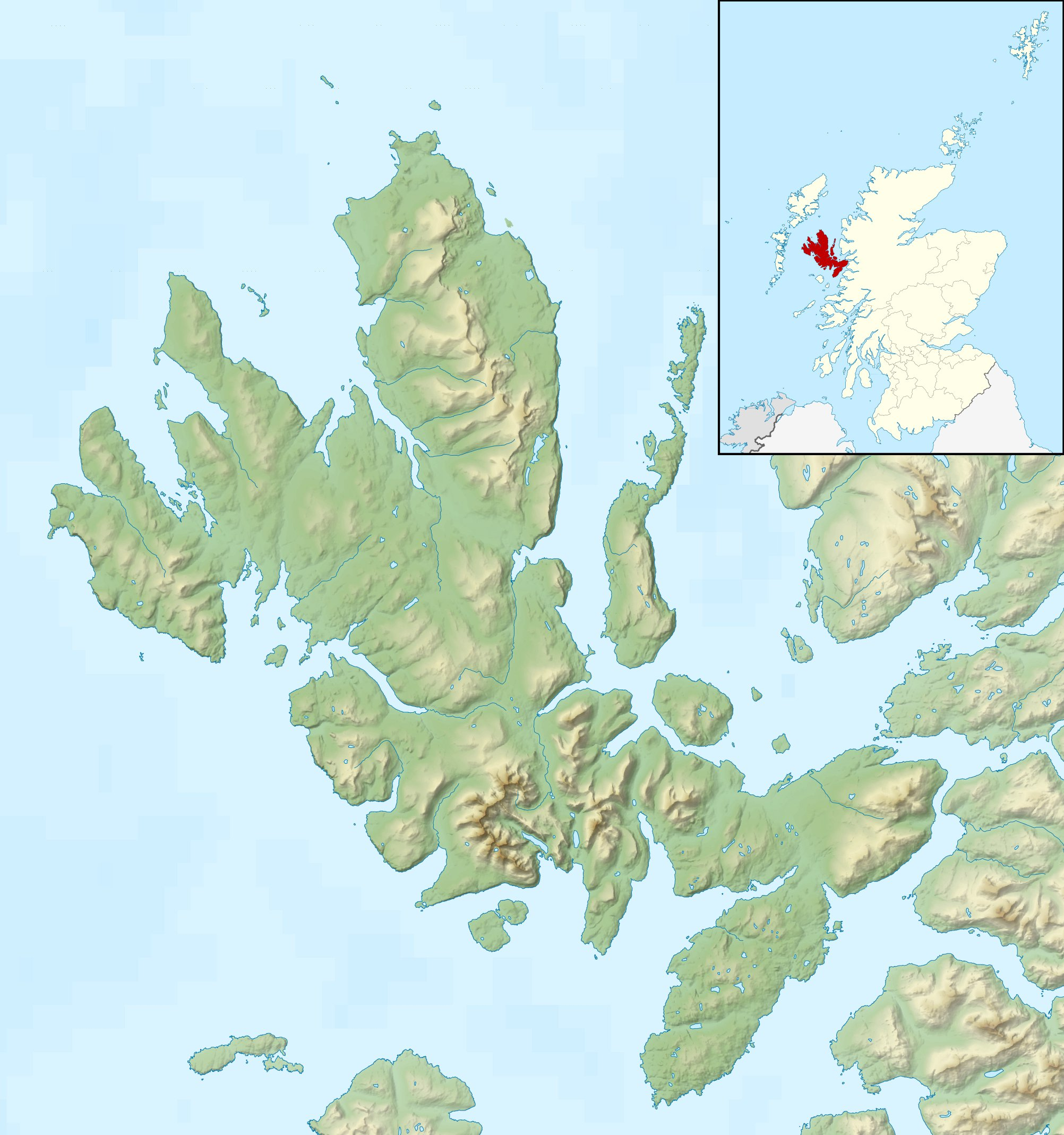
- Location of Loch Scavaig on the Isle of Skye
- Coordinates: 57°10′30″N 06°08′30″W
- Type: Sea loch
- Primary inflows: Scavaig River, Abhainn Camas Fhionnairigh
- Primary outflows: Sea of the Hebrides
- Max. length: 7.2 km (4.5 mi) (approx.)
- Max. width: 6.4 km (4.0 mi) (at mouth)
- Surface elevation: 0 m (0 ft)
- Islands: Eilean Reamhar, Sgeir Dubh
- Settlements: Elgol, Camasunary

Loch Scavaig (Scottish Gaelic: Loch Sgamhaig) is a large sea loch on the southwestern coast of the Isle of Skye in the Scottish Highlands. Opening southward into the Sea of the Hebrides, the loch is bordered by the Strathaird peninsula to the east and the steep, glaciated slopes of the Cuillin mountain range to the north and west.

== Geography and hydrology ==
Loch Scavaig is roughly triangular in shape, narrowing from a wide entrance facing the islands of Rùm, Eigg, and Canna to an enclosed rocky head beneath Sgùrr na Strì. Its northernmost inner inlet, Loch na Cuilce, receives the freshwater discharge of Loch Coruisk via the short Scavaig River. To the northeast, the bay of Camasunary receives the waters of the Abhainn Camas Fhionnairigh.

The coastline is largely uninhabited and precipitous, with the main exception of the fishing and crofting township of Elgol situated on the eastern shore along the Strathaird peninsula. Several small rocky islets and skerries lie within the loch, including Eilean Reamhar and Sgeir Dubh, which provide haul-out sites for common and grey seals.

== Geology ==
The loch occupies a glacially over-deepened basin carved along the boundary of the Skye Palaeogene igneous complex. Its western and northern shores are composed of dark, coarse-grained gabbro and peridotite forming the Black Cuillin, while the eastern shore along Strathaird consists primarily of Jurassic sandstone and limestone intruded by basaltic dykes.

== History and culture ==
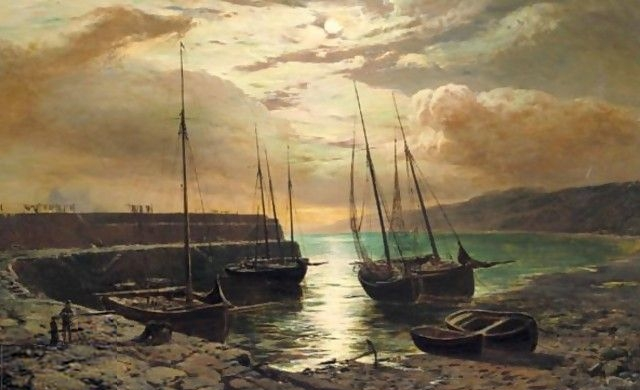
Loch Scavaig by Sidney RIchard Percy

The Lord of the Isles by Sir Walter Scott

During the aftermath of the Jacobite rising of 1745, Charles Edward Stuart landed on the shores of Loch Scavaig in July 1746 while evading government forces, travelling from the Outer Hebrides via Elgol before taking shelter at Prince Charlie's Cave, Elgol on the Strathaird coast.

In the 19th century, the dramatic mountain backdrop of Loch Scavaig and adjacent Loch Coruisk became an iconic subject of Romantic literature and art. Sir Walter Scott featured the austere cliffs of Loch Scavaig in his 1815 narrative poem The Lord of the Isles, while J. M. W. Turner painted Loch Coruisk, Skye (1831–1834) after sketching the upper head of the loch.

=== Namesake ===
The Royal Navy Loch-class frigate HMS Loch Scavaig (K648) was named after the loch. Built by Charles Hill & Sons at Bristol and launched by Queen Mary on 9 September 1944, the frigate saw service during the final months of the Second World War, earning the battle honour Atlantic 1945 after assisting in the sinking of the German submarine U-1014 off Lough Foyle in February 1945. Following post-war deployments in the East Indies and the Mediterranean, she was placed in reserve and sold for breaking up at Genoa in September 1959.

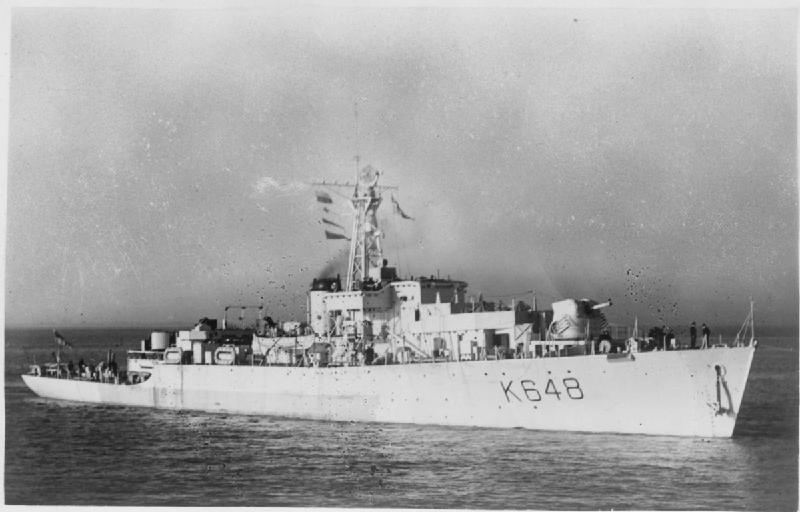
HMS Loch Scavaig

== Access and navigation ==
While exposed to heavy swells from the southwest during winter gales, the inner reaches of Loch Scavaig, particularly Loch na Cuilce, offer sheltered anchorage for small craft. Seasonal passenger boats operate regularly from Elgol across the loch to land walkers near the Scavaig River, providing the primary maritime access route to Loch Coruisk and the southern Cuillin.
