= Loch na Cuilce =

Sea loch on the Isle of Skye, Scotland

- Aerial view of Loch na Cuilce

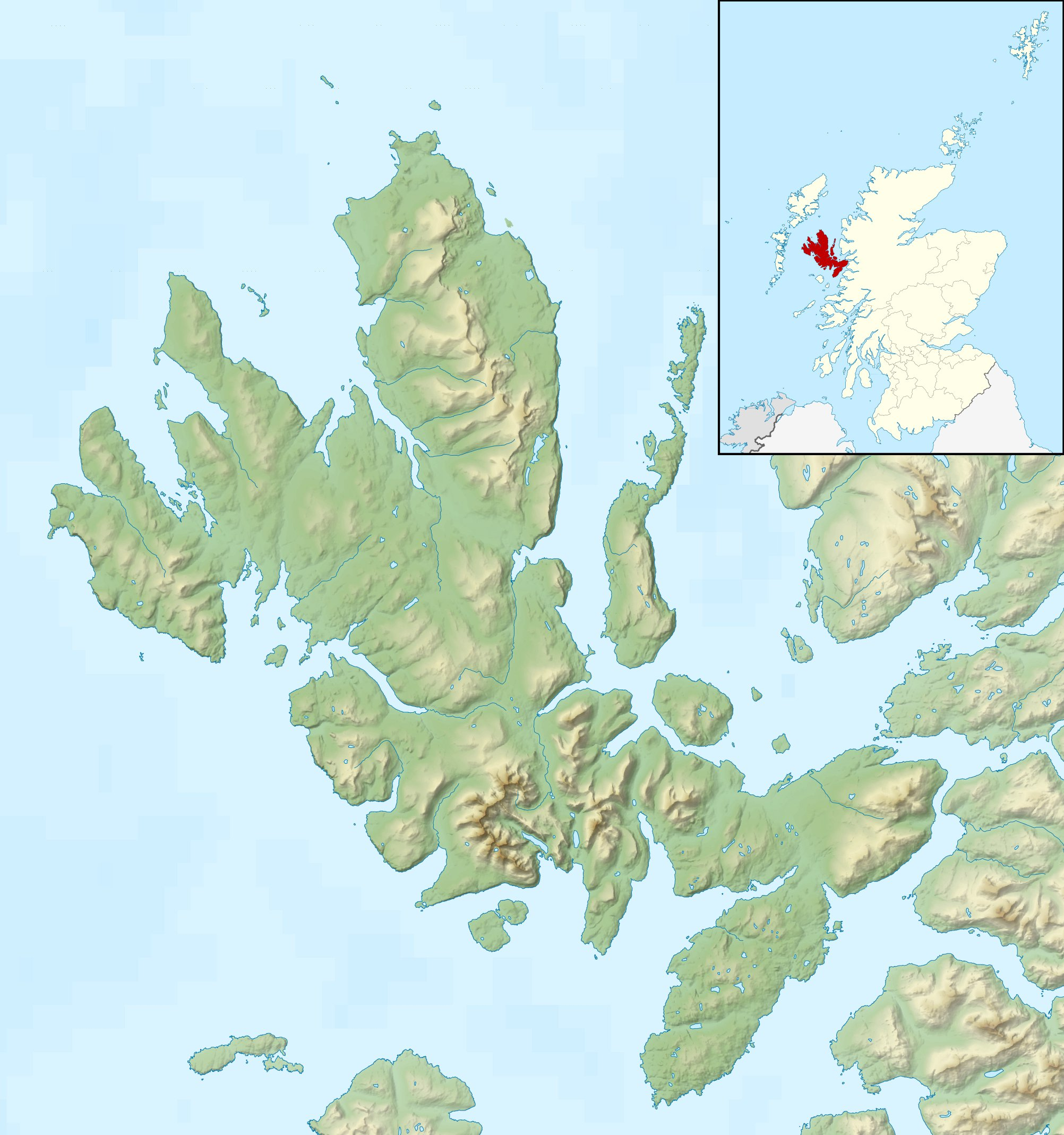
- Location of Loch na Cuilce on the Isle of Skye
- Coordinates: 57°11′50″N 06°09′30″W
- Type: Sea loch
- Primary inflows: Scavaig River
- Surface elevation: 0 m (0 ft)

Loch na Cuilce is a tidal sea loch and sheltered marine inlet located on the south coast of the Isle of Skye in the Scottish Highlands. It forms an inner arm of the larger sea loch Loch Scavaig, situated directly beneath the rugged granitic and gabbro peaks of the Cuillin range.

== Etymology ==
The name Loch na Cuilce translates from Scottish Gaelic as "Loch of the Reed" (cuilc meaning reed or cane), pointing to the wetland vegetation found in sheltered pockets around its tidal margins, despite its otherwise stark, rock-dominated setting.

== Geography and hydrography ==
The loch serves as the marine terminus for the short Scavaig River, which discharges the freshwater outflow of Loch Coruisk over a rocky barrier into the tidal saltwaters. While functionally treated as a distinct inner marine inlet or cove, cartographically it forms the northwestern head of Loch Scavaig. Because the 300-metre-long Scavaig River empties directly into the loch from Loch Coruisk, Loch na Cuilce experiences sharp salinity gradients. During heavy mountain spates, a massive volume of cold, peaty freshwater overrides the denser marine saltwater layer entering from the Sea of the Hebrides.

Because of its protected anchorage beneath Sgùrr na Strì, the shore adjacent to Loch na Cuilce functions as a key landing stage for seasonal passenger boats operating from Elgol, ferrying hillwalkers and climbers visiting the Coruisk basin and the main Cuillin ridge.

== Wildlife & marine habitat ==
The rocky islets and skerries within and around the loch provide a natural habitat and regular haul-out site for populations of common and grey seals.

Loch na Cuilce images
Unnamed island in Loch na Cuilce

Landing at Loch na Cuilce

Seals in Loch na Cuilce
