= Druimindarroch =

Coordinates: 56.89241°N 5.80027°W

Druimindarroch: Scottish Gaelic: Druim nan Darach
- Location within the Lochaber area
- OS grid reference: NM686843
- Council area: Highland
- Country: Scotland
- Sovereign state: United Kingdom
- Post town: Arisaig
- Postcode district: PH39 4
- Police: Scotland
- Fire: Scottish
- Ambulance: Scottish

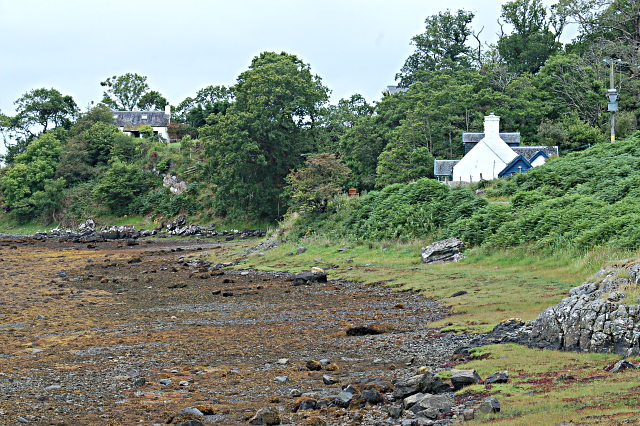
Druimindarroch from the boat shed.

Druimindarroch (Scottish Gaelic: Druim nan Darach) is a small settlement which lies on the north coast of Loch nan Uamh in Lochaber, Scottish Highlands and is in the council area of Highland.

Prince Charlies Cave where Charles Edward Stuart is said to have sheltered in the cave for 5 days in 1746, when on the run after defeat at the Battle of Culloden, is nearby.
