= Spate =

Spate is a surname, and may refer to:

- Clive Spate (born 1952), British game show contestant
- Oskar Spate (1911–2000), geographer
- Virginia Spate (1937–2022), Australian art historian
- Ute Späte (born 1961), German chess master

Spate may also refer to a flood.

== See also ==
- Pate (disambiguation)
- Spade (disambiguation)
- Spat (disambiguation)
