= Prince Charlie's Cave =

Coordinates: 56.89364°N 5.7937°W

There are many Prince Charlies Caves in the Highlands, caves where Charles Edward Stuart was said to have sheltered when on the run from the Duke of Cumberland, after the defeat at the Battle of Culloden. There is one such cave supposedly located on Meilchan, a small green hillock, overlooking Loch nan Uamh in Druimindarroch in Inverness-shire, Scotland. However, there have been many other possible locations suggested. Another cave which Bonnie Prince Charlie stayed in with Ewen MacPherson of Cluny for two weeks in September of 1746 before his final departure for France on 20 September was located around Ben Alder, for which several actual locations have been suggested. There are at least two such caves in South Uist, in Gleann Corghadail and to the north of Beinn Ruigh Choinnich, with a third possible in Èiseabhal.

== Gallery ==
Prince Charlie's Cave

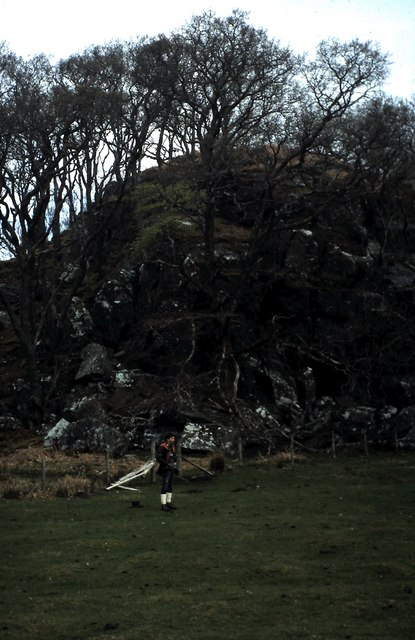
Bonnie Prince Charlie's Cave This is one of the many caves associated with Bonnie Prince Charlie whilst he was a fugitive in the highlands after the Battle of Culloden.

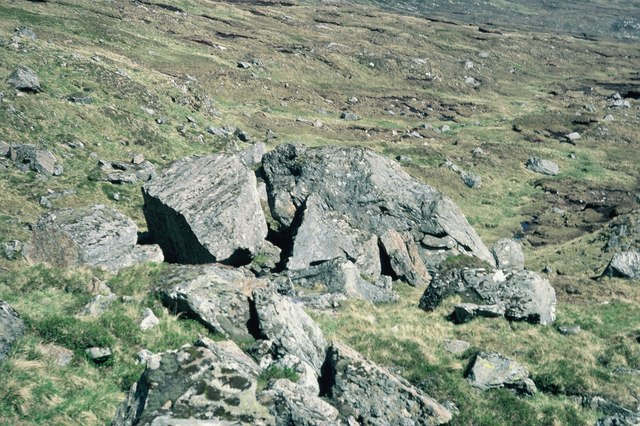
Bonnie Prince Charlie's Cave Whilst a fugitive following Culloden, Charlie was hidden here for several days in the summer of 1746 by the 'Seven Men of GlenMoriston'

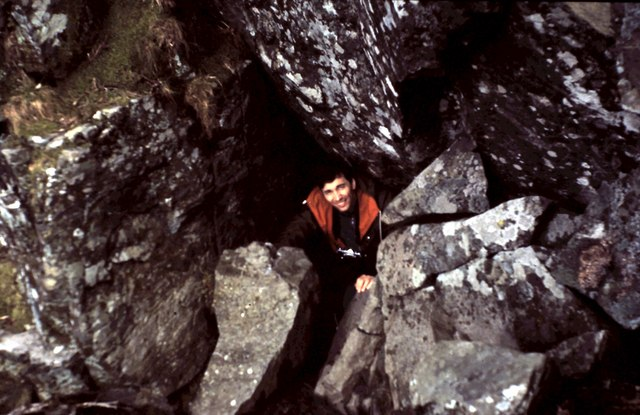
Bonnie Prince Charlie's Cave This is one of the many caves associated with Bonnie Prince Charlie.

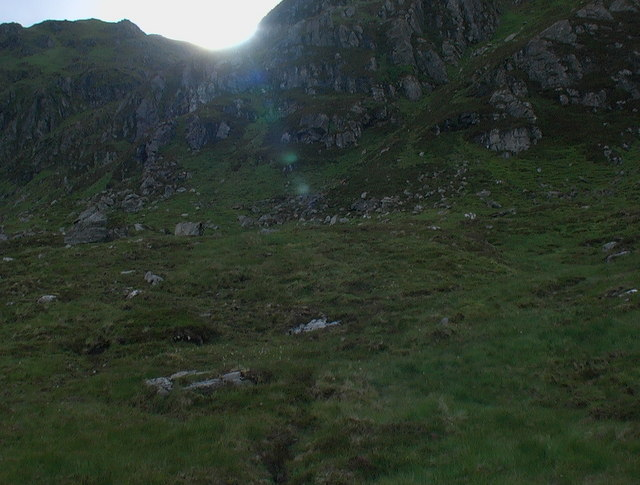
Cliff wall behind Prince Charlie's cave. Charlie's escape route!

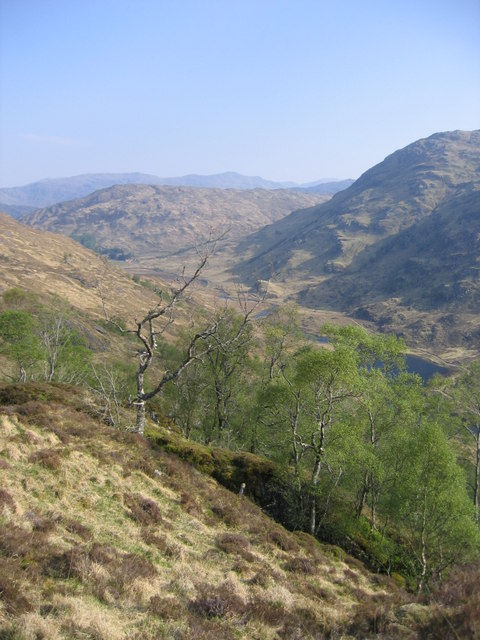
Birch woods above Prince Charlie's cave. Loch Lon a'Ghairt in background. The two paths marked on the map are not clear once over the col. The lower path leads across treacherous ground near the cave. Stay above the trees for an easier descent to the loch.

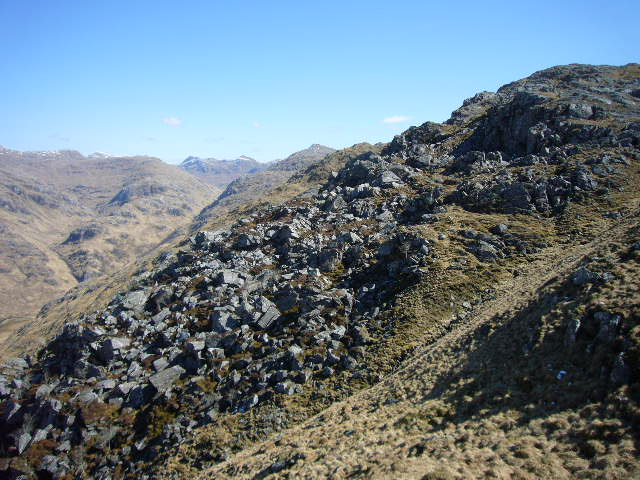
Rock slope failure on Glas-charn Glas-charn is a 600m rugged hill above Loch Beoraid.
