= Sidney Richard Percy =

English painter (1822–1886)

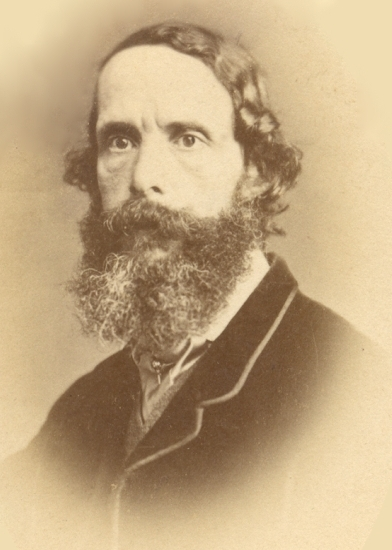
Sidney Richard Percy

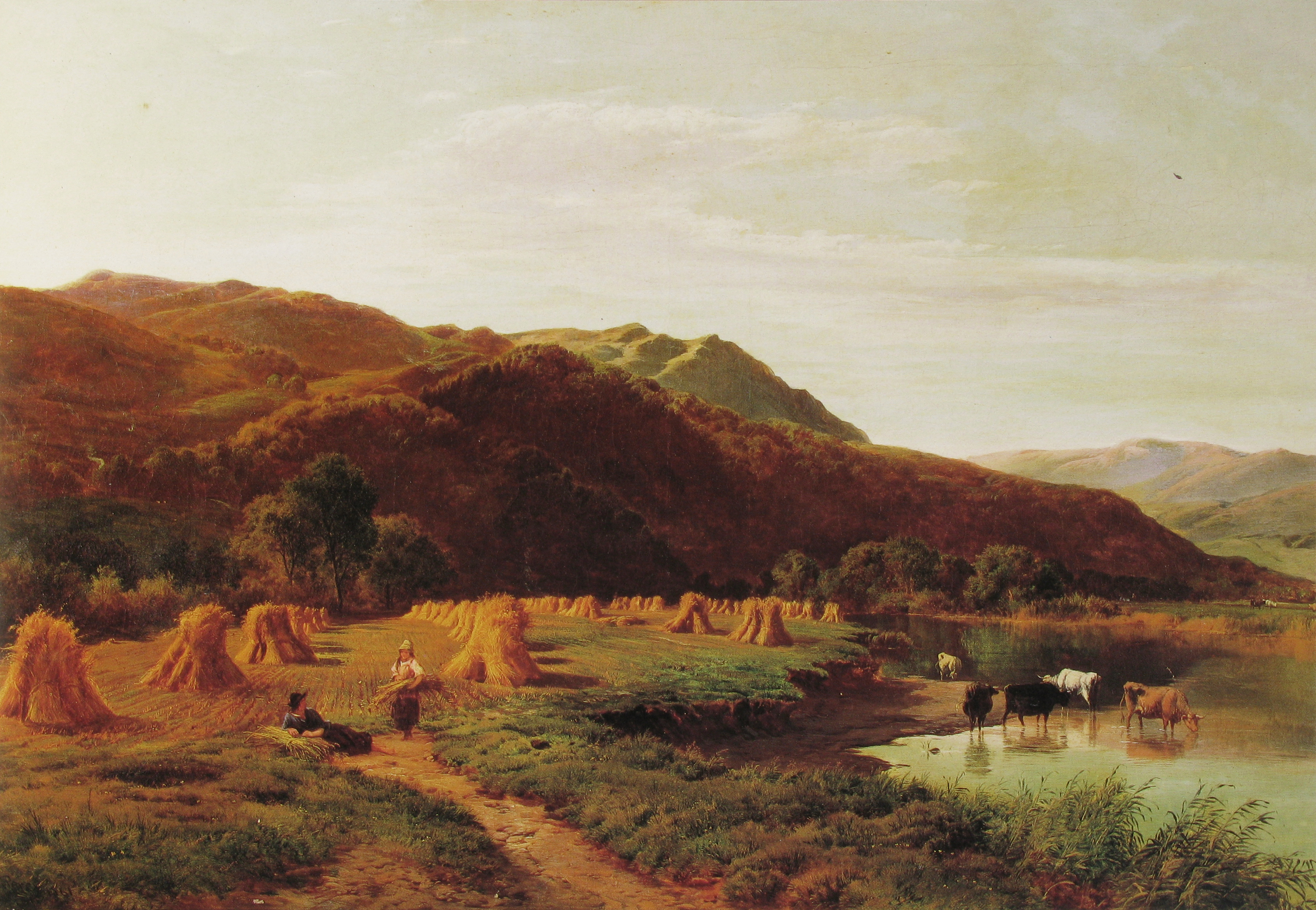
Corn Stooks in a Mountain River Landscape

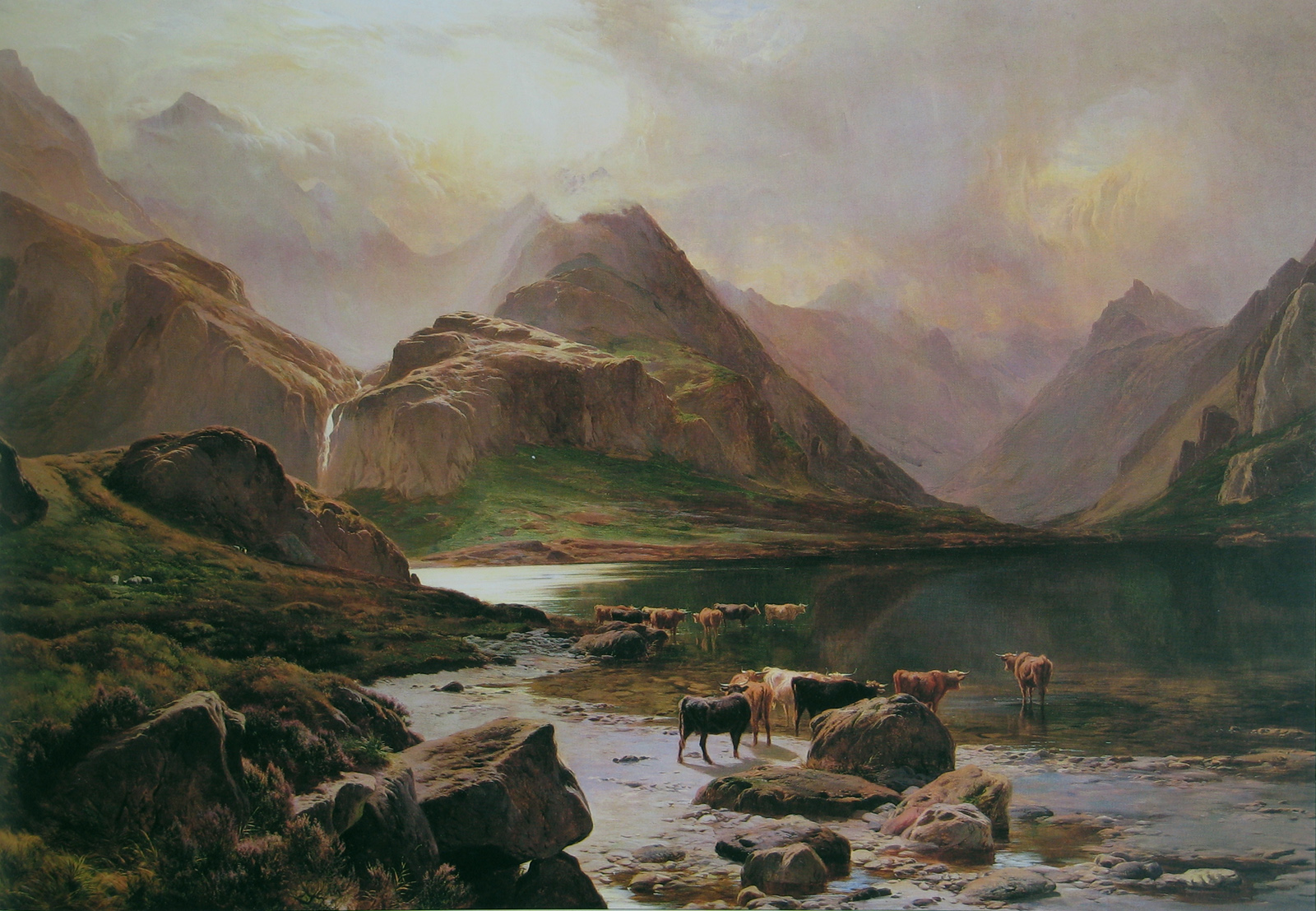
Loch Coruisk, Isle of Skye, Scotland, 1874

Sidney Richard Percy (22 March 1822 – 13 April 1886) was an English landscape painter during the Victorian era, and a member of the Williams family of painters.

== Biography ==
=== Life and career ===
Sidney Richard Percy was born Sidney Richard Percy Williams on 22 March 1822 in London. He was the fifth son of the painter Edward Williams (1781–1855) and Ann Hildebrandt (c.1780-1851), and a member of the Williams family of painters, who were related to such famous artists as James Ward, R.A. and George Morland. His father was a well-known landscape artist, who taught him how to paint; otherwise he received no formal instruction. Although his early paintings were signed "Sidney Williams", he used the name "Percy" from the age of 20 onwards to differentiate himself from the other artists in his family. Starting in 1842, he exhibited at the Royal Academy (65 works), the British Institution (48 works), and the Suffolk Street Gallery of the Society of British Artists (67 works). He also exhibited in many of the lesser-known Victorian art venues as well.

His early years were spent in or near the artist's quarter of Tottenham Court, before moving about 1846 with his family to Barnes on the outskirts of London. Here he lived and worked with his father and brothers in a communal artist setting in a large house with a studio that they shared at 32 Castelnau Villas. Barnes today is part of the urban sprawl of London, but much of it was rural countryside in Victorian times. Situated close to the Thames River, there were quiet marshes beneath windmills, farms where horses pulled plows, and wheel-rutted dirt roads running past country inns or through shaded glens. These were the scenes that the Williams brothers captured on canvas during their early years as painters, but as Sidney Richard Percy matured as a landscape painter he increasingly sought his inspiration in Northern Wales, Devon, Yorkshire, the Lake District and Skye.

He moved after his 1857 marriage to the Florence Villas on Inner Park Road in Wandsworth, Surrey, and then moved his family about 1863 to Hill House in the village of Great Missenden, Buckinghamshire. Hill House was well placed for painting forays into the English countryside, situated as it was across from the Misbourne Valley. He was extremely popular during these years, which brought him sufficient income to indulge the extravagant tastes of his wife, which included a carriage and several servants.

Percy traveled in 1865 to Venice with his friend and neighbor the water colour artist William Callow (1812–1908), and returned visiting Switzerland and Paris. Although war between Prussia and Austria in 1866 put an end to these travels, he returned home to ample artistic inspiration in the Welsh countryside, where he spent many days painting in and around the villages of Llanbedr and Arthog, on either side of the Mawddach estuary in Merioneth. He also made painting forays to the Scottish Highlands.

He spent his final years at 34 Mulgrave Road in Sutton, Surrey, where his knee was injured when he was thrown from a horse in a riding accident. When his leg had to be amputated as a consequence, he died prematurely on 13 April 1886 at his home of a heart attack due complications from the operation. He was buried at Beckenham Cemetery in Kent. Though once quite wealthy, his finances at the time of his death were no longer robust, and his widow had to be supported in her final years by her son-in-law.

=== Marriage and children ===
Sidney Richard Percy Williams married Emily Charlotte Fairlam (1835–1904), the daughter of Richard Fairlam, on 30 June 1857 in the Barnes Parish Church. He and Emily had four children.

1. Gordon Fairlam Percy Williams (12 April 1858, Wandsworth, Surrey − 12 Sept 1870, Westhampnett, West Sussex)
2. Edith Maude Percy Williams (14 April 1859, Wandsworth, Surrey − 1883, Epsom, Surrey)
3. Amy Dora Percy Williams (6 October 1860, Wandsworth, Surrey − 11 June 1957, Grange-over-Sands, Cumbria)
4. Herbert Sidney Percy Williams (18 Feb 1863, Great Missenden, Buckinghamshire − 8 Oct 1932, Hammersmith, London)

Sidney Richard Percy's daughter Amy Dora Percy exhibited one painting at the Royal Academy, and married the chemist Richard Freshfield Reynolds (1860–1907), but she is best known for a collection of poems and several novels she wrote as Mrs. Fred Reynolds. Her brother Herbert Sidney Percy (1863–1932) studied at the Royal Academy of Art, where he won two silver medals in painting, and exhibited one painting at the Academy. He became a professional artist whose portraits and miniatures hang in the homes of many prominent English families. He also painted landscapes, and illustrated books, particularly those of his close friend G.K. Chesterton.

=== The Williams family ===
Sidney Richard Percy was born into an artist family that is sometimes referred to as the Barnes School. His father and five surviving brothers (listed below) were all noted landscape painters during the Victorian era. Percy was one of three of the sons of Edward Williams who changed their last names to protect the identity of their art.

- Edward Williams (father)
- Edward Charles Williams
- Henry John Boddington
- George Augustus Williams
- Arthur Gilbert
- Alfred Walter Williams

== Art ==
=== Influence ===
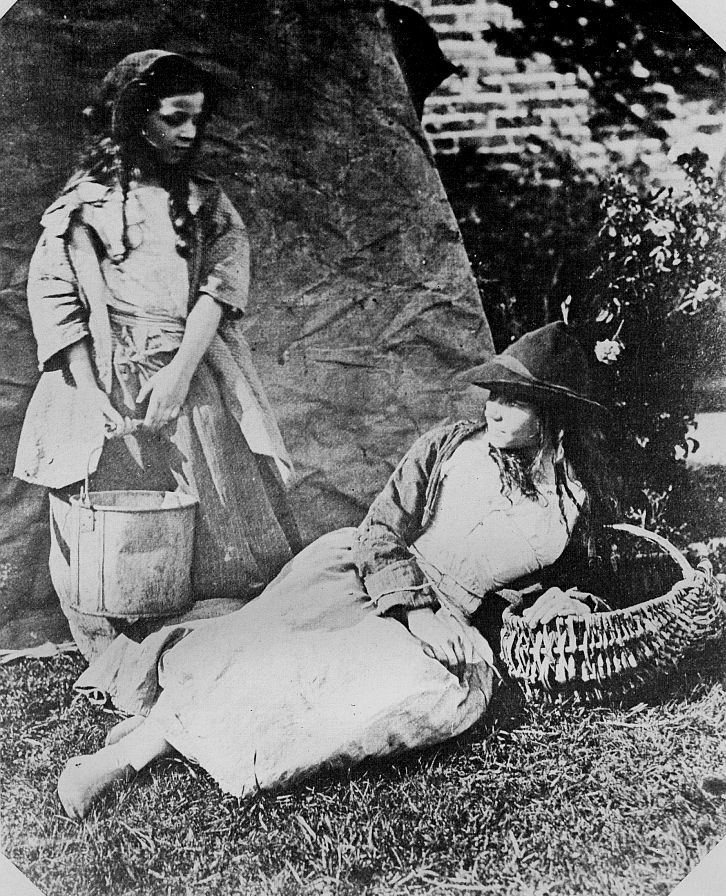
An S R Percy photograph of two gypsy girls in the Barnes Common that he included in some of his landscapes

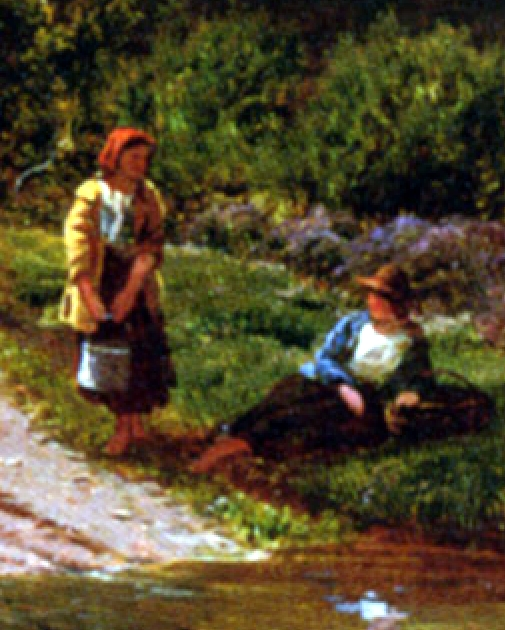
A detail from A rest on the roadside, 1861 showing the same gypsy girls as in one of S R Percy's photographs

Sidney Richard Percy had his greatest success painting landscapes of grazing cattle, typically set against backgrounds of distant mountains and cloudy skies. The prevailing hues of his landscapes are earth tones and soft greens, accentuated by a variety of pastel hues. The detail in his work is part of its appeal, and "it was remarked that his rocks and stones were sufficiently accurate to have served as illustrations to the writings of Sir Roderick Murchison, the popular 19th-century geologist." Llyn-y-Ddinas, North Wales, one of his more popular works on the internet, displays these qualities. He also painted landscapes of farm fields, wheel-rutted country roads, and the occasional boat scene on a lake.

His art interests were not limited to painting, and he was also an amateur photographer, in a day when photography was new and exciting, yet still a poorly understood medium. He frequently used his own photographs of gypsies in the Barnes or Wimbledon Common as the basis for similar figures in his paintings, even though some contemporary critics complained how these figures ruined what otherwise would be delightful landscapes. A classic example is Storm Gathering on Cader Idris, North Wales, which he exhibited in 1856 at the Royal Academy, and which has the same gypsy girls in it as one of seven of his photographs in the Victoria and Albert Museum. In fact, this painting is one of the ones singled out for some of the aforementioned criticism. These same girls appear in his 1861 work A Rest on the Roadside, and they appear again, but reversed, in his 1873 version of Llyn-y-Ddinas, North Wales, showing that he repeated themes when convenient.

Although he generally painted in oils, a number of small watercolors on cardboard exist, typically unsigned, that are his work. The family, and his son the painter Herbert Sidney Percy in particular, referred to these as "potboilers", meaning that they were quickly, and often crudely executed, yet easily and cheaply sold "to put food on the table" when working on larger, more time-consuming oils for exhibition, or commissions. Many of these watercolor "potboilers" were done in the field, and then brought back to the studio to refer to when executing a more formal oil on canvas.

Sidney Richard Percy was extremely popular during the early part of his career, which for a short time brought him a fair amount of income. Among his patrons during this time was Prince Albert the Royal consort who in 1854 gave Percy's landscape of A view of Llyn Dulyn, North Wales, which had just been exhibited at the Royal Academy, as a gift to his wife Queen Victoria. This painting still hangs today in the Royal Collection. Unfortunately Sidney Richard Percy outlived his popularity, and the art world was more excited about impressionism and other styles than landscapes when he died. Today though, his work is much sought after, and his better paintings bring much higher prices in auction than any of those of his brethren in the Williams family. However, a drop in demand over recent decades for Victorian landscapes has been reported. This is illustrated by the Percy oil painting ‘’Loch Lomond’’. It was sold for £35,200 at Christie’s (London) Victorian Pictures sale on 2 June 1989, followed by £70,000 on 6 October 1993 at an English gallery. In contrast the most recent price was £17,700 on 10 January 2018 at Stroud’s Auction Rooms (Gloucester, UK).

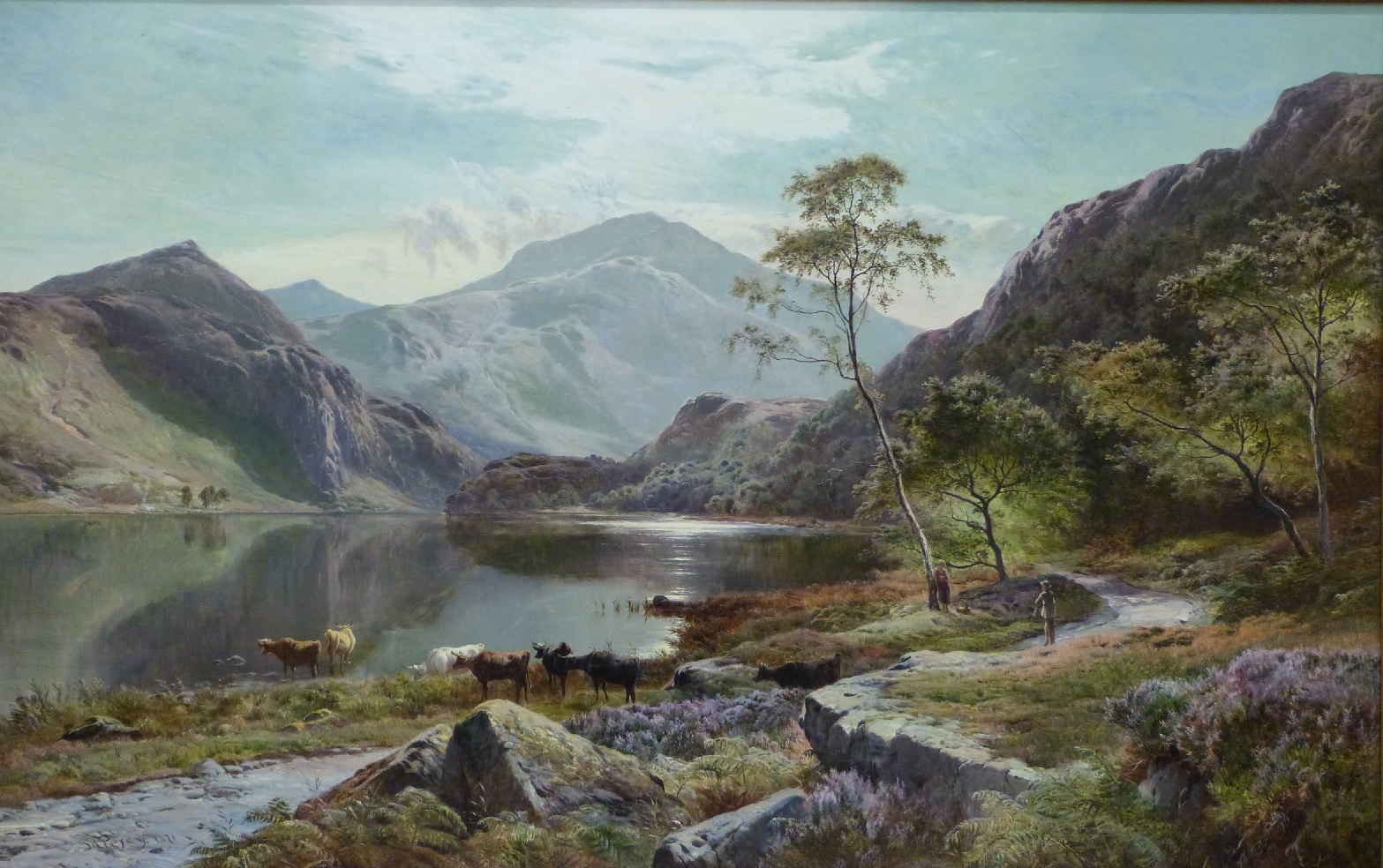
Loch Lomond. Oil on canvas. Signed S.R. Percy and dated 1871.

When the Athenaeum in 1886 (i. 592) ran an obituary for Sidney Richard Percy they called him, "the well-known and popular painter, founder of the so-called School of Barnes . . ." Although depending on the context of what is meant by the so-called Barnes School, this is a bit of an injustice to his father Edward Williams, whom it might be argued is the founder of the Barnes School of painters, but it illustrates the popularity that Sidney Richard Percy held with the art-buying public of his day.

=== Paintings ===
Some further examples of his work (arranged chronologically).

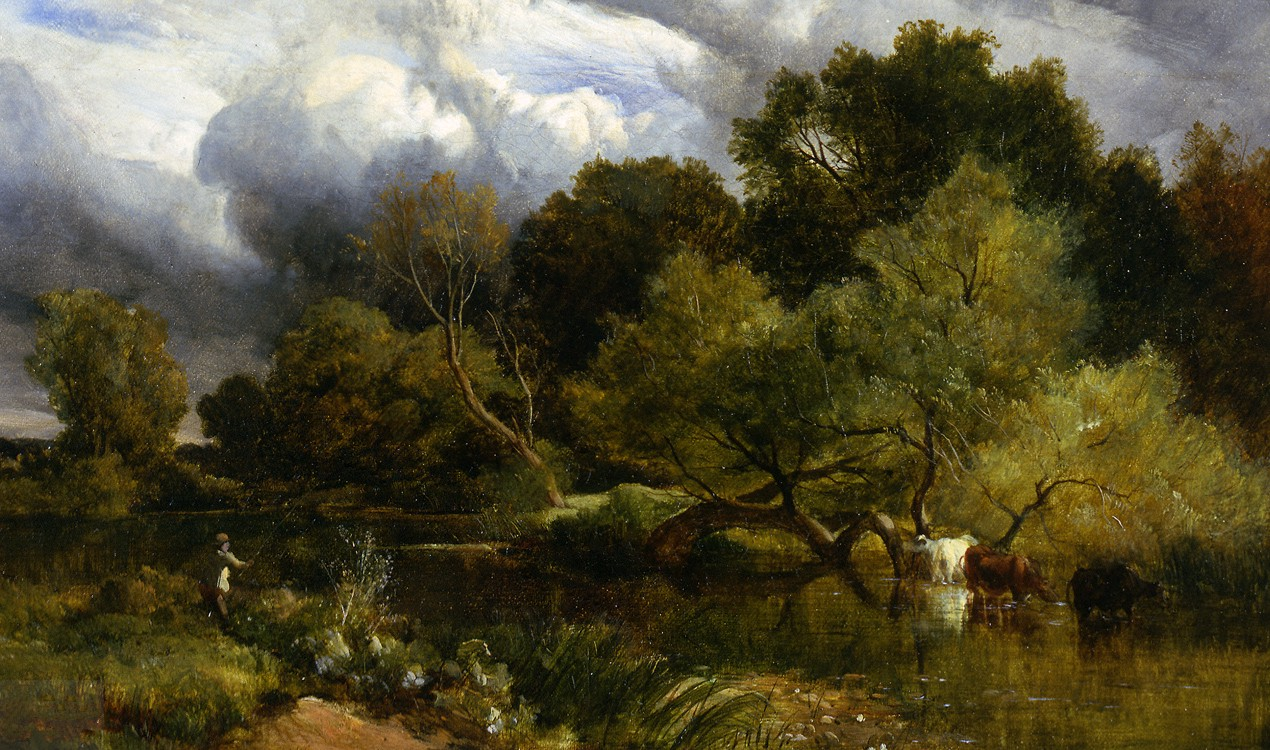
The Angler's Corner, 1851

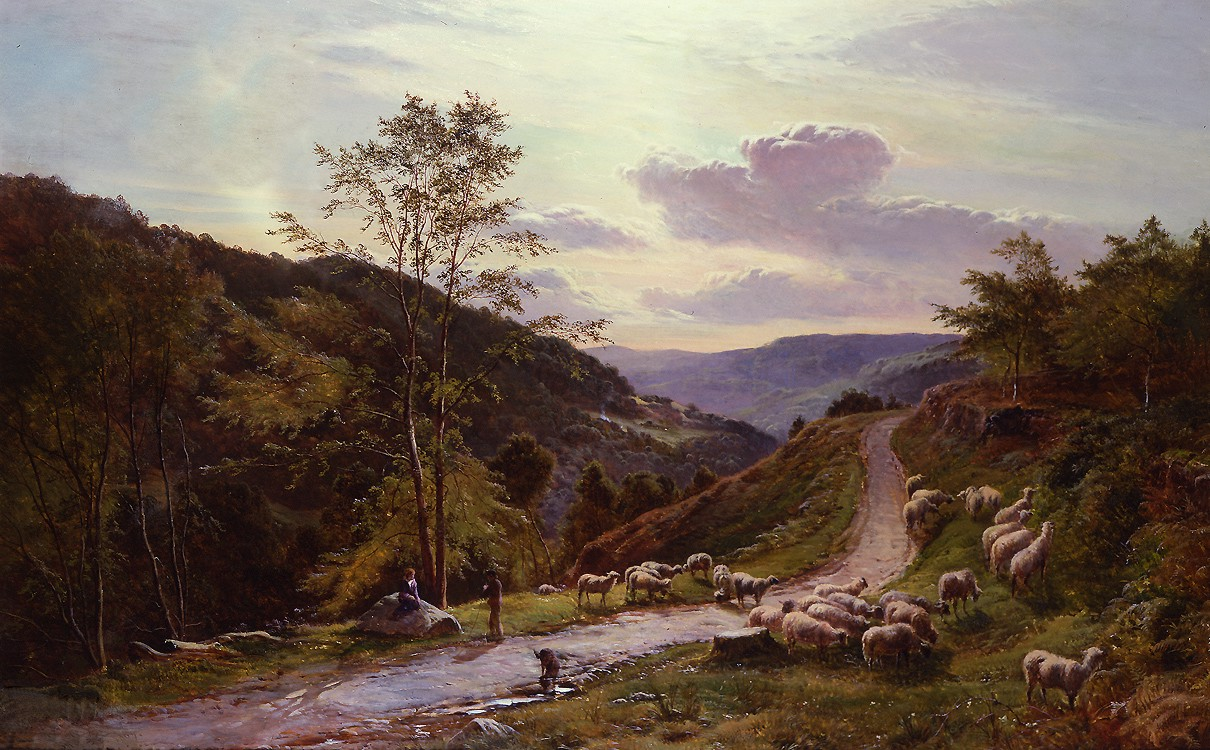
Near Bettwys-y-Coed, 1869

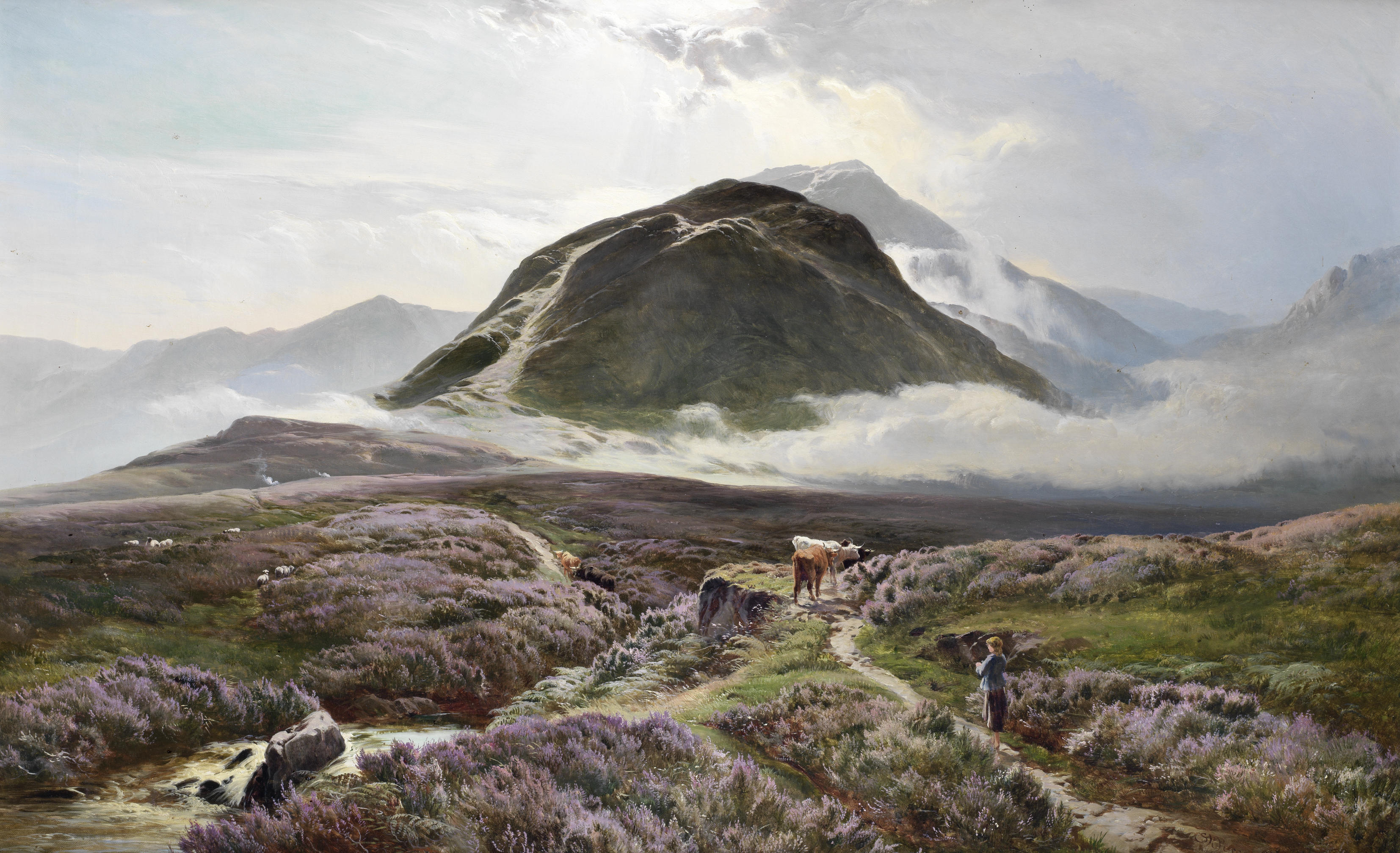
Carn Dearg and Ben Nevis from Achintee, 1874

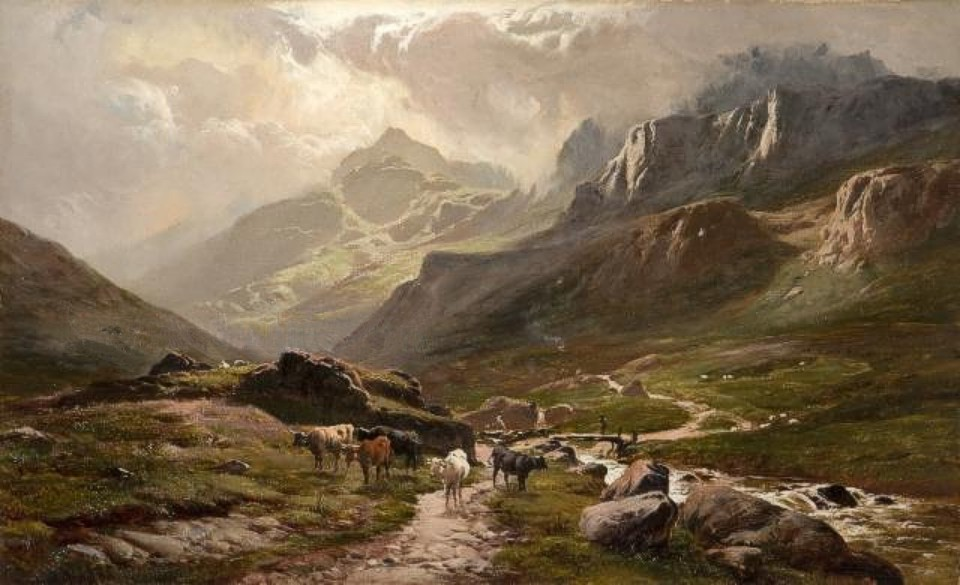
Grizedale, Westmorland, 1883

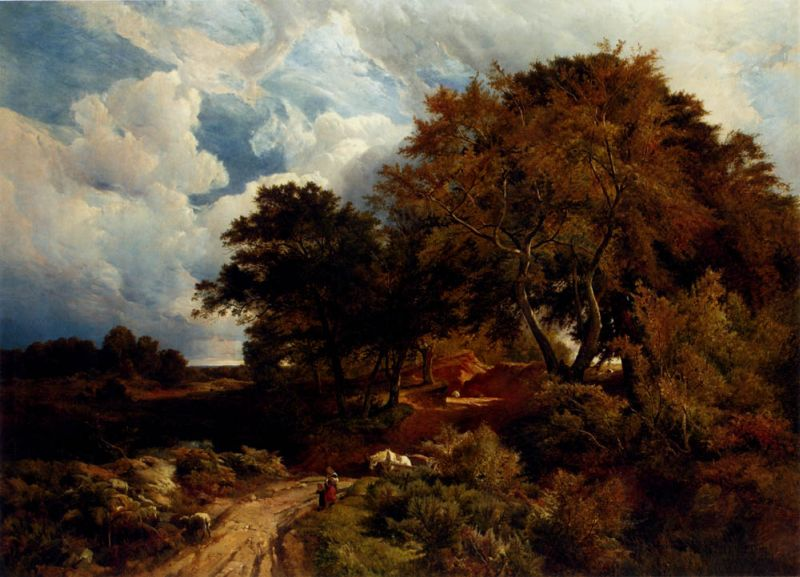
The road across the Common, 1851

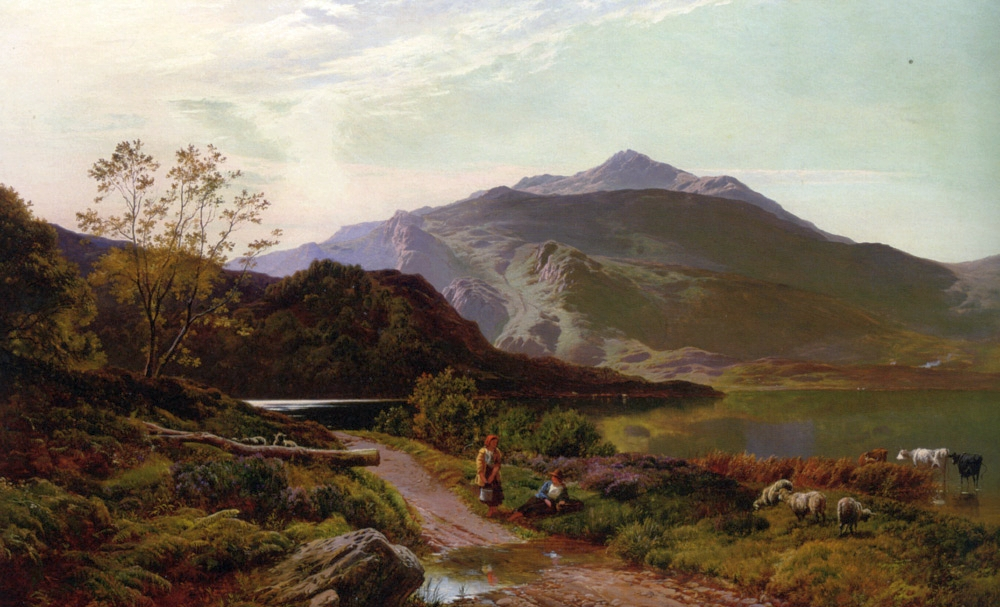
A rest on the roadside, 1861

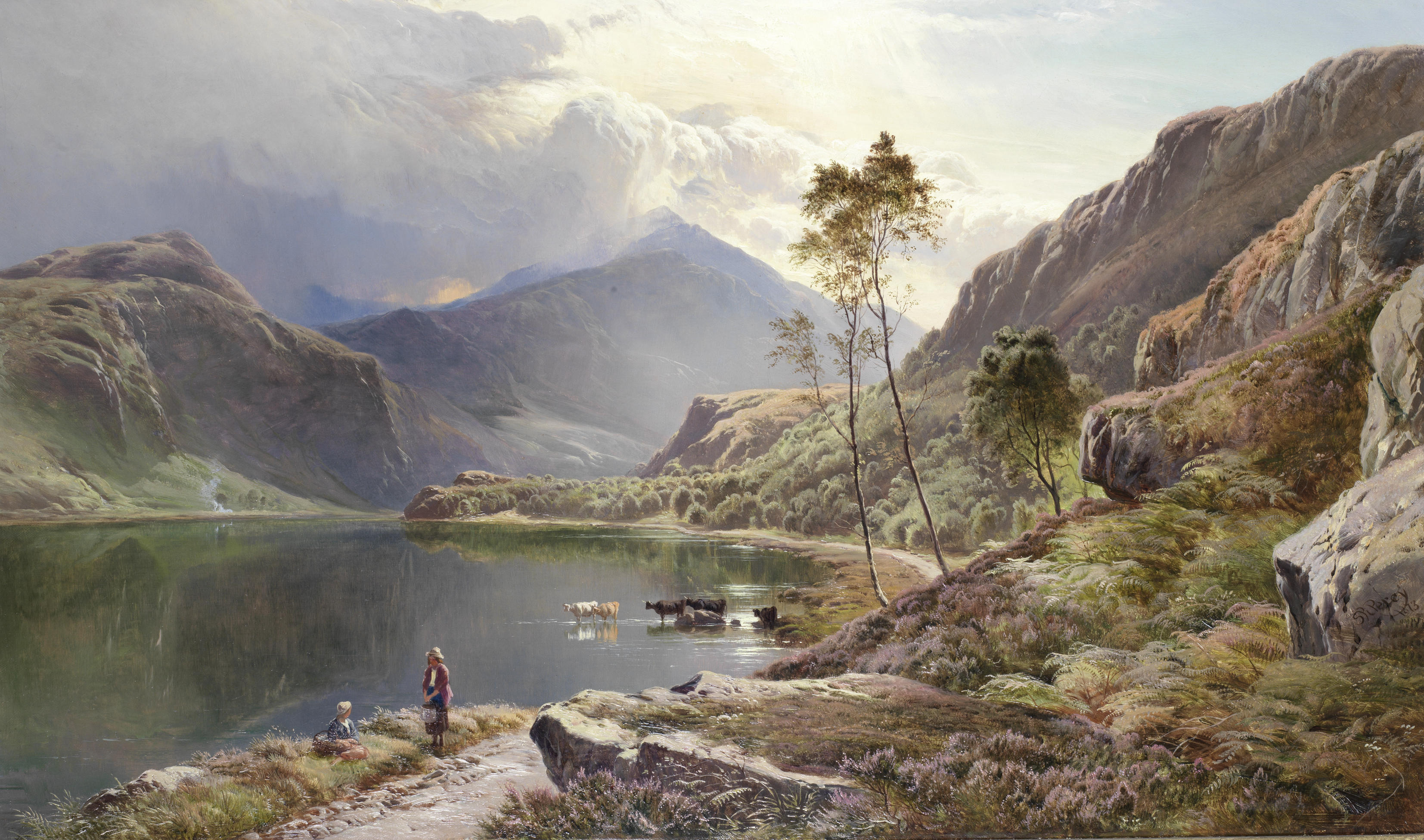
Llyn-y-Ddinas, North Wales, 1873

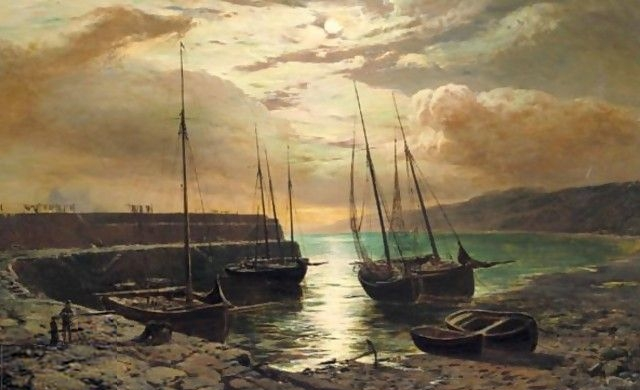
Loch Scavaig, Isle of Skye, 1883

=== Museums ===
- Museum and Art Gallery, Salford, England
- Castle Museum and Art Gallery, Nottingham, England
- Collection of Her Majesty the Queen, (Osborne House on the Isle of Wight), England
- Ferens Art Gallery, Kingston-upon-Hull, England (two paintings)
- Montreal Museum of Fine Arts, Montreal, Canada
- Maharaja Fateh Singh Museum, Baroda, India (two paintings)
- Mappin Art Gallery, Sheffield, England
- Muscarelle Museum of Art, Williamsburg, Virginia, United States
- Metropolitan Museum of Art, New York, United States
- Museum and Art Gallery, Sunderland, England
- National Museum of Wales, Cardiff, Wales
- New Walk Museum, Leicester, England (two paintings)
- Tate Gallery, London, England
- Temple Newsam House, Leeds, England
- Victoria Art Gallery, Bath, England (2 paintings)
- Wolverhampton Art Gallery, West Midlands, England
