= Loch Coruisk =

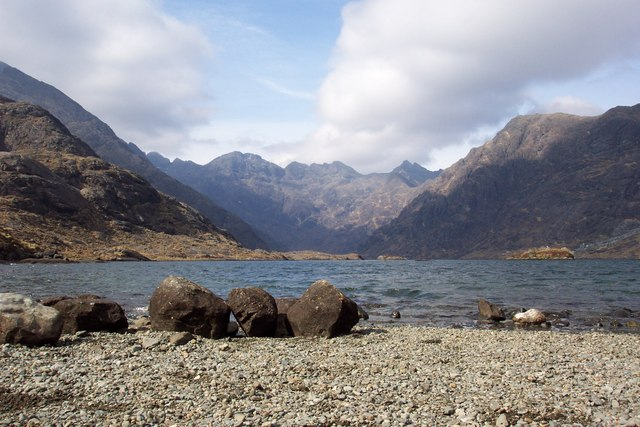

- Location within Highland
- Location: Isle of Skye, Highlands, Scotland
- Coordinates: 57.2074°N 6.1690°W
- Type: freshwater loch
- Primary inflows: Coruisk River, Allt a' Choire Riabhaich
- Primary outflows: Scavaig River
- Basin countries: United Kingdom

Loch Coruisk (Scottish Gaelic: Coire Uisg, meaning the "Cauldron of Waters") is an inland fresh-water loch, lying at the foot of the Black Cuillin in the Isle of Skye, in the Scottish Highlands.

Loch Coruisk is reputed to be the home of a kelpie or water horse, a shape-shifting creature that can assume human form.

== Geography ==
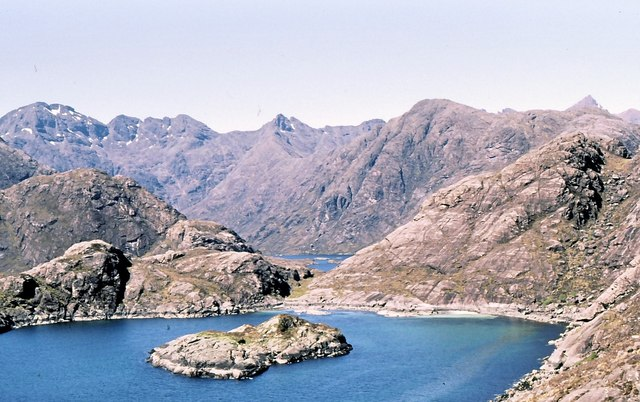
Approaching the Bad Step - geograph.org.uk - 853798

The loch is accessible by boat from Elgol, or on foot from Sligachan (approximately 7–8 miles or 11–13 kilometres distance). It is also possible to walk from Elgol, but one section of the path ("the Bad Step") presents some potential difficulties for the nervous or inexperienced.

The northern end of the loch is ringed by the Black Cuillin, often wreathed in cloud. From the southern end the Scavaig River, only a few hundred yards long, discharges into a sea loch, Loch Scavaig. The loch is nearly 2 miles (3 kilometres) long, but only about 400 yards (370 metres) wide.

== Literature ==
Sir Walter Scott visited the loch in 1814 and described it vividly:

“Rarely human eye has known
A scene so stern as that dread lake,
With its dark ledge of barren stone...”

Lord Tennyson reported more prosaically:

“Loch Coruisk, said to be the wildest scene in the Highlands, I failed in seeing. After a fatiguing expedition over the roughest ground on a wet day we arrived at the banks of the loch, and made acquaintance with the extremest tiptoes of the hills, all else being thick wool-white fog.”

Mark Haddon used the remote location of the loch for a portal in the 1992 children's novel Gridzbi Spudvetch!, re-issued in 2009 as Boom!. A description of the path from Elgol (including a traverse of The Bad Step) is included in the narrative, as is the Memorial Hut.

Robert Macfarlane visited the loch and its valley whilst writing his 2007 travelogue The Wild Places, and a description of the area forms the book's third chapter.

== Art ==
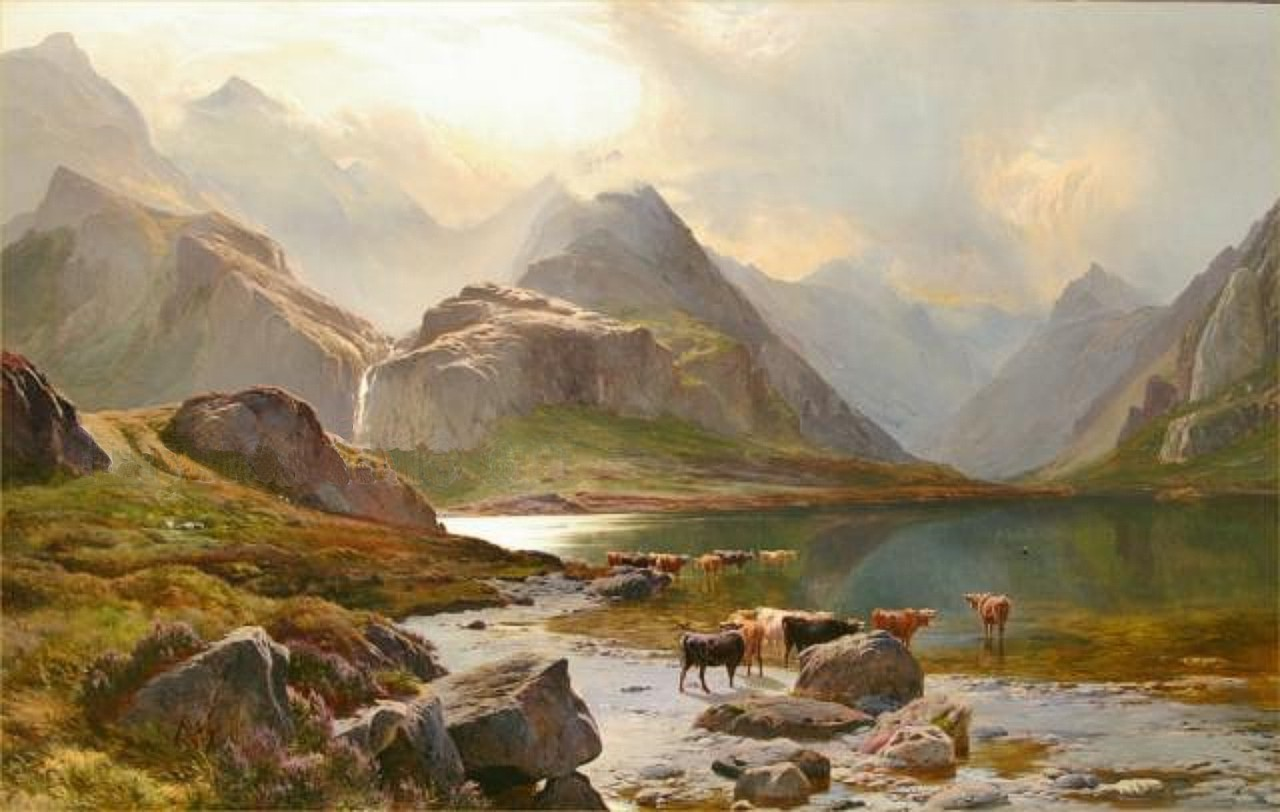
Painting by Sidney Richard Percy

The loch has been painted by, among many others, William Daniell (1769–1837), J. M. W. Turner (1775–1851), Sidney Richard Percy (1821–1886) and Alexander Francis Lydon (1836–1917)
