= Kilmarie =

Coordinates: 57.180969°N 6.052358°W

Kilmarie: Scottish Gaelic: Cill Ma Ruibhe
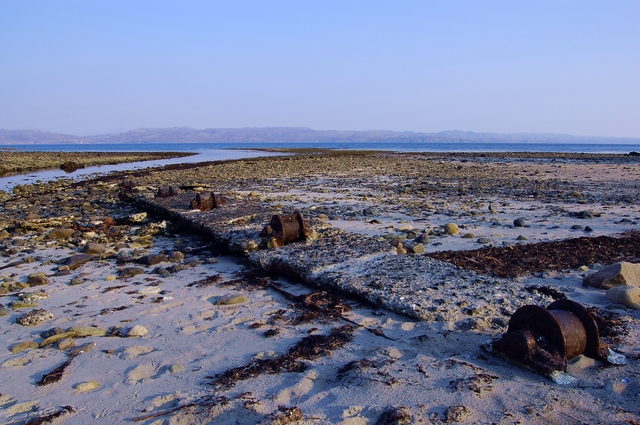
- Kilmarie Beach Evening sun on the beach picks out the rusty wheels of what seems to have been some sort of haulage system

- Location within the Isle of Skye
- OS grid reference: NG552173
- Council area: Highland
- Lieutenancy area: Ross and Cromarty
- Country: Scotland
- Sovereign state: United Kingdom
- Post town: ISLE OF SKYE
- Postcode district: IV45
- Dialling code: 01471
- Police: Scotland
- Fire: Scottish
- Ambulance: Scottish
- UK Parliament: Ross, Skye and Lochaber
- Scottish Parliament: Ross, Skye and Inverness West

Kilmarie or Kilmaree (Scottish Gaelic: Cill Ma Ruibhe), (Gaelic: cill =' church or cell'; marie from St. Maolrubha) is a village in the Isle of Skye, Scotland. Its most notable feature is the village church and graveyard. The graveyard has a significant number of tombstones from highland clans, in particular Clan MacKinnon. Nearby is Kilmarie House, former residence of Jethro Tull member Ian Anderson.

It is also the point of embarkation from Route B8083 to Dun Ringill ruin.

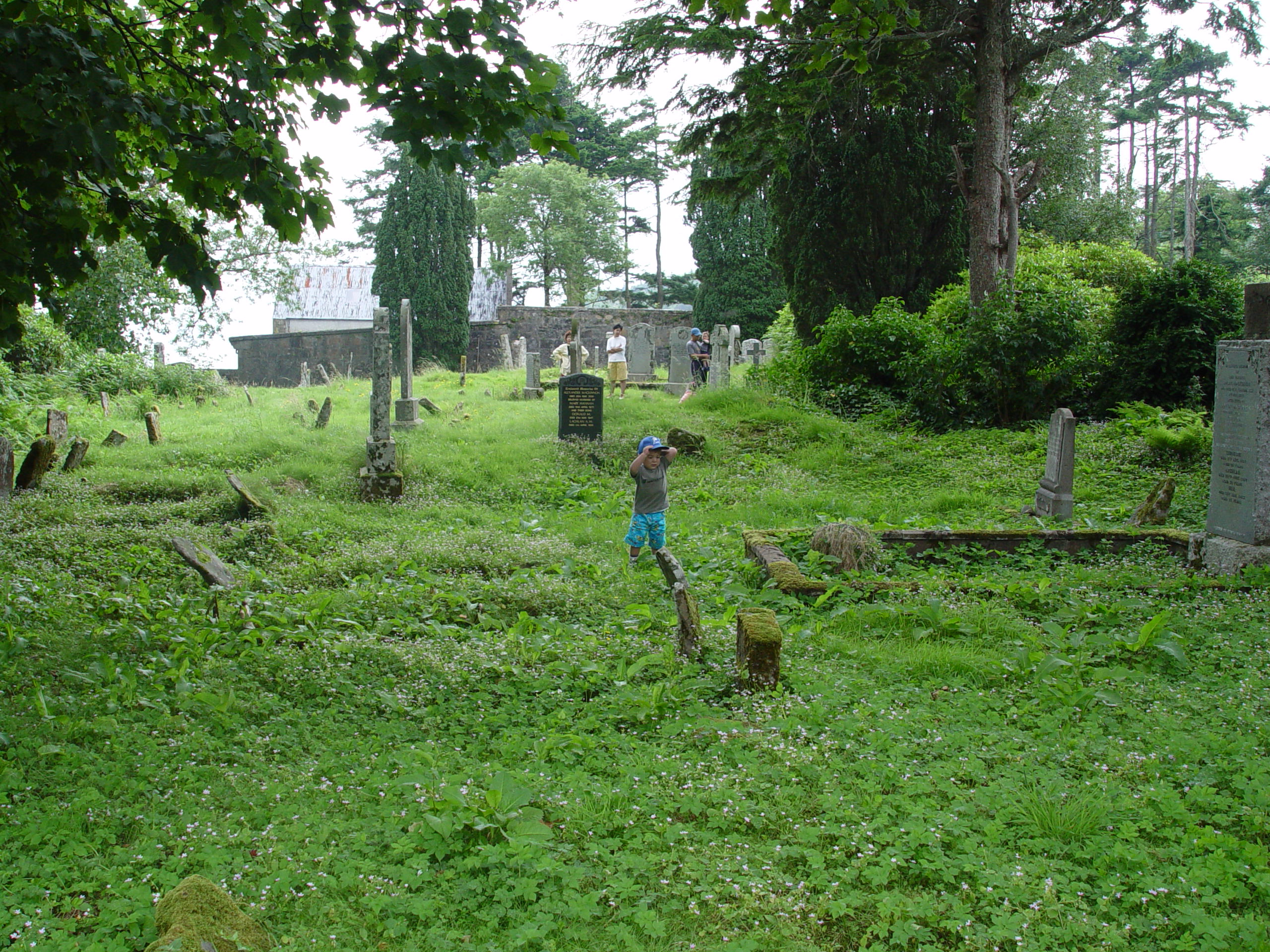
Kilmarie Graveyard
