= Elgol =

Coordinates: 57.152°N 6.098°W

Elgol: Scottish Gaelic: Ealaghol
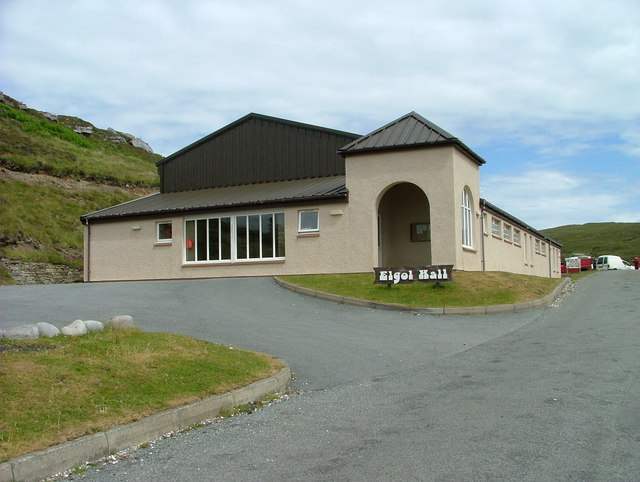
- The village hall in Elgol

- Location within the Isle of Skye
- Area: 101 km^{2} (39 sq mi)
- Population: 168 (2011)
  - Density: 2/km^{2} (5.2/sq mi)
- OS grid reference: NG521142
- Council area: Highland
- Lieutenancy area: Ross and Cromarty
- Country: Scotland
- Sovereign state: United Kingdom
- Post town: ISLE OF SKYE
- Postcode district: IV49
- Dialling code: 01471
- Police: Scotland
- Fire: Scottish
- Ambulance: Scottish
- UK Parliament: Inverness, Skye and West Ross-shire
- Scottish Parliament: Ross, Skye and Inverness West

Elgol (Scottish Gaelic: Ealaghol) is a village on the shores of Loch Scavaig towards the end of the Strathaird peninsula in the Isle of Skye, in the Scottish Highlands.

== Name ==
According to tradition, its name derives from a battle fought with five ships by Aella, a follower of Vortigern, against the Picts and Scots ("Aella-gol").

== History ==
The Strathaird peninsula was historically a heartland of the MacKinnons, a robustly Jacobite clan. On 4 July 1746, the Young Pretender found sanctuary at Elgol in the course of his wanderings under the protection of MacKinnon of MacKinnon and Captain John MacKinnon of Elgol. The cave where he is said to have waited for a boat to the mainland ("Prince Charlie’s cave", or "Uamh Phrionnsa") can still be visited today, a short walk to the south of the village.

== Gallery ==
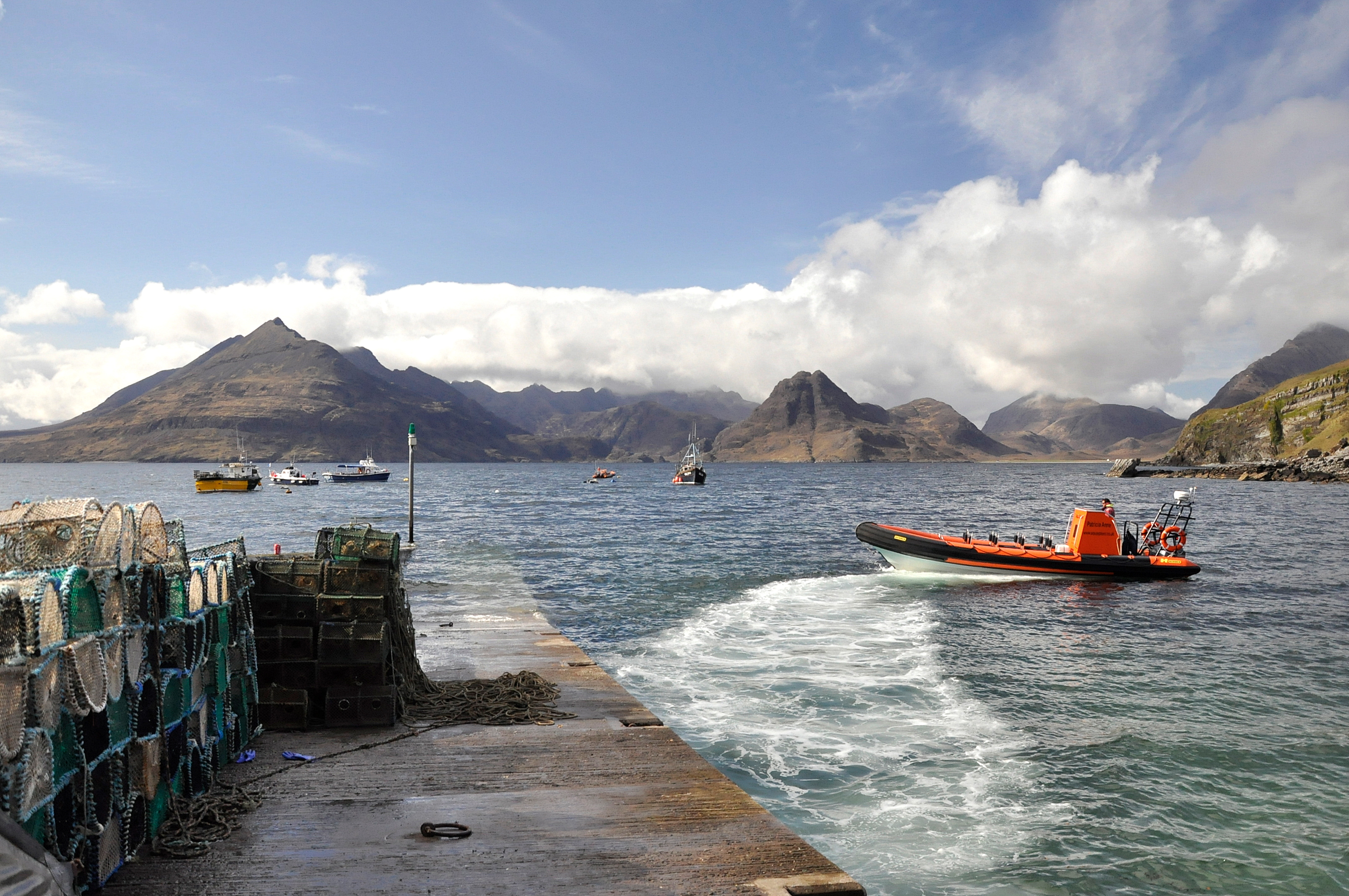
Elgol Bay

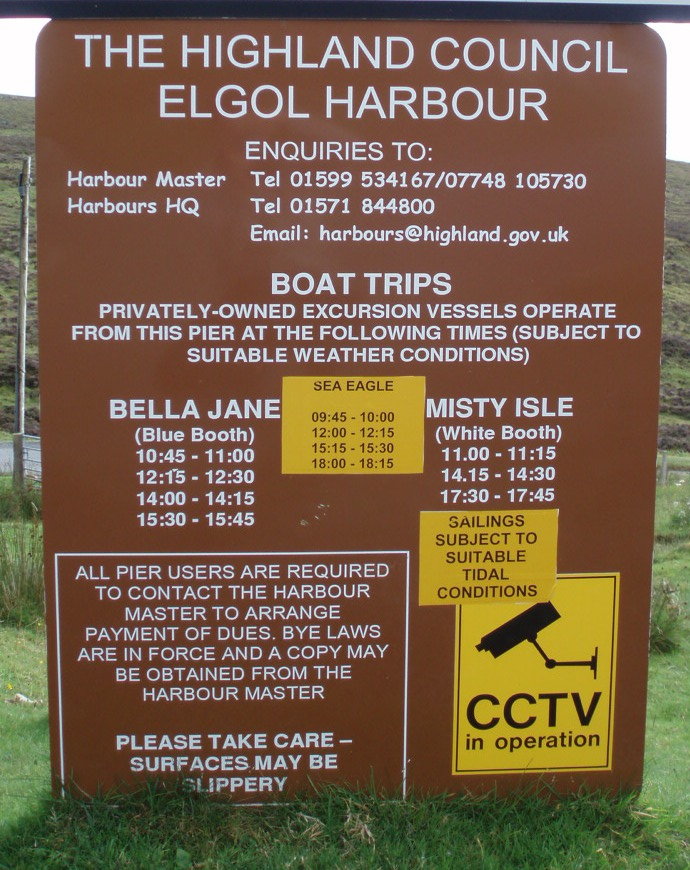
Boat trips from Elgol

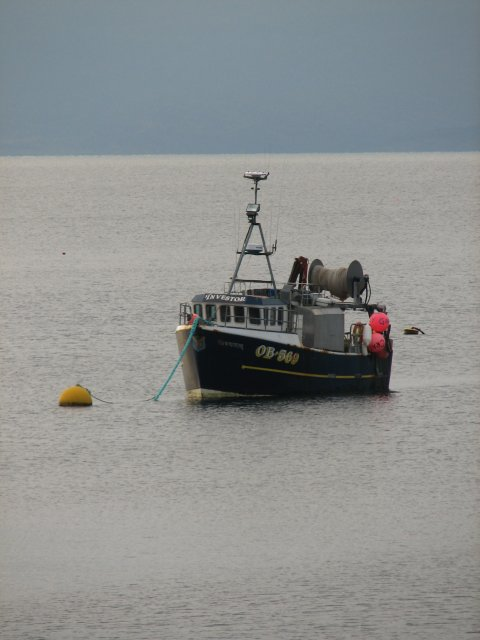
Investor fishing boat in Elgol bay

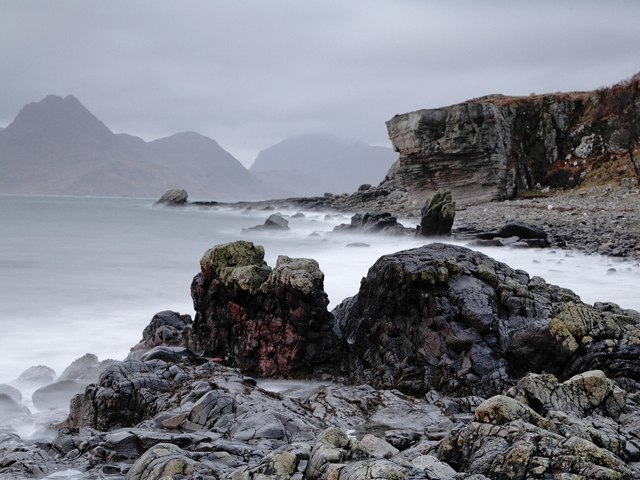
Elgol beach looking north west across Loch Scavaig towards the Cuillin

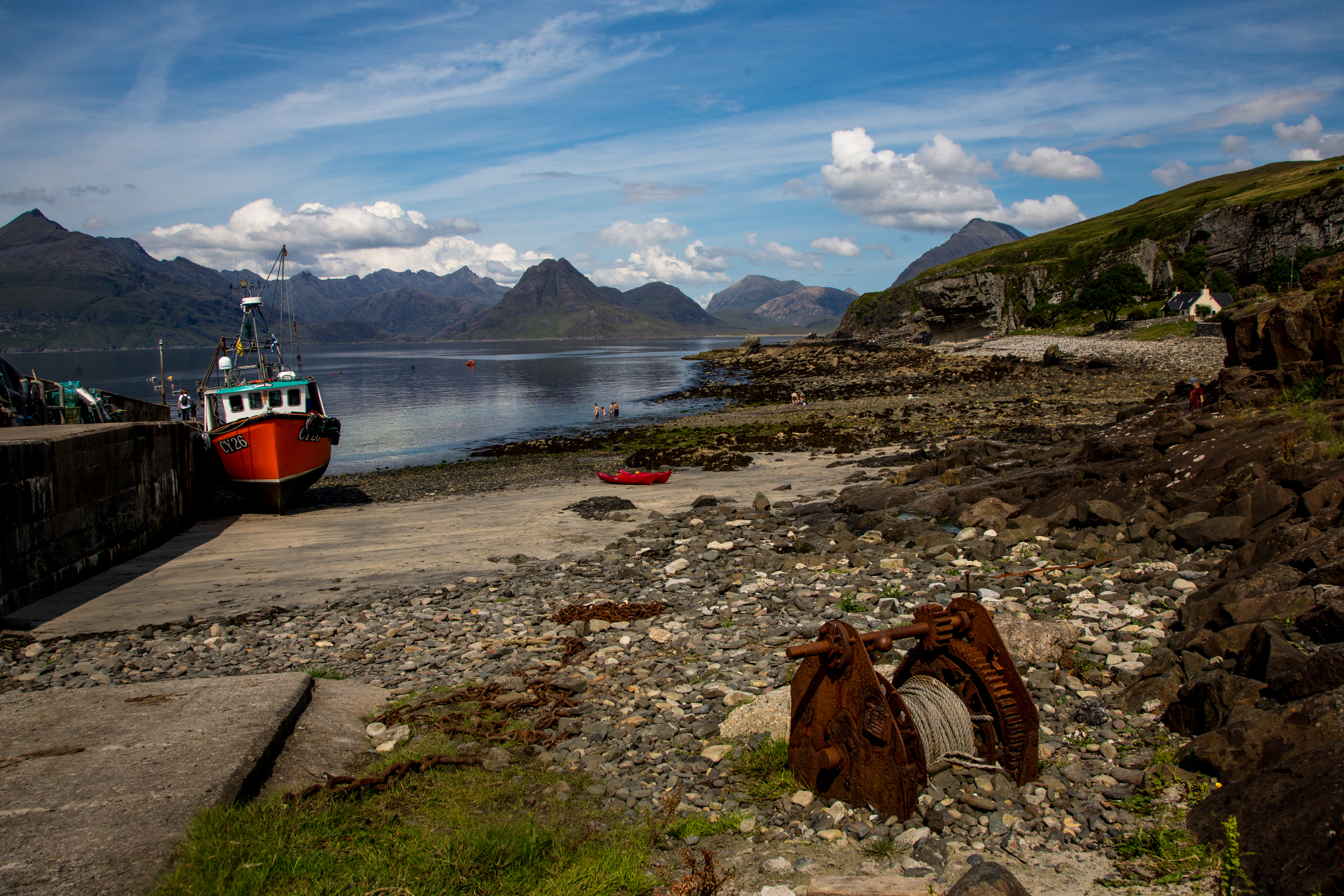
Elgol Bay August 2019

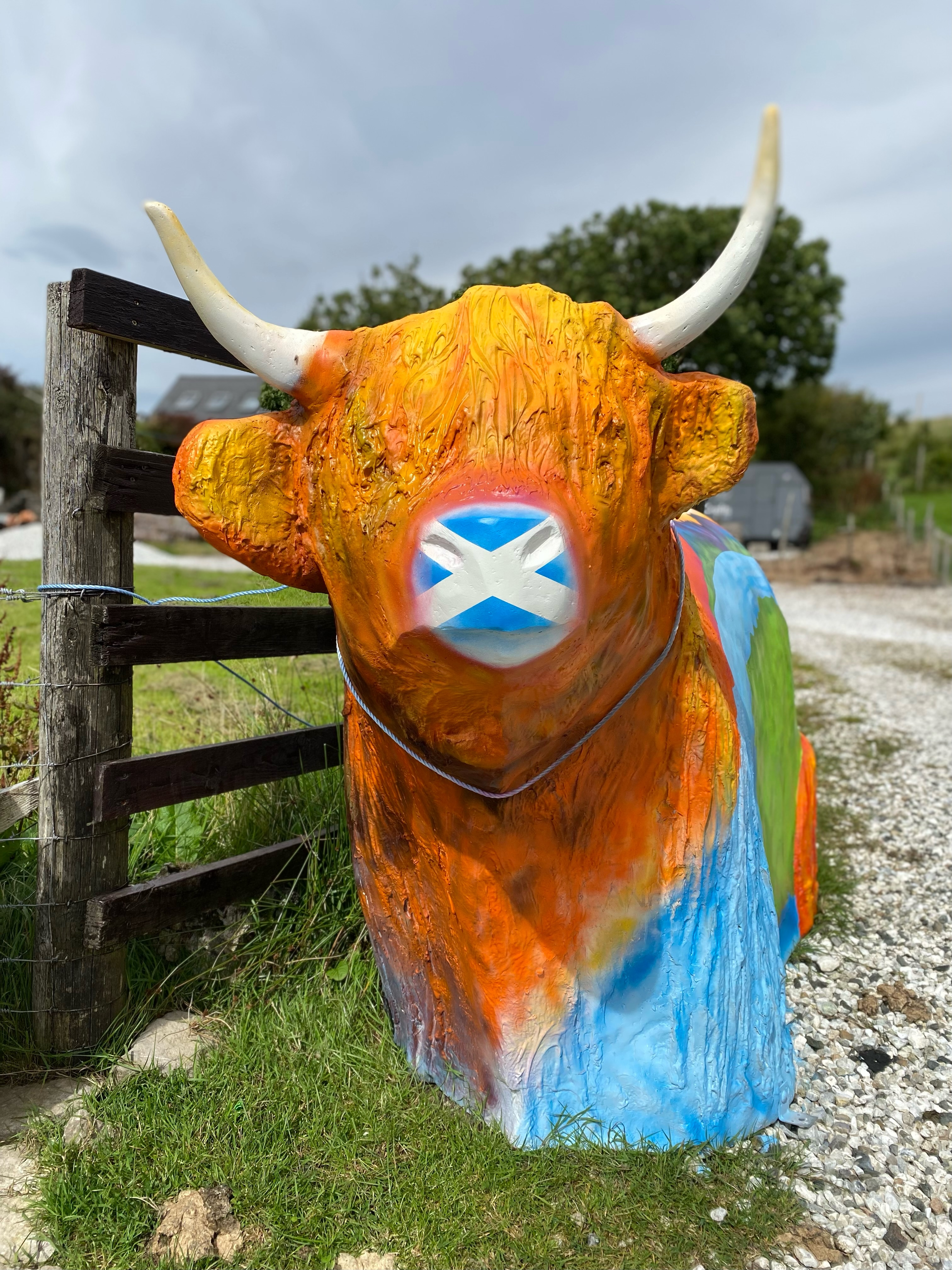
Jazz Buchanan's Highland Cow

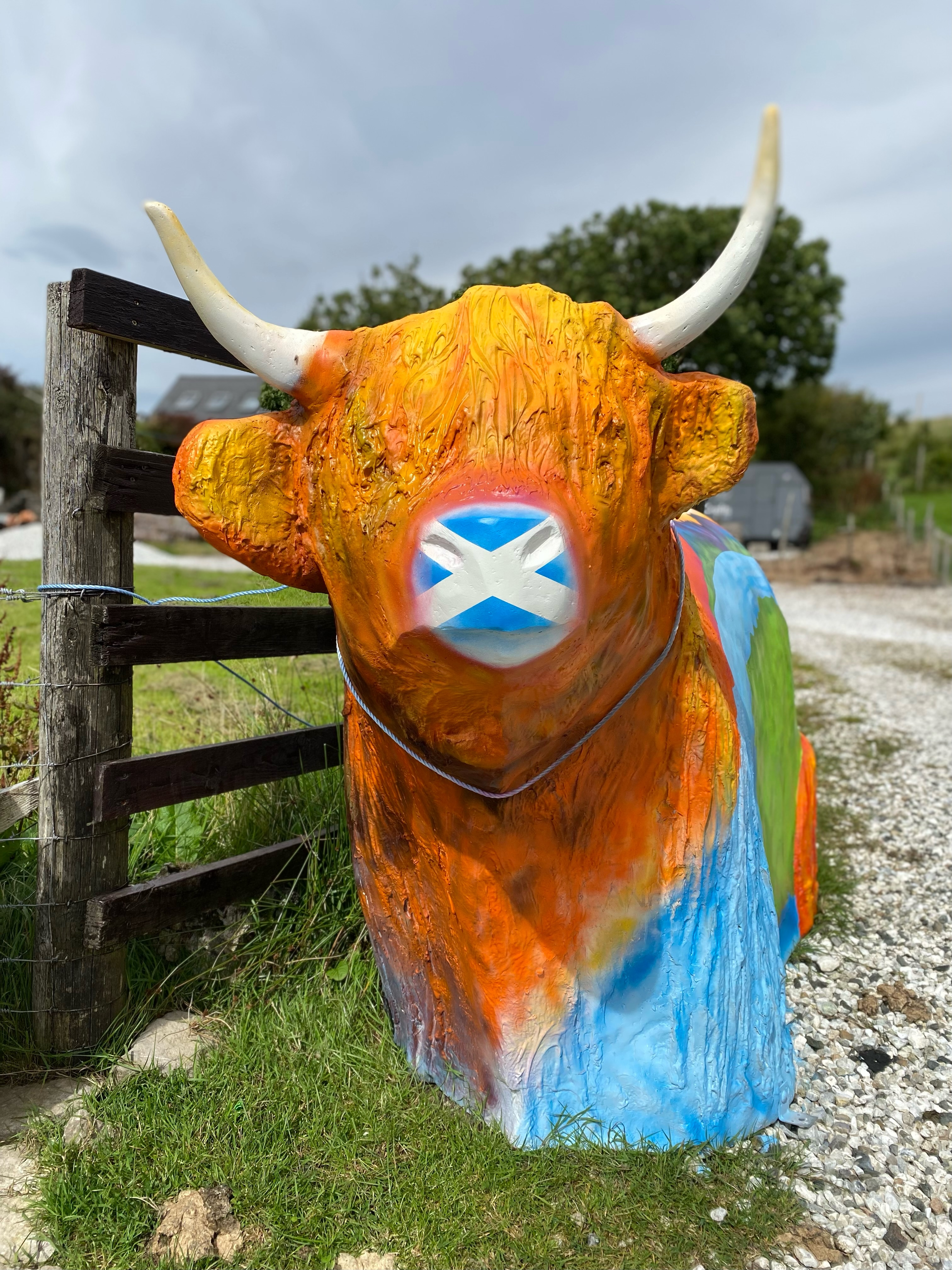
Jazz Buchanan's Highland Cow

== Present day ==
The village had a considerably higher population prior to the Clearances. It now has a population of approximately 150. Elgol's scenic attractions have drawn in many outsiders seeking holiday homes and a majority of the properties there are no longer occupied on a year-round basis. In the 2011 census, 31% of the residents were reported as speaking Scottish Gaelic.

The village is also a terminal for two privately owned boat trips to Loch Coruisk and the Small Isles along with a coffee shop, Bistro and Coruisk House Michelin Guide restaurant. In 1972 the bulk carrier Nermo Smernokoff lost its full cargo of various cheeses which eventually washed up in Elgol Bay.
