= Camasunary =

Coordinates: 57.194831°N 6.114964°W

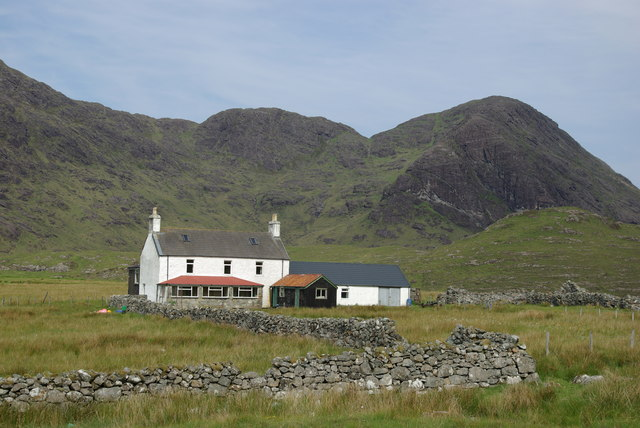

- Location within the Isle of Skye
- Civil parish: Strath
- Council area: Highland
- Country: Scotland
- Sovereign state: United Kingdom
- Police: Scotland
- Fire: Scottish
- Ambulance: Scottish

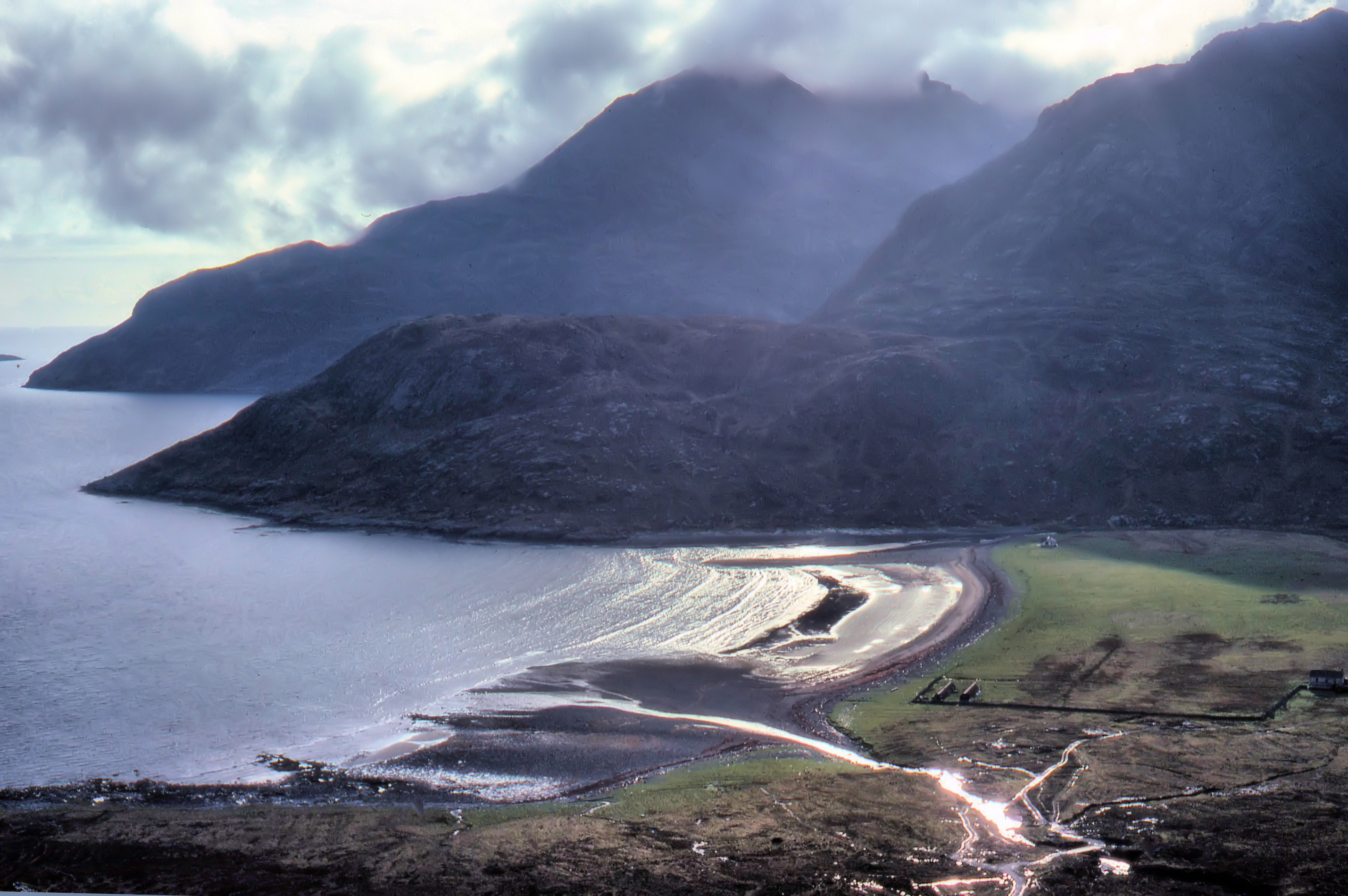
Camasunary from the east

Camasunary is a bay on the Strathaird peninsula of the Isle of Skye, Scotland. Camasunary is the Scots form of the Gaelic name Camas Fhionnairigh, and means "Bay of the White Shieling". The township has about 10 ruined houses.

== Geology ==
The Camasunary Fault is a geological subsurface feature underlying a portion of the Isle of Skye extending under the Sea of the Hebrides.

== Recreation ==
The area is popular with hill walkers as it has a bothy and access to the Skye Munros. In 2014 the old bothy was replaced by a new one that was built by the Royal Engineers.

== Location ==
An off-road vehicle track connects to Kirkibost. The bay is privately owned, although it sits in the middle of land owned by the John Muir Trust.
