= John Barkham (antiquary) =

English clergyman, antiquary and historian

John Barkham, D.D. (1572?–1642) was an English clergyman, antiquary and historian. Highly reputed in his time as an authority, he published relatively little. He supported the efforts of John Speed, and may have been a source for the Display of Heraldry of John Guillim (the book was attributed to him as a publication under Guillim's name, for some time).

Barkham made a very extensive collection of coins, which he gave to William Laud; who presented them to the Bodleian Library. He left also a treatise on coins in manuscript, which was never published.

== Life ==
Barkham was born in the parish of St. Mary-the-Moor, Exeter, about 1572. He entered Exeter College, Oxford in 1587, and in the following year was admitted scholar of Corpus Christi College, Oxford. He became B.A, in February 1591, M.A. in 1594, and probationer fellow of Corpus Christi College in 1596.

In 1603 he took the degree of B.D., and some time after he was made chaplain to Dr. John Bancroft, Archbishop of Canterbury, an office which he also held under his successor, George Abbot. In June 1608 he was collated to the rectory of Finchley, Middlesex. He was then given livings in Essex: in March 1615 the rectory of Packlesham; in May following the rectory of Lackington; and in December 1616 the rectory and deanery of Bocking. In 1615 he resigned the rectory of Finchley and in 1617 that of Packlesham. At Bocking he had as curate in the period 1627 to 1631 Nathaniel Rogers, who later emigrated to New England as pastor of Ipswich, Massachusetts.

He died at Bocking on 25 March 1642, and was buried in the chancel of the church there. He married Anne, daughter of Robert Rogers, of Dartford, Kent, by whom he had one son.

== Works ==
Barkham had a reputation as an accomplished linguist, an able divine, and an erudite antiquary and historian; but he published comparatively little. John Speed, the author of the History of Britain, received assistance from him, and Barkham wrote for that work the Life and Reign of King John, and the Life and Reign of Henry II. According to Anthony à Wood he composed in his younger days a book on heraldry, which he gave to Guillim, who published it in 1610, with the author's sanction, under his own name. There is reason to suppose that the material he gave to Guillim was notes.

In 1625 Barkham published, with a preface, the posthumous volume of Richard Crakanthorpe, Defensio Ecclesiae Anglicanae contra M. Antonii de Dominis injurias, a reply to Marc'Antonio de Dominis.
