= John de Lancaster =

John de Lancaster may refer to:

- John of Lancaster, Duke of Bedford, regent of France
- John de Lancastre, 1st Baron Lancastre, medieval parliamentary baron
- John de Lancaster (MP) for Lancashire (UK Parliament constituency)
- John de Lancaster (novel), an 1809 novel by Richard Cumberland
