= John Guillim =

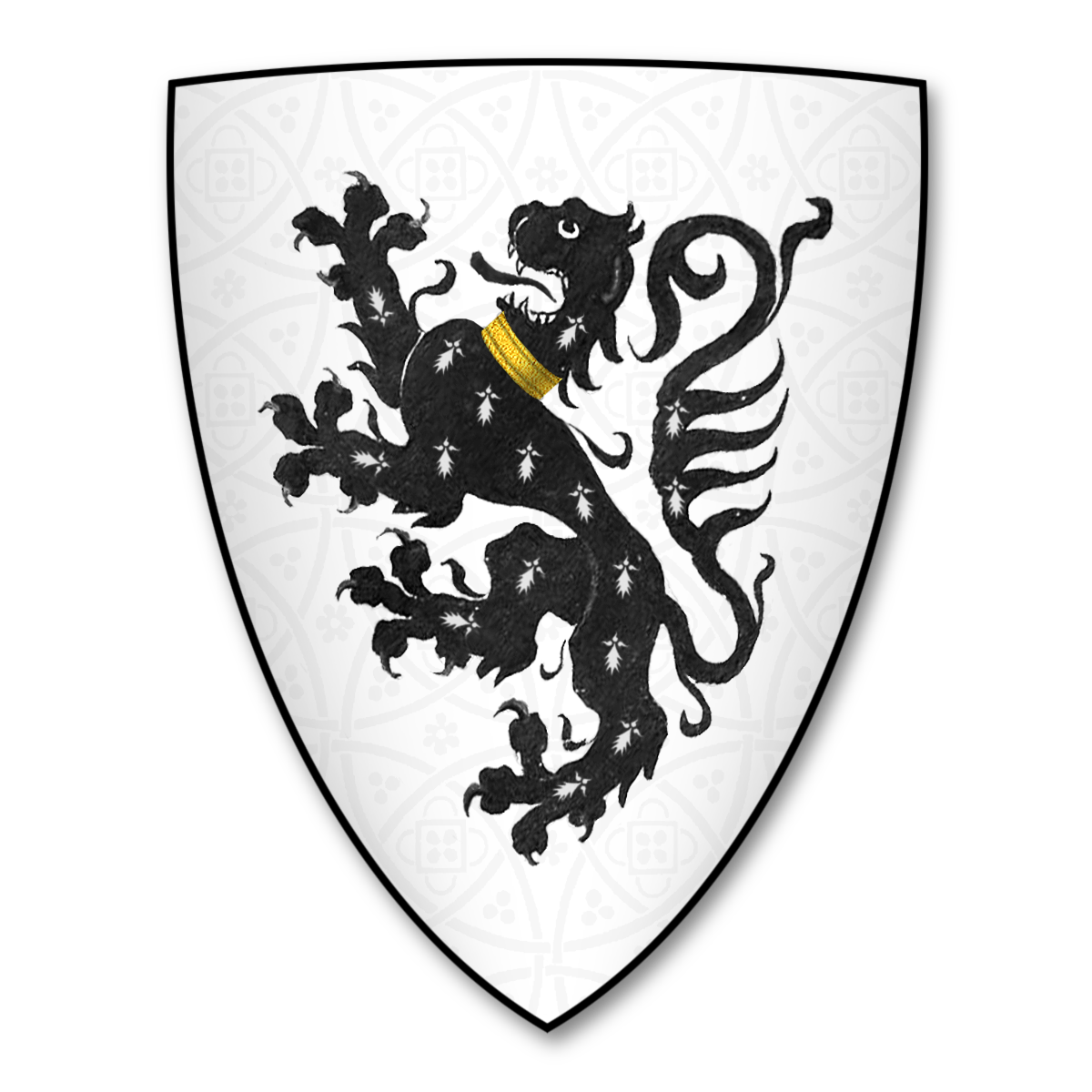
Arms of Guillim of Minsterworth: Argent, a lion rampant ermines collared or

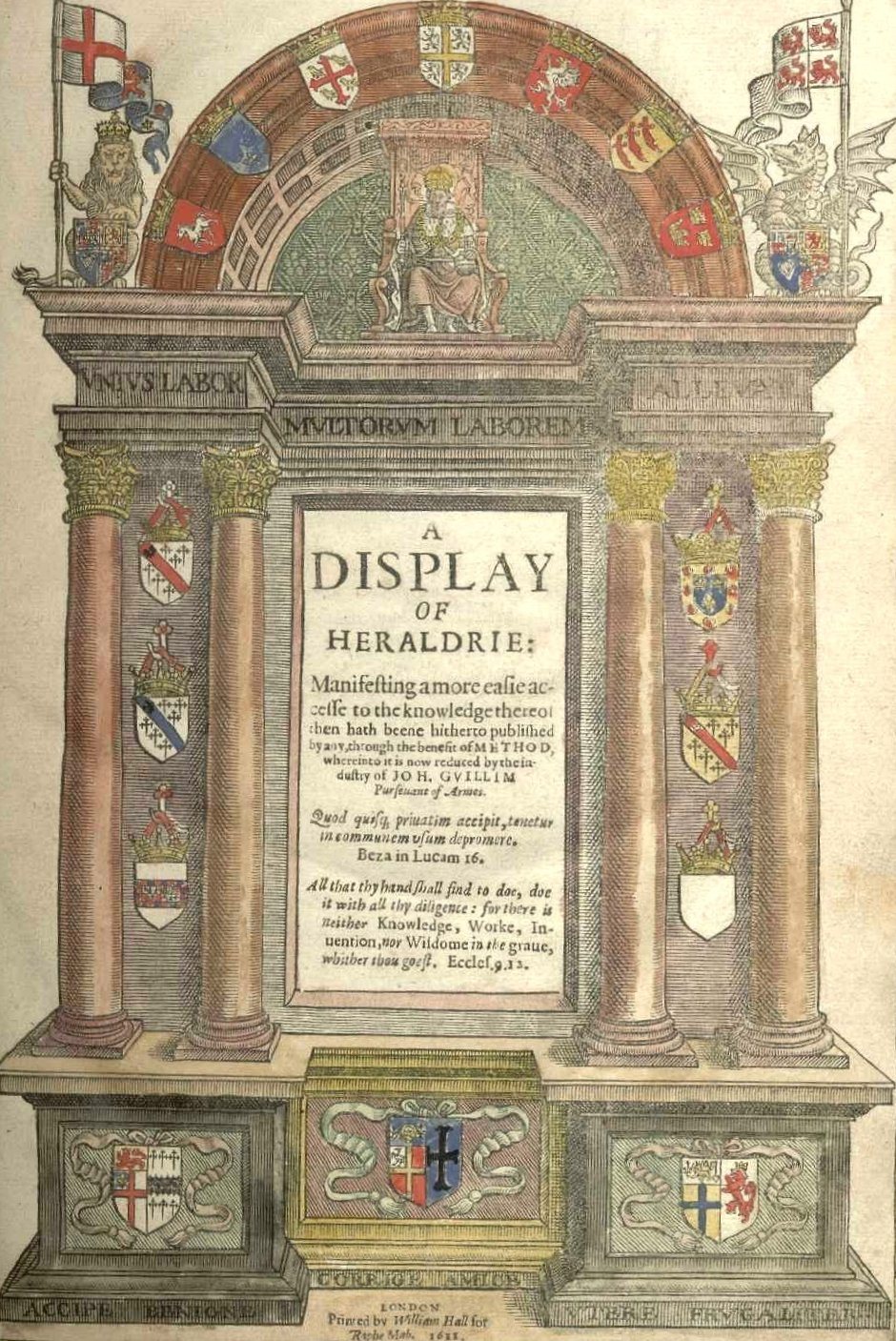
Hand-colored frontispiece of John Guillim's landmark work, A Display of Heraldrie

John Guillim (c. 1565 – 7 May 1621) of Minsterworth, Gloucestershire, was an antiquarian and officer of arms at the College of Arms in London. He is best remembered for his monumental work on heraldry, A Display of Heraldry, first published in London in 1610.

== Early life and education ==
Most sources date the birth of John Guillim to 1565 in the county of Hereford. However, it is possible he may have been born around 1550. He was the son of John Guillim of Westbury-on-Severn in Gloucestershire. This part of England is very close to the border with Wales and Guillim's ancestors were probably of Welsh extraction. He was educated at Brasenose College in Oxford University.

== Heraldic career ==
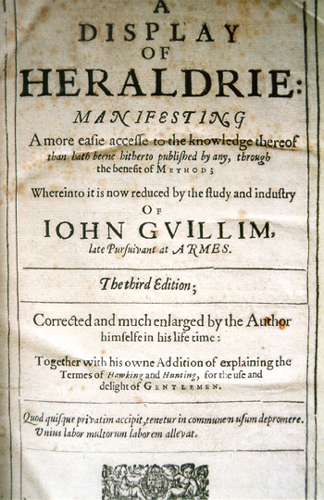
Display of Heraldry, title page of third edition (1638)

The first record of his involvement with heraldry is the Earl Marshal's warrant, dated 23 February 1604, permitting him to wear the tabard of the Portsmouth Pursuivant Extraordinary. From Michaelmas 1613 he was receiving a salary from the College of Arms, although his official appointment as Rouge Croix Pursuivant of Arms in Ordinary was not made until 1618 The Display of Heraldry was written in about 1610 and was re-printed as early as 1611. Following Guillim's death seven further editions of the work appeared, the last in 1724. Some sources suggest that the original author of the Display of Heraldry was in fact a clergyman named John Barkham who was unwilling to have the work published in his own name.

The early writings on English heraldry, including Guillim, "not only perpetuate the nonsensical natural history of olden days but are largely responsible for erroneous beliefs about heraldic charges having definite symbolic meanings and their being granted as rewards for valorous deeds—beliefs that today are perpetuated by the vendors of mail-order and shopping mall family coats of arms."

== Marriage and children ==
John Guillim of Minsterworth married Frances Denys, second daughter of Richard Denys (1525-1593), MP, of Cold Ashton and Siston Court, Gloucestershire, by his wife Anne St John, daughter of Sir John St. John of Bletsoe. By Frances he had the following children, 5 boys and 6 girls:

- St John Guillim
- Walter Guillim
- George Guillim
- Thomas Guillim
- Richard Guillim
- Prescilla Guillim
- Margaret Guillim
- Frances Guillim
- Elizabeth Guillim
- Anne Guillim
- Alice Guillim

== Death and burial ==
Guillim's death is recorded as having occurred on 7 May 1621, probably at Minsterworth, although there is no record of his place of burial.
