= Egyptian Hall =

Exhibition hall in London 1812–1905

Coordinates: 51°30′29″N 0°8′21″W

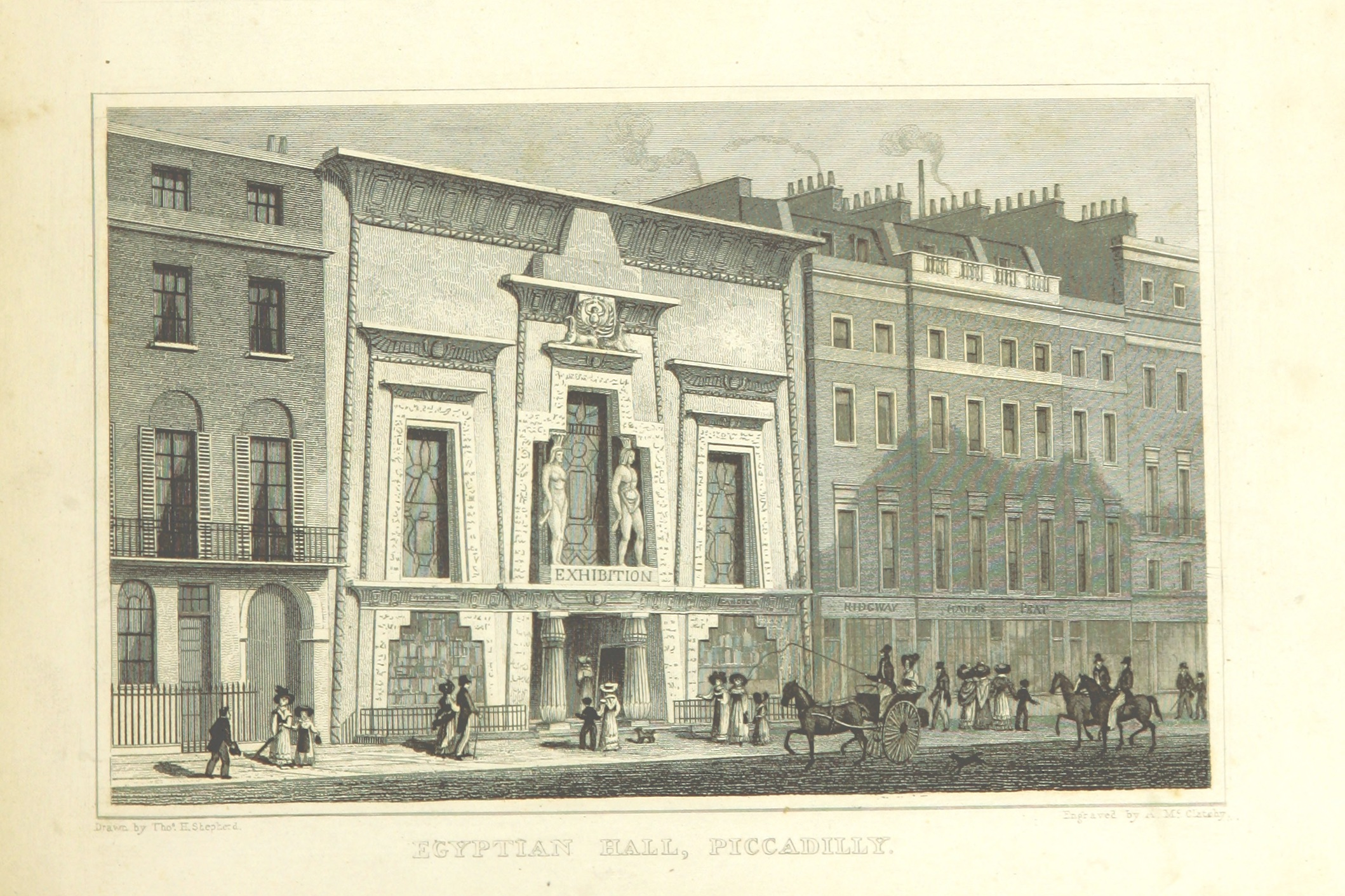
Egyptian Hall in 1828

The Egyptian Hall in Piccadilly, London, was an exhibition hall built in the ancient Egyptian style in 1812, to the designs of Peter Frederick Robinson. The Hall was a considerable success, with exhibitions of art and of Napoleonic era relics. The hall was later used for popular entertainments and lectures, and developed an association with magic and spiritualism, becoming known as "England's Home of Mystery".

A large room known as the Dudley Gallery was an important space for art exhibitions between 1812 and 1905, hired by the New English Art Club and other groups for their exhibitions. It then moved to Mill Street, off Conduit Street, as the "New Dudley Gallery". It is not to be confused with the Dudley Museum and Art Gallery in the Midlands town of Dudley.

== History ==
The Egyptian Hall was commissioned by William Bullock as a museum to house his collection, which included curiosities brought back from the South Seas by Captain Cook. It was completed in 1812 at a cost of £16,000. It was the first building in England to be influenced by the Egyptian style, partly inspired by the success of the Egyptian Room in Thomas Hope's house in Duchess Street, which was open to the public and had been well illustrated in Hope's Household Furniture and Interior Decoration (London, 1807). Unlike Bullock's Egyptian temple in Piccadilly, Hope's neoclassical façade betrayed no hint of the Egyptianizing decor it contained. Detailed renderings of various temples on the Nile, the Pyramids and the Sphinx had been accumulating for connoisseurs and designers in works such as Bernard de Montfaucon's, ten-volume L'Antiquité expliquée et representée en figures (1719–1724), which reproduces, methodically grouped, all the ancient monuments, Benoît de Maillet's Description de l'Égypte (1735), Richard Pococke's A Description of the East and Some Other Countries (1743), and Frederic Louis Norden's Voyage d'Egypte et de Nubie (1755); the first volume of the magisterial Description de l'Egypte (1810) had recently appeared in Paris. The plans for the hall were drawn up by architect Peter Frederick Robinson. Bullock, who had displayed his collection in Sheffield and Liverpool before opening in London, used the hall to put on various spectaculars, from which he made money through ticket sales. The museum was variously referred to as the London Museum, the Egyptian Hall or Museum, or Bullock's Museum.

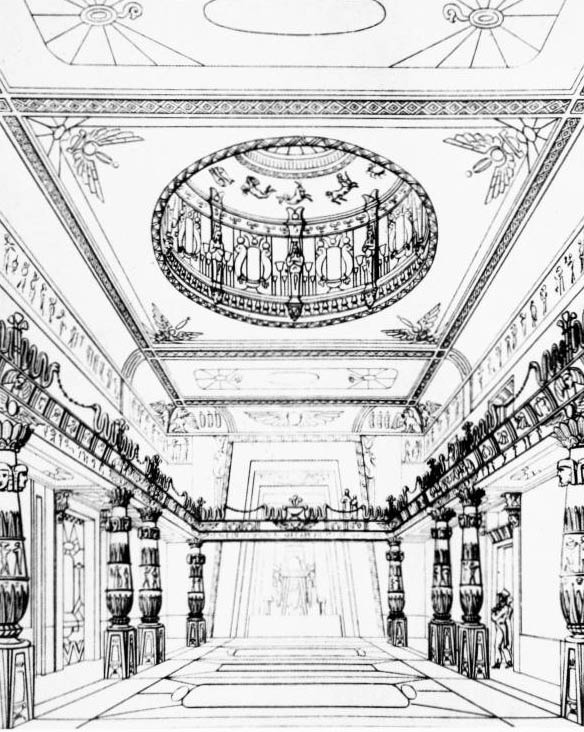
The Great Room of the Egyptian Hall, as redesigned by J. B. Papworth in 1819

The Hall was a considerable success, with an exhibition of Napoleonic era relics in 1816 including Napoleon's carriage taken at Waterloo being seen by about 220,000 visitors; Bullock made £35,000. In 1819, Bullock sold his ethnographical and natural history collection at auction and converted the museum into an exhibition hall. Subsequently, the Hall became a major venue for the exhibiting of works of art; it had the advantage of being almost the only London venue able to exhibit really large works. Usually admission cost one shilling. In 1820, The Raft of the Medusa by Théodore Géricault was exhibited from 10 June until the end of the year, rather overshadowing Benjamin Robert Haydon's painting, Christ's Entry into Jerusalem, on show in an adjacent room; Haydon rented rooms to show his work on several occasions. In 1821, exhibitions included Giovanni Battista Belzoni's show of the tomb of Seti I in 1821, and James Ward's gigantic Allegory of Waterloo. In 1822, a family of Laplanders with their reindeer were imported to be displayed in front of a painted backdrop, and give short sleigh-rides to visitors.

The bookseller George Lackington became owner of the Hall in 1825 and went on to use the facilities to show panoramas, art exhibits, and entertainment productions. The Hall became especially associated with watercolours. The old Water-Colour Society exhibited there in 1821–22, and it was hired by Charles Heath to display the watercolours commissioned by from Joseph Mallord William Turner forming Picturesque Views in England and Wales. Turner exhibited at the Hall for a number of years and it was also used as a venue for exhibitions by the Society of Painters in Water Colours.

The "Dudley Gallery" space, or configuration of a room in the Egyptian Hall, gained its name when the valuable collection of Old Master pictures belonging to William Ward, 1st Earl of Dudley was exhibited there for a while during the erection of his own gallery at Dudley House in Park Lane. The room gave its name to the Dudley Gallery Art Society (also known as The Old Dudley Art Society) when they were founded in 1861 and used it for their exhibitions. It was the venue chosen for their first exhibitions by the influential New English Art Club.

The hall was used principally for popular entertainments and lectures. Here Albert Smith related his ascent of Mont Blanc, illustrated by some cleverly dioramic views of the Alpine peaks.

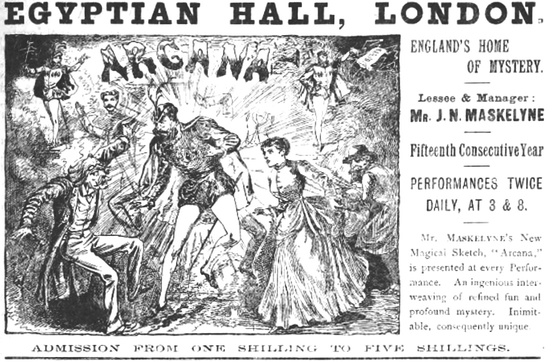
Advertisement (1888) for Arcana at the Egyptian Hall

By the end of the nineteenth century, the Hall was also associated with magic and spiritualism, as a number of performers and lecturers had hired it for shows. In 1873 William Morton took on the management of the Hall and modified it for his protegees, Maskelyne and Cooke, whose run there lasted a remarkable 31 years. The Hall became known as England's Home of Mystery. Many illusions were staged including the exposition of fraudulent spiritualistic manifestations then being practised by charlatans. The final performance was on 5 January 1905.

In 1905 the building was demolished to make room for blocks of flats and offices at 170–173 Piccadilly. Muirhead Bone captured its demise in his work The Dissolution of Egyptian Hall. The Maskelynes relocated to the St. George's Hall in Langham Place, which became known as Maskelyne's Theatre.

John Camden Hotten in A Dictionary of Modern Slang, Cant, and Vulgar Words documents the name in 1859 used as rhyming slang for a ball. Franklyn comments in 1960 "The term was demolished with the building."

== See also ==
- Egyptian Revival architecture in the British Isles
- Egyptian revival decorative arts
- List of demolished buildings and structures in London
