= Lackington =

Lackington is a surname. Notable people with the surname include:

- George Lackington (1777–1844), English bookseller and publisher
- James Lackington (1746–1815), English bookseller
- Solange Lackington (born 1962), Chilean actress, director and playwright
