= Richard Crakanthorpe =

English priest (1567–1624)

Richard Crakanthorpe (1567–1624) was an English Anglican priest, remembered both as a logician and as a religious controversialist.

His logical works still had currency in the eighteenth century, and there is an allusion in the novel Tristram Shandy. As a logician he was conservative, staying close to Aristotle and the Organon, and critical of the fashion for Ramism and its innovations. His Logicae was a substantial work, and was referred to by Samuel Johnson.

Crakanthorpe was, says Anthony à Wood,

a great canonist, and so familiar and exact in the fathers, councils, and schoolmen, that none in his time scarce went before him. None have written with greater diligence, I cannot say with a meeker mind, as some have reported that he was as foul-mouthed against the papists, particularly M. Ant. de Dominis, as Prynne was afterwards against them and the prelatists.

== Life ==
He was born at or near Strickland in Westmorland, and was baptised in 1568 in the nearby village of Morland. At the age of sixteen was admitted as a student at Queen's College, Oxford. According to Anthony à Wood he was first a "poor serving child", then a tabardar, and at length in 1598 became a fellow of that college. Crakanthorpe seems to have been much influenced by John Rainolds, and became conspicuous among the Puritan party at Oxford as a disputant and preacher. Wood describes him as a "zealot among them", and as having formed a coterie in his college of men of similar opinions, disciples of Rainolds. He was selected to accompany Ralph Eure, 3rd Lord Eure as his chaplain, with Thomas Morton, on a 1602 diplomatic mission to the Emperor Rudolph II and the King of Denmark.

Crakanthorpe preached an "Inauguration Sermon" at Paul's Cross on the accession of James I in 1603; and became chaplain to Thomas Ravis, Bishop of London, and chaplain in ordinary to the king. He was also admitted, early in 1605, on the presentation of Sir John Leverson, to the rectory of Black Notley, near Braintree in Essex. Sir John had had three sons at Queen's College, and had become acquainted with Crakanthorpe.

In 1617, succeeding John Barkham, Crakanthorpe was presented to the rectory of Paglesham by the Bishop of London. He had before this taken his degree of D.D. and been incorporated at Cambridge. He died at Black Notley, and was buried in the chancel of the church there on 25 November 1624. King James, to whom he was well known, said, somewhat unfeelingly, that he died for want of a bishopric.

== Works ==
His Inauguration Sermon was published in 1608. In 1616 he published a treatise in defence of the Emperor Justinian, against Cardinal Baronius. Other works were: Introductio in Metaphysicam, Oxford, 1619; Defence of Constantine, with a Treatise of the Pope's Temporal Monarchy, London 1621; Logicae libri quinque de Predicabilibus, Praedicamentis, London. 1622; Tractatus de Providentiâ Dei, Cambridge, 1622.

The Defensio Ecclesiae Anglicanae, Crakanthorpe's best-known controversial work, was not published till after his death, when it was given to the world (1625) by his friend John Barkham, who also preached his funeral sermon. Marcantonio de Dominis, the Roman Catholic Archbishop of Spalatro, came to England as a convert to the Church of England, having published his reasons in a book called Consilium Profectionis (Heidelberg and London 1616). After about six years' residence in England he returned to Rome, and published a retractation (Consilium Reditus). A perfect storm of vituperation broke out against him. Crakanthorpe answered in his Defensio Ecclesiae, taking the retractation sentence by sentence, and pouring out a stream of invective. The first edition was full of errors; it was edited at Oxford in 1847. Several other works written by him of anti-Catholic controversy were published after his death.

- A Sermon of Sanctification preached on the Act Sunday at Oxford (London, 1608)
- A Sermon at the Solemnizing of the Happie Inauguration of our most Gracious and Religious Soveraigne King James (London, 1609)
- Justinian the Emperor defended against Cardinal Baronius (London, 1616)
- Introductio in metaphysicam (Oxford, 1619)
- A Sermon of Predestination preached at Saint Maries in Oxford (London, 1620)
- The Defence of Constantine with a Treatise of the Popes Temporall Monarchie (London, 1621)
- Logicae libri quinque (London, 1622)
- De providentia Dei tractatus (Cambridge, 1623)
- Defensio Eccelesiae Anglicanae (London, 1625)
