= An Overshot Mill in Aberdulais, Wales =

1847 painting by James Ward

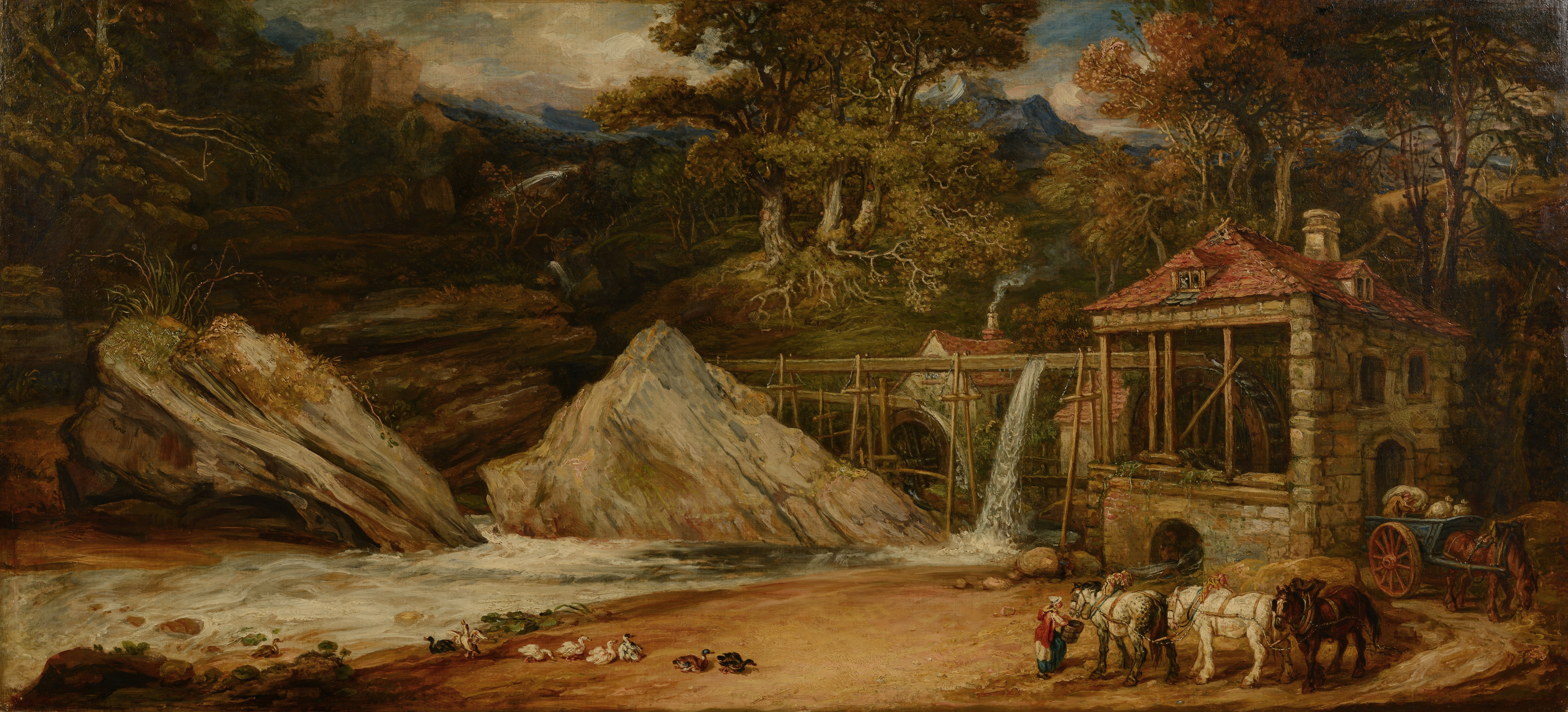
- Artist: James Ward
- Year: 1847
- Medium: Oil on canvas
- Dimensions: 63 cm × 137 cm (25 in × 54 in)
- Location: National Library of Wales, Aberystwyth

An Overshot Mill in Aberdulais, Wales is an 1847 oil on canvas painting by the British artist James Ward in the National Library of Wales.

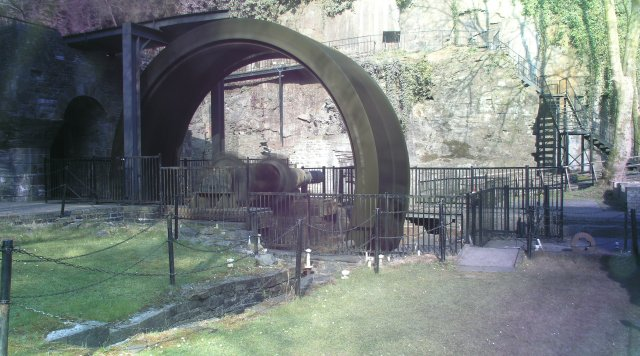
The Waterwheel used for electric power at Aberdulais in 2007 (spokes blurred out)

This painting shows the water mill located at the junction of the Dulais river and the Neath, near Aberdulais Falls. The scene was also painted by J. M. W. Turner.

The same scene in old prints:

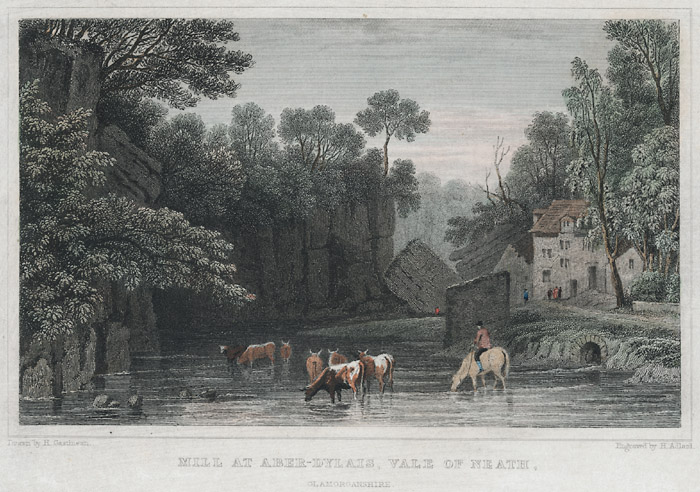
Mill at Aber-Dylais, vale of Neath, Glamorganshire

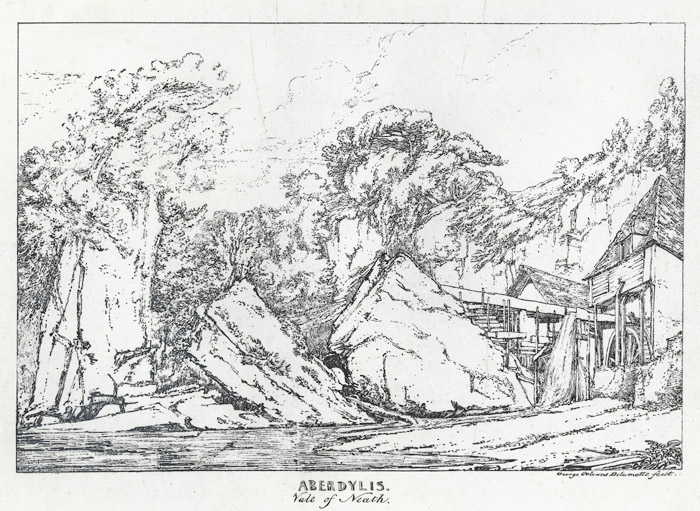
Aberdylis, vale of Neath
