= John de Lancaster (novel) =

1809 novel

- Author: Richard Cumberland
- Language: English
- Publisher: Lackington, Allen, & Co.
- Publication date: 1809
- Publication place: United Kingdom
- Media type: Print

John de Lancaster is a three volume novel by the British writer Richard Cumberland, first published in 1809. Cumberland, better known as a playwright, also produced three novels of which this was the last. It was published in London by Lackington, Allen, & Co. of Finsbury Square. Walter Scott wrote a review of the novel in the Quarterly Review. It was one of his final works, and two years later he died and was buried in Westminster Abbey.

== Bibliography ==
- Day, Gary & Lynch, Jack. The Encyclopedia of British Literature, 3 Volume Set: 1660 - 1789. John Wiley & Sons, 2015.
- Garside, Peter, Raven, James & Schöwerling, Rainer. The English Novel, 1770-1829. Oxford University Press, 2000.
- Watson, George. The New Cambridge Bibliography of English Literature: Volume 2, 1660–1800. Cambridge University Press, 1971.
- Williams, Ioan (ed.) Sir Walter Scott on Novelists and Fiction. Routledge, 2010.
