= Venus Rising from her Couch =

Painting by James Ward

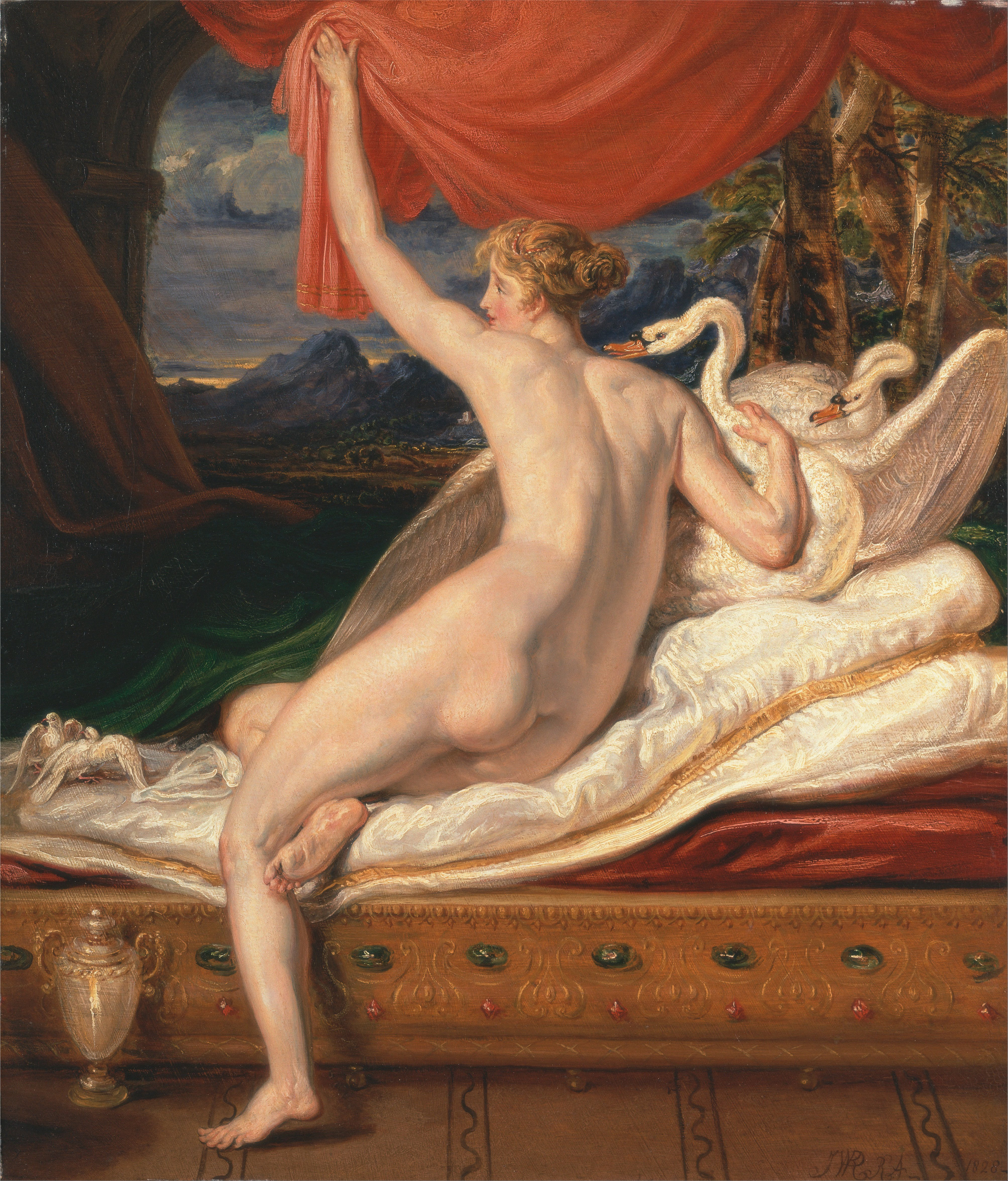
- Artist: James Ward
- Year: 1828
- Type: Oil on panel
- Dimensions: 76.2 cm × 65.4 cm (30.0 in × 25.7 in)
- Location: Yale Center for British Art, New Haven

Venus Rising from her Couch is an oil on panel mythological painting by the English artist James Ward, from 1828.

It depicts the Roman goddess Venus rising from a couch. As often depicted in paintings, she is accompanied by swans. It pays homage to the style of the Old Masters Titian and Peter Paul Rubens and also to the more recent painter Henry Fuseli.

In 1830 it was displayed at the Royal Academy's Summer Exhibition at Somerset House along with another pendant piece by Ward Diana at Bath. Critics honed in on their unseemly nudity with one reviewer arguing the painting "possesses not one redeeming virtue to atone for its indelicacy". Today the painting is in the collection of the Yale Center for British Art.

== Bibliography ==
- Cormack, Malcolm. Country Pursuits: British, American, and French Sporting Art from the Mellon Collections in the Virginia Museum Of Fine Arts. Virginia Museum of Fine Arts, 2007.
- Fussell, George Edwin. James Ward R.A.: Animal Painter, 1769-1859, and His England. Michael Joseph, 1974.
