= Gordale Scar (painting) =

Painting by James Ward

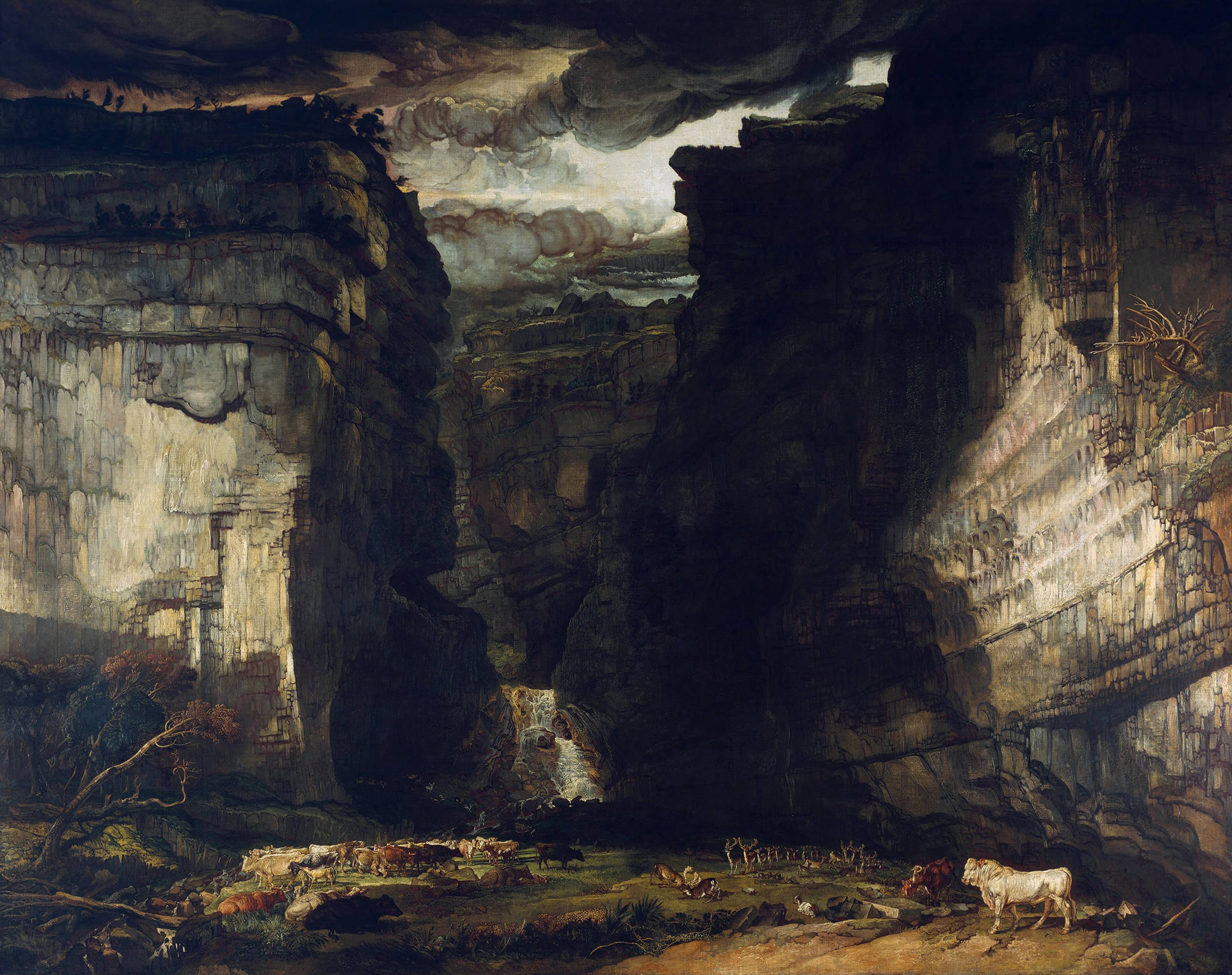
- Artist: James Ward
- Year: 1814
- Type: Oil on canvas, landscape painting
- Dimensions: 332.7 cm × 421.6 cm (131.0 in × 166.0 in)
- Location: Tate Britain, London

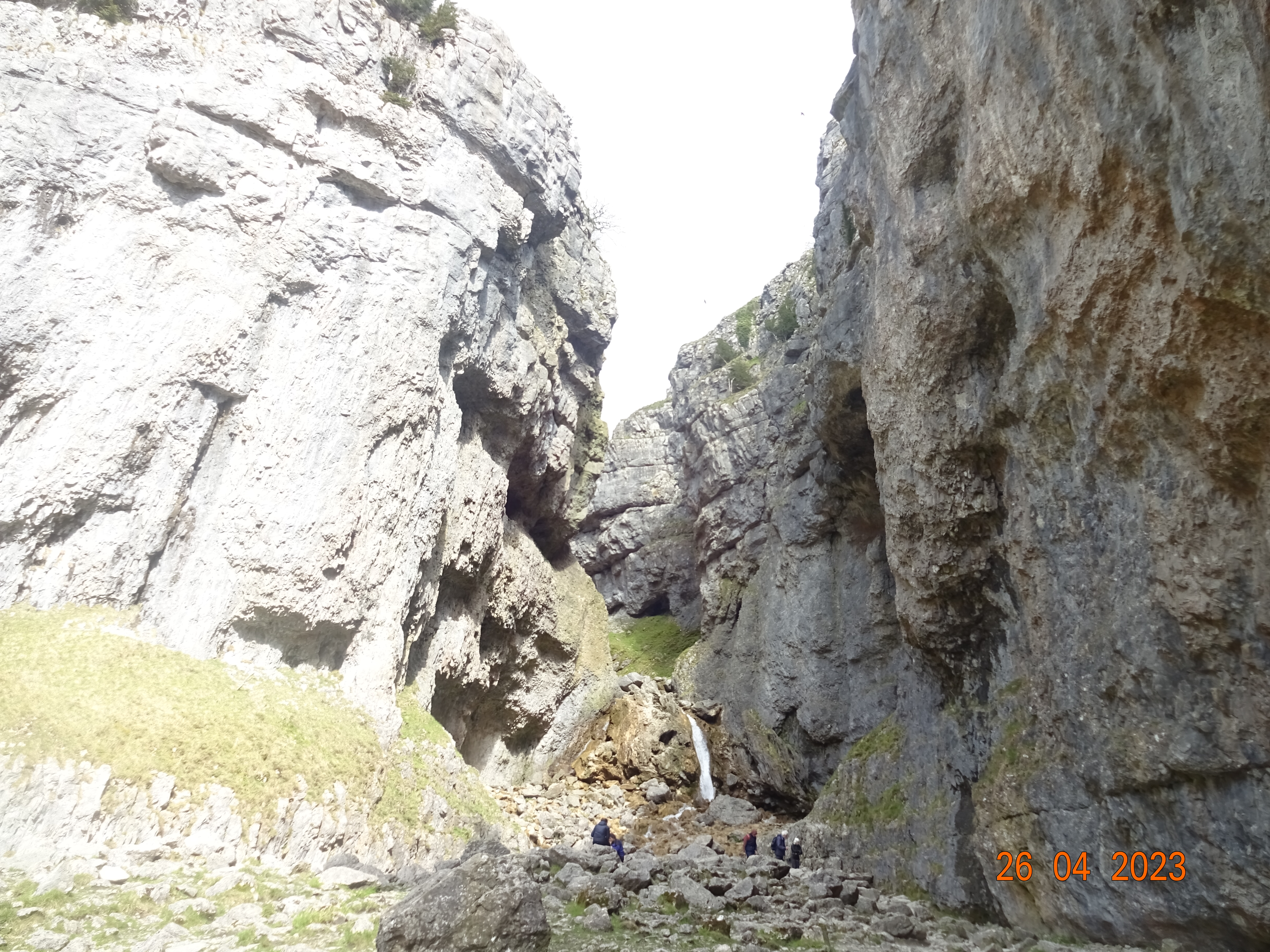
The real Gordale Scar in the Yorkshire Dales

Gordale Scar is an oil on canvas landscape painting by the British artist James Ward, from 1814. Noted for its large size, it portrays Gordale Scar, a limestone ravine in North Yorkshire. Romantic in style, it combines topographical accuracy with an exaggeration of scale to emphasise the sublime.

The work was commissioned by the local landowner Lord Ribblesdale. Ward likely envisaged the work in the context of the ongoing Napoleonic Wars, with an unchanging English landscape being guarded by John Bull represented by the bull in the bottom right corner. The painting was displayed the Royal Academy Exhibition of 1815 at Somerset House in London. Today it is in the collection of the Tate Britain, having been acquired in 1878.

== Bibliography ==
- Beckett, Oliver. The Life and Work of James Ward, R.A., 1769-1859: The Forgotten Genius. Book Guild, 1995.
- Fussell, George Edwin. James Ward R.A.: Animal Painter, 1769-1859, and His England. Michael Joseph, 1974.
- Hichberger J.W.M. Images of the Army: The Military in British Art, 1815-1914. Manchester University Press, 2017
