= Allegory of Waterloo =

Lost painting by James Ward

Allegory of Waterloo, also known as Triumph of the Duke of Wellington or the Triumph of Great Britain after the Battle of Waterloo, was a monumental painting by British artist James Ward, completed in 1821, and now lost.

Ward won a competition organised by the British Institution in 1816 to create an artwork to celebrate the final victory over Napoleon at the Battle of Waterloo the previous year. He was commissioned to create a full-size painting, and paid 1,000 guineas.

Rather than painting portraits of the Duke of Wellington and his generals, or a scene from the battle, Ward proposed an allegorical treatment. Ward's painting showed the Duke of Wellington in the red uniform of a British Field Marshal with decorations and sashes, standing in a triumphal chariot accompanied by the figure of Britannia. The chariot was drawn by four white horses, led by allegorical figures. Above was a sweltering orange sun and an angel, while more allegorical symbols and characters littered the canvas. Twisted Solomonic column to the left and right sides framed the image, supporting a swagged entablature above.

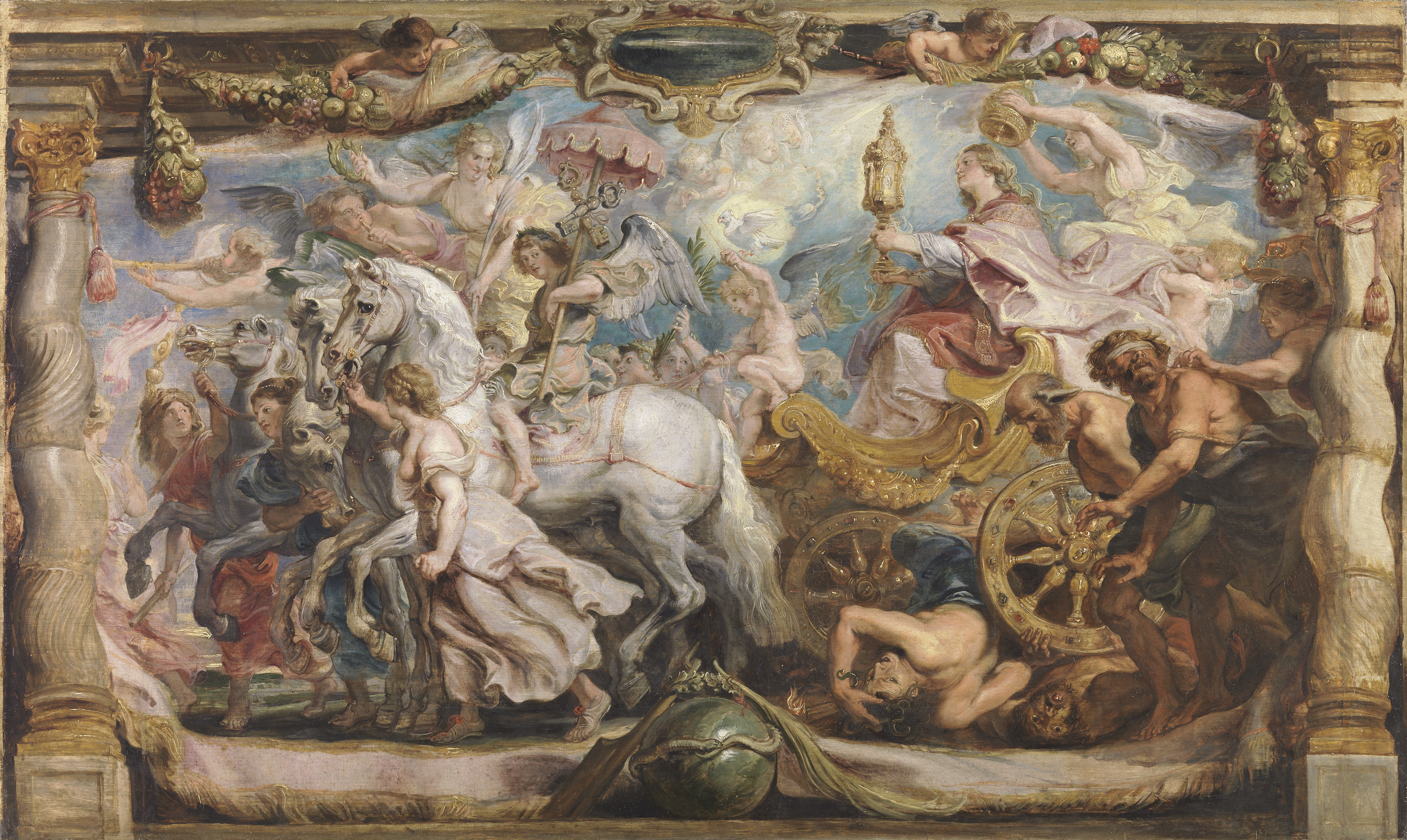
Peter Paul Rubens – The triumph of the Eucharist over Ignorance and Blindness

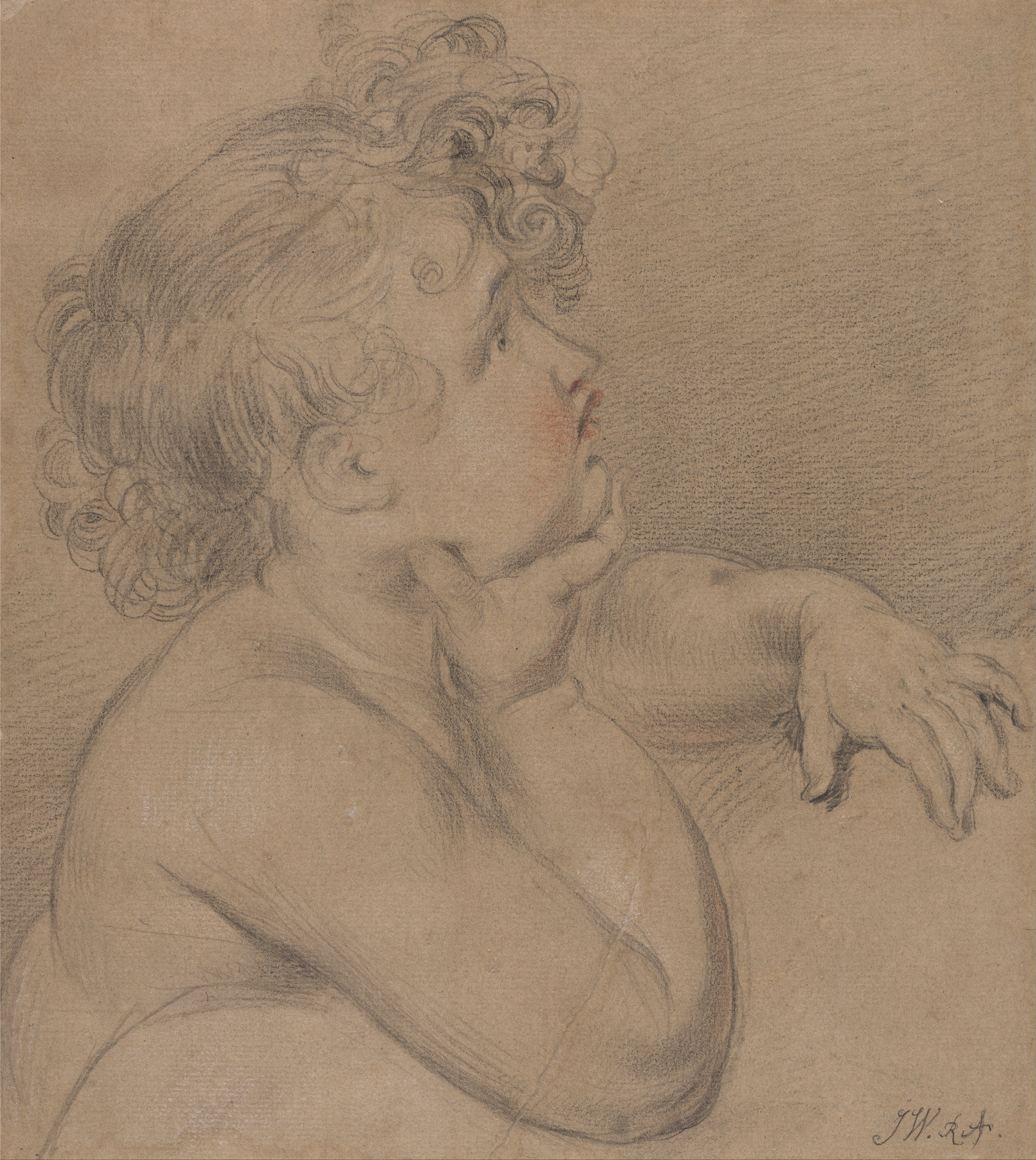
Study for a figure in the painting

The painting seems to have been inspired by a 17th-century tapestry, Triumph of the Eucharist over Ignorance and Blindness, from a 20-part series by Rubens on the Triumph of the Eucharist commissioned by Infanta Clara Eugenia, Governor of the Spanish Netherlands, for the Convent of Las Descalzas Reales in Madrid; six of Ruben's preparatory oil sketches are held by the Prado Museum in Madrid.

Ward's painting took 6 years to complete, and the final work measured 21 × 35 feet (6.4 × 10.7 m), more than three times the expected size. Although his concept won the first prize in 1816, praise had turned to criticism by the time the painting was completed in 1822. The monumental image was exhibited at the Egyptian Hall in Piccadilly in 1822, and then donated to the Royal Hospital Chelsea, but it was so large it was rarely hung in the hall there as intended. It was later cut into several pieces which have been lost.

Some studies and drawings survive. The historical collections of the Royal Hospital Chelsea hold Ward's original oil-on-canvas study, exhibited at the British Institution in 1816, which measures 90 × 132 centimetres (35 × 52 in), and there is a detailed drawing held by the Fitzwilliam Museum Cambridge which measures 61 × 106 centimetres (24 × 42 in). Some of Ward's studies for details of the painting were exhibited at the Royal Academy Summer Exhibition in 1837.
