= Minsterworth =

Village in Gloucestershire, England

Coordinates: 51.85113°N 2.32951°W

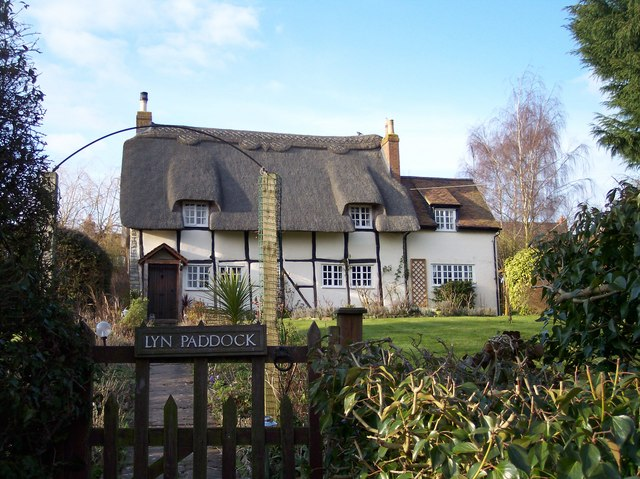
- Lyn Paddock, Minsterworth

- Location within Gloucestershire
- Population: 444 (2011 Census)
- District: Tewkesbury
- Shire county: Gloucestershire
- Region: South West
- Country: England
- Sovereign state: United Kingdom
- Post town: Gloucester
- Postcode district: GL2
- Police: Gloucestershire
- Fire: Gloucestershire
- Ambulance: South Western
- UK Parliament: Forest of Dean

Minsterworth is a village in Gloucestershire, England. It lies on the border of the City of Gloucester, on the north bank of the River Severn (effectively on the western side of the river) and on the A48 road between Gloucester and Chepstow.

Minsterworth is governed by a parish council. The parish includes the village of Calcott's Green. The population of the village as at the 2011 census was 444. The population in mid-2014 was 470 people, with 70 people aged 0–15, 270 people aged 16–64 and 135 people aged 65+. The higher levels of government are Tewkesbury Borough Council and Gloucestershire County Council.

The village has a long history, at one stage being held by the rebellious baron Simon de Montfort. Its economy used to be heavily involved with salmon-fishing in the Severn, as illustrated by a carving in the local church of three salmon caught in a fishing net. Fishing for elvers remains an important activity. The local church, St Peter's, lies right next to the river, with three ancient yews in the churchyard. It was rebuilt by Henry Woodyer (who had earlier worked on the nearby church in Highnam) in 1870, but contains many older features such as a fifteenth-century baptismal font, a Jacobean pulpit and part of a fourteenth-century cope.

The village has a church (St Peter's), a primary school (Minsterworth C of E) and a village hall. In December 2017, the primary school was forced to shut down due to a lack of pupils. The school buildings are now utilised as a community centre (The Harvey Centre) and a day nursery for children aged 2-5 (Minsterworth Kindergarten).

The Severn Bore Inn, butchers shop and waterski club, often attributed to the village, actually lie outside the parish boundary. It also has a number of listed buildings dating from the 16th, 17th and 18th centuries.

The village of Minsterworth is an Acorn Class 2 area and is one of the more desirable areas in Gloucestershire and the most desirable village in close proximity to the city of Gloucester. Average incomes are higher than average for Gloucestershire and England with the total weekly household income for 2007-2008 estimated at £720, compared to £673 for both Gloucestershire and England as a whole. Interest in current affairs is high.

The village is one of the best places to view the Severn Bore, where people can be seen surfing and water skiing from the local water ski club.

F. W. Harvey, war poet and broadcaster, dubbed the "Laureate of Gloucestershire", is buried in the village churchyard.
