= James Lackington =

British bookseller (1746–1815)

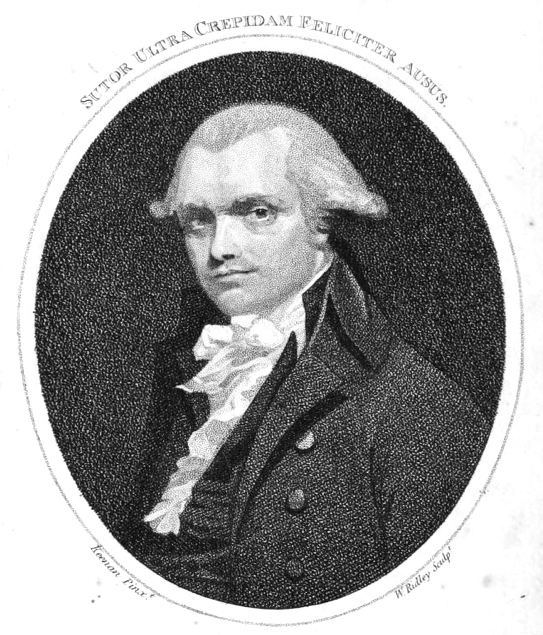
- Portrait of James Lackington, ca.1790s
- Born: 31 August 1746; Wellington, Somerset
- Died: 22 December 1815 (aged 69); Budleigh Salterton, Devon
- Occupation: Bookseller

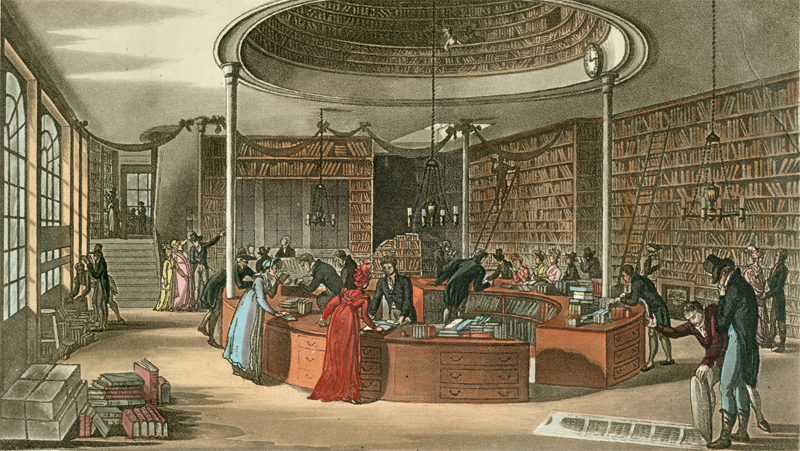
Artist's rendition of the interior of Lackington's 'Temple of the Muses' bookstore, 1809.

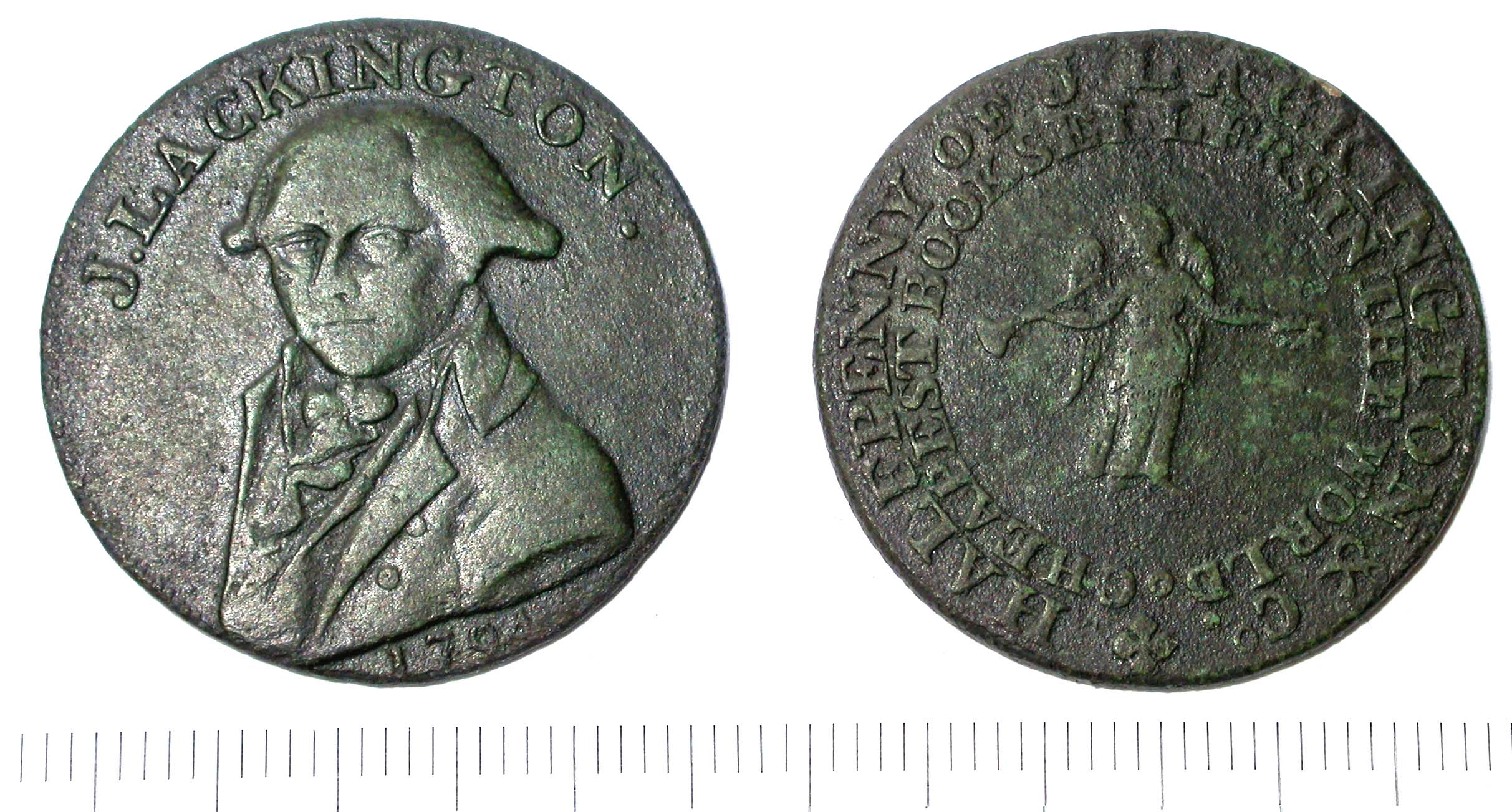
Token issued by Lackington in 1794, reverse reads "HALFPENNY of J. LACKINGTON & Co." "CHEAPEST BOOKSELLERS IN THE WORLD"

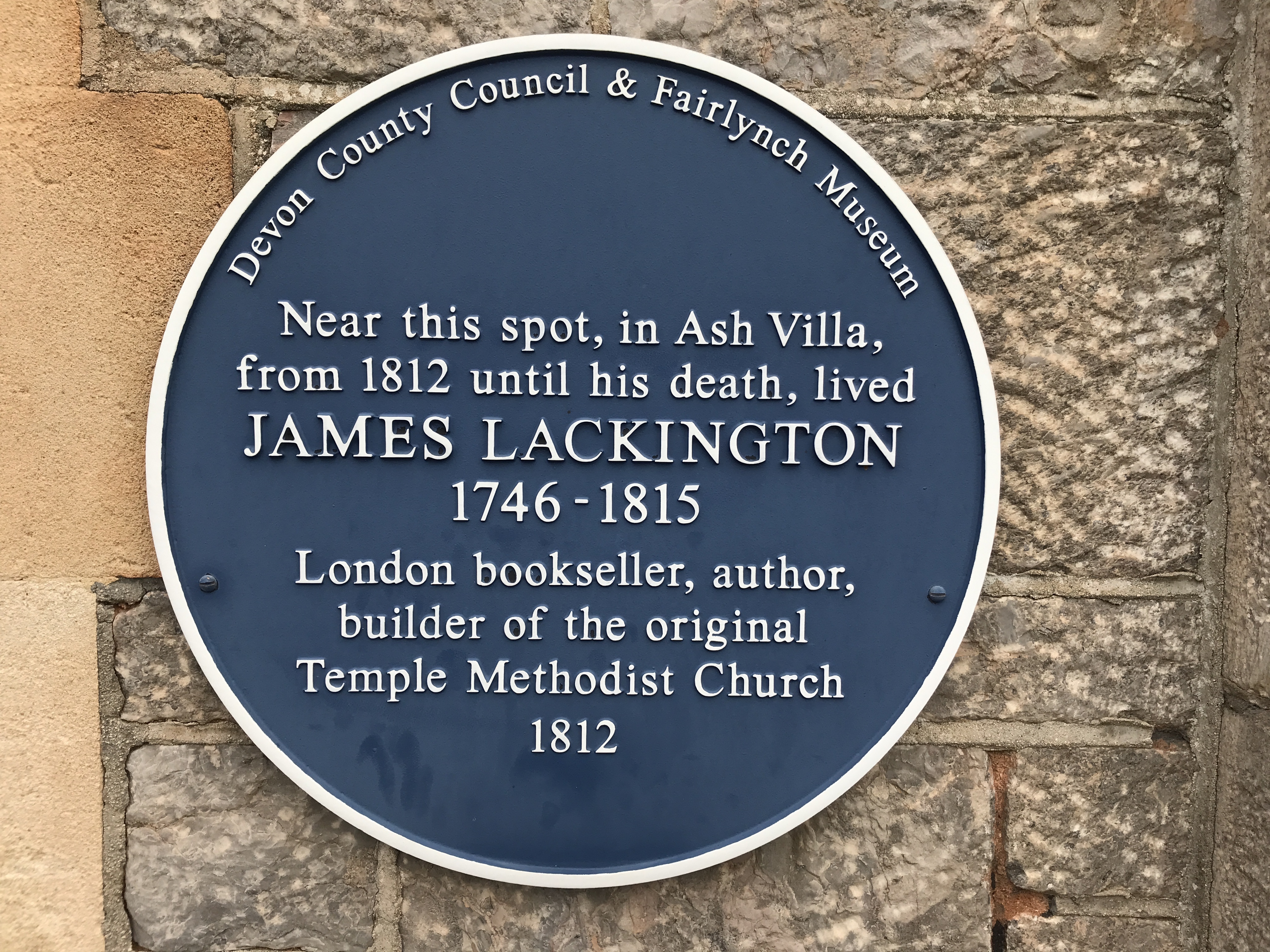
Blue plaque commemorating James Lackington in Budleigh Salterton

James Lackington (31 August 1746 in Wellington, Somerset – 22 November 1815 in Budleigh Salterton, Devon) was a bookseller who is credited with revolutionizing the British book trade. He is best known for refusing credit at his London bookshop which allowed him to reduce the price of books throughout his store. He built the largest bookstore in the United Kingdom, with an inventory of over 500,000 volumes.

== Early life ==
The son of a shoemaker, and one of 11 children, Lackington was apprenticed to a cobbler at an early age. He showed initiative by also selling pies and cakes in the street when aged 10. Lackington had no formal education so in order to teach himself to read, he and his friends would often scour flea markets for cheap editions of plays, and classical literature.

== "Temple of the Muses" bookstore ==
In August 1773, Lackington moved to London with his first wife, Nancy. Upon arrival, he spent their last half-crown on a book of poems. Later, in his memoirs, he explained: "for had I bought a dinner, we should have eaten it to-morrow, and the pleasure would have been soon over, but should we live fifty years longer, we shall have the Night Thoughts to feast upon." In 1774, Lackington had saved enough money to be able to rent his own shop, and he began selling both shoes and books together.

He bought whole libraries and published writers' manuscripts. He also saved remaindered books from destruction and resold them at bargain prices, firmly believing that books were the key to knowledge, reason and happiness and that everyone, no matter their economic background, social class or gender, had the right to access books at cheap prices.

By 1794, Lackington had amassed a large enough inventory to move into a massive shop on Finsbury Square with his business partner Robert Allen. Lackington named the store "Temple of the Muses" and was said to have been large enough "that a mail-coach and four were driven round the counters at its opening". Above the entrance of the store, he placed a plaque which read: "Cheapest Bookstore in the World." The bookstore was the largest in the United Kingdom, and boasted an inventory of over 500,000 volumes, with annual sales of 100,000 books. The store was making yearly revenues of £5,000 (roughly $700,000 today).

Later that year, Lackington minted a token which customers could use as an in-store currency. The token had Lackington's image on the obverse and the reverse read "HALFPENNY of J. LACKINGTON & Co." "CHEAPEST BOOKSELLERS IN THE WORLD." Lackington became somewhat of a celebrity in London. A flag would fly above the bookstore when he was present, and he rode through the streets in a custom stagecoach, inscribed with his personal motto: “Small profits do great things.” A catalogue of Lackington's available inventory was regularly printed, and book orders were fulfilled for places as far away as the United States. According to Lackington, the first edition of his catalogue contained 12,000 titles. Lackington partnered with Hughes, Harding, Mavor & Jones to publish a very small amount of copies Frankenstein by Mary Shelley, who was unknown at the time. As a bookseller turned publisher, Lackington also published multiple editions of his own autobiography, in part because he was acutely aware that his reputation was at stake, since his success drew criticism from other booksellers.

Lackington was a member of the Honourable Artillery Company at the time of the Gordon Riots of 1780.

== Autobiographies ==
Lackington wrote two autobiographies: Memoirs of the First Forty-Five Years of the Life of James Lackington (1791) which was published in multiple editions and The Confessions of James Lackington (1804), to which Letters, on the bad consequences of having daughters educated at Boarding Schools was later appended. The front matter in variant editions of Lackington's Memoirs has been analyzed by Corrina Readioff who observed, "Of particular interest in Lackington’s programme of literary self-construction is his persistent and enthusiastic use of quotations from the works of other writers as prefatory paratext.

== Personal life ==
Lackington considered himself to have been blessed with two happy marriages, the first to Nancy, who died of fever, then Dorcas. In 1798, Lackington retired to his estate in Gloucestershire and became a part-time Methodist preacher and philanthropist to the Wesleyan cause. It was at this time that he left the Temple of the Muses to his third cousin George Lackington. In 1841, the "Temple of the Muses" was destroyed in a fire and was never rebuilt.

He settled at Budleigh Salterton in 1812 and died there in 1815. He is commemorated by a blue plaque on Temple Methodist Church which he founded.

== Tributes ==
Lackington's Magazine, a Canadian speculative fiction quarterly that keeps content accessible to anyone with an internet connection, is named in honor of James Lackington. Every cover image features a nod to a book hoard and Lackington's era, the eighteenth and nineteenth centuries.
