= George Lackington =

English bookseller and publisher (1777–1844)

George Lackington (1777–1844) was an English bookseller and publisher.

== Life ==
He inherited the business of his distant relation James Lackington, on his retirement in 1798. He had started work in this bookselling business in Chiswell Street, London, at the age of 13; James Lackington was perhaps a third cousin, but George Lackington was usually known as the "nephew". His father was a prosperous coal merchant, and provided his son with the capital to purchase a share in Lackington, Allen, & Co.'s large shop in Finsbury Square. He became head of the firm in 1798.

The first volume of the Lackington's Catalogue, Michaelmas 1799 to Michaelmas 1800, described over 200,000 books; the second volume, which described over 800,000, was issued in 1803. Selling cheaply in large quantities, for cash only, was the business model, but the firm also went into publishing. Besides Lackington, the other members of the firm were Allen, who possessed a great knowledge of books acquired from early training with James Lackington, and Richard Hughes, also lessee of Sadler's Wells. Subsequent partners were A. Kirkman, Mavor, a son of William Fordyce Mavor of Woodstock, and Jones. In 1822 the business was conducted under the name of Lackington, Hughes, Harding, Mavor, & Lepard.

The Egyptian Hall in Piccadilly was bought by Lackington, and let for miscellaneous exhibitions. In his later years he was an official assignee of bankrupts in London. He died at St. John's Wood on 31 March 1844, aged 76.

On the retirement of George Lackington, Joseph Harding became the chief partner, and the business was moved to Pall Mall East by Harding and Lepard. Many well-known booksellers received their training there; the "last of the Lackingtonians", Kanes James Ford, died 11 December 1886, at the age of 94.

== Family ==
He married a daughter of Captain Bullock, R.N., and left two daughters.
