= Gerald Bostock =

Gerald Bostock may refer to:

- A fictional character mentioned in the album packaging of the Jethro Tull album Thick as a Brick as well as the band leader Ian Anderson's solo albums Thick as a Brick 2 and Homo Erraticus
- The plaintiff, Gerald Lynn Bostock, in the landmark United States Supreme Court case Bostock v. Clayton County
