= Bursting Out =

1978 live double album by Jethro Tull

Live: Bursting Out

Live album by Jethro Tull
- Released: 22 September 1978
- Recorded: May–June 1978
- Genre: Progressive rock
- Length: 93:31
- Label: Chrysalis
- Producer: Ian Anderson

Jethro Tull chronology
Heavy Horses (1978)	Live: Bursting Out (1978)	Stormwatch (1979)

Professional ratings
Review scores
Source	Rating
AllMusic	3/5 stars
The Encyclopedia of Popular Music	2/5 stars
Rolling Stone	(mixed+)

Bursting Out (labelled as Live: Bursting Out) is a 1978 live double album by the rock band Jethro Tull. The album was recorded during the band's European Heavy Horses Tour in May/June of that year.

== Background ==
The exact date for every single song has not been made public, but the introduction by Claude Nobs, most of "Flute Solo Improvisation", "Too Old to Rock 'n' Roll: Too Young to Die", "Aqualung", "Locomotive Breath" and "The Dambusters March" were recorded at the Festhalle in Bern, Switzerland, on May 28, 1978. The next two days saw concerts in the Walter Köbel Halle in walking distance of US Army Azbill Barracks in Rüsselsheim, thus the "large percentage of young American boys" greeted at the beginning of "Jack in the Green" was likely there, and not during the following dates in Hannover and Kiel (British zone), in the UK or in the US.

The Bern show was recorded on a 24-track tape recorder, while the rest of the shows were recorded on a TEAC TASCAM 80-8 eight-track recorder. Ian Anderson recalled going through "hours and hours" of recordings in order to select the best takes. Additional sweetening was done at Maison Rouge Studio in June 1978.

== Release ==
A spelling error on the spine of the first US, Canada, Spain and Sweden LP pressings listed the title as "Busting Out".

The album was later re-released as a double-disc CD in the UK and Europe. The original CD release in the United States was only one disc, with three tracks ("Quatrain", "Sweet Dream" and "Conundrum") omitted and some of the stage banter shortened to fit the 80 minutes running length. The double-disc 1990 CD version in the UK and Europe incorporated the first track, the introductions, in the song that followed. In 2004, the complete album was remastered and released worldwide as a two-disc set, with the introductions as separate tracks. A deluxe remixed edition was released June 21, 2024, incorporating new mixes of the Bern tracks that had been missing on the original album (but were released, albeit mixed by Jakko Jakszyk, on the "New Shoes Edition" of Heavy Horses) for a complete representation of the live setlist, previously unreleased soundcheck recordings and a remix of the Live at Madison Square Garden show, the latter also including the filmed footage on DVD.

== Track listing, original two-CD edition ==
All tracks are written by Ian Anderson, except where noted.

Disc one
No.	Title	Writer(s)	Source	Length
1.	"Introduction by Claude Nobs"	Claude Nobs		0:50
2.	"No Lullaby"		Heavy Horses (1978)	4:48
3.	"Sweet Dream"		Non-album single (1969)	6:30
4.	"Skating Away on the Thin Ice of the New Day"		War Child (1974)	4:30
5.	"Jack in the Green"		Songs from the Wood (1977)	3:13
6.	"One Brown Mouse"		Heavy Horses	3:53
7.	"A New Day Yesterday"		Stand Up (1969)	2:27
8.	"Flute Solo Improvisation / God Rest Ye Merry Gentlemen / Bourée" (instrumental medley)	Anderson / Traditional, arr. Anderson / Johann Sebastian Bach, arr. Anderson	Stand Up	6:08
9.	"Songs from the Wood"		Songs from the Wood	2:40
10.	"Thick as a Brick" (excerpts)	Anderson, Gerald Bostock	Thick as a Brick (1972)	12:27

Disc two
No.	Title	Writer(s)	Source	Length
11.	"Introduction by Ian Anderson"			0:43
12.	"Hunting Girl"		Songs from the Wood	5:45
13.	"Too Old to Rock 'n' Roll: Too Young to Die"		Too Old to Rock 'n' Roll: Too Young to Die! (1976)	3:57
14.	"Conundrum" (instrumental)	Martin Barre, Barriemore Barlow	Previously unreleased	6:57
15.	"Minstrel in the Gallery"		Minstrel in the Gallery (1975)	5:41
16.	"Cross-Eyed Mary"		Aqualung (1971)	3:58
17.	"Quatrain" (instrumental)	Barre	Previously unreleased; Heavy Horses outtake	1:33
18.	"Aqualung"	Anderson, Jennie Franks	Aqualung	8:38
19.	"Locomotive Breath"		Aqualung	5:33
20.	"The Dambusters March" (instrumental)	Eric Coates	The Dam Busters film (1955)	3:26

== Personnel ==
- Ian Anderson – vocals, flute, acoustic guitar
- Martin Barre – electric guitar, mandolin, marimba
- John Glascock – bass guitar, additional electric guitar
- John Evan – piano, organ, synthesizers, accordion
- David Palmer – portative organ, synthesizers, saxophone
- Barriemore Barlow – drums, percussion, glockenspiel.

== Charts ==
1978 chart performance for Bursting Out
Chart (1978)	Peak position
Australian Albums (Kent Music Report)	20
Austrian Albums (Ö3 Austria)	16
Canada Top Albums/CDs (RPM)	24
German Albums (Offizielle Top 100)	16
Norwegian Albums (VG-lista)	20
New Zealand Albums (RMNZ)	19
UK Albums (Official Charts)	17
US Billboard 200	21

2024 chart performance for Bursting Out
Chart (2024)	Peak position
Belgian Albums (Ultratop Flanders)	85
Belgian Albums (Ultratop Wallonia)	156
Dutch Albums (Album Top 100)	75
German Albums (Offizielle Top 100)	7
Hungarian Albums (MAHASZ)	32
Swiss Albums (Schweizer Hitparade)	12

== Certifications ==
Region	Certification	Certified units/sales
Canada (Music Canada)	Gold	50,000^{^}
United Kingdom (BPI)	Silver	60,000^{^}
United States (RIAA)	Gold	500,000^{^}
^{^} Shipments figures based on certification alone.
