= Thick as a Brick – Live in Iceland =

Live album by Ian Anderson
- Released: 25 August 2014
- Recorded: 22 June 2012
- Genre: Progressive rock
- Label: Eagle Records

Ian Anderson chronology
Homo Erraticus (2014)	Thick as a Brick – Live in Iceland (2014)	Jethro Tull - The String Quartets (2017)

Professional ratings
Review scores
Source	Rating
AllMusic	3/5 stars

Thick as a Brick – Live in Iceland is a live album and Blu-ray/DVD by Jethro Tull frontman Ian Anderson. The live concert was recorded in Harpa concert hall, Reykjavík, Iceland on 21. June 2012.

It was part of the Thick as a Brick Tour by Ian Anderson and his touring band in Europe and the United States throughout 2012 and 2013.

== Track listing ==
=== Disc one ===
1. Thick as a Brick

=== Disc two ===
1. From a Pebble Thrown
2. Pebbles Instrumental
3. Might Have Beens
4. Upper Sixth Loan Shark
5. Banker Bets, Banker Wins
6. Swing It Far
7. Adrift and Dumfounded
8. Old School Song
9. Wootton Bassett Town
10. Power and Spirit
11. Give Till It Hurts
12. Cosy Corner
13. Shunt and Shuffle
14. A Change Of Horses
15. Confessional
16. Kismet in Suburbia
17. What-ifs, Maybes and Might-have-beens

=== Blu-ray/DVD only ===
1. Interview with Ian Anderson
2. Workshop performance of “Someday The Sun Won’t Shine For You” with Montreux Jazz Festival founder Claude Nobs
3. “Banker Bets, Banker Wins” filmed live at Montreux 2012

== Personnel ==
- Ian Anderson – flute, Steel-string guitar, acoustic guitar, vocals
- Florian Opahle – electric guitar
- David Goodier – bass guitar, glockenspiel
- Anna Phoebe – violin
- John O'Hara – keyboards, accordion
- Scott Hammond – drums, percussion
- Ryan O'Donnell – singing, dance and mime

== See also ==
- Thick as a Brick
- Thick as a Brick 2
