= Kobel =

Kobel (or Koebel, Köbel) is a Swiss-German surname. People with this name include:

- Craig Kobel (born 1982), American football player
- Eberhard Koebel (1907–1955), German youth leader, writer, publisher, tent designer, and Nazi resister
- Gregor Kobel (born 1997), Swiss footballer
- Jacob Köbel (1462–1533), German printer and publisher
- Kevin Kobel (born 1953), American Baseball pitcher
- Maria Kobel (1897–1996), German biochemist
- Peter Kobel (born 1969), Swiss footballer
- Stefan Kobel (born 1974), Swiss beach volleyball player
- Walter Köbel (1918–1965), German politician
