= Joe Parrish =

English guitarist (born 1995)

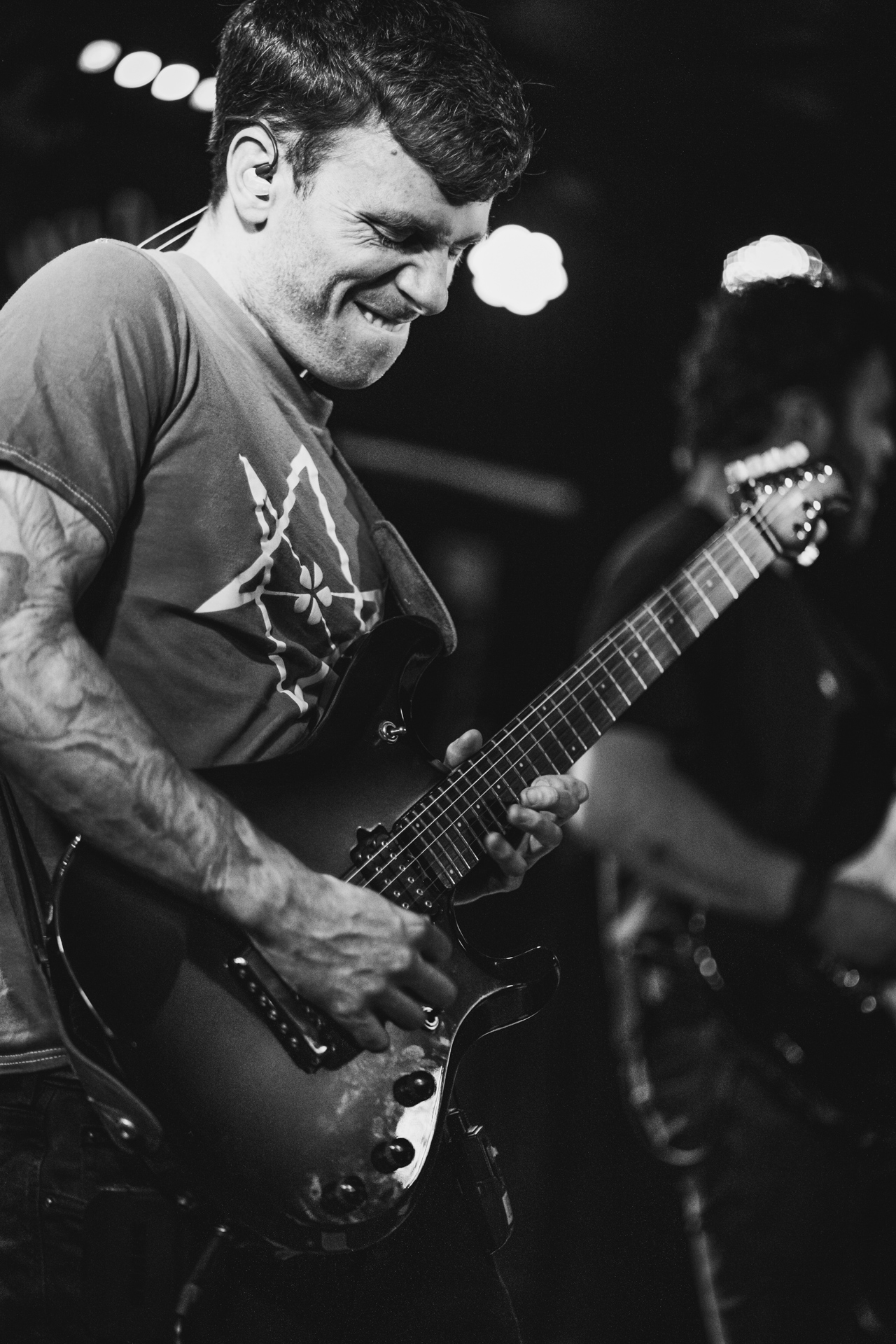
- Parrish with Albion in 2024

Background information
- Born: Joseph Parrish-James; 1995 (age 30–31); Bedfordshire, England
- Genres: Progressive rock, folk rock
- Occupations: Musician, songwriter
- Instruments: Guitar, vocals, flute, mandolin
- Years active: 2019–present
- Label: Chrysalis
- Website: https://www.joeparrishguitar.uk/

Joseph Parrish-James [pəriʃ-dʒeɪmz] (born 1995 in Bedfordshire, England) is a British guitarist of the bands Albion and Jethro Tull.

== Early life and education ==
Parrish found his love for music at the age of three and learned to play the guitar at the age of six. In his childhood, he listened to Deep Purple, Steeleye Span, and later Iron Maiden. Joe studied composition and arrangement at the London College of Music.

== Career ==
After graduating, Parrish arranged and composed for classical ensembles (orchestra and string quartet). His biggest influences are Vaughan Williams, Warlock, Dmitri Shostakovich and Igor Stravinsky.

Parrish joined Jethro Tull as their lead guitarist in 2019, succeeding Florian Opahle. He played on one track of The Zealot Gene (2022) and all tracks of RökFlöte (2023).

Parrish is also the singer, guitarist, flute player and songwriter of his own folk rock band Albion. In March 2024, he left Jethro Tull to focus on Albion.

== Style and equipment ==
His first electric guitar at age 11 was a Yamaha Pacifica. Later, he switched to a John Petrucci 6 Musicman guitar. He has also used a Schecter Diamond Series 7 String and Ibanez Parlour Acoustic. Amplifiers have included a Blackstar, an ID:100 TVP, and a POD XT. In addition to guitar, he plays mandolin and flute, and also sings.

== Discography ==
Albion

- Pryderi (2021)
- Lakesongs Of Elbid (2024)
- It Was In The Month Of May I (2026)

Jethro Tull

- The Zealot Gene (2022)
- RökFlöte (2023)
