= The Zealot Gene =

Studio album by Jethro Tull
- Released: 28 January 2022
- Recorded: March 2017–July 2021
- Studios: Modern World Studios, Tetbury, Gloucestershire
- Genres: Folk; progressive rock
- Length: 46:45
- Label: InsideOut
- Producer: Ian Anderson

Jethro Tull chronology
The Jethro Tull Christmas Album (2003)	The Zealot Gene (2022)	RökFlöte (2023)

Singles from The Zealot Gene
- 1. "Shoshana Sleeping" Released: 5 November 2021; 2. "Sad City Sisters" Released: 8 December 2021; 3. "The Zealot Gene" Released: 12 January 2022

The Zealot Gene is the twenty-second studio album by the British rock band Jethro Tull, released on 28 January 2022 by Inside Out Music. Nearly five years in production, it is their first studio album since The Jethro Tull Christmas Album (2003), and their first of all original material since J-Tull Dot Com (1999), marking the longest gap between the band's studio albums. It is also their first album since This Was (1968) without guitarist Martin Barre.

The album entered the UK Albums Chart at number 9, becoming Jethro Tull's first UK top ten album since 1972.

== Background ==
The album originated in January 2017, when composer, vocalist and flautist Ian Anderson started to write new songs and arrange the shape of the album. Early into the process, he decided that it was to be a Jethro Tull album because the line-up of the group at that time had become the longest lasting in its history, but had not been involved on a studio recording under its name. It was a productive time, and seven tracks were recorded in March of that year. Further work on the album was put on hold in order for Anderson and the band to finish touring commitments in 2018 and 2019, and Anderson felt it would have been unfair to have the group back in the studio during the small amounts of down time. Following the outbreak of the COVID-19 pandemic and subsequent lockdowns, in early 2021 Anderson "gave up hope" and decided to put down his parts to the remaining five songs alone at his home studio. These last five songs are acoustic based and without drums, partly because drummer Scott Hammond was unable to record at home. The band recorded their individual parts in a similar manner, leaving Anderson to assemble the various tracks to form a complete song. By July 2021, the album was complete and delivered to Inside Out.

The Zealot Gene is the first Jethro Tull studio album to feature an entirely new lineup (other than Anderson), with guitarist Florian Opahle (who left the band between its recording and release), bassist David Goodier, keyboardist John O'Hara, and drummer Scott Hammond replacing four-fifths of The Jethro Tull Christmas Album lineup – Martin Barre, Jonathan Noyce, Andrew Giddings and Doane Perry respectively. The new lineup is the same that performed on Anderson's most recent solo album, Homo Erraticus (2014). The album is the first since This Was (1968) not to involve Barre in any capacity, as he was not asked to return when Anderson reformed Jethro Tull.

== Songs ==
The Zealot Gene is not a concept album, but biblical references are made throughout and Anderson began writing each song with a passage from the Bible. "Mrs. Tibbets" references the mother of Paul Tibbets, the pilot of the Enola Gay who dropped the atomic bomb Little Boy on Hiroshima in 1945; the song's repeated reference to "Mrs. Tibbets's little boy" therefore has a dual meaning. The title track was inspired partly by the rise in right-wing populism "and how extremist views seem to spread more freely and everything gets more exaggerated – sometimes through news stories, and some from ferocious tweets." Anderson said that "Mine Is the Mountain" is not a reflection of his own view, but rather about seeing God as a victim and the "desperation of man to create this figurehead, and in human form, because that’s the only way we can understand it."

== Release ==
The album entered the UK Albums Chart at number 9, becoming Jethro Tull's first UK top ten album since Thick as a Brick and the compilation Living in the Past, both from 1972.

== Critical reception ==
Professional ratings
Aggregate scores
Source	Rating
Metacritic	67/100
Review scores
Source	Rating
American Songwriter	3.5/5 stars
Classic Rock	3/5 stars
Mojo	3/5 stars
The Spill Magazine	4.5/5 stars
Uncut	7/10

At Metacritic, which assigns a normalised rating out of 100 to reviews from mainstream critics, The Zealot Gene received a mean score of 67 based on 4 reviews, indicating "generally favourable reviews".

Lee Zimmerman of American Songwriter described The Zealot Gene as a "concept album in the vintage manner of Thick as a Brick" with the "idyllic imagery of Songs From the Wood and Heavy Horses". Zimmerman opined that the album is a "noteworthy effort and a well-executed return" for the band. Mojo writer John Bungey compared the album with Ian Anderson's 2014 solo album Homo Erraticus, and praised that "here are 12 less erratic songs on diverse subjects". However, Bungey also pointed out that "the rockier tunes need louder guitars and it's the folkier moments with mandolin, Irish whistle and accordion that shine brightest". Hugh Fielder of Classic Rock described the album as "light, bright, tight and recognisably Tull, with plenty of room for [Anderson's] flute to fly". However, Fielder also stated that he missed Martin Barre's "heavy rock dynamics" and mentioned "Anderson's increasingly frail voice".

== Track listing ==
All music and lyrics by Ian Anderson.

No.	Title	Length
1.	"Mrs. Tibbets"	5:53
2.	"Jacob's Tales"	2:12
3.	"Mine Is the Mountain"	5:40
4.	"The Zealot Gene"	3:54
5.	"Shoshana Sleeping"	3:40
6.	"Sad City Sisters"	3:41
7.	"Barren Beth, Wild Desert John"	3:38
8.	"The Betrayal of Joshua Kynde"	4:05
9.	"Where Did Saturday Go?"	3:52
10.	"Three Loves, Three"	3:29
11.	"In Brief Visitation"	3:01
12.	"The Fisherman of Ephesus"	3:40
Total length:		46:45

== Personnel ==
Jethro Tull

- Ian Anderson – vocals, flute, acoustic guitar, mandolin, whistle, harmonica
- Florian Opahle – electric guitar
- David Goodier – bass guitar
- John O'Hara – piano, keyboards, accordion, organ
- Scott Hammond – drums
- Joe Parrish – guitar (track 11)

Production

- Ian Anderson – producer, stereo mixing, photography, artwork concept
- Michael Nyandoro – engineer
- Nick Watson – mastering
- Jakko Jakszyk – 5.1 surround sound mixing
- James Anderson – photography
- Thomas Ewerhard – artwork design
- Tim Bowness – liner notes
- Mastering at Fluid Mastering

== Charts ==
Chart performance for The Zealot Gene
Chart (2022)	Peak position
Austrian Albums (Ö3 Austria)	5
Belgian Albums (Ultratop Flanders)	26
Belgian Albums (Ultratop Wallonia)	34
Czech Albums (ČNS IFPI)	56
Dutch Albums (Album Top 100)	37
Finnish Albums (Suomen virallinen lista)	6
French Albums (SNEP)	124
German Albums (Offizielle Top 100)	4
Hungarian Albums (MAHASZ)	18
Italian Albums (FIMI)	61
Polish Albums (ZPAV)	34
Portuguese Albums (AFP)	8
Scottish Albums (Official Charts)	5
Spanish Albums (Promusicae)	20
Swedish Albums (Sverigetopplistan)	22
Swiss Albums (Schweizer Hitparade)	3
UK Albums (Official Charts)	9
UK Rock & Metal Albums (Official Charts)	3
US Independent Albums (Billboard)	37
US Top Album Sales (Billboard)	10
US Top Rock Albums (Billboard)	37
