= RökFlöte =

Studio album by Jethro Tull
- Released: 21 April 2023
- Genre: Folk rock; progressive rock
- Length: 44:47
- Label: Inside Out Music
- Producer: Ian Anderson

Jethro Tull chronology
The Zealot Gene (2022)	RökFlöte (2023)	Curious Ruminant (2025)

Singles from RökFlöte
- 1. "Ginnungagap" Released: 20 January 2023; 2. "The Navigators" Released: 22 February 2023; 3. "Hammer on Hammer" Released: 5 April 2023

RökFlöte is the twenty-third studio album by the British progressive rock band Jethro Tull, released on 21 April 2023.

In contrast to its predecessor, The Zealot Gene (2022), RökFlöte marks the shortest gap between two Jethro Tull albums since Stormwatch (1979) and A (1980).

== Background ==
On 17 November 2022, on Jethro Tull's Facebook page, Ian Anderson announced that they were working on their next studio album and that it would be released in Spring of 2023 with several different mix formats. The album mostly revolves around the characters, roles, and principal gods in Norse Paganism, as well as "Rock Flute". The name of the album comes from "Rock Flute" as the original idea was to make an album of mostly instrumental flute music. But eventually Ian Anderson stated that he was drawn to the phrase Ragnarök with "rök" meaning destiny, course, or direction. Anderson would then change "Flute" to "Flöte" to "keep with the spelling". The album was released as a double LP, CD, and Blu-ray as well as a deluxe edition featuring bonus demos, an interview with Ian Anderson, and a bonus track.

== Critical reception ==
Professional ratings
Aggregate scores
Source	Rating
Metacritic	61/100
Review scores
Source	Rating
Louder Sound	4/5 stars
The Spill Magazine	4.5/5 stars
Riff Magazine	6/10
Markus' Heavy Music Blog	9/10
The Telegraph	2/5 stars

== Track listing ==
All music and lyrics by Ian Anderson.

RökFlöte track listing
No.	Title	Length
1.	"Voluspo"	3:43
2.	"Ginnungagap"	3:49
3.	"Allfather"	2:46
4.	"The Feathered Consort"	3:40
5.	"Hammer on Hammer"	3:09
6.	"Wolf Unchained"	4:58
7.	"The Perfect One"	3:51
8.	"Trickster (And the Mistletoe)"	3:01
9.	"Cornucopia"	3:53
10.	"The Navigators"	4:27
11.	"Guardian's Watch"	3:30
12.	"Ithavoll"	4:00
Total length:		44:47

Digital bonus track
No.	Title	Length
13.	"The Navigators" (single edit)	3:24
Total length:		48:11

== Personnel ==
Jethro Tull

- Ian Anderson – vocals, concert flutes, alto flutes, flute d'amour, Irish whistle, production, mixing, engineering
- Joe Parrish – electric guitars, acoustic guitars, mandolin
- David Goodier – bass guitar
- John O'Hara – piano, keyboards, Hammond organ
- Scott Hammond – drums

Additional personnel

- Unnur Birna – spoken vocals (tracks 1, 12)

Technical

- Nick Watson – mastering

== Charts ==
Chart performance for RökFlöte
Chart (2023)	Peak position
Austrian Albums (Ö3 Austria)	4
Belgian Albums (Ultratop Flanders)	21
Belgian Albums (Ultratop Wallonia)	53
Dutch Albums (Album Top 100)	47
Finnish Albums (Suomen virallinen lista)	21
French Albums (SNEP)	132
German Albums (Offizielle Top 100)	4
Hungarian Albums (MAHASZ)	15
Italian Albums (FIMI)	59
Norwegian Albums (VG-lista)	36
Polish Albums (ZPAV)	39
Portuguese Albums (AFP)	27
Scottish Albums (OCC)	7
Spanish Albums (Promusicae)	43
Swiss Albums (Schweizer Hitparade)	3
UK Albums (OCC)	17
UK Rock & Metal Albums (OCC)	4
US Top Album Sales (Billboard)	33
