= Scott Hammond (musician) =

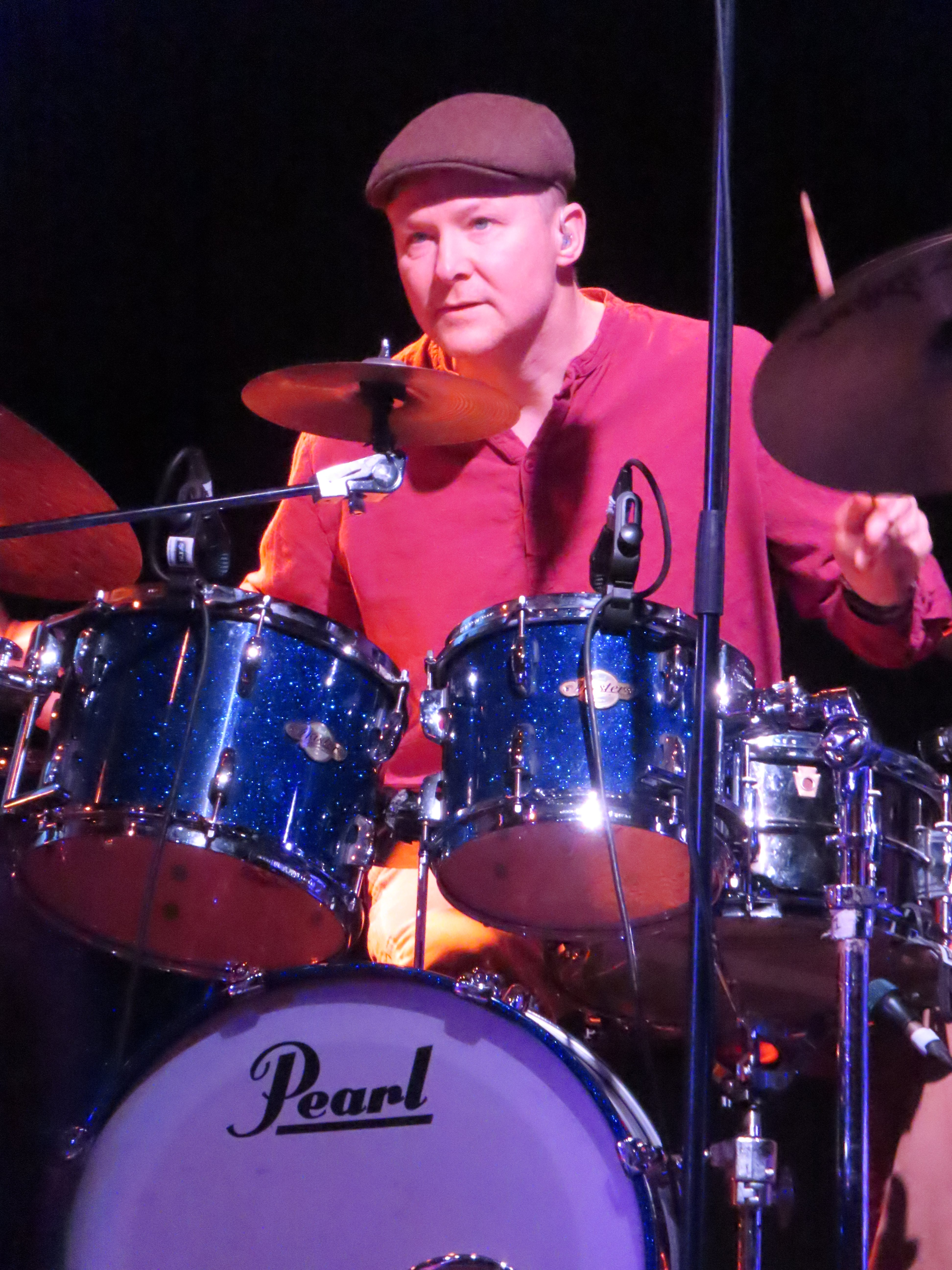
- Hammond performing in 2024

Background information
- Born: 4 June 1973 (age 53); Bristol, England
- Genres: Progressive rock; folk rock; hard rock; blues rock; pop; jazz
- Occupation: Musician
- Instrument: Drums
- Years active: 1996–present
- Member of: Jethro Tull; Ian Anderson band
- Website: www.scotthammond.co.uk

Scott Hammond (born 4 June 1973) is an English drummer. He plays with Ian Anderson (the leader and frontman of British Rock band Jethro Tull) and also tours with Jethro Tull itself and has recorded on several of the band's albums. He has been described as a "Jazz drummer with rock influences".

== Early years ==
Hammond was born in Bristol, England, UK. He started to learn the drums when he was 14 years old and later studied at The City of Leeds College of Music for three years, and also with Dave Hassell for two years.

== Ian Anderson ==
Since April 2010 Hammond has primarily been touring internationally with Ian Anderson, rock flautist of Jethro Tull. Recordings with Ian Anderson have included Thick As a Brick 2 album (released in April 2012) - the sequel to Jethro Tull's 1972 album Thick As A Brick. Hammond's touring with the band has included the "Thick As A Brick" 2012/13 world tour, the 2014/15 Homo Erraticus world tour, Jethro Tull - The Rock Opera and Jethro Tull's 50th Anniversary tour in 2018.

Scott Hammond playing live in USA with Ian Anderson 2010

== Jethro Tull ==
In March 2011 Hammond toured with Jethro Tull in Ireland. This tour featured Martin Barre on guitar, David Goodier on bass, John O'Hara on keyboards and Ian Anderson on flute, guitar and vocals. From 2017 he is in a new line-up of Jethro Tull.

Hammond said in an interview: "I wouldn't describe myself as a prog rock drummer although it's obviously a part of what I do. My rock roots are based in bands like Deep Purple although I have always enjoyed listening to Jethro Tull's Minstrel in the Gallery since I was a teenager."

In the book "The Ballad of Jethro Tull", Hammond said "What attracted me (to Jethro Tull) was the variation in dynamics and the quirky arrangements. It was exciting."

Hammond's first studio album with Jethro Tull, The Zealot Gene, was released on 28 January 2022. He also played on Jethro Tull's 23rd album RökFlöte which was released on April 21, 2023. On Jethro Tull's 2025 album Curious Ruminant, he plays on two tracks.

== Freelance career ==
The majority of Hammond's working life has been jazz and funk based. He plays regularly with his own band JINGU BANG and also with the jazz organ trio The Hopkins-Hammond Trio. Other artists he has worked with include Ruth Hammond, Bruce Dickinson, Greg Lake, Justin Hayward, Tina May, Gilbert O'Sullivan, Herb Geller, Bobby Wellins, Pee Wee Ellis, Phil King and Limahl. More recently Hammond has featured on four albums by UK based trumpeter Ben Thomas with Thomas & Muse.

Hammond was voted 5th best rock drummer in the world in the 2022 MusicRadar Awards (public vote)

== Discography ==
Year	Artist	Title	Type	Label	Peak chart position		
Year	Artist	Title	Type	Label	US	UK	Germany
2002	Ruth Hammond	All The Good Things	Studio Album	Tenterhook Records			
2006	Gary Bamford	JADJ	Studio Album	Kintu Records			
2006	The Forster King Band	Keep The Music Playing	Studio Album	Unsigned			
2007	Ilya	Somerset	Studio Album	CDBY			
2008	Azhar Saffar	Out There	Studio Album	33 Jazz			
2008	Denny Ilett	Calling The Children Home	Studio Album	Nugene			
2009	Phil King	They Come And They Go	Studio Album	Ragtag Records			
2009	Thomas & Muse	We All Fall Down	Studio Album	mtheart			
2011	Thomas & Muse	Dark Scrawls	Studio Album	safehouse			
2011	Colman Brothers	Another Brother	7" single	Wah Wah 45s			
2011	Colman Brothers	Colman Brothers	Studio Album	Wah Wah 45s			
2012	Ian Anderson	Thick As a Brick 2	Studio Album	Chrysalis/EMI Records	55	35	13
2013	Thomas & Muse	Within This World Within My Mind	Studio Album	Safe House			
2014	Ian Anderson	Homo Erraticus	Studio Album	Kscope		14	13
2014	Ian Anderson	Thick as a Brick - Live in Iceland	Live Album	Eagle Records			
2015	Thomas & Muse	Dead Horses and Divorces	Studio Album	Safe House			
2018	Gary Alesbrook	Jazz In The Movies	Studio Album	Gary Alesbrook			
2022	Jethro Tull	The Zealot Gene	Studio Album	InsideOutMusic	10	9	4
2023	Jethro Tull	RökFlöte	Studio Album	InsideOutMusic	24	17	4
2025	Jethro Tull	Curious Ruminant	Studio Album	InsideOutMusic		25	2
