= Curious Ruminant =

Studio album by Jethro Tull
- Released: 7 March 2025
- Genres: Progressive rock, folk rock
- Length: 50:31
- Label: InsideOut
- Producer: Ian Anderson

Jethro Tull chronology
RökFlöte (2023)	Curious Ruminant (2025)

Singles from Curious Ruminant
- 1. "Curious Ruminant" Released: 10 January 2025; 2. "The Tipu House" Released: 6 February 2025

Curious Ruminant is the twenty-fourth studio album by the British progressive rock band Jethro Tull, released on 7 March 2025.

== Track listing ==
All music and lyrics by Ian Anderson.

Curious Ruminant track listing
No.	Title	Length
1.	"Puppet and the Puppet Master"	4:00
2.	"Curious Ruminant"	5:56
3.	"Dunsinane Hill"	4:14
4.	"The Tipu House"	3:29
5.	"Savannah of Paddington Green"	3:11
6.	"Stygian Hand"	4:13
7.	"Over Jerusalem"	5:54
8.	"Drink from the Same Well"	16:39
9.	"Interim Sleep"	2:27

== Personnel ==
Credits adapted from the album's liner notes.

=== Jethro Tull ===
- Ian Anderson – flutes, vocals, acoustic guitar, tenor guitar, mandolin, production, mixing, artwork photography, artwork concept
- David Goodier – bass guitar
- John O'Hara – piano, keyboards, accordion
- Jack Clark – electric guitar
- Scott Hammond – drums

=== Guest musicians ===
- James Duncan – drums, cajón, percussion
- Andrew Giddings – piano, keyboards, accordion

=== Additional contributors ===
- Nick Watson – mastering
- Bruce Soord – surround mixing, alternative stereo mixing
- Steve Kitch – surround mastering
- Mike Downs – engineering (tracks 1–3, 7)
- James Anderson – engineering (tracks 4–6)
- Thomas Ewerhard – artwork layout, design

== Charts ==
Chart performance for Curious Ruminant
Chart (2025)	Peak position
Austrian Albums (Ö3 Austria)	4
Belgian Albums (Ultratop Flanders)	38
Belgian Albums (Ultratop Wallonia)	38
Croatian International Albums (HDU)	6
Dutch Albums (Album Top 100)	42
French Albums (SNEP)	135
German Albums (Offizielle Top 100)	2
Portuguese Albums (AFP)	40
Spanish Albums (Promusicae)	31
Swedish Albums (Sverigetopplistan)	58
Swiss Albums (Schweizer Hitparade)	5
UK Albums (Official Charts)	25
