= Ian Anderson Plays the Orchestral Jethro Tull =

Live album by Ian Anderson
- Released: 6 June 2005 (DE)
- Recorded: 8 December 2004
- Genre: Symphonic rock, progressive rock
- Length: 102:32
- Label: ZYX Music
- Producer: Ian Anderson

Ian Anderson chronology
| Rupi's Dance (2003) | Ian Anderson Plays the Orchestral Jethro Tull (2005) | Thick As a Brick 2 (2012) |

Professional ratings
Review scores
| Source | Rating |
|---|---|
| Allmusic | 3.5/5 stars |

Ian Anderson Plays the Orchestral Jethro Tull is a live album and DVD by Jethro Tull frontman Ian Anderson, featuring the Neue Philharmonie Frankfurt, conducted by John O'Hara. The DVD was recorded at the Rosengarten in Mannheim on 8 December 2004.

The concert was part of a series of the same name. Anderson, O'Hara, and the orchestra toured Europe and the United States throughout 2004 and 2006.

== Track listing ==
Note: track layout and timings for the double CD. The DVD contains the same songs in the same order, however the durations vary slightly.

=== Disc one ===
1. "Eurology" ( Instrumental) – 3:30
2. "Calliandra Shade (The Cappuccino Song)" – 5:42
3. "Skating Away on the Thin Ice of the New Day" – 4:03
4. "Up the Pool" – 3:22
5. "We Five Kings" (Instrumental) – 3:32
6. "Life Is a Long Song" – 3:34
7. "In the Grip of Stronger Stuff" (Instrumental) – 3:02
8. "Wond'ring Aloud" – 2:11
9. "Griminelli's Lament" (Instrumental) – 3:10
10. "Cheap Day Return" – 1:27
11. "Mother Goose" – 5:46
12. "Bourée" (Instrumental) (J. S. Bach arr. Jethro Tull)" – 5:17
13. "Boris Dancing" (Instrumental) – 3:31
14. "Living in the Past" – 4:48

=== Disc two ===
1. "Pavane" (Instrumental) – 4:37
2. "Aqualung" – 10:24
3. "God Rest Ye Merry Gentlemen" (Instrumental) – 4:58
4. "My God" – 8:52
5. "Budapest" – 14:04
6. "Locomotive Breath" – 6:42

=== DVD only ===
- Interview Ian Anderson – 48:00
- Interview Fritz Rau – 7:00
- Interview participants – 9:00

== Credits ==
- Ian Anderson - flute, bamboo flute, acoustic guitar, vocals
- Florian Opahle - acoustic and electric guitar
- David Goodier - bass guitar, glockenspiel
- John O'Hara - keyboards, accordion
- James Duncan - drums, percussion
- Neue Philharmonie Frankfurt: Conducted by John O'Hara

=== Solo ===
- Kathrin Troester - flute
- Astrid Cienia - oboe
- Sibylle Wähnert - bassoon

== See also ==
- A Classic Case
- Jethro Tull - The String Quartets
- Living with the Past
- Nothing Is Easy: Live at the Isle of Wight 1970

== Notes ==
- U.S. CD and DVD released October 4, 2005
