= Ryan O'Donnell =

- Born: 20 November 1982 (age 43); Halifax, West Yorkshire, England
- Genres: Progressive rock, rock, musical
- Occupations: Actor; singer; dancer
- Instrument: Vocals
- Years active: 2002–present
- Label: Chrysalis Records
- Website: https://www.facebook.com/ODonnell82/

Ryan O'Donnell (born 20 November 1982) is an English singer.

== Biography ==
Ryan O'Donnell was born in Halifax, West Yorkshire, England and grew up in Germany. After earning a degree in animation at the Surrey Art Institute he joined the metal band 2 Degree Field as a singer and guitarist. The band broke up when all the members finished college. He then went to study acting at the Royal Welsh College of Music and Drama, where he met his mentor, the conductor John O'Hara.

After University, O'Donnell began an acting career, working briefly in the theater and in the circus, until he broke his leg in 2006, preventing him from working for nine months. After a full recovery, he entered the Royal Shakespeare Company, joining the production of Romeo and Juliet, and later landed the role of Jimmy in the theatrical production of Quadrophenia. On that occasion, he returned to meet John O'Hara, who had organised the musical arrangement of Quadrophenia. Then he collaborated with Cat Stevens in a duet with the British singer in the song "Matthew and Son".

In 2012, he participated in the making of Ian Anderson's album Thick as a Brick 2, sequel to the historical Jethro Tull's album Thick as a Brick (1972). In 2014, O'Donnell was present again in the sixth solo album by Anderson, Homo Erraticus. And on that same year, he was featured on Ian Anderson's Thick as a Brick - Live in Iceland album.

In 2015, O'Donnell joined the West End cast of Sunny Afternoon, as an understudy for both the role of Ray Davies and Dave Davies. After the cast change he also became alternate for the role of Ray Davies, only to take on the role full-time in the Sunny Afternoon UK Tour in 2016. In 2023, he played Pontius Pilate on the UK tour of Jesus Christ Superstar.

== Discography ==
- Thick as a Brick 2 (2012)
- Homo Erraticus (2014)
- Thick as a Brick - Live in Iceland (2014)
