= Jethro Tull – The String Quartets =

Studio album by Ian Anderson and the Carducci String Quartet
- Released: 24 March 2017
- Recorded: September 2016
- Genre: Symphonic rock, progressive rock
- Length: 48:03
- Label: BMG
- Producer: Ian Anderson

Ian Anderson chronology
Thick as a Brick - Live in Iceland (2014)	Jethro Tull – The String Quartets (2017)

Jethro Tull – The String Quartets is a studio album featuring Ian Anderson, John O'Hara and the Carducci String Quartet, arranged by O'Hara. It was released on 24 March 2017.

== CD track listing ==
1. "In the Past (Living in the Past)" – 4:10
2. "Sossity Waiting (Sossity, You're a Woman/Reasons for Waiting)" – 4:45
3. "Bungle (Bungle in the Jungle)" – 3:49
4. "We Used to Bach (We Used to Know/Bach Prelude C Major)" – 4:54
5. "Farm, the Fourway (Farm on the Freeway)" – 3:44
6. "Songs and Horses (Songs from the Wood/Heavy Horses)" – 3:53
7. "Only the Giving (Wond'ring Aloud)" – 1:58
8. "Loco (Locomotive Breath)" – 4:33
9. "Pass the Bottle (A Christmas Song)" – 3:02
10. "Velvet Gold (Velvet Green)" – 4:06
11. "Ring Out These Bells (Ring Out, Solstice Bells)" – 3:56
12. "Aquafugue (Aqualung)" – 5:13

== Vinyl track listing ==
1. "In the Past (Living in the Past)" – 4:10
2. "Sossity Waiting (Sossity, You're a Woman/Reasons for Waiting)" – 4:45
3. "Bungle (Bungle in the Jungle)" – 3:49
4. "Ring Out These Bells (Ring Out, Solstice Bells)" – 3:56
5. "Farm, the Fourway (Farm on the Freeway)" – 3:44
6. "We Used to Bach (We Used to Know/Bach Prelude C Major)" – 4:54
7. "Velvet Gold (Velvet Green)" – 4:06
8. "Pass the Bottle (A Christmas Song)" – 3:02
9. "Loco (Locomotive Breath)" – 4:33
10. "Only the Giving (Wond'ring Aloud)" – 1:58
11. "Songs and Horses (Songs from the Wood/Heavy Horses)" – 3:53
12. "Aquafugue (Aqualung)" – 5:13

== Personnel ==
- Matthew Denton – violin
- Michelle Fleming – violin
- Eoin Schmidt-Martin – viola
- Emma Denton – cello
- Ian Anderson – flute, vocals, acoustic guitar, mandolin
- John O'Hara – orchestral arrangements, celesta, piano

== Charts ==
Chart (2017)	Peak position
Austrian Albums (Ö3 Austria)	50
German Albums (Offizielle Top 100)	57
Italian Albums (FIMI)	57
Scottish Albums (OCC)	41
UK Albums (OCC)	56

== See also ==
- A Classic Case
- Ian Anderson Plays the Orchestral Jethro Tull
