= Otti Geschka =

German nurse and politician (born 1939)

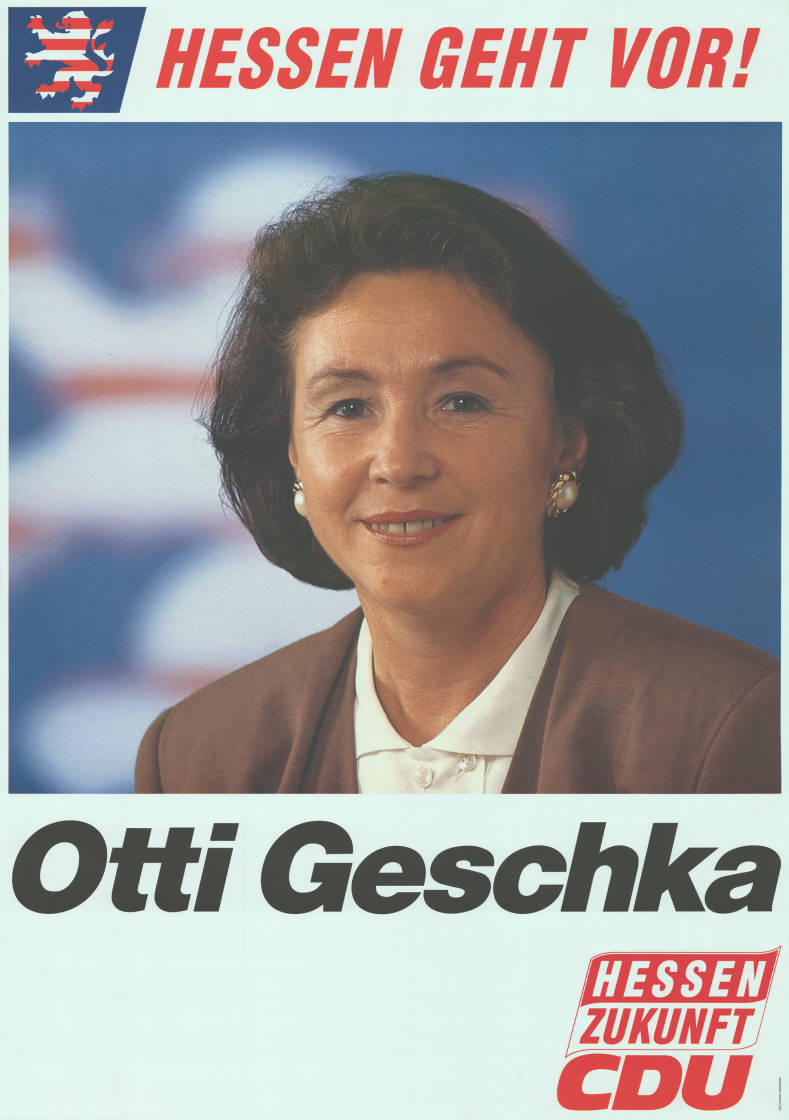

Mayor of Rüsselsheim
- In office 18 July 1993 – 1999

Member of the Parliament of Hesse
- In office 1978–1987
- In office 1991–1993

Personal details
- Born: Ottilie Bördner; 27 December 1939 (age 86) Selters-Haintchen, Germany
- Party: Christian Democratic Union
- Spouse: Horst Geschka
- Children: 2
- Occupation: Pediatric nurse

Otti Geschka (born Ottilie Bördner; 27 December 1939) is a German pediatric nurse and politician. Being a member of the Christian Democratic Union (CDU) she was elected as the first female mayor of Rüsselsheim, Hesse, in 1993 and was in office until 1999. She also served in the Parliament of Hesse representing CDU for two terms.

== Early life and education ==
She was born Ottile Bördner in Selters-Haintchen on 27 December 1939. She was trained as a pediatric nurse between 1955 and 1957.

== Career ==
Following her graduation she worked as a nurse at the University Hospital in Mainz. In 1968 Geschka joined the CDU and became a member of the municipal council in Bauschheim. In two periods between 1978 and 1987 and between 1991 and 1993 she was a member of the Parliament of Hesse. On 18 July 1993 she was elected as the mayor of Rüsselsheim being the first woman to hold the post. Geschka's tenure ended in 1999. From 2000 to 2001 she was the general secretary of the CDU in the Hesse region.

== Personal life ==
Geschka is married to Horst Geschka who is a retired academic and has two children. They live in Darmstadt. She is the recipient of the Elisabeth Selbert Prize in 2013 and Alfred Dregger Medal in Gold in 2014.
