= Thick as a Brick 2 =

2012 album by Ian Anderson

Studio album by Ian Anderson
- Released: 2 April 2012
- Recorded: March 2011, November 2011
- Genre: Progressive rock
- Length: 53:45
- Labels: Chrysalis; EMI
- Producer: Ian Anderson

Ian Anderson chronology
Ian Anderson Plays the Orchestral Jethro Tull (2005)	Thick as a Brick 2 (2012)	Homo Erraticus (2014)

Thick as a Brick 2, abbreviated TAAB 2 and subtitled Whatever Happened to Gerald Bostock?, is the fifth studio album by Jethro Tull frontman Ian Anderson, released in 2012 as a sequel album to Thick as a Brick, Jethro Tull's 1972 parody concept album. It entered the Billboard chart at No. 55.

== Concept overview ==
According to Anderson, TAAB 2 (which he pronounces /tæb ˈtuː/) focuses on Gerald Bostock, the fictional boy genius author of the original album, forty years later. "I wonder what the eight-year-old Gerald Bostock would be doing today. Would the fabled newspaper still exist?" The follow-up album presents five divergent, hypothetical life stories for Gerald Bostock, including a greedy investment banker, a homosexual homeless man, a soldier in the Afghan War, a sanctimonious evangelist preacher, and a most ordinary man who (married and childless) runs a corner store; by the end of the album, however, all five possibilities seem to converge in a similar concluding moment of gloomy or pitiful solitude. In March 2012, to follow the style of the mock-newspaper cover (The St Cleve Chronicle and Linwell Advertiser) of the original Thick as a Brick album, an online newspaper was set up, simply titled StCleve.

== Reception ==
Professional ratings
Review scores
Source	Rating
AllMusic	3/5 stars
PopMatters	5/10
Sputnik Music	4.0/5

AllMusic gave three stars to the album, calling it: "cleaner and streamlined, not as indulgent or idealistic as [Anderson's] younger work, boasting a more sensible structure, yet it still bears all of his signatures from the flute to rambling folk-rock".

The album debuted at No. 55 on the Billboard chart, at No. 13 in the German Albums Chart, at No. 12 in the Finnish Album Chart, at No. 19 in the Austrian Album Charts, at No. 30 in the Norwegian Album Charts, at No. 31 in the Swiss Album Charts, at number No. 74 on the Canadian Albums Chart, at No. 35 on the UK charts, at No. 76 in the Dutch Album Chart and at No. 99 on the Spanish charts.

== Live performances ==
Anderson performed the entire album live on tour in 2012. In August 2014, Jethro Tull's Ian Anderson released CD/DVD/Blu-ray Thick as a Brick - Live in Iceland. The concert was recorded in Reykjavík, Iceland on 22 June 2012 and featured complete Thick as a Brick and Thick as a Brick 2 performances by the Ian Anderson Touring Band.

== Track listing ==
The original Thick as a Brick consists of only two long tracks comprising a single song, while TAAB 2 lists 17 separate songs merged into 13 distinct tracks (some labelled as medleys), although also all flowing together much like a single song.

All tracks are written by Ian Anderson.

No.	Title	Length
1.	"From a Pebble Thrown"	3:05
2.	"Medley: Pebbles Instrumental / Might-Have-Beens"	4:21
3.	"Medley: Upper Sixth Loan Shark / Banker Bets, Banker Wins"	5:41
4.	"Swing It Far"	3:28
5.	"Adrift and Dumfounded"	4:25
6.	"Old School Song"	3:07
7.	"Wootton Bassett Town"	3:44
8.	"Medley: Power and Spirit / Give Till It Hurts"	3:11
9.	"Medley: Cosy Corner / Shunt and Shuffle"	3:37
10.	"A Change of Horses"	8:04
11.	"Confessional"	3:09
12.	"Kismet in Suburbia"	4:17
13.	"What-ifs, Maybes and Might-Have-Beens"	3:36
Total length:		53:45

== DVD ==
The 2-disc edition includes a DVD-9 with the following contents:

- Audio:
  - 5.1 Surround Mix
  - Super Quality 24-bit Stereo Mix
- Video:
  - TAAB2 "The making of" Video
  - Studio recording sessions, interviews and more
  - The Lyric Reading Video (Anderson)
- DVD-ROM:
  - Multilingual Lyric Translations (pdf files)
  - www.StCleve.com Web Pages (pdf)

== Personnel ==
Musicians

- Ian Anderson – vocals, flutes, acoustic guitars
- Florian Opahle – electric guitar
- John O'Hara – accordion, Hammond organ, piano, keyboards
- Pete Judge – trumpet, flugelhorn, tenor horn, E-flat tuba
- Ryan O'Donnell – additional vocals
- David Goodier – bass guitar, glockenspiel
- Scott Hammond – drums, percussion

Production

- Steven Wilson – mixing engineer
- Mike Downs – recording engineer
- Ian Anderson – liner notes
- Peter Mew – mastering engineer

== Charts ==
Chart (2012)	Peak position
Billboard Top 200	55
Top Rock Albums	18
UK Albums Chart	35
Hungarian Albums Chart	2

== See also ==
- Thick as a Brick
- Thick as a Brick - Live in Iceland
