= Florian Opahle =

German guitarist

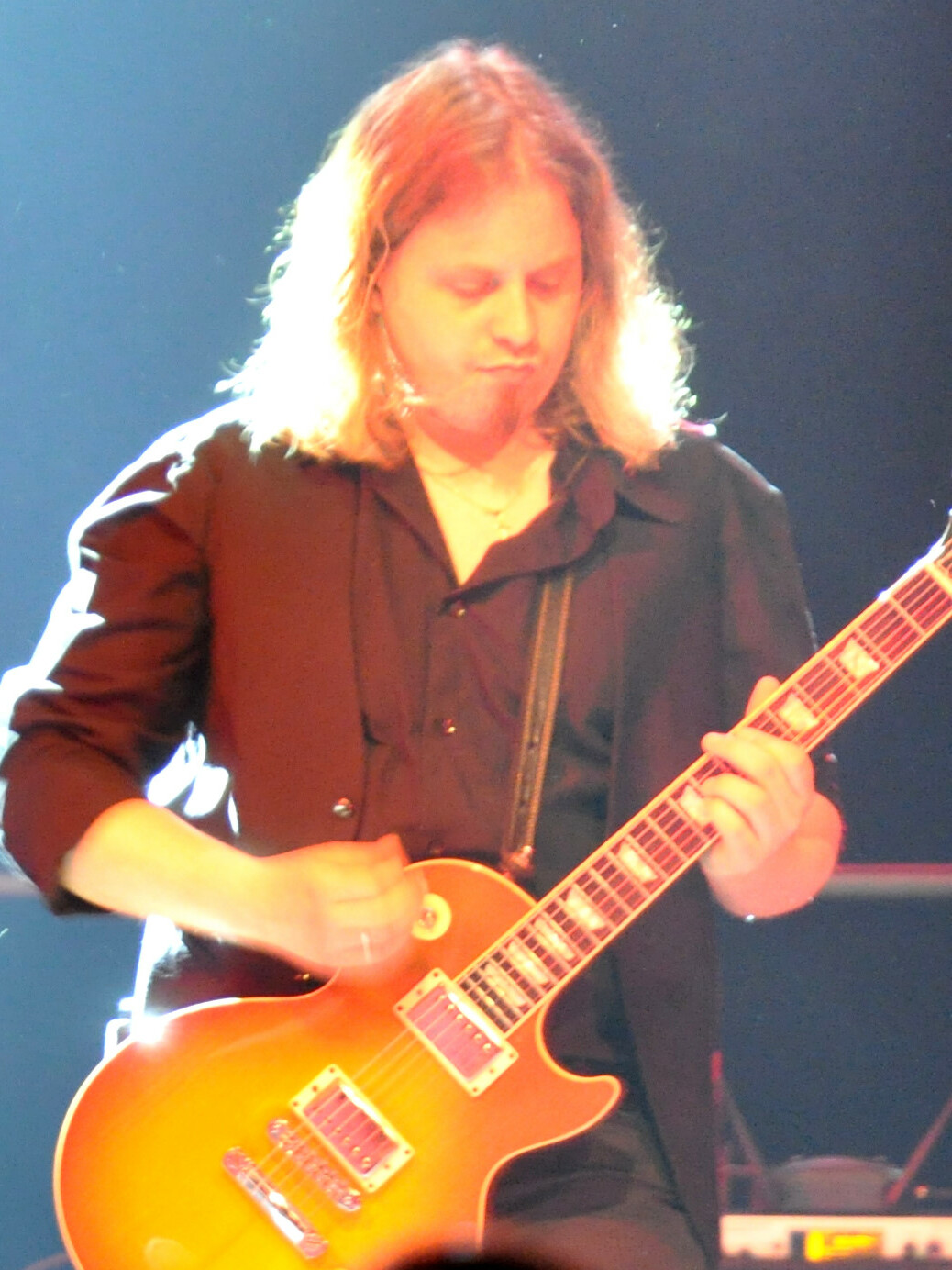
- Opahle performing with Ian Anderson in 2016

Background information
- Born: 1983 (age 41–42); Rosenheim, Germany
- Genres: Progressive rock, folk rock, hard rock
- Occupation(s): Musician, producer
- Instrument: Guitar
- Years active: 2003–present
- Labels: Chrysalis, Eagle, EMI, Capital
- Formerly of: Jethro Tull
- Website: florian-opahle.de

Florian Opahle (born 1983) is a German guitarist, best known for playing with progressive rock musician Ian Anderson from 2003 to 2019 and his reformed Jethro Tull from 2017 to 2019.

== Early career ==
Opahle grew up in Rosenheim, Bavaria. He began learning classical guitar at age five and later trained in electric guitar. In 2001 and 2002, he attended master classes with Masayuki Kato. He completed his high school diploma in 2002.

== Career ==
In 2003 he started working with Ian Anderson and Jethro Tull. He appeared in Europe, North and South America and Asia on and played with musicians such as Al di Meola, Greg Lake and Leslie Mandoki. He accompanied the singer Masha on her Germany tour. From 2007 to 2008 he studied music arrangement and composition at the German Pop Academy.

Opahle took part in several tours with Anderson instead of longtime Jethro Tull guitarist Martin Barre, including on projects in which pieces by Jethro Tull were played with orchestral accompaniment. With Anderson and other musicians, he recorded the albums Thick as a Brick 2 (2012) and Homo Erraticus (2014). From 2017, Anderson toured under the name of Jethro Tull with his regular backing musicians.

Opahle is also active as a studio musician and producer, among others for Alexandra Stan. At times he devotes himself to flamenco music.

Opahle also performed live with former King Crimson and ELP member Greg Lake, which resulted in him appearing on his 2006 album, Live.

Since 2017, he has been running a professional recording studio with his wife called RedBoxx Studios in the south of Germany.

== Discography ==
With Ian Anderson/Jethro Tull

- Ian Anderson Plays the Orchestral Jethro Tull (2005)
- Thick as a Brick 2 (2012)
- Homo Erraticus (2014)
- Thick as a Brick – Live in Iceland (2014)
- The Zealot Gene by Jethro Tull (2022)
