= Maria Kobel =

German chemist (1897–1996)

- Born: 5 August 1897; Liegnitz, German Empire (now Legnica, Poland)
- Died: August 1996 (aged 99)
- Education: University of Breslau (Ph.D)
- Scientific career
- Fields: Biochemistry
- Workplaces: Kaiser Wilhelm Institute for Biochemistry; Hoffman House; Beilstein Edition

Maria Kobel (5 August 1897 – August 1996), was a German biochemist.

== Life and work ==
Maria Kobel was born on 5 August 1897 in Liegnitz, German Empire (now Legnica, Poland). After finished her Ph.D. at the University of Breslau in 1921, she was hired by Carl Neuberg, head of the Kaiser Wilhelm Institute for Biochemistry, who became her mentor. She studied the chemical processes of tobacco fermentation there. She became the acting head of the Department for Tobacco Research in 1928 and became head in her own right the following year until it was closed in 1936 for lack of funding. Kobel then worked in the laboratory of Hoffman House studying the chemical basis of fermentation. During this time she contributed several articles to the standard handbook, (German: Die Methoden der Fermentforschung). When the building housing the Hoffman House laboratory in Berlin was destroyed by Allied bombs during World War II, Kobel was evacuated to Frankfurt-am-Main where she became an editor of the Beilstein Edition until her retirement. She died a few days after her 99th birthday in August 1996.
