= Walter Köbel =

German politician

Walter Klaus Köbel
- Walter Köbel
- Born: 20 March 1918; Darmstadt, German Empire
- Died: 10 September 1965 (aged 47); Rüsselsheim am Main, West Germany
- Education: Doctor of Law
- Spouse: Irma Wettlauffer

Walter Klaus Köbel (20 March 1918 - 10 September 1965) was a German politician.

Köbel was first elected as Mayor of Rüsselsheim in 1954 at the age of 36. In October 1963 he entered Hessian State Parliament as a member of the SPD, and held this position until his sudden death on 10 September 1965.

Following his death, a newly built sports hall in Rüsselsheim was named in his honour as the Walter-Köbel-Halle, but renamed on 14 March 2013 when, due to an historical inquiry, his former involvement in national socialist ideology became generally known.

== Sources ==
- Lengemann, Jochen (1986). Das Hessen-Parlament 1946–1986 (PDF) (Report) (in German). Frankfurt-am-Main: Insel Verlag. p. 304.

Preceded by Ludwig Dörfler	Mayor; 1954–1965	Succeeded by Karl-Heinz Storsberg
