= Homo Erraticus =

2014 studio album by Ian Anderson

Studio album by Ian Anderson
- Released: 14 April 2014
- Recorded: January 2014
- Genre: Progressive rock
- Length: 51:57
- Label: Kscope

Ian Anderson chronology
Thick as a Brick 2 (2012)	Homo Erraticus (2014)	Thick as a Brick - Live in Iceland (2014)

Homo Erraticus is the sixth studio album by British progressive rock musician Ian Anderson, who is also the frontman of Jethro Tull. Released on 14 April 2014, Homo Erraticus is a concept album, loosely connected to Jethro Tull's Thick as a Brick (1972) and Anderson's Thick as a Brick 2 (2012), since it again credits the lyrics to the fictional character Gerald Bostock.

The album was released in four formats: as a double vinyl, a single CD, a CD + DVD collection, and an Amazon.com exclusive box set edition, containing the album on CD as well as three bonus discs.

Anderson and his band embarked on a promotional tour of the album, in which they performed the entire album for the first half of each show, and the best of Jethro Tull for the second half.

== Musical style ==
Homo Erraticus is a progressive rock album which, according to Anderson, blends folk and medieval as well as heavy metal music styles. Stephen Thomas Erlewine of AllMusic called the album "as close to 1970s progressive rock as is possible in 2014".

== Concept ==
The phrase Homo Erraticus is Latin for "wandering man", and the concept for the album builds tangentially upon the fictional narrative of Ian Anderson's recurring character Gerald Bostock, a literary child prodigy. Details of the album's fictional story are provided, but also slightly contradicted, by two official sources: the Jethro Tull website and the album's own promotional website.

The general backstory underlying the album is that, in the year 2014, poet Gerald Bostock, now in his early fifties, has recently discovered in his town's bookstore a "dusty, unpublished manuscript, written by local amateur historian Ernest T. Parritt, (1873 -1928)" which is entitled either "Homo Britanicus Erraticus" or "Homo erraticus (The St Cleve Chronicles)". Anderson claims that the album's lyrics are Bostock's resulting interpretation of Parritt's "illustrated document [which] summarises key historical elements of early civilisation in Britain and seems to prophesy future scenarios too". Apparently, two years before his death, Parritt began suddenly recalling visions of past-life experiences, attributed either to the fact that "Parritt had a traumatic fall from his horse" or "Parritt suffered from a recurrence of malaria, contracted during his Army days in India". In either case:

[Parritt] awoke with the overwhelming conviction of having enjoyed past lives as historical characters: a pre-history nomadic neolithic settler, an Iron Age blacksmith, a Saxon invader, a Christian monk, a Seventeenth Century grammar school boy, turnpike innkeeper, one of Brunel’s railroad engineers, and even Prince Albert, husband of Queen Victoria. This befuddled, delusional obsession extends to his prophecy of future events and his fantasy imaginings of lives yet to come.... Bostock has returned once again to lyric writing, basing his new effort on the Parritt papers and I [Anderson] have had the fun and frolics of setting all to music of Folk-Rock-Metal stylings.

== Critical reception ==
Professional ratings
Review scores
Source	Rating
AllMusic	3.5/5 stars
Sputnik Music	3.5/5 stars

The three and a half stars of AllMusic was positive, stating 'the contours of the compositions... recall classic Tull, so Homo Erraticus winds up satisfying'.

== Track listing ==
All songs credited to Ian Anderson and Gerald Bostock. The album is divided into three sections – "Chronicles", "Prophecies" and "Revelations".

Part One: Chronicles
No.	Title	Length
1.	"Doggerland (7000 BCE)"	4:20
2.	"Heavy Metals (750 BCE – 43 CE)"	1:29
3.	"Enter the Uninvited (43 CE – 410 CE – 1960!)"	4:12
4.	"Puer Ferox Adventus (313 – 600 CE)"	7:11
5.	"Meliora Sequamur (1100s)"	3:32
6.	"The Turnpike Inn (1750)"	3:08
7.	"The Engineer (1847)"	3:12
8.	"The Pax Britannica (1815 – 1914)"	3:05

Part Two: Prophecies
No.	Title	Length
9.	"Tripudium Ad Bellum (1914 – 1939)"	2:48
10.	"After These Wars (1950s)"	4:28
11.	"New Blood, Old Veins (1960s)"	2:31

Part Three: Revelations
No.	Title	Length
12.	"In for a Pound (2013)"	0:36
13.	"The Browning of the Green (2014)"	4:05
14.	"Per Errationes Ad Astra (2024)"	1:33
15.	"Cold Dead Reckoning (2044)"	5:28

== Personnel ==
Musicians

- Ian Anderson – lead and backing vocals, flute, acoustic guitar
- Florian Opahle – electric guitar
- John O'Hara – piano, organ, keyboards, accordion
- David Goodier – bass guitar
- Scott Hammond – drums, percussion
- Ryan O'Donnell – additional vocals

Production

- Michael Downs – recording engineer
- Jakko Jakszyk – mixing, mastering
- Carl Glover – artwork, design, photography

Personnel per Discogs

== Charts ==
Chart (2014)	Peak position
Austrian Albums (Ö3 Austria)	41
Belgian Albums (Ultratop Wallonia)	171
Finnish Albums (Suomen virallinen lista)	34
German Albums (Offizielle Top 100)	13
Italian Albums (FIMI)	47
Dutch Albums (Album Top 100)	45
Scottish Albums (OCC)	12
Swiss Albums (Schweizer Hitparade)	69
UK Albums (OCC)	14
UK Independent Albums (OCC)	3
Billboard 200	111
US Independent Albums (Billboard)	21
US Top Rock Albums (Billboard)	23
