= David Goodier =

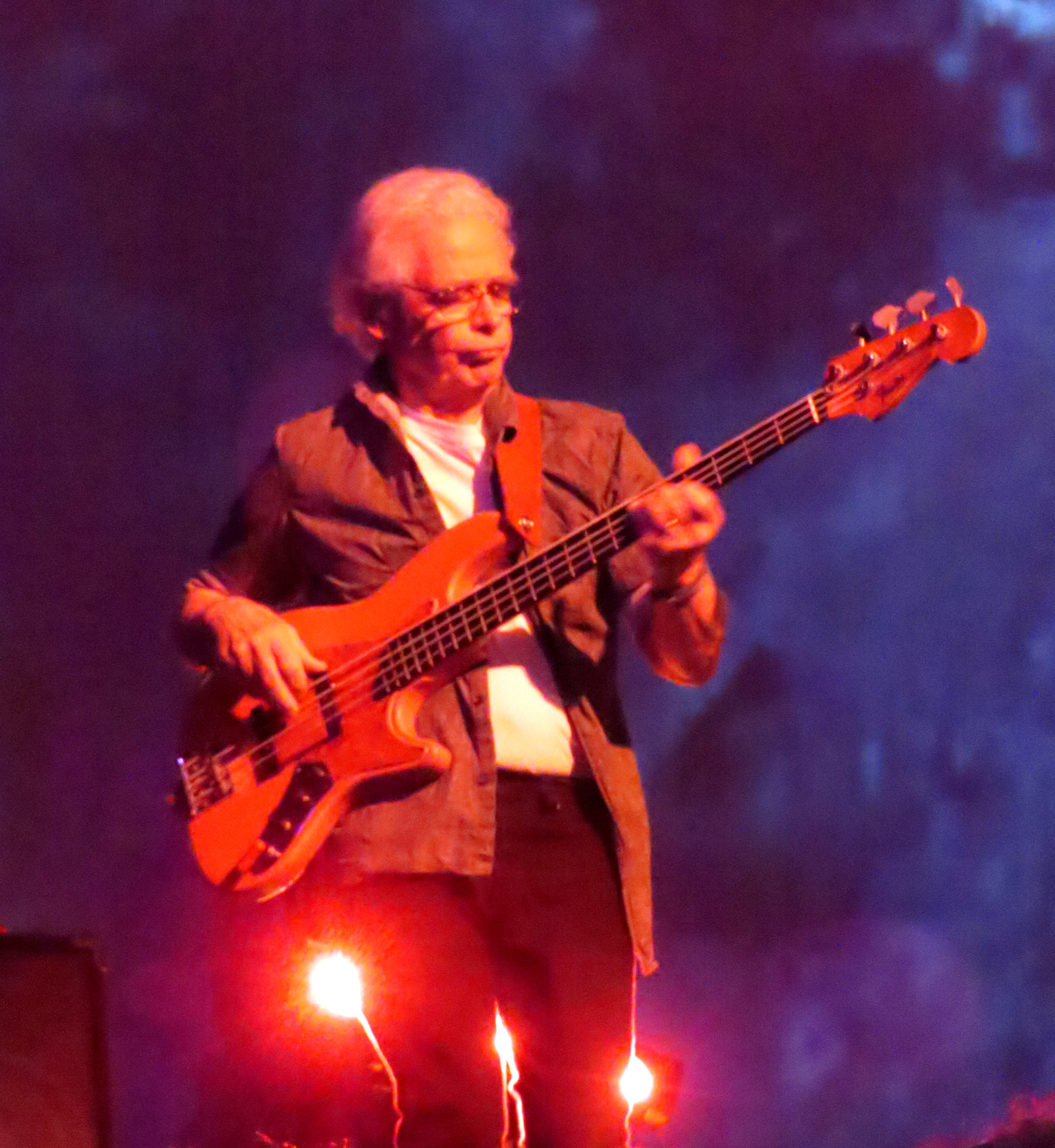
- Goodier performing with Jethro Tull in Cambridge, April 2024

Background information
- Born: 1954 (age 71–72)
- Genres: Progressive rock, folk rock, jazz rock
- Occupation: Musician
- Instrument: Bass guitar
- Years active: 1979–present

David Goodier (born 1954) is an English musician. He has been the bassist for the rock band Jethro Tull from 2007 until the band went on a hiatus in 2012, and again from 2017 when Ian Anderson started to tour again using the Jethro Tull name, with Goodier and keyboardist John O'Hara the only former Jethro Tull members to join Anderson. Jethro Tull's 2022 album The Zealot Gene, their first in 19 years, marked Goodier's first appearance on a Jethro Tull studio recording.

Goodier has appeared with many artists from the world of jazz, pop and rock and also worked extensively in theatre pit bands.

Since 2002, he has been touring worldwide with Ian Anderson.

In the summer of 2006, he accompanied British soprano Lesley Garrett, on her sold-out tour of the United Kingdom.

He recorded with UK-based Celtic/jazz group Carmina on their album My Crescent City, produced by Dónal Lunny, and also appears as a guest on American guitarist Brooks Williams' album, Oh Baby!

During the Jethro Tull hiatus Goodier played on Ian Anderson's solo albums Thick as a Brick 2 and Homo Erraticus. He was also a member of Anderson's touring band for Thick as a Brick 2.
