= Begin Again (Space song) =

1998 song by Britpop band Space

Single by Space

from the album Tin Planet
- B-side: "You Romantic Fool"; "Numb the Doubt"; "Influenza" (Flu mix)
- Released: 22 June 1998
- Length: 3:08
- Label: Gut
- Songwriters: James Desmond Edwards; Franny Griffiths; Tommy Scott
- Producers: Jeremy Wheatley; Space

Space singles chronology
"(How Does It Feel to Be) On Top of the World" (1998)	"Begin Again" (1998)	"Diary of a Wimp" (2000)

"Begin Again" is a song by English band Space, released in June 1998. The song charted at number 21 on the UK Singles Chart the same month. In Australia, "Begin Again" entered the ARIA Singles Chart on 27 July 1998 at number 82, its peak.

== Track listings ==
UK CD1

1. "Begin Again" (radio edit)
2. "You Romantic Fool"
3. "Numb the Doubt"
4. "Influenza" (Flu mix)

UK CD2

1. "Begin Again" (radio edit)
2. "The Ballad of Tom Jones" (raw and live from Wolverhampton Civic Hall with Cerys Matthews, 1998)
3. "Female of the Species" (raw and live from Wolverhampton Civic Hall, 1998)
4. "Spiders" (raw and live from Wolverhampton Civic Hall, 1998)

UK cassette single

1. "Begin Again" (radio edit)
2. "You Romantic Fool"
3. "Numb the Doubt"

Australian CD single

1. "Begin Again" (radio edit)
2. "The Ballad of Tom Jones"
3. "Avenging Angels"
4. "The Ballad of Tom Jones" (live)
5. "Avenging Angels" (live)

== Charts ==
Chart (1998)	Peak position
Australia (ARIA)	82
Scotland Singles (OCC)	18
UK Singles (OCC)	21
UK Indie (OCC)	3
