= Invasion of the Spiders =

Compilation album by Space
- Released: 12 August 1997
- Genre: Indie rock, electronic, techno, drum and bass
- Label: Gut Records GUTCD4
- Producer: Space, Yorkie

Space chronology
Spiders (1996)	Invasion of the Spiders (1997)	Tin Planet (2005)

Professional ratings
Review scores
Source	Rating
Uncut	2/5 stars

Invasion of the Spiders: Remixed... and Unreleased Tracks is a two-disc compilation album by Space, released on 12 August 1997 on Gut Records. Disc one consists of several remixes by the group (mainly from their keyboard player Franny Griffiths, credited under the aliases Frannie Asprin) and other artists, whilst the second disc compiles tracks that have previously appeared as B-sides.

The album's sleeve makes reference to the Pillars of Creation, an iconic photograph taken by the Hubble Space Telescope in 1995 demonstrating a formation of stars in the Eagle Nebula.

== Track listing ==
CD1: Remixed
No.	Title	Remixed by	Length
1.	"Kill Me (Space Club Mix)"	Frannie Aspirin, Yorkie	5:42
2.	"Money (Space Club Mix)"	Frannie Aspirin, Yorkie	4:44
3.	"Neighbourhood (Live It Club Mix)"	Live It	5:08
4.	"Neighbourhood (Pissed Up Stomp Mix)"	Hip Optimist	6:28
5.	"Neighbourhood (Aquarius Catherine Wheel Road Dub Mix)"	Aquarius	6:58
6.	"Female of the Species (D'Still'd Remix Full Mix)"	D'still'd	8:55
7.	"Me and You Vs the World (Knickers Mix)"	Frannie Aspirin	4:15
8.	"Me and You Vs the World (No Knickers Mix)"	Frannie Aspirin	4:19
9.	"Me and You Vs. the Dub"	SX Dub	5:05
10.	"Dark Clouds (Alternative Version)"	Space, Yorkie	4:47
11.	"Darker Clouds"	Space, Yorkie	3:43

CD2: Unreleased
No.	Title	Length
1.	"Dark Clouds (Radio Edit)"	3:33
2.	"Kill Me (Radio Edit)"	3:51
3.	"Turn Me On To Spiders"	4:36
4.	"Rejects"	3:12
5.	"Blow Your Cover"	3:07
6.	"Give Me Something"	4:07
7.	"Crisis"	2:39
8.	"Shut Your Mouth"	1:59
9.	"Children of the Night"	4:23
10.	"Influenza"	4:18
11.	"Had Enough"	6:18
