= Me and You Versus the World =

1996 single by Space

Single by Space

from the album Spiders
- B-side: "Spiders"; "Life of a Miser"; "Blow Your Cover"
- Released: 26 August 1996
- Genre: Rock
- Length: 3:35
- Label: Gut
- Songwriters: Tommy Scott; Franny Griffiths; Space
- Producer: Stephen Lironi

Space singles chronology
"Female of the Species" (1996)	"Me and You Versus the World" (1996)	"Neighbourhood" (1996)

Audio
- "Me and You Versus the World" on YouTube

"Me and You Versus the World" is the third single by Liverpool-based band Space. It was released on 26 August 1996 as the fourth single from their debut album, Spiders (1996). The song was the band's first top-10 hit on the UK Singles Chart, peaking at number nine in September 1996.

== Track listings ==
- CD1
1. "Me and You Versus the World" (radio edit)
2. "Me and You Versus the World" (Knickers mix)
3. "Me and You Versus the World" (No Knickers mix)
4. "Me and You Versus the World" (Crotchless Knickers mix)
- CD2
1. "Me and You Versus the World"
2. "Spiders"
3. "Life of a Miser"
4. "Blow Your Cover"
- Cassette single
1. "Me and You Versus the World"
2. "Spiders"

== Charts ==
Chart (1996)	Peak position
Europe (Eurochart Hot 100)	48
Scotland Singles (Official Charts)	9
UK Singles (Official Charts)	9
