= Dark Clouds (Space song) =

1997 single by Space

Single by Space

from the album Spiders
- Released: 10 February 1997
- Recorded: 1995–1996
- Genre: Alternative rock
- Length: 3:50
- Label: Gut Records
- Songwriter(s): Tommy Scott, Franny Griffiths, Space
- Producer(s): Stephen Lironi

Space singles chronology
"Neighbourhood" (1996)	"Dark Clouds" (1997)	"Avenging Angels" (1997)

"Dark Clouds" is a song by Space, released as their fifth and final single from their debut album Spiders (1996). The song peaked at #14 on the UK singles chart in February 1997.

== Track listing ==
- CD1 CDGUT6
1. "Dark Clouds (Radio Edit)"
2. "Dark Clouds (Alternative Version)"
3. "Storm Clouds"
4. "Darker Clouds"
- CD2 CXGUT6
1. "Dark Clouds (Radio Edit)" - 3:32
2. "Children Of The Night" – 4:22
3. "Influenza" – 4:17
4. "Had Enough" – 6:18
- Cassette CAGUT6
1. "Dark Clouds (Radio Edit)" - 3:32
2. "Children Of The Night" – 4:22
3. "Influenza" – 4:17

== Charts ==
Chart (1997)	Peak position
Australia (ARIA)	228
UK (Official Charts Company)	14
UK Indie (Music Week)	1
