= Greatest Hits (Space album) =

Greatest hits album by Space
- Released: 8 July 2002
- Recorded: 1995–2000
- Genre: Alternative rock
- Length: 51:15
- Label: Gut Records
- Producer: Various

Space chronology
Tin Planet (1998)	Greatest Hits (2002)	Music for Aliens (2002–03)

Greatest Hits is a greatest hits compilation by Space, released on 8 July 2002 to coincide with Space's split with long-serving record label Gut Records.

== Track listing ==
1. "Female of the Species" (Scott/Space; taken from Spiders) – 3:20
2. "Avenging Angels" (Scott/Space; taken from Tin Planet) – 2:59
3. "Neighbourhood" (Scott/Griffiths/Space; taken from Spiders) – 3:29
4. "The Ballad of Tom Jones" (with Cerys Matthews) (Scott/Space; taken from Tin Planet) – 4:10
5. "Sunny Afternoon" (with Tom Jones) (Davies; taken from the Tom Jones album Reload) – 3:27
6. "Money" (Scott/Griffiths/Space; taken from Spiders) – 4:02
7. "Begin Again" (Scott/Space; taken from Tin Planet) – 3:08
8. "We've Gotta Get Outta This Place" (Mann/Weil; taken from The Bad Days EP) – 3:20
9. "Bad Days" (Remix) (Scott/Space; taken from The Bad Days EP, original version taken from Tin Planet) – 3:23
10. "Dark Clouds" (Scott/Griffiths/Space; taken from Spiders) – 3:48
11. "Me And You Versus the World" (Scott/Griffiths/Space; taken from Spiders) – 3:37
12. "Diary of a Wimp" (Scott/Space; taken from Diary of a Wimp single, originally meant to be taken from Love You More than Football) – 2:47
13. "Gravity" (Murphy/Space; unreleased, originally meant to be taken from Love You More than Football) – 4:42
14. "The Shit You Talk is Beautiful" (Scott/Space, unreleased) – 2:20
15. "Spiders" (Scott/Space, taken from Me and You Versus the World single) – 2:51

== Greatest Hits: Collectors Edition ==
Greatest Hits: Collectors Edition

Greatest hits album by Space
- Released: 16 May 2005
- Recorded: 1995–2000
- Genre: Alternative rock
- Length: 51:15 (Disc One); 74:04 (Disc Two); 121:19 (Entire album)
- Label: Gut Records
- Producer: Various

Space chronology
Suburban Rock 'N' Roll (2004)	Greatest Hits: Collectors Edition (2005)

On 16 May 2005, Greatest Hits was re-released as a two-disc "collectors edition", with the bonus disc compiling b-sides and remixes from their previous singles.

=== Track listing ===
==== Disc One ====
1. "Female of the Species" (Scott/Space; taken from Spiders) – 3:20
2. "Avenging Angels" (Scott/Space; taken from Tin Planet) – 2:59
3. "Neighbourhood" (Scott/Griffiths/Space; taken from Spiders) – 3:29
4. "The Ballad of Tom Jones" (with Cerys Matthews) (Scott/Space; taken from Tin Planet) – 4:10
5. "Sunny Afternoon" (with Tom Jones) (Davies; taken from the Tom Jones album Reload) – 3:27
6. "Money" (Scott/Griffiths/Space; taken from Spiders) – 4:02
7. "Begin Again" (Scott/Space; taken from Tin Planet) – 3:08
8. "We've Gotta Get Outta This Place" (Mann/Weil; taken from The Bad Days EP) – 3:20
9. "Bad Days" (Remix) (Scott/Space; taken from The Bad Days EP, original version taken from Tin Planet) – 3:23
10. "Dark Clouds" (Scott/Griffiths/Space; taken from Spiders) – 3:48
11. "Me And You Versus the World" (Scott/Griffiths/Space; taken from Spiders) – 3:37
12. "Diary of a Wimp" (Scott/Space; taken from Diary of a Wimp single, originally meant to be taken from Love You More than Football) – 2:47
13. "Gravity" (Murphy/Space; unreleased, originally meant to be taken from Love You More than Football) – 4:42
14. "The Shit You Talk is Beautiful" (Scott/Space, unreleased) – 2:20
15. "Spiders" (Scott/Space, taken from Me and You Versus the World single) – 2:51

==== Disc Two ====
1. "Theme From 'Baretta Vendetta'" – 6:07
2. "Influenza" (Flu Mix) – 4:17
3. "Raymond" – 2:11
4. "Kill Me" (Radio Edit) – 3:50
5. "Give Me Something" – 4:06
6. "Children of the Night" – 4:22
7. "Had Enough" – 6:20
8. "You & Me Vs (The Dub)" – 5:05
9. "Darker Clouds" – 4:45
10. "Mister Psycho" – 3:40
11. "Now She’s Gone" – 2:38
12. "Stress Transmissions" – 3:55
13. "Neighbourhood" (Piss Dup Stomp Mix) – 6:25
14. "I Am Unlike Any Lifeform You’ve Ever Met" – 3:27
15. "Female of the Species" (D’still’d Remix) – 8:56
