= Attack of the Mutant 50ft Kebab =

Studio album by Space
- Released: 28 February 2014 (PledgeMusic); 17 March 2014
- Recorded: 2012–2013
- Studio: Antipop & Parr Street Studios, Liverpool
- Genre: Indie rock; psychobilly; ska; neo-psychedelia
- Length: 38:40
- Label: HUG Records
- Producer: Phil Hartley

Space chronology
Suburban Rock 'n' Roll (2004)	Attack of the Mutant 50ft Kebab (2014)	Give Me Your Future (2017)

Professional ratings
Review scores
Source	Rating
AllMusic	1.5/5 stars
Record Collector	2/5 stars

Attack of the Mutant 50 ft Kebab is the fourth official studio album by Space, released as a download on February 28, 2014, for PledgeMusic donators and physically released on March 17, 2014. It is the group's first studio album since their reformation in 2011 and their first studio release overall since 2004's Suburban Rock 'n' Roll.

== Background and history ==
In late 2005, then bass player Yorkie announced through the online Space forums that, due to financial difficulties and internal tensions between group members, contributed by the poor sales and reception of Suburban Rock 'n' Roll, that Space had broken up and members had all gone their separate paths: Frontman Tommy Scott formed a garage punk band called The Drella's with Space live technician Phil Hartley on bass and drummer Leon Caffrey, which eventually evolved into a ska/rockabilly act Tommy Scott & The Red Scare composed of Scott, Hartley, new drummer Allan Jones and organist Ryan Clarke. Several of the songs that made it onto Attack of the Mutant 50ft Kebab, including the title track, "Anthony's Brainwaves" and "Happy Clowns" (then known as "Gone in an Instant" or "Cash Converters" by fans), were written by Scott and performed live during this period. Meanwhile, keyboardist Franny Griffiths started making music under the moniker Subway Showdown and later played in the band Dust with original Space guitarist Jamie Murphy, whilst Yorkie returned to producing for other bands and formed a new group Moongoose.

In August 2009, news broke out that original Space drummer Andy Parle had died of a heart attack at the age of 42. The surviving members of Space, who had all lost contact with each other since the split, showed up at his memorial service, which triggered off a discussion on the possibility of reviving the group. In late 2011, it was announced that Space was to reform as a six-piece consisting of Scott, Griffiths and Murphy plus Scott's bandmates in The Red Scare, for a one-off homecoming gig at the O2 Academy Liverpool, playing old favourites plus brand new material to be featured off a new album entitled Attack of the Mutant 50ft Kebab. The show opened on the December 21, 2011 to a rapturous reception from the critics, who commented on how rejuvenated and fresh the band's sound had become, as well as the 50s' B-movie/hammer horror vibe of the new songs.

In early 2012, the band started work recording the songs for Attack of the Mutant 50ft Kebab at the band's long-time rehearsal studio in Highfield Street. However, the sessions were complicated by Jamie Murphy's sudden departure from the band, which meant several tracks had to be scrapped and re-recorded to accommodate the change in line-up. Undeterred as a quintet, the group continued to play gigs at venues and festivals all over the world and finish the album over the next two years, before announcing in August 2013 that they would fund the release of the album through PledgeMusic, letting fans get the album first by donating money so they can purchase the record along with perks such as signed CDs, a vinyl release of the album, handwritten lyrics and T-shirts.

In the meantime, music videos for the tracks "Frightened Horses" and "Fortune Teller" were issued in early 2013 to whet people's appetites. The band had initially planned to leave both songs off the album and release them as download-only singles, akin to their Music for Aliens releases, but remained on the final track listing due to its popularity within the group and fans. "Fortune Teller" was eventually released as a 7" vinyl on March 3, 2014, accompanied by the B-side "The Perfect Sin".

== Track listing ==
All songs written by Tommy Scott.

No.	Title	Length
1.	"Teardrops from the Moon"	2:57
2.	"Fortune Teller"	3:38
3.	"Armageddon"	4:22
4.	"She's in Love with the Boy in a Bodybag"	3:15
5.	"Attack of the Mutant 50ft Kebab"	2:31
6.	"Frightened Horses"	3:10
7.	"Anthony's Brainwaves"	3:34
8.	"Crying on the Webcam"	3:13
9.	"Guest List to Hell"	4:09
10.	"Happy Clowns"	3:05
11.	"Falling in Love"	2:07
12.	"Day of the Dead"	2:39

== Personnel ==
Space:

- Tommy Scott – lead vocals, guitars
- Franny Griffiths – keyboards, synthesizers, sonic manipulations, backing vocals
- Phil Hartley – upright & electric basses, backing vocals
- Ryan Clarke – organ, analogue synth, backing vocals, lead vocals (track 10)
- Allan Jones – drums, backing vocals

Production:

- Phil Hartley – producer, recording engineer (tracks 1 & 3), additional recording (track 12)
- Anthony Brady – recording engineer (tracks 1, 2 & 3), additional recording (track 12)
- Jeremy Wheatley – mixing (tracks 1, 3, 8 & 9)
- Jon Withnall – recording engineer (tracks 2, 4–12), mixing (tracks 2–7, 10–12)
- Tommy Scott – front cover painting
- Anthony Brown & The Brown Cow Co. – design
- Mark E. Cowley @ Hug Management – management
