= (How Does It Feel to Be) On Top of the World =

Single by England United
- Released: 1 June 1998
- Recorded: February 1998
- Genre: Pop rock
- Length: 4:50
- Label: Universal Music; London
- Songwriters: Ian McCulloch; Johnny Marr
- Producer: Ian McCulloch

Echo & the Bunnymen singles chronology
"Don't Let It Get You Down" (1997)	"(How Does It Feel to Be) On Top of the World" (1998)	"Rust" (1999)

Ocean Colour Scene singles chronology
"It's a Beautiful Thing" (1998)	"(How Does It Feel to Be) On Top of the World" (1998)	"Profit in Peace" (1999)

Space singles chronology
"The Ballad of Tom Jones" (1998)	"(How Does It Feel to Be) On Top of the World" (1998)	"Begin Again" (1998)

Spice Girls singles chronology
"Stop" (1998)	"(How Does It Feel to Be) On Top of the World" (1998)	"Viva Forever" (1998)

"(How Does It Feel to Be) On Top of the World" is a song by the British supergroup England United – formed by members of Echo & the Bunnymen, Ocean Colour Scene, Space and the Spice Girls. The song was written by Echo and the Bunnymen frontman Ian McCulloch and Johnny Marr and released as the official theme of the England national football team for the 1998 World Cup. According to Official Charts Company the single has sold a total of 94,000 copies.

== Background and release ==
In 1998, Universal Music Group and the UEFA European Championship called a group of artists to record the official theme of the England national football team for the 1998 World Cup. The supergroup, credited as England United, was formed by Ian McCulloch of Echo and the Bunnymen, who co-wrote the song with Johnny Marr, the Spice Girls, Tommy Scott of Space, and Simon Fowler of Ocean Colour Scene. The song was the final single by the Spice Girls released with Geri Halliwell's vocals, until the group's reunion in 2007. It was overshadowed however by "Three Lions 98" and "Vindaloo". It was released on 2 CD single formats on the same day, the first featuring the standard versions of the song, including an instrumental. The second featuring remixes by Perfecto and an alternative instrumental version. The sleeve designs were of the white home kit (CD1) and the away red kit (CD2).

== Reception ==
Although the song was a substantial chart hit in the UK, peaking at #9, critical reception to the song was largely negative. Chris Evans was quoted as saying: "It is a good pop song, but you can't sing it on the terraces. You can't really get your teeth into the lyrics." Charlie Porter in The Times said that it was "a snivelling apology for an official song" that "washes over you". Matthew Wright, writing in The Daily Mirror quoted footballers Ian Wright and Rio Ferdinand describing it as "bollocks" and "rubbish" respectively. In 2006 Guardian readers voted it the second worst England football song ever, after 1982's "This Time (We'll Get It Right)". BBC reporter Mark Savage describes the song as "clumsy and boring". When it was played at Wembley Stadium, it was booed by fans.

== Live performances ==
The song was first performed live on TFI Friday on 1 May 1998. On 21 May 1998, a performance of the song was recorded for Top of the Pops, which was broadcast on 5 June 1998.

== Music video ==
An official music video was released featuring all the members of England United, with appearances by footballers of the National Team, including David Beckham, Ian Wright and Rio Ferdinand.

== Track listing ==
CD one / Cassette

No.	Title	Length
1.	"(How Does It Feel to Be) On Top of the World"	4:50
2.	"(How Does It Feel to Be) On Top of the World (Instrumental)"	4:47

CD two

No.	Title	Length
1.	"(How Does It Feel To Be) On Top of the World (Perfecto Edit)"
2.	"(How Does It Feel To Be) On Top of the World (Perfecto Remix)"	6:00
3.	"(How Does It Feel To Be) On Top of the World (Match of the Day Instrumental)"

CD (International)

No.	Title	Length
1.	"(How Does It Feel to Be) On Top of the World (Radio Edit)"	4:31
2.	"(How Does It Feel to Be) On Top of the World"	4:50
3.	"(How Does It Feel to Be) On Top of the World (Instrumental)"	4:47

== Charts ==
Chart (1998)	Peak position
Canada (Nielsen SoundScan)	16
Scotland (Official Charts Company)	38
UK Singles (Official Charts)	9
