= Brian Clark =

Brian Clark may refer to:

- Brian Clark (writer) (1932–2021), English playwright and screenwriter
- Brian Clark (footballer, born 1943) (1943–2010), English footballer
- Brian Clark (Scottish footballer) (born 1988), Scottish footballer
- Brian C. Clark, American physiologist
- Brian D. Clark (born 1956), Pennsylvania politician
- Brian Clark (American football) (born 1983), American football wide receiver
- Brian Clark (Canadian football) (born 1974), former Canadian Football League linebacker
- Brian Clark (September 11 survivor) (born 1947), Canadian survivor of the attacks on the World Trade Center on September 11, 2001
- Brian Clark (cricketer) (born 1964), Zimbabwean cricketer
- Brian Clark (placekicker) (born 1958), American football placekicker
- Brian Clark (rugby league), New Zealand rugby league player
- Brian Clark (speedway rider) (born 1943), English motorcycle speedway rider

== See also ==
- Bryan Clark (born 1964), American wrestler
- Bryan Clark (disambiguation)
- Bryan Clarke (1932–2014), British academic
- Brian Clarke (disambiguation)
