= Female of the Species =

1996 single by Space

Single by Space

from the album Spiders
- B-side: "Looney Tune"; "Give Me Something"
- Released: 27 May 1996
- Genre: Alternative rock
- Length: 3:19
- Label: Gut
- Songwriters: James Fagan; Franny Griffiths; Andy Parle; Tommy Scott
- Producer: Stephen Lironi

Space singles chronology
"Neighbourhood" (1996)	"Female of the Species" (1996)	"Me and You Versus the World" (1996)

Music video
- "Female of the Species" on YouTube

"Female of the Species" is a song by English rock band Space, released as their fourth single and second single proper from their debut album, Spiders (1996), on 27 May 1996. The song reached number 14 on the UK Singles Chart and earned a silver certification from the British Phonographic Industry (BPI) in October 2019. It became the band's only charting single in both the United States and Canada.

== About the song ==
Written and sung by frontman Tommy Scott in tribute to his late father, who reportedly disliked his son's taste of music, "Female of the Species" is a funky, upbeat, Latin-flavoured number with feel-good-sounding vibes and vocals, reminiscent of lounge singers such as Perry Como and Frank Sinatra, combined with keyboardist Franny Griffiths' trademark sound effects and Scott's darkly humorous lyrics. The song borrows to some extent, both thematically and in overall aesthetic, from the Walker Brothers' theme song for the 1967 film Deadlier Than the Male. When the song was performed at later concerts, Scott usually walked into the audience to shake them by the hand.

The song's distinctive style and lyrics led to it being used in TV and film. It was the theme song to the UK drama Cold Feet and appeared in the 1997 film The Matchmaker starring Janeane Garofalo, as well as during the end credits of the popular movie Austin Powers: International Man of Mystery (in the so-called 'Fembot Mix', available on the Original Soundtrack), and in the Daria episode "College Bored". It gained further popularity in the UK when used in a 1998 advert (with a cameo appearance by Quentin Crisp) for the body spray "Impulse".

The song's name is a reference to the 1911 Rudyard Kipling poem "The Female of the Species", which has as its refrain: "The female of the species is more deadly than the male."

== Chart performance ==
"Female of the Species" debuted at number 15 on the UK Singles Chart on 2 June 1996 and reached its peak of number 14 the following week. On 11 October 2019, the British Phonographic Industry (BPI) awarded the song a silver certification for sales and streams of over 200,000 units. It became the band's only entry on any music chart in the United States and Canada, peaking at number 15 on the US Billboard Modern Rock Tracks chart, number four on the Canadian RPM Alternative 30 chart, and number 68 on the RPM 100 Hit Tracks chart. In Australia, "Female of the Species" entered the ARIA Singles Chart on 11 May 1997, peaking at number 80 in June.

== Track listings ==
UK and Australian CD single
No.	Title	Length
1.	"Female of the Species" (radio edit)
2.	"Looney Tune"
3.	"Give Me Something"
4.	"Female of the Species" (instrumental)

UK 12-inch single
No.	Title	Length
1.	"Female of the Species" (D'Still'D remix)
2.	"Female of the Species" (radio edit)
3.	"Female of the Species" (Full On mix)
4.	"Give Me Something"

UK cassette single
No.	Title	Length
1.	"Female of the Species"
2.	"Looney Tune"

== Charts ==
=== Weekly charts ===
Chart (1996–1997)	Peak position
Australia (ARIA)	80
Canada Top Singles (RPM)	68
Canada Rock/Alternative (RPM)	4
Europe (Eurochart Hot 100)	40
Scottish Singles Sales (Official Charts)	17
UK Singles (Official Charts)	14
UK Indie (Music Week)	1
US Hot 100 Airplay (Billboard)	71
US Modern Rock Tracks (Billboard)	15

=== Year-end charts ===
Chart (1996)	Position
UK Singles (OCC)	91

Chart (1997)	Position
Canada Rock/Alternative (RPM)	46
US Modern Rock Tracks (Billboard)	73

== Certifications ==
Region	Certification	Certified units/sales
United Kingdom (BPI)	Silver	200,000^{‡}
^{‡} Sales+streaming figures based on certification alone.

== Release history ==
Region	Date	Format(s)	Label(s)	Ref.
United Kingdom	27 May 1996	12-inch vinyl; CD; cassette	Gut	
United States	13 January 1997	Alternative radio	Universal	
