= Music for Aliens =

Compilation album of downloadable music by Space
- Released: July 2002–October 2003
- Recorded: 2002–2003 @ HUG and Satellite
- Genre: Alternative rock, electronic
- Length: 19:13 (all songs)
- Producer: Space, Rob Ferrier

Space chronology
Greatest Hits (2002)	Music for Aliens (2002)	Greatest Hits & Unheard Bits (2003)

Music for Aliens is a collection of six songs by Space, downloadable on their old website, www.spacetheband.com. It was made between 2002 and 2003, when the band was on hiatus from public recognition.

While they were busy finding a new label and working on their next album, Space released these tracks in order to keep their waiting fans happy. They were recorded at HUG and bassist Yorkie's own Satellite studios, and were produced and recorded by the band themselves, abide help from long-time contributor Rob Ferrier.

The songs marked a change in direction from their early material, ditching the old mainstream sound and incorporating a more freelance, experimental mood. Each song is different in style; for example, "Nothing to Find Her" is inspired by ambient and techno, while "Straight Line" and "The English Language Let Me Down" are more stripped down in approach. This new sound is evident on their comeback record Suburban Rock 'n' Roll, only that the songs' production is much slicker and stream-lined than those on Music for Aliens.

== The "Music for Aliens" series ==
=== In Black and White ===
This is the series' only two-track release. It was originally available at their Unity Theatre gig in January 2002, but was finally available for download 4 November the same year.

- "Straight Line" (3:55) – An atmospheric, slightly psychedelic song. Written by the band.
- "Nothing to Find Her" (3:14) – A dance track. Written by the band.

=== Year of the Underdog ===
The first actual Music for Aliens release, although "In Black and White" is liken to be the first. Available for download 8 July 2002.

- "Year of the Underdog" (2:25) – An ambient midtempo track which uses many vocal samples. Written by the band.

=== Spooky Bitch ===
Available for download 2 December 2002.

- "Spooky Bitch" (2:47) – An uptempo, catchy tune reminiscent of their more commercial material. Written by Tommy Scott.

=== The English Language Let Me Down ===
Available for download 26 February 2003.

- "The English Language Let Me Down" (4:06) – An alternative version of the Suburban Rock 'N' Roll track. It is less upbeat and the lyrics and arrangement are slightly different. Written by Scott.

=== ...Now I'm History! ===
The last in the Music for Aliens series. Available for download 9 October 2003, almost nine months after the previous release.

- "...Now I'm History!" (2:46) – An eerie but chirpy experimental-sounding track with distorted voices and jungle/drum 'n' bass influences. Written by Scott.
