= Kill Me =

Kill Me may refer to:

== Music ==
- "Kill Me" (The Pretty Reckless song), 2012
- "Money"/"Kill Me", a 1995 double A-side single by Space
- Kill Me (EP), a 2020 extended play by Sundara Karma

== Film ==
- Kill Me (2009 film), a South Korean film
- Kill Me (2026 film), an American film

== See also ==
- Kill Me Baby, a Japanese four-panel manga
- Kill Me Later, a 2001 American crime thriller film
- Kill Me Tomorrow, a 1957 British crime film
- London Kills Me, a 1991 British comedy film
