= Love You More than Football =

Love You More Than Football

Studio album by Space
- Released: May 2000 (promotional CD-R copies); 8 November 2019 (The Anthology boxset)
- Recorded: 1998–2000
- Genre: Indie pop
- Label: Gut Records
- Producer: Edwyn Collins, Jeremy Wheatley & Space

Space chronology
Give Me Your Future (2017)	Love You More Than Football (2000)	Music for Pleasure Music for Pain (2021)

Love You More Than Football was a previously unreleased Space album from 2000. Originally scheduled for release in July 2000, the album was intended to be their third studio album, following 1998’s Tin Planet. The album, briefly known as Bulletproof, was later rescheduled for 4 December 2001 but was never released. Most of the 14 tracks on the album were short love songs. The album was produced by Edwyn Collins.

Only one single "Diary of a Wimp", was released from the intended album, reaching #49 in the UK.

For many years, the album was set as license free, due to an early promo, CD-R, so it could be freely downloaded from the internet if a copy can be found. This was confirmed by the singer Tommy Scott, who when asked in Bristol in October 2009, apparently told a fan: "Oh God, that was meant to be released about ten years ago... If you got a copy of it, then it's yours, I've chucked that project away since Gut [records] screwed us over.".

As well as "Diary of a Wimp", three other tracks from the album later surfaced on compilations by Gut. "Gravity" appeared on Greatest Hits, and as a digital single in 2002, whilst "Good Times" and "I Love You More Than Football" appeared on Greatest Hits & Unheard Bits.

On November 8, 2019, a remixed Love You More than Football was finally officially released as part of The Anthology, a CD boxset containing the band's first five studio albums plus a disc of bonus and previously unreleased tracks. The album was also released separately on streaming services.

== Track listing ==
=== 2000 bootleg ===
No.	Title	Length
1.	"Everybody in the Madhouse"
2.	"Diary of a Wimp"
3.	"Good Times"
4.	"I Love You More than Football"
5.	"Evil Things"
6.	"Steal My Love"
7.	"Gravity"
8.	"More than a Friend"
9.	"Voices"
10.	"Supersonic Jetplane"
11.	"Despise"
12.	"Thank You"
13.	"Juno 54"
14.	"Yes You Do"

=== 2019 remix ===
No.	Title	Length
1.	"Everybody in the Madhouse"
2.	"Diary of a Wimp"
3.	"Good Times"
4.	"I Love You More than Football"
5.	"Evil Things"
6.	"No One's Gonna Steal My Love"
7.	"Gravity"
8.	"Raymond"
9.	"Voices"
10.	"Supersonic Jetplane"
11.	"Despise"
12.	"Thank You"
13.	"Juno 54"
14.	"Yes You Do"
15.	"If I Ever"
