= Ryan Clarke =

Ryan Clarke may refer to:

- Ryan Clarke (English footballer) (born 1982)
- Ryan Clarke (Australian footballer) (born 1997), Australian rules footballer
- Ryan Clarke (runner) (born 1997), Dutch middle-distance runner
- Ryan Clarke, musician in English band Space

== See also ==
- Ryan Clark (disambiguation)
- Brian Clarke (disambiguation)
