= Bryan Clark (disambiguation) =

Bryan Clark (born 1964) is an American professional wrestler.

Bryan Clark may also refer to:

- Bryan Clark (actor) (1929–2022), American film, television, and stage actor
- Bryan Clark (baseball) (born 1956), American pitcher in Major League Baseball
- Bryan Clark (American football) (born 1960), American football player
- Bryan Terrell Clark (born 1980), American actor, singer-songwriter and stage director

== See also ==
- Brian Clark (disambiguation)
- Bryan Clarke (1932–2014), British professor of genetics
- Brian Clarke (disambiguation)
