= The Ballad of Tom Jones =

1998 single by Space and Cerys Matthews

Single by Space with Cerys Matthews

from the album Tin Planet
- B-side: "Happy Endings"; "Now She's Gone"; "Stress Transmissions"
- Released: 23 February 1998
- Genre: Britpop
- Length: 4:11
- Label: Gut
- Songwriter: Tommy Scott
- Producers: Jeremy Wheatley; Space

Space singles chronology
"Avenging Angels" (1997)	"The Ballad of Tom Jones" (1998)	"(How Does It Feel to Be) On Top of the World" (1998)

Cerys Matthews singles chronology
"The Ballad of Tom Jones" (1998)	"Baby, It's Cold Outside" (1999)

"The Ballad of Tom Jones" is a song by British band Space and Cerys Matthews, lead singer of British band Catatonia. Lead singer Tommy Scott described Tom Jones as "brilliant". The song became a highly successful radio single, and resulted in Space performing with Jones in Jools Holland's' New Year's Eve television programme.

Released on 23 February 1998, "The Ballad of Tom Jones" peaked at number four on the UK Singles Chart. Outside the United Kingdom, "The Ballad of Tom Jones" peaked within the top 30 of the charts in Ireland and New Zealand and the top 50 of the charts in Australia. It is the band's highest-selling single in their home country, earning a silver certification from the British Phonographic Industry (BPI) for sales of at least 200,000 copies.

== Track listings ==
UK CD1

1. "The Ballad of Tom Jones" – 4:09
2. "Happy Endings" – 3:08
3. "Now She's Gone" – 2:36
4. "Stress Transmissions" – 3:53

UK CD2 and Australian CD single

1. "The Ballad of Tom Jones" – 4:09
2. "The Ballad of Tom Jones" (Cocktail Lounge mix) – 5:45
3. "The Ballad of Tom Jones" (Dirty Beatniks mix) – 4:29
4. "The Ballad of Tom Jones" (Sound 5 mix) – 6:48
5. "The Ballad of Tom Jones" (Sure Is Pure dub mix) – 7:14
6. "The Ballad of Tom Jones" (SX Dub "Scratchin' Cuckoo" mix) – 5:04
7. "The Ballad of Tom Jones" (Tom Jones: Axe to Your Head mix) – 6:04

UK 7-inch single

A. "The Ballad of Tom Jones" – 4:09
B. "Now She's Gone" – 2:36

UK cassette single

1. "The Ballad of Tom Jones" – 4:09
2. "Happy Endings" – 3:08
3. "Now She's Gone" – 2:36

== Charts ==
=== Weekly charts ===
Chart (1998)	Peak position
Australia (ARIA)	46
Ireland (IRMA)	26
New Zealand (Recorded Music NZ)	27
Scotland Singles (OCC)	4
UK Singles (OCC)	4
UK Indie (OCC)	2

=== Year-end charts ===
Chart (1998)	Position
UK Singles (OCC)	90

== Certifications ==
Region	Certification	Certified units/sales
United Kingdom (BPI)	Silver	200,000^{^}
^{^} Shipments figures based on certification alone.
