= Tin Planet =

Studio album by Space
- Released: 9 March 1998
- Recorded: 1997
- Studio: Parr Street Studios, Liverpool
- Genre: Alternative pop
- Length: 49:36
- Label: Gut
- Producer: Jeremy Wheatley; Space

Space chronology
Spiders (1996)	Tin Planet (1998)	Suburban Rock 'n' Roll (2004)

Singles from Tin Planet
- 1. "Avenging Angels" Released: 29 December 1997; 2. "The Ballad of Tom Jones" Released: 23 February 1998; 3. "Begin Again" Released: 22 June 1998; 4. "The Bad Days EP" Released: 23 November 1998

Tin Planet is the second studio album by English band Space, released on 9 March 1998.

Recorded in late 1997 following a tumultuous year for the group, Tin Planet was a continuation of the eclectic blend of musical styles explored on their debut album Spiders. However, it was noted that the more abrasive aspects of their sound were toned down considerably from their debut, with the songs being more melodic with a prominent cabaret and easy listening influence. Keyboardist Franny Griffiths' love of techno and electronic music was also brought to the fore, culminating in three tracks that were primarily dance-orientated.

The album was the first Space record to feature long-time collaborator David "Yorkie" Palmer as full-time bassist, and the last to feature founding member Andy Parle on drums (though he was not credited in the album's liner notes), with Leon Caffrey (formerly of the band Proper) taking his place shortly afterwards.

Tin Planet peaked at #3 in the UK charts, two places higher than Spiders. It was their first album to enter the Australian ARIA top 100 albums chart, debuting on 24 May 1998 and peaking at #74 the following week. The album peaked at #11 in New Zealand in May 1998. The songs "Avenging Angels", "The Ballad of Tom Jones" (a duet with Cerys Matthews of the band Catatonia), "Begin Again" and "Bad Days" were released as singles, all hitting the UK top 40.

== Background ==
In 1996, Space released their debut album Spiders on Gut Records. Combining surreal, darkly humorous lyrics and a large number of styles and genres, including rock, techno, hip hop and funk, a result of the different musical tastes of the band members, the album was a critical and commercial success, reaching number 5 on the UK Albums Chart and becoming certified Platinum by the British Phonographic Industry in December 1996 for sales of over 300,000. Nonetheless, in mid-1997, during their tour of the United States, where the band began to find minor success, numerous personal problems hit the band. The band were constantly under stress, which reached such an extent that keyboardist Franny Griffiths developed an ulcer, lyricist and vocalist Tommy Scott lost his voice and the band's guitarist and other lyricist and vocalist, Jamie Murphy, "still only 21, simply lost it completely and had a spell in psychiatric care being fed anti-depressants and milk."

Murphy ultimately missed many of the band's live shows and television appearances. Though widely rumoured to have depressingly watched Space perform "Dark Clouds" on BBC's Top of the Pops on television, one of the performances he missed, he was in fact preoccupied with other things and "actually forgotten the single was even out." Scott was terrified that his singing voice was permanently lost, as the cause with originally unknown; he underwent cancer treatment to make sure, but it turns out his voice was lost due to stress, and he soon recovered. Murphy also soon recovered and rejoined the band in time for the recording of Tin Planet. Scott explained, "Me losing my voice turned out to be the best thing because everyone had two months off so everyone got their heads together. Jamie got better and then everything happened naturally. I went to see Jamie and he was all right - a lot better - so we forgave him." However, throughout the writing and recording of the album, the band felt they were of an uncertain future and were in a darker environment than before.

In late 1997, just prior to the recording of Tin Planet, the band's old friend, Dave "Yorkie" Palmer, joined the group. He has already contributed backing to vocals on "Neighbourhood", one of the band's biggest hits from Spiders, and was involved in the production of several of the album's B-sides, but he was asked to join the band proper as their full-time bassist, which allowed Scott to focus on his vocals. However, shortly after Palmer had joined the band, the death of his mother Gladys Palmer, a Liverpudlian singer who owned the rehearsal rooms Space practised in, came as a devastation to the group. Her death brought a "tinge of sadness" to the recording sessions.

== Recording ==
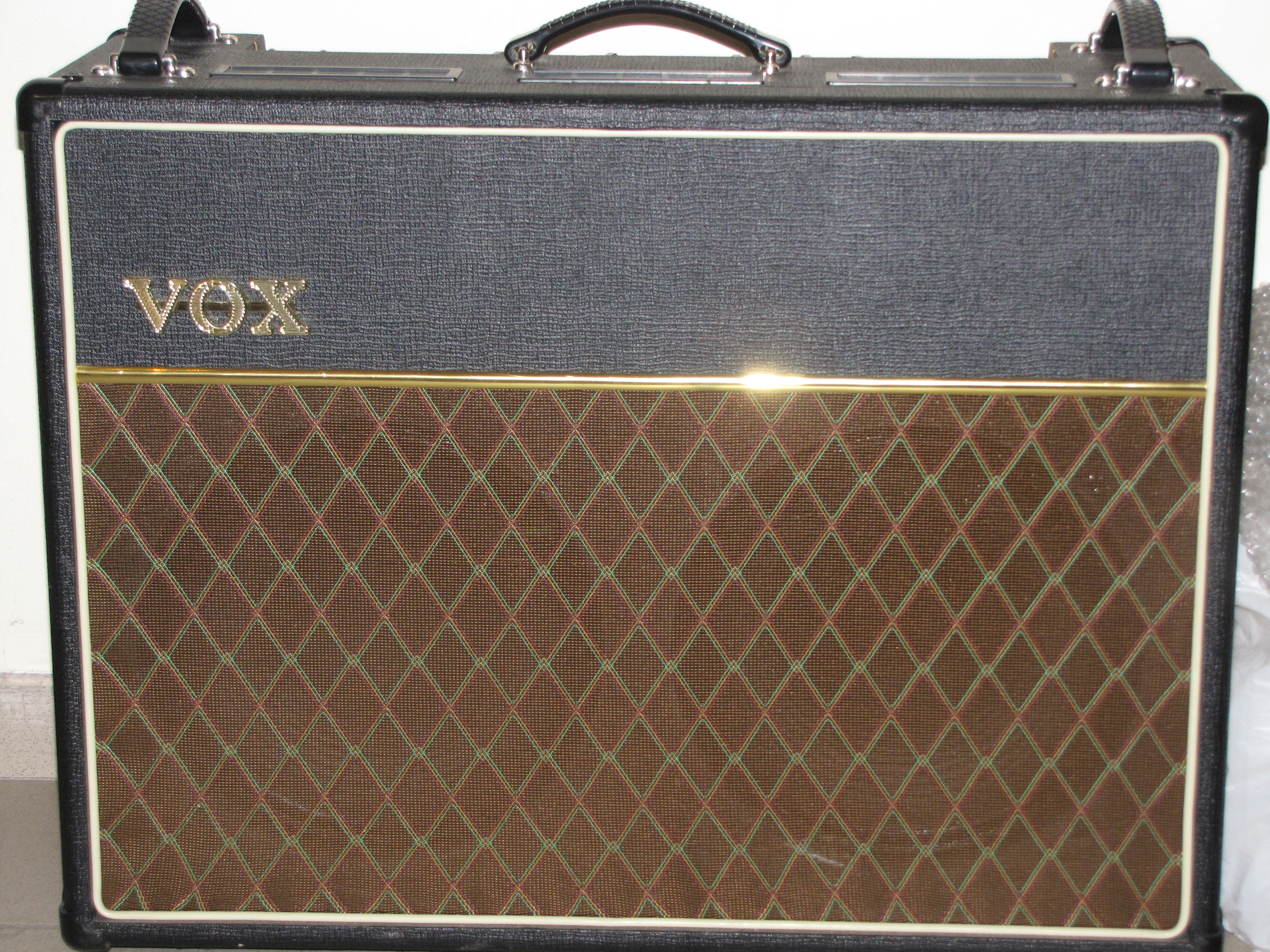
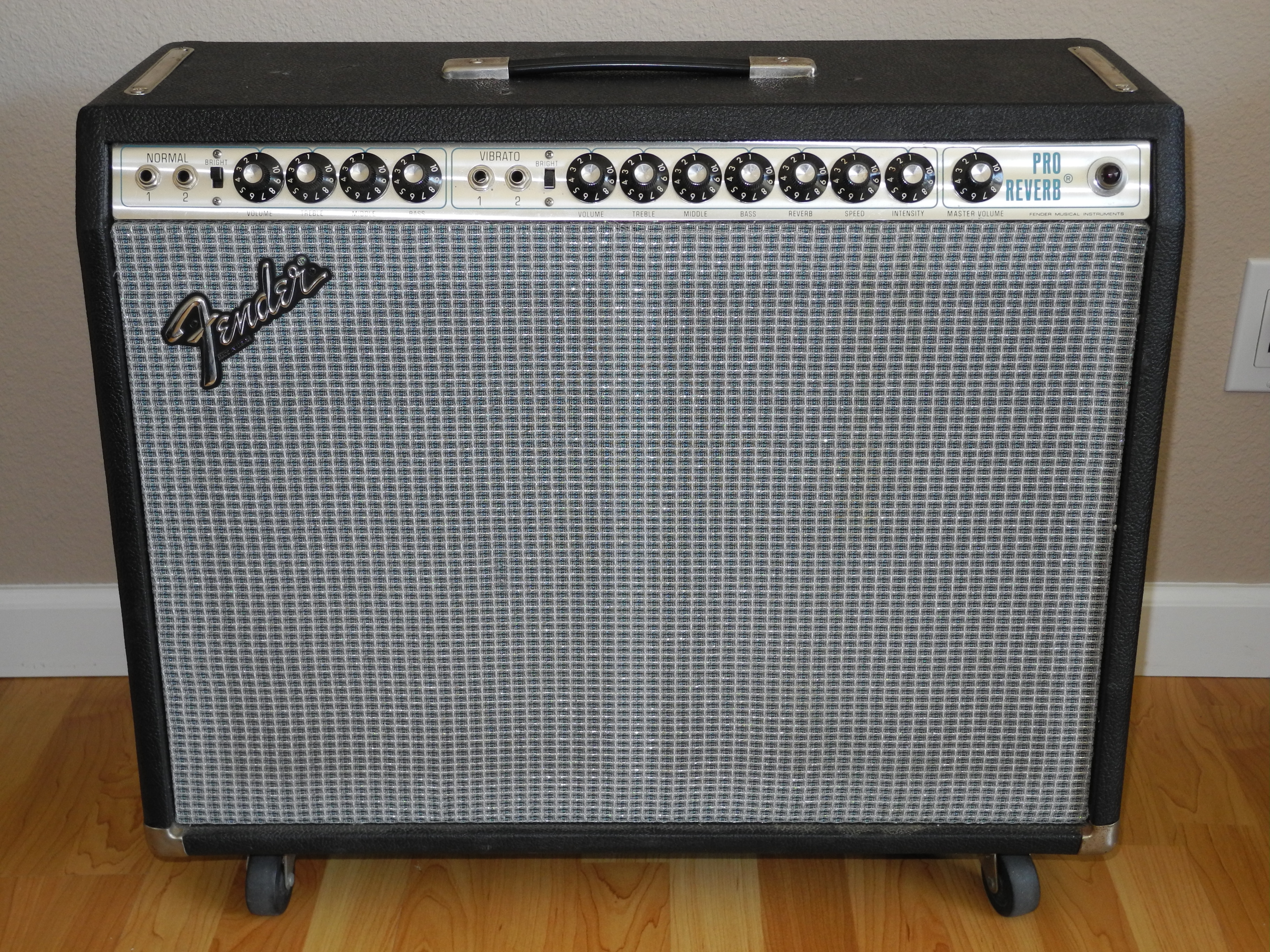
Vox AC30 and Fender Pro Reverb amplifiers were used by Tommy Scott on the album.

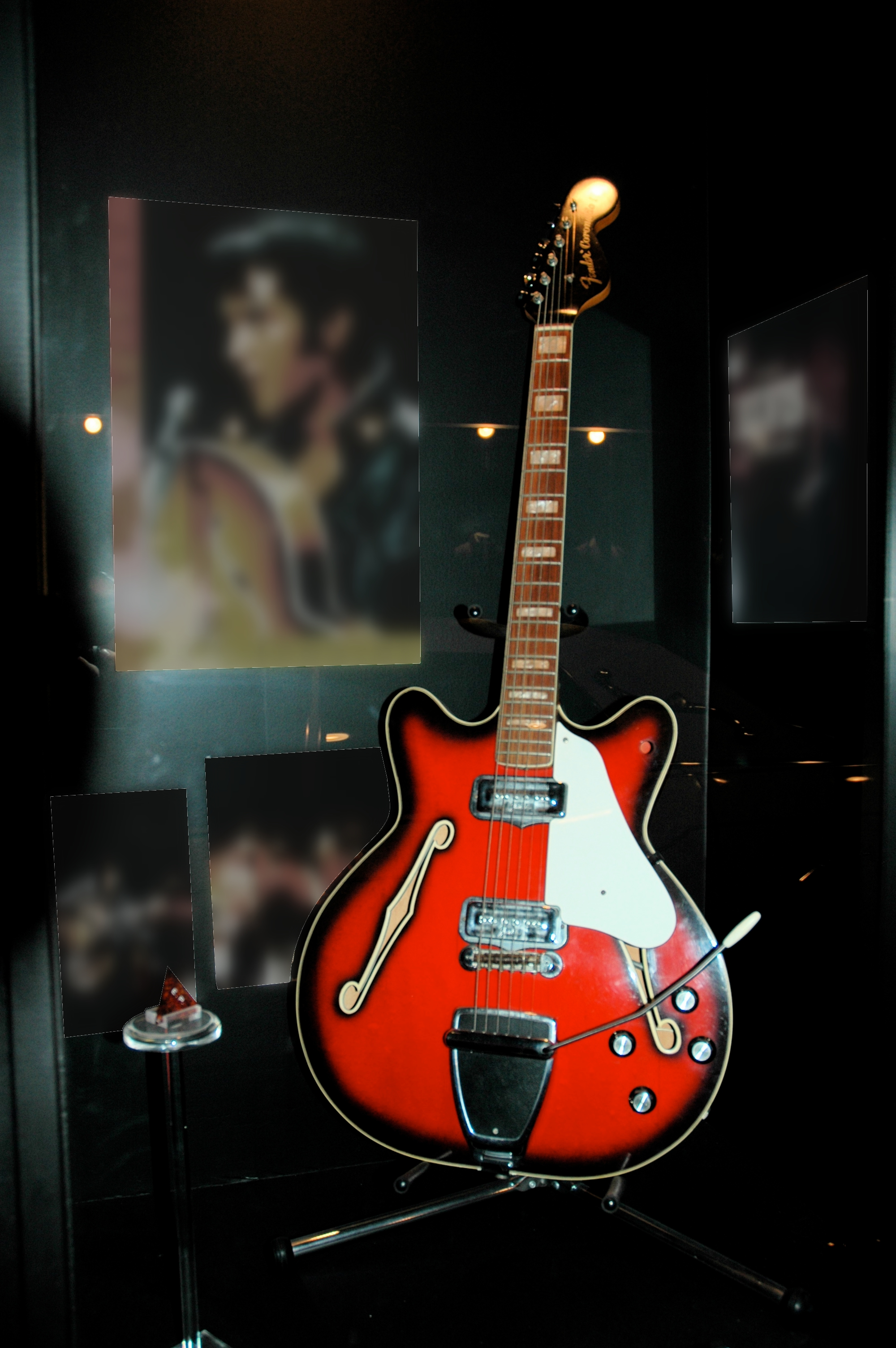
A Fender Coronado, similar to the model Tommy Scott played on the album.

The band recorded Tin Planet in late 1997 and early 1998 at Parr Street Studios, Liverpool, the same studio that they recorded Spiders in. The album was also mixed and mastered at the studio. Although Murphy had rejoined the band, he was often distracted by other occurrences, and Scott in fact played a majority of the guitars present on the record, although this was not the result of a band rift; as "it's accepted that when in the studio, whoever's around will play whatever's at hand," and "Tommy and Jamie have both played everything." Scott, the main lyricist for the band, wrote many of the album's songs on guitar, "so it makes sense for me to play them. But it's good to have Jamie's angle on things 'cos I like my jazz chords and Jamie loves to stick his distortion on and play straight rock 'n' roll."

Scott used Fender Pro Reverb and Vox AC30 amplifiers on the album, and his Fender Coronado guitar, the only guitar that he owned at the time. Scott, less phased with guitar "snobbery" than Murphy, explained, "to be honest, I prefer to put my guitar straight into the desk and I use pedals or the desk's own effects. Sometimes all this snobbery about amps is a load of bullshit. For instance, the AC30 I used was crap!" In an interview, when Griffiths commented that "people think that if they use the same equipment at The Beatles, then their music's going to sound to the same. But it's all about the vibe created on the day," Scott added that "Jamie's a sucker for all that shit. He's got his twin Marshalls and his six million effects on stage, but he's living the whole lifestyle, bless 'im."

Two guest musicians played on the album; flautist Ben Roberts and percussionist Ged Lynch. The record was co-produced and engineered by Jeremy Wheatley, with assistance from Andrea Wright and Dave Buchanan. Wheatley had previously engineered most of the tracks from Spiders. Very shortly after the completion of the album, but prior to its release, drummer Andy Parle left the band, instantly being replaced by Leon Caffrey, formerly of Proper. Parle had become a "latent casualty", which was ironic as he was the healthiest member during the band's period of problems. Caffrey had been a friend of the group for a long time, and made his debut with the band in the promotion of Tin Planet.

For "The Ballad of Tom Jones", Cerys Matthews of the Welsh band Catatonia, who Space had supported live back in 1996, was brought in to duet with Scott, which fueled rumours in the press that the two were linked romantically, when in fact they were just good friends. Yorkie provided the scratch-track for Matthews' vocals in the song's demo.

== Artwork ==
Artist and musician Mike Badger, pictured here in 1997, helped provide the title and artwork for the album.

Mike Badger, a Liverpool-based musician and fine art sculptor, as well as a founding member of The La's, was commissioned by the band to create the visuals for Tin Planet, as they wanted a local artist that they knew personally to work with them. At the time, the band did not have a title for the record. Badger had been constructing sculptures out of scrapped metal objects and appliances shaped to look like aliens and robots, and was planning to use them for an animated Super 8 film he was working on with Paul Simpson in their spare time, entitled Tin Planet. The film eventually never got finished, but the band realised that the name was a perfect fit for the album, and without haste Badger granted them permission to use it.

Badger found producing the artwork challenging, as he discovered at the last minute that each individual piece of the robot sculpture were being photographed separately, resembling an Airfix model kit, before it was being assembled, whereas he had presumed that only the finished sculpture would be shot. The completed robot ended up appearing on the back of the sleeve, and was donated by Badger in 2011 to be exhibited at the Museum of Liverpool. Badger would also go on to produce the covers for the "Avenging Angels" and "Begin Again" singles, as well as the music video for "Avenging Angels" and a television commercial promoting the album.

Alongside the standard CD packaging, earlier limited editions of Tin Planet came with a special metallic tin packaging.

== Reception ==
Professional ratings
Review scores
Source	Rating
AllMusic	3/5 stars
NME	8/10
Select	2/5
The Great Rock Discography	7/10

Upon its release, Tin Planet was met with critical and commercial acclaim, receiving a rare five-star rating from Q Magazine, although some critics were still eager to peg them as a novelty act. The album's lead single "Avenging Angels" was made NME's Single of the Week. Allmusic's Jason Damas noted how, "before the release of Tin Planet, lead vocalist Tommy Scott made reference to the album as being one of the finest pop records ever made." Later reflections on the album have been mixed, with bandmembers voicing their disappointment with the slicker sound compared to Spiders, and feeling that their label Gut Records were trying to manipulate them into becoming, in their words, "the next Beautiful South".

== Aftermath ==
After touring and promotional commitments of Tin Planet concluded in late 1998, Space returned to the studio to commence work on their third album, tentatively titled Love You More than Football. However, Gut Records objected to Edwyn Collins being chosen as producer, and forced the band to rework the material several times, delaying its release for over two years until it was eventually scrapped in July 2001. By that time the band had terminated their contract with Gut and Jamie Murphy, who was growing restless and distant from the others, was dismissed from the line-up. Love You More than Football now primilarly exists as a bootleg, due to a promotional copy on CD-R which circulated around May 2000.

As a result, Space, now reduced to a four-piece, laid low for a couple of years, sporadically releasing several songs as a free-to-download MP3s through their website, becoming one of the first major groups to do so. However, they did not release another studio album proper until Suburban Rock 'n' Roll, which was recorded in 2002 and released through RandM Records in 2004.

On August 19, 2022, Tin Planet was released on vinyl for the first time through Demon Records. It entered at #25 on the Official UK Vinyl Album Charts.

== Track listing ==
No.	Title	Writer(s)	Length
1.	"Begin Again"	Tommy Scott, Space	3:11
2.	"Avenging Angels"	Scott, Space	2:59
3.	"The Ballad of Tom Jones" (featuring Cerys Matthews)	Scott, Space	4:11
4.	"1 O'Clock"	Jamie Murphy, David Palmer, Franny Griffiths, Scott, Space	4:05
5.	"Be There"	Scott, Griffiths, Space	2:49
6.	"The Man" (semi-instrumental)	Griffiths, Space	3:53
7.	"A Liddle Biddy Help from Elvis"	Scott, Griffiths, Space	3:28
8.	"The Unluckiest Man in the World"	Scott, Space	3:25
9.	"Piggies"	Murphy, Palmer, Griffiths, Space	3:15
10.	"Bad Days"	Scott, Space	3:24
11.	"There's No You"	Scott, Space	3:46
12.	"Disco Dolly"	Scott, Griffiths, Space	3:52
13.	"Silence"		0:04
14.	"Fran in Japan" (instrumental)	Griffiths, Space	7:13

- Lead vocals on tracks 1, 2, 3, 5, 7, 8, 10, 11 and 12: Tommy Scott
- Lead vocals on tracks 4 and 9: Jamie Murphy

=== Bonus tracks (2+CD edition) ===
- "Stress Transmissions"
- "Stress Transmissions" (5 O'Clock Shadow Mix)

== Charts ==
=== Weekly charts ===
Chart (1998)	Peak position
Australian Albums (ARIA)	74
New Zealand Albums (RMNZ)	11
Scottish Albums (OCC)	5
UK Albums (OCC)	3

=== Year-end charts ===
Chart (1998)	Position
UK Albums (OCC)	66

== Certifications ==
Region	Certification	Certified units/sales
United Kingdom (BPI)	Gold	100,000^{^}
^{^} Shipments figures based on certification alone.
