= Stockbridge Village =

Area of Knowsley, Merseyside, England

Coordinates: 53.4357°N 2.8609°W

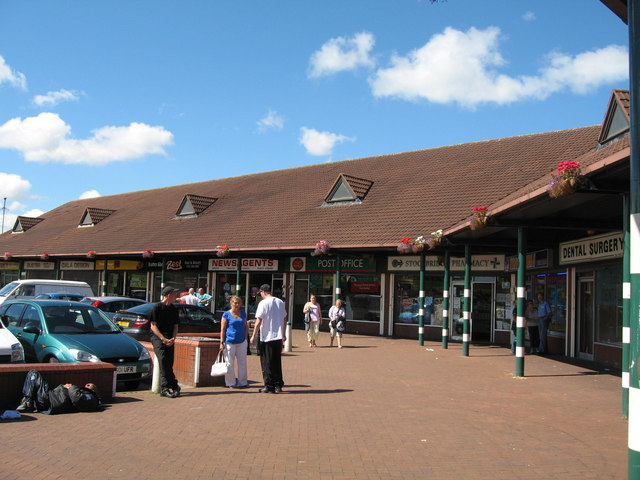
- The Croft, Stockbridge Village

- Location within Merseyside
- Population: 6,018 (2011)
- Metropolitan borough: Knowsley
- Metropolitan county: Merseyside
- Region: North West
- Country: England
- Sovereign state: United Kingdom
- Post town: LIVERPOOL
- Postcode district: L28
- Dialling code: 0151
- Police: Merseyside
- Fire: Merseyside
- Ambulance: North West
- UK Parliament: Knowsley

Stockbridge Village is an area of Knowsley in Merseyside, England. The population of the ward at the 2011 census was 6,018. Up until 1983, the area was formerly known as Cantril Farm, and was the subject of an article in a special report by The Economist entitled "A new kind of ghetto", which described it a predominantly White area of high unemployment and low aspirations.

Corner Brook, Cantril Farm part of the estate

Barons Hey, Cantril Farm part of the estate

== History ==
Formerly within the historic county of Lancashire, the original Cantril Farm council estate was built in the mid-1960s to rehouse some 15,000 people from inner-city slum clearances in Liverpool. It was part of a deal to rehouse some 200,000 people from inner-city Liverpool in new residential areas beyond the city's borders, with other families from inner-city Liverpool moving to other overspill places including Leasowe, Huyton, Kirkby, Halewood, Skelmersdale and Runcorn New Town from the 1950s into the 1970s.

The land on which Cantril Farm would be built was purchased by Liverpool council in 1961 for a sum of £132,500.

The first tenants arrived on the estate in 1965, but initially the estate lacked facilities such as public transport, health care and shops, with most of these facilities not being provided until at least 1967. Mobile shops were located on the estate until permanent buildings were erected. The first pub on the estate was opened in 1968, around the same time that the first bus routes were established. Subways were also erected to underpass the busiest roads on the estate for pedestrian safety. Small supermarkets were also erected in the late 1960s and the Withens Shopping Centre opened in 1970.

St Jude's Parish Church was opened in 1972 at a cost of £40,000. St Albert the Great Roman Catholic church opened in 1966, and later on Cantril Farm Methodist Church opened. A second Roman Catholic parish church, St Brigid's, opened in October 1967.

In the autumn of 1968 two primary schools were opened on the estate - St Albert's and St Brigid's.

Cantril High School was also opened to serve pupils aged 11–16, but it was only open for just over 20 years, closing in July 1991 due to falling pupil numbers. It was damaged in an arson attack not long after its closure and eventually demolished.

By 1980, the estate was in decline. Unemployment and crime had increased. Cantril Farm was the scene of a riot in August 1981 soon after the Toxteth riot several miles away. By 1982, unemployment on the estate was at 49% among males and 80% among young people, around four times the national average. Most of the estate's retail units were vacant. Household spaces were also becoming vacant as families sought to leave the estate. Vacant properties were difficult to let. Few tenants had opted to buy their homes under Right to Buy. Two school buildings on the estate were badly damaged in arson attacks and had to be completely rebuilt. Car theft was a major problem in the 1980s and 1990s.

Stockbridge Village Trust Limited was established on 18 February 1983 as a non-profit-making Private Company limited by guarantee. The estate within the Borough of Knowsley, which was owned by the Borough Council, was conveyed to the Trust on 6 April 1983, at the District Valuer's valuation of more than £7million. This resulted in the Cantril Farm Estate being split, with two-thirds owned by the Trust, and one third owned by Liverpool City Council. The main part of the estate was renamed Stockbridge Village, while the section in Liverpool retained the Cantril Farm name.

As well as the demolition of some of the tower blocks, some 600 maisonettes and 340 low-rise flats were also bulldozed. The remaining properties were refurbished. The layout of the estate was altered to improve vehicular access. The shopping and recreational areas of the estate were also improved or replaced.

All council properties on the estate were transferred to the Village housing association in 1995.

In 2010, further regeneration work began on Stockbridge Village seeing a number of changes, such as the famous Heat Waves swimming baths being demolished as well as St Dominic's school being replaced by a new community centre and two new schools.

== Notable residents ==
- Footballer Micky Quinn grew up on the estate and lived there from 1967 until 1986. His father Mick Quinn senior later ran a pub in the area.
- Footballer Ian Bishop moved to the estate just after he was born in 1965. He went on to play for clubs including Everton, Manchester City and West Ham United.
- Former Liverpool striker David Fairclough grew up on the estate after moving there as a child in the 1960s.
- Comedian/actor Craig Charles moved to the estate just after he was born in 1964 and lived there until the 1980s.
- Singer Paul Rutherford, a member of Frankie Goes to Hollywood (whose "Relax" and "Two Tribes" hits topped the UK charts in 1984), also grew up on the estate after moving there as a child from an inner-city slum.
- Tommy Scott of the indie band Space wrote the song "Neighbourhood" about the bandmembers' own experiences growing up on the Cantril Farm area.
- Joey McLoughlin, a professional cyclist who won the Milk Race in 1986, grew up on Cantril Farm as the youngest of 10 children.
- Former goalkeeper Billy Mercer was born on the estate in 1969. He was a youth and reserve goalkeeper for Liverpool from 1985 to 1989 but never played a first team game. He later played for several lower league clubs, and kept goal for Chesterfield in their famous run to the FA Cup semi-finals in 1997.
- Professional boxer Rocky Fielding (Rocky 'from Stocky'), former WBA regular super middle weight world champion comes from the village.
- Ian Byrne, the current Labour Member of Parliament (MP) for Liverpool West Derby, grew up on the estate.

Despite popular belief, no members of the band The Farm were actually from Cantril Farm.
