= Avenging Angels (song) =

1997 single by Space

Single by Space

from the album Tin Planet
- B-side: "I'm Unlike Any Lifeform You've Ever Met"; "Bastard Me, Bastard You"; "Theme from 'Barretta Vendetta'"
- Released: 29 December 1997
- Length: 2:59
- Label: Gut
- Songwriters: Tommy Scott; Space
- Producers: Jeremy Wheatley; Space

Space singles chronology
"Dark Clouds" (1997)	"Avenging Angels" (1997)	"The Ballad of Tom Jones" (1998)

"Avenging Angels" is a song by English band Space, released as the first single from the band's second album Tin Planet on 29 December 1997. The song reached number six on the UK Singles Chart and number 20 in Iceland in January 1998. In Australia, "Avenging Angels" peaked at number 146 on the ARIA Singles Chart.

== Track listings ==
UK CD1

1. "Avenging Angels" – 3:10
2. "I'm Unlike Any Lifeform You've Ever Met" – 3:26
3. "Bastard Me, Bastard You" – 4:26
4. "Theme from 'Barretta Vendetta'" – 6:05

UK CD2

1. "Avenging Angels" – 3:10
2. "Avenging Angels" (John 'OO' Fleming theramin mix) – 7:07
3. "Avenging Angels" (Ultra Vegas mix) – 7:01
4. "Avenging Angels" (The Jumping Soundboy mix) – 6:34
5. "Avenging Angels" (Franny's 'Peaceful Devil' mix) – 4:34
6. "Avenging Angels" (Brainbasher's 'Kick Ass Angel' mix) – 6:20
7. "Avenging Angels" (Jonnie Newman's 'Altered State' mix) – 4:02

UK cassette single

A. "Avenging Angels" – 3:10
B. "Bastard Me, Bastard You" – 4:26

Australian CD single

1. "Avenging Angels" – 3:10
2. "Avenging Angels" (Jonnie Newman's 'Altered State' mix) – 4:02
3. "Avenging Angels" (Franny's 'Peaceful Devil' mix) – 4:34
4. "Avenging Angels" (Ultra Vegas mix) – 7:01
5. "Avenging Angels" (The Jumping Soundboy mix) – 6:34
6. "Theme from 'Barretta Vendetta'" – 6:05

== Charts ==
=== Weekly charts ===
Chart (1998)	Peak position
Australia (ARIA)	146
Europe (Eurochart Hot 100)	33
Iceland (Íslenski Listinn Topp 40)	20
Scotland Singles (OCC)	8
UK Singles (OCC)	6
UK Indie (OCC)	1

=== Year-end charts ===
Chart (1998)	Position
UK Singles (OCC)	138
