= Ryan Clark =

Ryan Clark may refer to:

- Ryan Clark (American football) (born 1979), NFL football player
- Ryan Clark (actor) (born 1983), Australian former actor, best known for Home and Away and lifeguard
- Ryan Clark (musician) (born 1979), co-founder of the band Demon Hunter
- Ryan Clark (snooker player) (born 1992), English snooker player
- Ryan Clark (footballer) (born 1997), Scottish footballer
- Ryan Clark, creator of the games Incredibots and Crypt of the NecroDancer

== See also ==
- Ryan Clarke (disambiguation)
- Rylan Clark (born 1988), English television personality
