= Stan (duo) =

British pop duo

- Genres: Novelty pop
- Years active: 1993
- Labels: Hug Records
- Past members: Kevin Stagg; Simon Andrew

Stan was a pop duo which had a top 40 hit in the UK singles charts in 1993.

== History ==
The Brighton-based duo was made up of guitarist Kevin Stagg and singer Simon Andrew, who took the act name from the first two letters of each surname. Their first single, "Suntan", written by the duo with producer Tobias Lunch, was released on the Gut Records imprint Hug, and reached number 40 in the UK in July 1993.

Stan's deal with Hug was for three singles and an album, but "Suntan" was their only charting success, as a follow-up Christmas single ("Turkey (Don't Give Me Nun)!") was not a hit, and there were no further releases from the duo.
