= Money / Kill Me =

"Money" / "Kill Me"

Single by Space

from the album Spiders
- Released: 30 October 1995
- Recorded: 1995
- Genre: Trip hop
- Length: 4:01 ("Money"); 3:31 ("Kill Me")
- Label: Gut Records
- Producers: Space, Yorkie, Ian Richardson & Nick Coler

Space singles chronology
"If Its Real" (1993)	"Money" / "Kill Me" (1995)	"Neighbourhood" (1996)

"Money" and "Kill Me" are two songs by the Liverpool-based Indie rock band Space, released together as a double A-side in October 1995. As their debut for Gut Records, it is also the first single to be released from their debut album, Spiders The track did not chart in the UK. "Money" was re-recorded for Spiders with a more bombastic sound.

== Track listings ==
- CD:
1. "Money" (7" Radio Edit)
2. "Kill Me" (7" Radio Edit)
3. "Money" (Space Club Mix)
4. "Kill Me" (Space Club Mix)
- '12:
1. "Money" (Space Club Mix)
2. "Kill Me" (Space Club Mix)
3. "Money" (7" Radio Edit)
4. "Kill Me" (7" Radio Edit)
