= Neighbourhood (song) =

1996 single by Space

Single by Space

from the album Spiders
- B-side: "Turn Me On to Spiders"; "Rejects"
- Released: 25 March 1996
- Genre: Ska
- Length: 3:28
- Label: Gut
- Songwriters: Tommy Scott; Franny Griffiths; Space
- Producer: Stephen Lironi

Space singles chronology
"Money" / "Kill Me" (1995)	"Neighbourhood" (1996)	"Female of the Species" (1996)

Music video
- "Neighbourhood" on YouTube

"Neighbourhood" is a song by Liverpudlian band Space, written by band members Tommy Scott and Franny Griffiths and released as the second single from their debut album, Spiders (1996), and their third single altogether. It was originally released on 25 March 1996 by Gut Records and peaked at number 56 on the UK Singles Chart, but it was later re-released on 21 October that year, this time peaking at number 11. Outside the UK, the song reached number 18 in Iceland, number 22 in New Zealand and number 90 in Australia.

In September 2004, "Neighbourhood" was used by the BBC in an ident for their short-lived series Fat Nation. The line "Who lives in a house like this?" is thought to be a reference to Through the Keyhole, another BBC programme. The song is also on the soundtrack from the 1997 movie Shooting Fish.

== Content ==
The lyrics to "Neighbourhood" were partially inspired by frontman Tommy Scott's upbringing in the Liverpool housing estate Cantril Farm (which has since been reestablished as Stockbridge Village), yet it stays true to the band's twisted sense of humour by depicting a variety of somewhat warped personalities including a man who thinks he's Saddam Hussein, Mr Miller, a "local vicar and a serial killer," a "big butch queen" who's "bigger than Tyson and twice as mean," and others.

== Critical reception ==
Dave Simpson from The Guardian noted that the song "babbled about the transvestites, criminals and serial murdering vicars who, apparently, inhabit their locality." Chuck Campbell from Knoxville News Sentinel named it "an ingratiating introduction to the album, a ska-oriented description of deadbeats and criminals." Melody Maker wrote, "A sleazy, sinister peek behind the curtains of Cantrill Farm life and Tommy Scott's warped imagination. Definitive Space." Melody Maker editor Richard Smith commented, "Lyrically, Space's 'Neighbourhood' is just perv by numbers. It's even got a lyric that namechecks "big butch queens", "transvestites" and, that old favourite of the unimaginative, "vicars". [...] The thing is, there's some genuinely interesting sounds on here—that stretched out twangy guitar, for instance, that keyboard noodling—but they're smothered by Space's trying-so-hard-to-be-interesting lyrics." Music Week gave the song a score of four out of five, adding that "a Latin feel and Spaghetti Western touches give an extra dimension to this foot-tapping groove from the new Liverpuddlian foursome." For the re-release, the magazine again gave it four out of five, writing, "A hint of ska and a steel guitar sound help produce a novelty spin to this re-release, which should continue the Liverpool band's upward rise."

== Track listings ==
=== Initial release ===
- UK cassette single
1. "Neighbourhood" (radio edit)
2. "Turn Me On to Spiders"
3. "Rejects"
- UK CD single
1. "Neighbourhood" (radio edit)
2. "Turn Me On to Spiders"
3. "Rejects"
4. "Neighbourhood" (Live It! club mix)
- UK 12-inch single

A1. "Neighbourhood" (Live It! club mix)
A2. "Neighbourhood" (Live It! instrumental club mix)
B1. "Neighbourhood" (Pissed Up Stomp mix)
B2. "Neighbourhood" (radio edit)

=== Re-issue ===
- UK cassette single
1. "Neighbourhood" (radio edit)
2. "Only Half an Angel"
- UK CD1
1. "Neighbourhood" (radio edit)
2. "Only Half an Angel"
3. "Crisis"
4. "Shut Your Mouth"
- UK CD2
1. "Neighbourhood" (radio edit)
2. "Welcome to the Neighbourhood" (remix by Franny Aspirin)
3. "Nighthood" (remix by Franny Aspirin)
4. "Neighbourhood" (Pissed Up Stomp mix)

== Charts ==
Chart (1996–1997)	Peak position
Australia (ARIA)	90
Europe (Eurochart Hot 100)	74
Iceland (Íslenski Listinn Topp 40)	18
New Zealand (Recorded Music NZ)	22
Scotland Singles (OCC)	10
UK Singles (OCC)	11
UK Airplay (Music Week)	13
UK Club Chart (Music Week)	20
UK Pop Tip Club Chart (Music Week)	20
