= Spiders (album) =

Studio album by Space
- Released: 16 September 1996
- Recorded: 1995–96
- Studio: Parr Street Studios, Liverpool
- Genre: Alternative dance; alternative rock; pop rock; electronic rock; electronic
- Length: 52:48
- Label: Gut
- Producer: Stephen Lironi; Ian Richardson; Nick Coler

Space chronology
Spiders (1996)	Tin Planet (1998)

Singles from Spiders
- 1. "Money / Kill Me" Released: 30 October 1995; 2. "Neighbourhood" Released: 25 March 1996 (re-issue) 21 October 1996; 3. "Female of the Species" Released: 27 May 1996; 4. "Me and You Versus the World" Released: 26 August 1996; 5. "Dark Clouds" Released: 10 February 1997

Spiders is the debut album by English band Space, released on 16 September 1996. After signing to independent label Gut Records, the band recorded Spiders between 1995 and 1996 in Liverpool. The album combines a great wealth of styles and genres, including rock, hip hop, techno and funk. It was the result of the various musical tastes of the band members, with several songs containing several different styles within themselves. Many of the lyrics of the album, mostly written by vocalist Tommy Scott and inspired by films, are darkly humorous and largely story-driven, featuring numerous sadistic characters.

Upon release, the album peaked at #5 on the UK Albums Chart in September 1996, and was certified platinum by the British Phonographic Industry in December 1996. "Spiders" peaked at #133 in Australia, #45 in New Zealand in May 1997, and #35 in Finland. "Money", "Kill Me", "Neighbourhood", "Female of the Species", "Me and You Versus the World" and "Dark Clouds" (the first two combined as a double A-side) were released as singles, though the former was re-recorded for the album. It sold an estimated 800,000 copies between 1996 and 1998. The album received critical acclaim upon release, with critics praising its unique sound and lyrics, and has featured in polls of the best albums of all time.

== Background ==
Space were formed in Liverpool in 1992 by vocalist and bass guitarist Tommy Scott, guitarist and co-vocalist Jamie Murphy and drummer Andy Parle and were initially inspired by The Kinks, Jimi Hendrix and The Who. Scott had been a familiar face on the Liverpool music circuit since the early 1980s; his first band, Hello Sunset, had been supported by an early line-up of The La's. Scott and Murphy had previously performed together in The Substitutes before renaming the band Space. Although most of the band were in their mid-20s, Murphy was only 17, and turned up to the band's first rehearsal session dressed in his school uniform. Space recorded their debut single, "If It's Real", to fulfill a publishing deal they had signed with BMG. It was released on 5 July 1993 as a 12" single through Hug Records, set up by the band's long-time manager and supporter Mark Cowley, with artwork designed by Carl Hunter of The Farm. However, the trio were unhappy with the results, feeling it sounded 'generic' and too similar to other Liverpool bands at the time, and set out to find a new direction.

Whilst on tour, the band discovered the music of hip-hop group Cypress Hill, and quickly became attracted to their bass-driven grooves and use of sampling. Soon after, they decided to recruit Scott's friend and former bandmember in Hello Sunset, Franny Griffiths, who at the time was living and working at a nightclub in Ibiza, in joining the band on keyboards and electronics, establishing the band's trademark, multi-genre style. Although Griffiths was unimpressed by the demo tape that they had sent him, he agreed to join them on the condition that they start writing better material. According to Griffiths, he had to sell off his car in order to purchase his first sampler.

Successful indie label Gut Records (who previously had chart hits with Right Said Fred on their sub-label Tug) paid attention to the band and offered them a deal in January 1995. The label booked Space a session with producer and The KLF collaborator Nick Coler to record what was to be their first single "Kill Me". The proposed B-side "Money", which was recorded in their friend David "Yorkie" Palmer's bedroom "for the price of a £5 electricity card" and mastered onto MiniDisc, proved the more popular choice by the label, so the two songs were released as the double A-side single "Money / Kill Me", which was released in November that year through the sub-label Home. Although the single "left the shops as quickly as it had entered.", it was received positively by the press and marked the start of the recording sessions for Spiders, with both songs reappearing on the album; however, "Money" was re-recorded.

== Recording ==
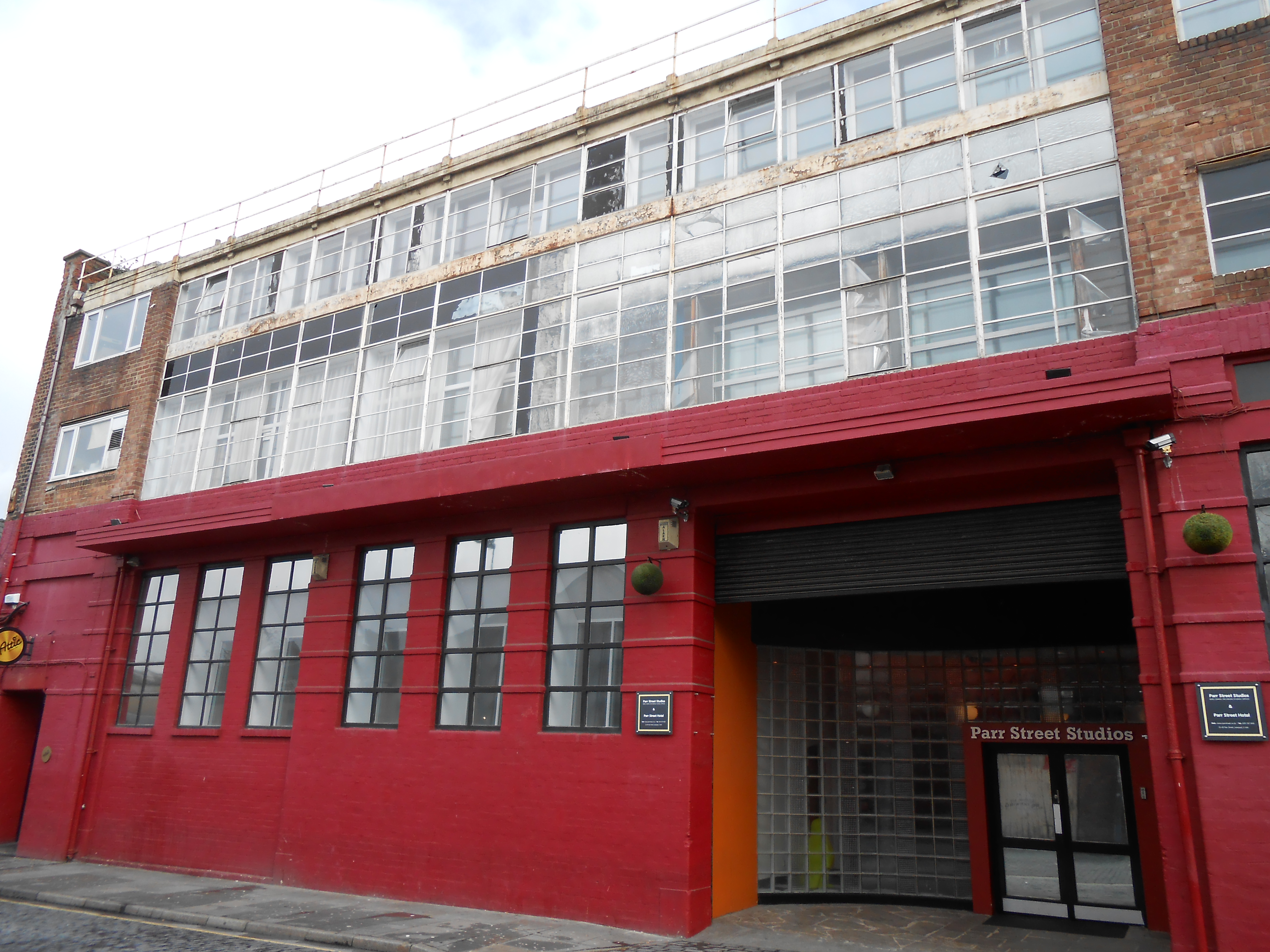
Parr Street Studios, Liverpool, where the album was recorded.

The band recorded the entirety of Spiders in Parr Street Studios, Liverpool, between 1995 and 1996. Stephen Lironi, fresh off working on Black Grape's It's Great When You're Straight...Yeah, was brought on to produce the album, with the exception of "Kill Me" which was produced by Ian Richardson and Nick Coler, a song which was also mixed and engineered by Alan Douglas The other songs on the album were mixed by Jeremy Wheatley, who also engineered all the tracks except "Neighbourhood", which was engineered by Andy Kowalski. Gerald Lynch performs as a guest percussionist on five of the album's songs, with Tony Pierce providing trumpet on "Dark Clouds" and "Charlie M". It was subsequently mixed in three London studios; Air Lyndhurst, Olympic Studios and Mayfair Studios.

Scott composed all of his songs for the album on bass guitar, namely a Framus 5/150 Star Bass and Vox Teardrop from the 1950s and 1960s. In 2018, Scott stated that he has a personal preference of using older instruments and equipment, saying "I was against effects back then, to tell you the truth. I’m not into being retro for its own sake, but basically I just couldn’t be arsed pressing loads of pedals. My sound just needed to be dubby. I took all the treble right off the amps". An Ibanez fretless bass was used in the recording of "Female of the Species" to emulate an upright bass, as according to Scott, "it was the only way to get that sound. I was dead against it at first, because it seemed so naff and cheesy. At the time, only people who had their basses really high on their chests played those instruments".. "Female of the Species" was initially performed using a straight beat, until Griffiths came up with the idea to "stick scratching samples and a hip-hop swing underneath the track". As such, in the studio's basement, Parle, using only one microphone ("the minimum of studio technology"), "merely bunged a load of delay on the resulting loop". David "Yorkie" Palmer sang backing vocals on "Neighbourhood", although he had yet to officially join the band, though he assisted them in recording many of the album's B-sides.

== Composition ==
=== Music ===
Spiders was described by critics as disregarding genre, and displays influence from a large array of genres and styles, such as hip hop, "brooding" Eastern European folk music, funk, techno, indie dance and Hawaiian xylophone music. Parts of the album are said to echo British bands such as Squeeze, the Kinks, Madness and Buzzcocks as well as crooner Frank Sinatra and The Walker Brothers. According to Consumable Online, "many of the tracks offer two or three completely distinct styles within four minutes of pop bliss." They described the album as "why full albums were invented, instead of singles" and said "the only common thread" between the tracks is their alternative pop sensibility. The magazine reckoned the closest comparison for Spiders would be the "psychedelic dance beats of Shaun Ryder's groups, Happy Mondays and Black Grape".

"Basically what gets our sound is we see the four of us as a democracy, There's no one leader in the band, so if [keyboardist Franny Griffiths] is into techno, then why shouldn't there be a techno track on the album. I like Sinatra, movies and things like that so that's why I like stories. Andy Parle's into hip hop, so that's why there are hip hop beats all over the place."

— Tommy Scott speaking to the UWO Gazette.

The album's combining of rock and electronic elements has been described as "a marriage in perfect harmony" where "the guitars don't lead and the beats don't overpower." The Daily Trojan described the balance as follows: "The album smoothly flows from song to song with underlying guitars that accent the friendly techno beats provided by keyboard player Franny Griffiths. The effect is one that gives each song a distinct atmosphere while seldom giving away too much control to either techno or rock. Electronic blips are not overused and show up only to give songs more character." There are also found sound elements to the album; Parle explained: "When we were in Hong Kong, we heard these children saying prayers, it was like a mad wailing sound. Straight away we got out a dictaphone and started taping it. If something's going to make a track sound better we'll use it. As long as it's not contrived."

Although the band and the album have been considered Britpop, the band and several music critics have disavowed the connection to the genre; Consumable Online said the band "bears relation to their Britpop neighbors only in their decidedly British accents and their country of origin". Similarly, Dotmusic said the band has "never fitted into any of the post-Britpop guitar band moulds". Although the NME noted the band were seen as "weirdly comic relief from Britpop and Noelrock," they also said they were "as much, if not more, in keeping with a classic British pop lineage as any of those bands"." One reviewer noted how the band were out "to destroy retro-gazing Britpop from within".

=== Lyrics ===
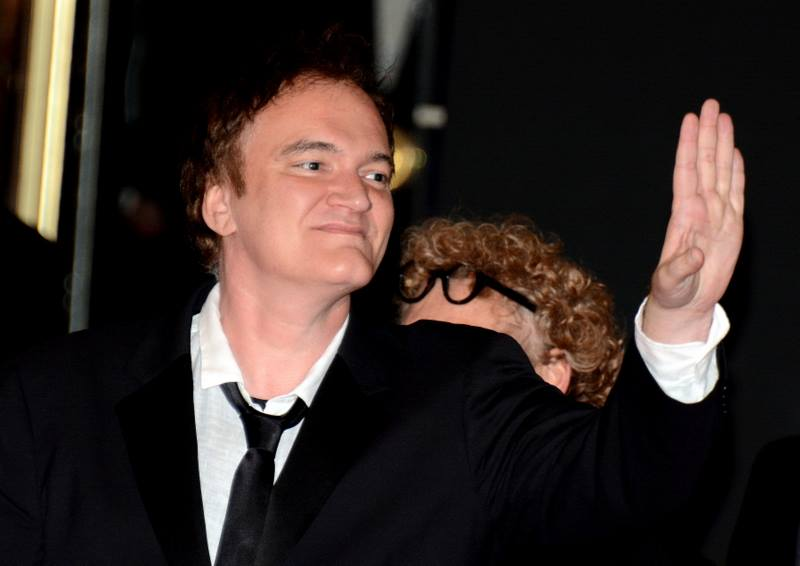
Quentin Tarantino and Looney Tunes were influences on Tommy Scott's songwriting.

The lyrics of the album are mostly written and sung by Scott, with five other songs written and sung by Murphy; the unusual lyrics have been described as "blood-stained" and "writing madness". Scott said "I get my ideas from Quentin Tarantino movies and Looney Tunes cartoons. We'll never write ordinary love songs. We're more likely to write 'I met a girl and she's in love with me so she poisoned my entire family'." Much of Scott's childhood was spent watching violent American movies on television, which were an influence on the lyrics, but "instead of just relying on the sadistic imagery," the band "go for the full subversive effect by placing those images within the context of upbeat, chipper melodies". "I see the songs I write as soundtracks for particular stories in my head," Scott said, "Musically I like old stuff like Roy Orbison, and some new stuff like Tricky, but movies are the big thing for me. I've never really had heroes in music".

Scott commented that "'tis one of life's sweetest pleasures to see Space fans happily bop along whilst singing lines like 'Kill me, kill me/Oh won't you kill me,'" adding that "if the music sounded like some of the lyrics, I'd probably kill me-self. I like seeing your average grandmother or mum on the street singing along to 'Mister Psycho' but not realizing she's singing a song about a psychopath." Fearing some might misinterpret the lyrical intention, Scott affirmed "it's not done in a macho way. We're not trying to be macho, saying that we're tough. We're not like that. I grew up on films, watching films, so that's all that's in me mind. All I'm doing is telling little stories." Griffiths explained, "some of it's like cartoon humour, where you get hit by that big mallet but still get up and walk away."

== Structure ==
Opening song "Neighbourhood" is an "exotically-flavoured show tune" which features elements of "spy theme music" and a "mish-mash of styles". The song's lyrics concern of characters in the "neighbourhood" such as a "local tranvestite", a serial killer vicar, "the big butch queen" and "the folks who make a living off of crime - but are never there because they're all doing time". "Mister Psycho" features "bizarre faux-Spanish accents", whilst "Female of the Species" is an "ode to a female lover who practices witchcraft". Andy Parle said "I think we would all agree that females have more intelligence than males. And that's what makes them more dangerous." The "goofy number" has been described as "Burt Bacharach meets alternative lounge music" which is "sprinkled with some xylophones" and contains a background of "Mexican cha-chas". "Money" is an oom-pah-inspired track with a vocal delivery derived from Kurt Weill and Bertolt Brecht's The Threepenny Opera.

"Me & You Vs the World", with lyrics inspired by 1994 film Natural Born Killers, is said to emulate the "early British pop of the 60's in that same vein as the Kinks and Herman's Hermits". Reviewer Todd Martens, who called it the "most pop-infected tune on the album," described the song as a "sweepingly cinematic coming-of-age tale about two star-crossed lovers turning to crime easily breaks free of conventional pop form without disrupting the song in the slightest. Scott lurches into a spoken-word verse when the narrator gets shot, and the music all but stops except for a hazy and slow pulsating techno throb. The guitars suddenly rise at just the right moment and turn the tune back into the catchy-as-heck pop melody that finishes with a couple happy to go to hell together."

"Love Child of the Queen", a tongue-in-cheek guitar pop song, is the first of three consecutive tracks written and sung by Jamie Murphy. "No-One Understands" is a "satirical lament" according to Johnny Cigarettes of NME, which features "overly mixed guitars" which make the song "maddeningly and engrossingly repetitive", whilst "Voodoo Roller" takes inspiration from the 1995 film The Usual Suspects. "Drop Dead" is a funk rock track sung from the point of view of a celebrity stalker, whilst "Dark Clouds" is an ironic "holiday siesta" featuring a trumpet solo."

"Major Pager" concerns then-Prime Minister John Major "selling E's to the Russians", a lyric that made musical journalist Colin Larkin surprised that the band didn't end up receiving litigation." "Charlie M." is a "Charles Manson fantasy" which features "Mickey Mouse screwing Minnie". The closing track, "Growler" is a techno instrumental composed and performed by Griffiths alone that uses a prominent voice sample of Cheech and Chong from the film Up in Smoke; writing of the track, Consumable Online said "it doesn't hit 160 beats a minute, but it could easily fit in at a rave. The album's title track is a hidden track at the end of American editions of the album. The song concerns Scott's girlfriend's arachnophobia; Scott explained "that song is about me girlfriend. Basically, I know that she's terrified of spiders but if anyone, like say you come up and tried to hit me, she'd kill ya. She's not frightened of anything in the world except spiders." Journalist Stuart Bernan explained "that's Tommy for ya, expressing his romantic side by playing on his girlfriend's worst fear." Imprint magazine said the song offers "some sound relationship advice which might not sit too well with any of Space's male fans who value their testicles".

== Release ==
Spiders was released by Gut Records in the United Kingdom on 16 September 1996. In the United States, it was released by Gut and Universal Records on 14 January 1997. Scott chose to adorn the album artwork with numerous tarantulas, which also gives the album its title; he explained "some people can't even put the CD on the [player]. They have to get their friends to put on the CD for them. The reason we put it on the LP cover is simply just to test our fans, because we know there's loads of people who are terrified by spiders, and if they really love us that much, they'll still go out and buy it."

In the words of Dotmusic, "Space's idiosyncratic pop sensibility coupled with Gut's marketing approach has proved to be a winning combination." The label was used to "working with acts that don't necessarily seek to conform", and, having started life as a plugging company, "its reputation in this field has helped to harness Radio One support for the singles and secure TV appearances on shows such as Chris Evans' TFI Friday". Due to the small size of Gut, the entire label's staff "[pulled] out all stops" for the album. Guy Holmes, managing director of Gut, was pleased with the album's success; in late 1996 he stated "it's been brilliant, absolutely fantastic. It's all about building a band properly without any hype and letting the records speak for themselves. With 120,000 albums sold, what more can you say?"

In the United States, some pipped Spiders as a potential success in the advance of electronica, and especially rock bands that mixed electronica with rock instrumentation; in February 1997, the Daily Trojan commented that "the electronic onslaught is underway, and if U2's Pop successfully brings techno to mainstream rock audiences, Space deserves more than a cut of the crowd." The band were not expecting any American success, concerned that Spiders "might sound too European" due to "its dance beats, fuzzy guitar, and singer Tommy Scott's jaunty vocals". The album nonetheless found a small audience in the United States because of the band's college radio following, with the band receiving heavy rotation on small American radio stations in early 1997, and "Female of the Species" being popular on MTV and college radio. The first 15,000 American copies came with a bonus disc featuring songs only released in the UK.

=== Singles ===
"The true story is, me and Tommy wrote 'Female of the Species' for a B-side. We thought the record company were crazy when they said it was an A-side. We thought it was too weird. Lo and behold, as soon as radio stations got it they went nuts. Totally surprised me, to be honest."

— Andy Parle speaking to the Toronto Sun.

A year ahead of the album's release, "Money / Kill Me" was released as a double A-side in November 1995, containing the original version of "Money", but it did not chart and is considered by the band to be a "test" release and forerunner to the album's official lead single, "Neighbourhood", which was initially released on 25 March 1996 and only peaking at number 56 in the UK Singles Chart. Third single "Female of the Species", released 27 May 1996, turned out to be the band's breakthrough single, reaching number 14 in the UK charts and ultimately selling close to a million copies, despite originally being intended as a B-side. It was the band's only entry on any music chart in the United States when it peaked at number 15 on the Hot Modern Rock Tracks chart in early 1997. In Australia, "Female of the Species" entered the ARIA top 100 singles chart on 11 May 1997, peaking at number 80 in June.

Released on 26 August 1996, "Me and You Versus the World" was the band's first Top 10 hit in the UK, reaching number 9. "Neighbourhood" was then re-released on 21 October 1996, this time reaching number 11. In Australia, "Neighbourhood" entered the ARIA top 100 singles chart on 9 February 1997 at number 90. "Neighbourhood" peaked at number 22 in New Zealand in March 1997. "Dark Clouds" was the final single, released on 10 February 1997 and reaching number 14 in the UK charts.

The band insisted on recording original B-sides for the singles, "a practice foreign to many commercially-focused American bands but popular with British groups". In an interview with The Tufts Daily, Parle said: "When we release something, especially off the album, we know people are going to have that track from the album, and just putting that track out with a new mix of it, we think that's a bit of cheating. So what we always do if we're taking a track off the album, we go back in the studio and do two or three B-sides." Numerous unreleased songs, and remixes of songs from the album, were released as the double album Invasion of the Spiders on 3 November 1997.

== Reception ==
Professional ratings
Review scores
Source	Rating
AllMusic	3/5 stars
The Austin Chronicle	3.5/5 stars
Entertainment Weekly	B+
The Great Rock Discography	7/10
Los Angeles Daily News	3/4 stars
NME	7/10

A commercial success, spurred on by the success of it's singles, Spiders reached number 5 on the UK Albums Chart and was certified platinum by the British Phonographic Industry in December 1996 for sales of over 300,000 copies. A strong seller for a year after its release, it spent 54 weeks on the chart. The album also peaked at number 133 in Australia, number 45 in New Zealand in May 1997, and number 35 in Finland. The album was also successful in Asia. The band's best-selling album, Spiders sold an estimated 800,000 copies between 1996 and 1998.

Spiders was also a critical success, with critics praising its unique sound and unusual lyrics. In the United Kingdom, the band received praise from popular music magazines, including Q and Select. Reviewing the album, Johnny Cigarettes of NME rated the album seven out of ten stating "Space are worthy of a superlative that is all too rare in new British pop right now. No, not 'novelty'. Just 'unique'.", and how he found it unusual for a Northwest band to employ "wit, irony and humour".

The album was also well received by American critics. Todd Martens of the Daily Trojan said that "almost every track on this album contains something worth admiring." Jonathan Dale of the UWO Gazette said that, "regardless of what the interpretation is, Space creates original sounds that, despite the images surrounding it, will always remain witty, whimsical pop that everyone deserves to hear...despite certain phobias."

Later commentary on the album has also been positive. Alex Henderson of AllMusic, in a retrospective review, was largely favourable, calling it "quirky and often highly clever" and "one of the most appealing alternative rock releases of 1996". He praised their "enjoyably twisted sense of humour" and said that, although "the rockers can be overly self-indulgent," Space, "like Frank Zappa and George Clinton, generally use their eccentricity advantageously". The album was highlighted as an "Album Pick" on the website. Writer Colin Larkin rated the album three stars out of five in his 2000 book The Virgin Encyclopedia of Nineties Music.

== Legacy ==
The album has been features in critics' lists of the best albums of 1996 and in some cases of all time. At the end of 1996, Select ranked Spiders at number 23 in their list of the best albums of the year. The album also ranked 9th in NME's readers poll of the 10 best albums of 1996. In 1997, the album ranked 77th in Virgin Megastores' "Chart of the Century" poll of the 100 greatest albums of all time. In 1998, the album ranked 551st in the updated version of the book All Time Top 1000 Albums, a list of the greatest albums of all time that was the result of over 200,000 votes cast by informed music lovers and ranked in order. In 2017, Pitchfork ranked Spiders at number 41 in their list of "The 50 Best Britpop Albums".

"Female of the Species" has also featured in critics' lists. Select named it the 6th best single of 1996. It also ranked at number 40 in NME's list of the top 50 singles of 1996, and The Face ranked it at number 9 in their own list of 1996's 50 greatest singles. Les Inrockuptibles also included in their list of 1996's greatest singles, as did Iguana, who ranked it 39th in their top 50 list. It ranked number 75 in the Triple J poll of the best songs of 1997. In 2013, NME ranked it at number 84 in their list of "The 100 Greatest Britpop Songs". The track was chosen by producer Christine Langan after she heard it on The Chart Show.

Having never been re-released, in 2014, NME included Spiders in its list of "30 Glorious Britpop Albums That Deserve a Reissue Pronto," with one reviewer commenting: "Just reel off those beauties – 'Neighbourhood', 'Me and You vs the World', 'Female of the Species' – it's imperative that a new generation of kids hears these songs. A group of rough and ready Scousers with deathless melodies to burn, Space could’ve been the new Beatles if anyone had thought to make that comparison." In 2016, a limited edition picture disc vinyl of the album was made available on Record Store Day, 20 years after its original release. For its 25th anniversary in 2021, the album was once again reissued on yellow-coloured vinyl. Mister Psycho and Growler, two combat robots that were introduced in the sixth series of Robot Wars, took their names after songs from the album.

=== Touring and aftermath ===
Space played several prolific festivals in this era, and numerous shows that were well received by British critics. A concert played by the band in Dublin in November 1996 was attended by Universal Records staff and their guests; it was integral in the label singing the band in the United States. After the minor success of Spiders and especially "Female of the Species" in the United States, Space toured the US in mid-1997. However, the tour was marked with numerous problems. The band were constantly under stress, and such was its extent that Griffiths developed an ulcer, Scott lost his voice and Murphy, "still only 21, simply lost it completely and had a spell in psychiatric care being fed anti-depressants and milk," whilst Parle eventually left the band, being replaced by Leon Caffrey soon afterwards. After his cameo on Spiders, David "Yorkie" Palmer joined the band in late 1997 as a bassist, but the death of his mother, popular Liverpudlian singer Gladys Palmer, came as a devastation to the band.

Murphy's personal problems led to him missing some of the band's live shows and television appearances, with manager Mark Cowley often filling in during his absence. It was widely rumoured that he depressingly watched Space perform "Dark Clouds" on BBC's Top of the Pops on television, one of the performances he missed, although in fact he was preoccupied with other things and "actually forgotten the single was even out". Scott was terrified that his singing voice was permanently lost, as the cause with originally unknown; he underwent cancer treatment to make sure, but found out his voice was lost due to stress, and he soon recovered. Murphy also soon recovered and rejoined the band in time for the recording of their second album, Tin Planet.

== Track listing ==
No.	Title	Writer(s)	Length
1.	"Neighbourhood"	Tommy Scott, Franny Griffiths, Space	3:28
2.	"Mister Psycho"	Scott, Space	3:40
3.	"Female of the Species"	Scott, Space	3:17
4.	"Money"	Scott, Griffiths, Space	4:01
5.	"Me & You Vs the World"	Scott, Griffiths, Space	3:35
6.	"Lovechild of the Queen"	Jamie Murphy, Space	3:39
7.	"No-One Understands"	Murphy, Space	4:08
8.	"Voodoo Roller"	Murphy, Space	3:15
9.	"Drop Dead"	Scott, Space	4:26
10.	"Dark Clouds"	Scott, Griffiths, Space	3:50
11.	"Major Pager"	Murphy, Griffiths, Space	3:16
12.	"Kill Me"	Murphy	3:31
13.	"Charlie M"	Scott, Space	3:50
14.	"Growler"	Griffiths, Space	4:47

US bonus tracks
No.	Title	Writer(s)	Length
15.	"Spiders" (hidden track)	Scott, Space

== Personnel ==
- Tommy Scott - Bass guitar, vocals
- Jamie Murphy - Guitar, vocals
- Franny Griffiths - Keyboards, synthesizers, sonic manipulations
- Andy Parle - Drums, percussion, loops

== Charts ==
=== Weekly charts ===
Chart (1996)	Peak position
Finnish Albums (Suomen virallinen lista)	35
New Zealand Albums (RMNZ)	45
Scottish Albums (OCC)	5
UK Albums (OCC)	5

=== Year-end charts ===
Chart (1996)	Position
UK Albums (OCC)	35
Chart (1997)	Position
UK Albums (OCC)	90
