= Brian Clarke (disambiguation) =

Brian Clarke (1953–2025) was a British painter, set-designer and architectural artist.

Brian Clarke may also refer to:

- Brian Clarke (footballer, born 1968), English former footballer
- Brian Clarke (Gaelic footballer) (born c. 1975), Irish Gaelic footballer (Kerry)
- Brian Patrick Clarke (born 1952), American actor
- Brian Clarke (author) (1938–2026), English author, journalist and angler

== See also ==
- Bryan Clarke (1932–2014), British scientist
- Brian Clark (disambiguation)
- Ryan Clarke (disambiguation)
