= Brian Clark (cricketer) =

Zimbabwean cricketer (born 1964)

Personal information
- Full name: Brian Anthony Clark
- Born: 3 September 1964 (age 62); Bulawayo, Zimbabwe
- Batting: Right-handed
- Bowling: Right-arm leg break

Domestic team information
- Years: Team
- 1994–1997: Matabeleland
- First-class debut: 14 January 1994 Matabeleland v Mashonaland Under-24s
- Only List A: 2 March 1997 Matabeleland v Mashonaland

Career statistics
Competition	FC	LA
Matches	4	1
Runs scored	150	3
Batting average	25.00	3.00
100s/50s	0/2	0/0
Top score	56	3
Balls bowled	108	–
Wickets	0	–
Bowling average	–	–
5 wickets in innings	–	–
10 wickets in match	–	n/a
Best bowling	–	–
Catches/stumpings	1/–	0/–
- Source: Cricket Archive (subscription required), 6 June 2012

Brian Clark (born 3 September 1964) was a Zimbabwean cricketer. He was a right-handed batsman and a leg-break bowler who played for Matabeleland. He was born in Bulawayo.

Clark made three appearances in the Logan Cup competition of 1993-94, scoring a half century in his debut innings. His second first-class match was slightly more successful still, as he scored a career-best 56 runs in an innings victory, in which he partnered four-time Test cricketer Wayne James to James' highest first-class score of 215 runs.

Clarke was an upper-middle order batsman and an occasional bowler, though he failed to secure a single wicket in 18 overs of bowling.
