= Stephen Lironi =

Steve Lironi
- Born: Stephen Mark Lironi
- Genres: Pop
- Occupations: Record producer; guitarist; drummer
- Years active: 1975–2022

Stephen Mark Lironi is a musician and restaurateur from Glasgow, Scotland.

== Music career ==
Lironi was a drummer, and later guitarist, for a number of Glasgow bands from when he was 11 years old, before joining Altered Images in 1982 as guitarist. After the band broke up, Lironi and singer Clare Grogan worked on a solo album (the unreleased Trash Mad), and formed the band Universal Love School.

In 1989, Lironi co-wrote the song "One Night in Heaven (Mayonaka no Angel)", which reached number 1 on Oricon's weekly charts, recorded by the duo Wink.

In 1993, Lironi turned to production, producing the debut album for Black Grape and Spiders by Space. His biggest commercial success came as co-producer (with the Dust Brothers) for Hanson in 1997, with both single "MMMBop" and parent album Middle of Nowhere topping the charts around the world. His most recent project (as at 2025) was producing the Altered Images album Mascara Streakz in 2022.

== Restaurateur ==
In 2013, after suffering from bowel cancer, Lironi opened a restaurant (Bar Esteban) in London, with the aim of serving tapas using Scottish ingredients. As at 2025, Lironi also owns Maresco (in Soho) and Escocesa (in Stoke Newington).

== Personal life ==
Lironi has been married to Altered Images bandmate Clare Grogan since 1994.

== Awards and nominations ==
- 40th Annual Grammy Awards: Grammy Award for Record of the Year: nominated (for "MMMBop")

== See also ==
- Albums produced ( 6 )
