= Brian C. Clark =

American physiologist

- Education: Western Carolina University; Syracuse University
- Occupation: Physiologist

Brian C. Clark is an American physiologist. He is a distinguished professor in the department of biomedical sciences at Ohio University.
