= Space (English band) =

English band

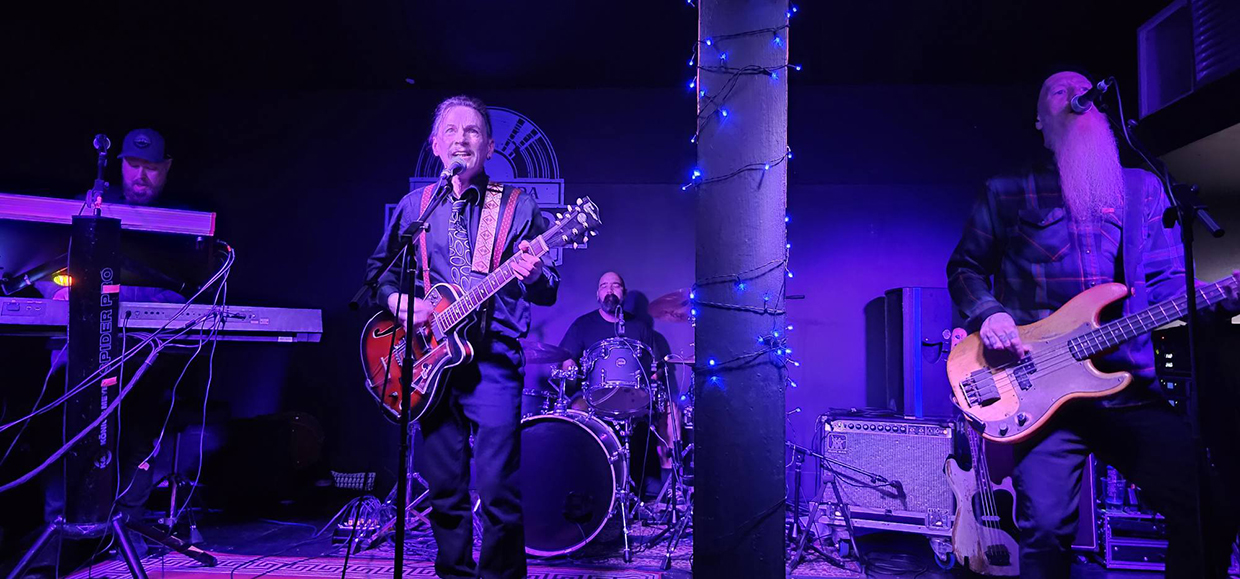
- Space performing at Jacaranda Baltic, 20 December 2025. From left: Franny Griffiths, Tommy Scott, Allan Jones, Phil Hartley.

Background information
- Origin: Liverpool, England
- Genres: Alternative dance; alternative rock; indie rock; trip hop; alternative hip hop; neo-psychedelia
- Years active: 1992–2005; 2011–present
- Labels: Gut Records; Universal Records; RandM; HUG
- Members: Tommy Scott; Franny Griffiths; Phil Hartley; Allan Jones
- Past members: Jamie Murphy; Jamie Island; Andy Parle; Yorkie; Leon Caffrey; Ryan Clarke

Space are a band from Liverpool, England, who formed in 1992 initially as a trio of Tommy Scott (vocals, bass, guitar), Jamie Murphy (vocals, guitar) and Jamie Island (drums), who was later replaced by Andy Parle in 1993. Keyboard player Franny Griffiths joined the line-up a year later, and the band signed to Gut Records in 1995, eventually rising to prominence with hit singles such as "Female of the Species", "Me and You Versus the World", "Neighbourhood", "Avenging Angels" and "The Ballad of Tom Jones", the latter a duet with Cerys Matthews of Catatonia.

Space pursued an eclectic sound dubbed "queasy listening" by critics, embracing electronica and sampling in their work and drawing from genres as diverse as hip hop, techno, post-punk, ska, lounge music, easy listening and film scores, the result of the difference in tastes between band members. The group were also noted for their deliberately tongue-in-cheek, dark-humoured lyrics inspired by films, which frequently deal with topics such as serial killers, failed relationships, social outcasts, and mental illness. Whilst Space's eclecticism and camp humour polarised listeners and critics, they have maintained a devoted cult following.

Space experienced several lineup changes, with Scott being the only consistent member. Their first two albums, Spiders (1996) and Tin Planet (1998), achieved great success and went platinum in the UK, along with scoring eight UK Top 40 singles. Work on their proposed third album, Love You More than Football, was marred by difficulties, and it was eventually shelved once the band were dropped by Gut. The band disbanded in 2005, following low sales and a lukewarm reception of their fourth album Suburban Rock 'n' Roll (2004), which was nonetheless acclaimed by fans.

Scott went on to form The Drellas, which in 2011 morphed into the second incarnation of Space after Griffiths (and briefly Murphy) joined the group. Space have continued to perform live and release studio albums, including Attack of the Mutant 50ft Kebab (2014), Give Me Your Future (2017), and Music for Pleasure Music for Pain (2021). In 2019, twenty years after it was recorded, Love You More than Football was officially released as part of a career-spanning Anthology boxset. The band's eighth album, Ten Neurotic Fairytales, is set to be released in February 2027.

== Biography ==
"We were a bit of a fluke. I'd been in bands before that hadn’t done anything and then we hit on this formula which came after thinking 'well I don’t want to just be one sound'. I like loads of different types of music and I really love movies, so I wanted to throw all that into the mix and that’s how we got our 'thing'.

It made us stand out because we weren’t a typical Liverpool 60s sounding band. It was typical really because all the bands who were getting signed from Liverpool were getting signed for a million pounds and I think we signed for £1,500. Luckily it meant when we did make it we didn’t owe anyone any money."

— Tommy Scott, speaking to The Leader in 2019.

Tommy Scott and Jamie Murphy first met when Murphy, then the age of 15, was hired as a roadie for Scott's then band The Australians. After The Australians split in 1990 prior to an important gig, the pair quickly assembled a new band called The Substitutes (after the song by The Who), with Murphy playing guitar and Scott filling the role of bassist. Murphy would rename the band Space after the working title for the song "My Own Dream" by The Real People, and performed their first gig under the name on 15 May 1992 at The Picket in Liverpool. Jamie Island was briefly the band's drummer before being replaced by Andy Parle, and on 5 July 1993 they released a 12-inch single entitled "If Its Real".

In 1994, Franny Griffiths, who had previously played with Scott in Hello Sunset and The Australians, was brought in to join them on keyboards and electronics, and would eventually establish their distinct style. On 15 January 1995, the band secured a recording contract with Gut Records, who released their first single, "Money", in November that year. The single "Neighbourhood"' followed in March 1996, but it was not until the release of their next single, "Female of the Species", that they achieved top 40 success. This song was also the theme song to the UK programme Cold Feet.

Their debut album Spiders, released in September 1996, enjoyed success and went platinum in the UK. "Female of the Species" also gained moderate airplay on college radio and MTV in the United States, and was widely seen and heard in Australia on the nationally broadcast ABC-TV music video show rage and on the ABC national rock station Triple-J. The line-up increased with the addition of bassist/multi-instrumentalist Yorkie – who started working with the band years before their success with Spiders – in late 1996, so that Scott could concentrate more on vocals and guitar.

A tour of the US followed in mid-1997, during which bandmembers suffered from homesickness, Murphy experienced a nervous breakdown, and Scott lost his voice for two months. The death of Palmer's mother devastated the band, and Parle left the group straight after the second album was complete. He was replaced by Leon Caffrey.

The new record, entitled Tin Planet, was a more mature, focused release than Spiders and was issued in spring 1998, hitting number three in the UK Albums Chart. Like its predecessor, it became a success, but it did upset some fans due to its more softer, pop-friendly songs and the lack of the much more aggressive tracks found on Spiders. In late 1998, for a Honda advertisement, Space recorded a version of The Animals' "We Gotta Get out of This Place", which was featured on The Bad Days EP. The band also recorded a track together with singer Tom Jones for his album Reload, released in 1999.

In 2001, Space parted ways with Gut following certain issues with the label, including the constant postponing of their third album Love You More than Football. Murphy departed from the band the same year, leading to the band retreating from the public eye and release their music to their fans via their website. These recordings were known as Music for Aliens.

After a three-year break from public attention, Space returned in 2004 to release Suburban Rock 'n' Roll, their first proper release of new material since Tin Planet. It failed to earn critical and commercial recognition. The lukewarm reception of the releases and the problems with getting a recording contract, made it financially impossible to carry on. In 2005, Space announced their decision to go their separate ways.

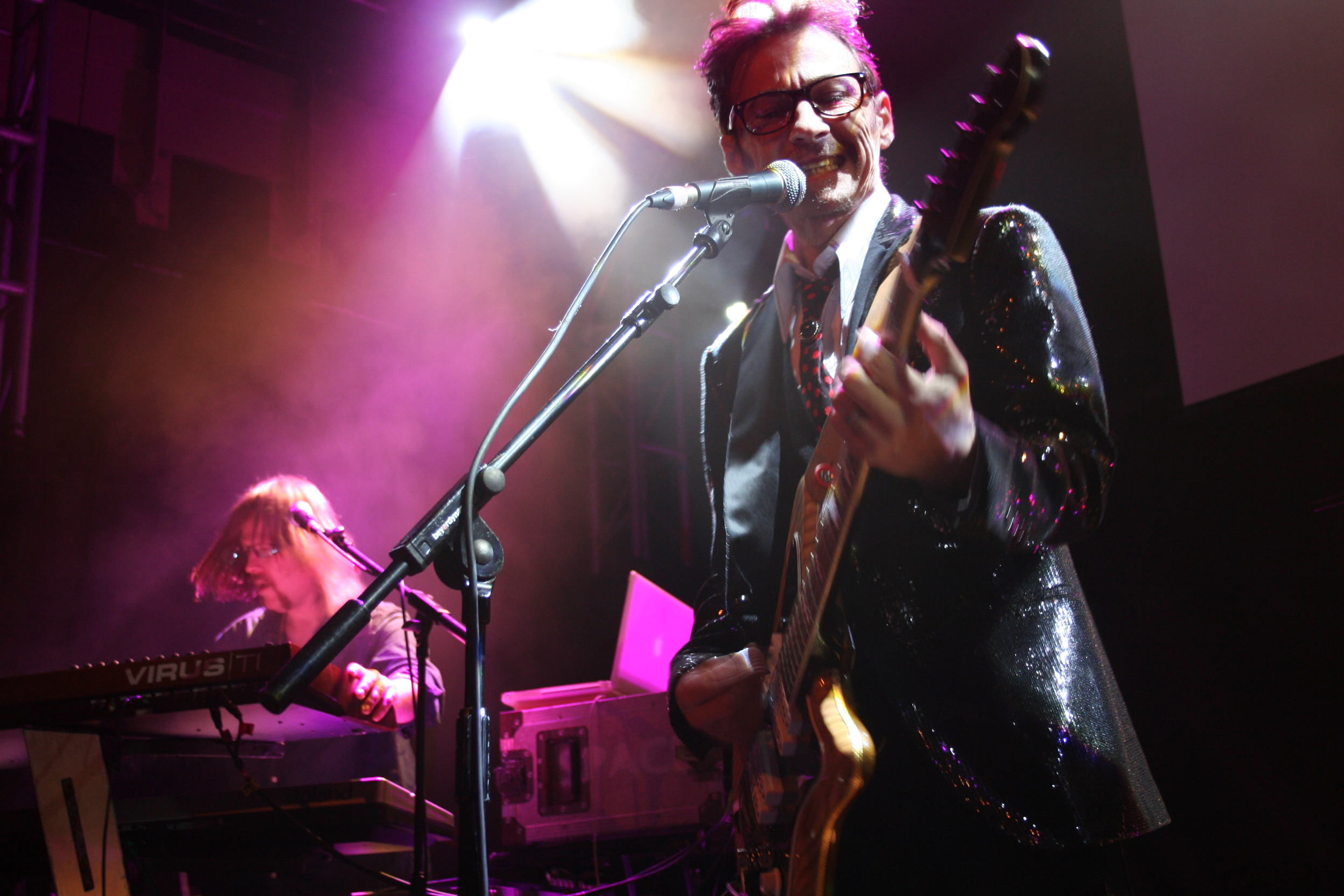
Space performing at Islington Academy, 23 March 2014 (pic: Kris Griffiths)

Since the band's original break-up, most of the former members have continued to play in bands and music industry: Scott, along with Phil Hartley, a former live technician for the group, formed a punk band called the Drellas, which in its final incarnation included Allan Jones on drums and Ryan Clarke on vintage keys. Hartley, who plays bass, also produces for the band, along with other Antipop Records acts such as Metro Manila Aide, The Dead Class, The Temps and Fraktures. Franny Griffiths was with Murphy and Vinnie Camilleri (who played guitar for The Beatles Pre- Ringo drummer Pete Best) with their band Dust, and also making R&B under the name Subway Showdown, while Yorkie is producing for Shack. Franny also co-writes & produces with Vinnie Camilleri for Spaceman V Man.

Andy Parle died on 1 August 2009, aged 42, in Liverpool. Police said they were treating Parle's death as "unexplained" after he was seen to fall while crossing the road. Eyewitnesses described him tripping and falling after trying to run across a road in Liverpool at around 11.30 pm. He was taken to Royal Liverpool Hospital where he died. Palmer stated that he was a "brilliant drummer" and that his death was "the saddest, most tragic end you could have."

In November 2011, Space announced they would reunite for a gig at Christmas at the O2 Academy in Liverpool. The line-up reunited original members Scott, Murphy and Griffiths, and included other musicians who had played with Scott in The Red Scare. They band announced the release of a new album, entitled Attack of the Mutant 50ft Kebab, and a world tour in 2012. After two years in the making (which were disrupted by Murphy's second departure), the album was eventually released in March 2014, preceded by the lead single "Fortune Teller". In July, keyboardist Ryan Clarke left the group to focus on other projects. As part of their 20th anniversary, Space announced a tour throughout March 2014 alongside Republica.

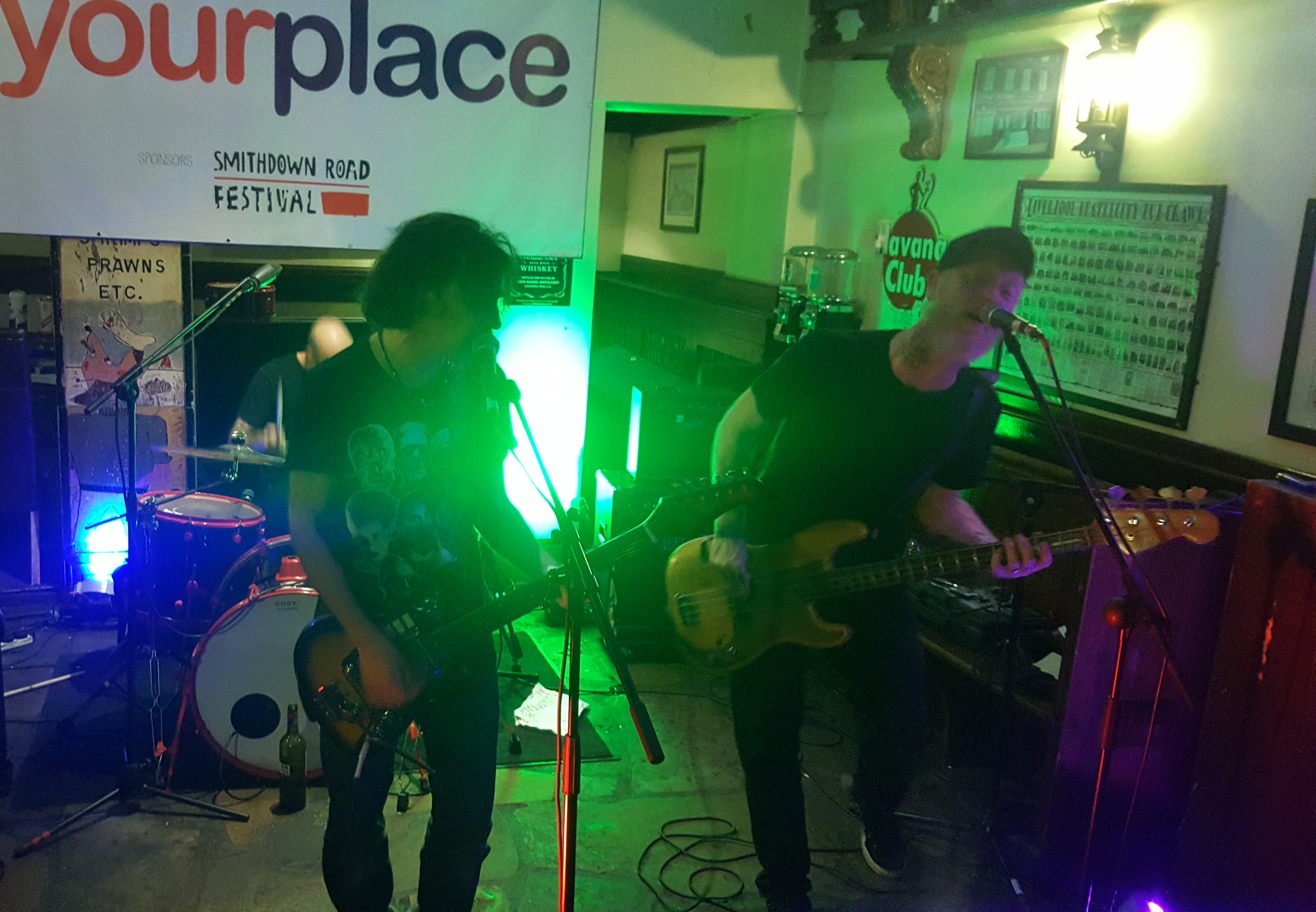
Three members of Space play a "secret gig" in Liverpool, 13 October 2018

In November 2015, Space released the single "Strange World" as a stopgap between albums. In 2016, the band announced that they were working on a new album entitled Give Me Your Future, recorded with Steve Levine.

In November 2019, a box set entitled The Anthology was released, containing the band's first five studio albums, including the previously unreleased Love You More than Football album, plus B-sides and rarities.

On 27 August 2021, Space released "Hell No", the first single from their seventh album Music for Pleasure Music for Pain which was first made available during a meet and greet at Wax & Beans Records on 23 October 2021, with general distribution through their label Hug Records' website on 12 December 2022. In 2023, the band embarked on a 25th anniversary tour for Spiders and Tin Planet, playing both albums in their entirety and with Murphy rejoining them for these shows. On November 22, 2024, an updated version of The Anthology boxset, adding Give Me Your Future and Music for Pleasure Music for Pain, was released.

In September 2026, it was announced that Space's eighth album Ten Neurotic Fairytales, featuring cover art by Johnny Vegas, will be released on February 26, 2027 through Townsend Music.

On September 19, 2026, the members of Space were amongst the 280 guests evacuated from The Grand Burstin Hotel in Folkestone when a fire broke out at the hotel in the early hours of the morning.

== Musical style ==
"Space is all about making songs with all the latest technology and throwing every genre of music into the mix to come up with something mad."

— Tommy Scott, summing up Space's approach to Transatlantic Modern in 2020.

Space's sound is noted for its highly eclectic and cinematic nature, which, according to Scouse Pop author Paul Skillen, "challenges convention in an industry that likes to categorize artists into marketable genres". Their embrace of synthesizers and state-of-the-art recording techniques such as looping, sampling, and beats derived from hip hop and dance music helped them stand out from other Liverpool bands of the time, who tended towards more 'traditional' and 'authentic' 1960s-inspired guitar pop.

This also enabled them to sidestep the 'retro-gazing' characteristic of the Britpop movement, which they were frequently associated with. Journalist Jennifer Blake wrote that "Space are from Liverpool, but any attempts to cast the band under the somewhat meaningless title of 'Britpop' should be quickly dismissed. Other than the fact that the members of Space are British and make superb pop music, they have little in common with bands like Blur and Oasis. In fact, they have little in common with any other band. Their quirky originality is what makes them so much fun to watch, leaving the audience not sure what to expect."

Space's lyrics cover a broad range of subjects, frequently referencing celebrities and fictional characters, as well as a recurring interest in science fiction and horror films, which is often reflected in their music videos, live shows, and record sleeves. In an interview with Stuart Maconie, frontman Tommy Scott stated the motivation for his songwriting is inspired more by movies and television rather than other musicians: "I'm into films and telly. The songs I write depends on what film I'm into at the time. Some days I'm Noël Coward, some days I think I'm Quentin Tarantino, some days it's Speedy Gonzales" Scott has described Space's approach to creating music as a democratic process:

"I basically write the song and put in a few bits and bobs and then I take it to the lads. I never tell anyone what to do. They all put their own stuff on it. That is good too. Franny puts on his ’80s influence and techno stuff, Jamie also put his influence on it (he thought he was in Led Zeppelin) and I put in all my influences from horror movies. Different musicians alter the dynamics of the band and having played with different people it changes all the time. When we reformed, we listened back to the Spiders album: it seemed so slow – it was more like trip-hop, so when we got Phil and Allan in, they were more into punk stuff. They gave the music a raw edge and we sounded a bit more rocked-up when we played it live."

Scott claimed it was never the band's intent to write "odd music" and that they "just didn't want to be like every other band". "We went into a practice room with a song; we then recorded it and released it. We didn't know what would happen after that. There was no plan; it was just natural. If Space had been contrived, it would have been rubbish." He also stated that, due to the tongue-in-cheek, campy nature of their lyrics, he would get defensive whenever critics would dismiss them as "quirky" or as a novelty act:

"I used to be called wacky. I used to hate it – but now I just don't care. We were once described as 'queasy listening'. It is because I just do not want to stick to one genre of music. I am into everything so why can't it just all go into one song? Why would you want to do just country or rock? Why can't you just do what you want?"

== Band members ==
=== Current members ===
- Tommy Scott – vocals, guitar, bass guitar (1992–2005, 2011–present)
- Franny Griffiths – keyboards, synthesizers, melodica, sonic manipulations, turntables, samples, backing vocals (1994–2005, 2011–present)
- Phil Hartley – bass guitar, double bass, keyboards, backing vocals, piano, banjo, orchestrations, record producer (2011–present)
- Allan Jones – drums, guitar, backing vocals (2011–present)

=== Touring members ===
- Paul Hemmings – guitar (2016–2020)
- Jorden Owoo - vocals (2019–2024, his death)

=== Former members ===
- Jamie Murphy – lead guitar, vocals (1992–2001, 2011–2012, 2022–2023)
- Jamie Island - drums (1992–1993)
- Andy Parle – drums (1993–1997; died in 2009)
- David "Yorkie" Palmer – bass guitar, keyboards, backing vocals (1996–2005)
- Leon Caffrey – drums (1997–2005)
- Ryan Clarke – keyboards, vocals (2011–2014)

== Discography ==
Space discography
- Studio albums: 7
- Compilation albums: 4
- Singles: 24

=== Studio albums ===
Year	Title	Chart positions				
Year	Title	UK	AUS	FIN	NZ	US
1996	Spiders: Release date: 16 September 1996	5	133	35	45	189
1998	Tin Planet: Release date: 9 March 1998	3	74	—	11	—
2004	Suburban Rock 'n' Roll: Release date: 8 March 2004	—	—	—	—	—
2014	Attack of the Mutant 50ft Kebab: Release date: 17 March 2014	—	—	—	—	—
2017	Give Me Your Future: Release date: 22 December 2017	—	—	—	—	—
2019	Love You More than Football: Release date: 8 November 2019 *Recorded: 2000 (The Anthology boxset)	—	—	—	—	—
2021	Music for Pleasure Music for Pain: Release date: 23 October 2021	—	—	—	—	—
2027	Ten Neurotic Fairytales: Release date: 26 February 2027	—	—	—	—	—
"—" denotes albums that were not released or did not chart

=== Compilation albums ===
- Invasion of the Spiders (collection of all the B-sides and remixes from Spiders) (1997)
- Greatest Hits (2002)
- Music for Aliens (2002–03)
- Greatest Hits & Unheard Bits (2003)
- Greatest Hits: The Collectors Edition (2005)
- Avenging Angels: The Best Of (2009)
- The Anthology... Five Studio Albums B-Sides and Rarities (2019)
- The Anthology... Seven Studio Albums B-Sides and Rarities (2024)

=== Singles ===
Year	Song	UK	AUS	IRE	NZ	US Alt	Album
1993	"If Its Real"	—	—	—	—	—	Non-album single
1995	"Money / Kill Me"	—	—	—	—	—	Spiders
1996	"Neighbourhood"	56	—	—	—	—	Spiders
1996	"Female of the Species"	14	80	—	—	15	Spiders
1996	"Me and You Versus the World"	9	—	—	—	—	Spiders
1996	"Neighbourhood" (re-issue)	11	90	—	22	—	Spiders
1997	"Dark Clouds"	14	228	—	—	—	Spiders
1997	"Avenging Angels"	6	146	—	—	—	Tin Planet
1998	"The Ballad of Tom Jones"	4	46	26	27	—	Tin Planet
1998	"Begin Again"	21	82	—	—	—	Tin Planet
1998	The Bad Days (EP)	20	—	—	—	—	Tin Planet
2000	"Diary of a Wimp"	49	—	—	—	—	Love You More Than Football
2002	"Gravity" (promo single)	—	—	—	—	—	Love You More Than Football
2002	"Zombies"	87	—	—	—	—	Suburban Rock 'n' Roll
2004	"Suburban Rock 'n' Roll"	67	—	—	—	—	Suburban Rock 'n' Roll
2004	"20 Million Miles from Earth"	124	—	—	—	—	Suburban Rock 'n' Roll
2013	"Frightened Horses" (video single)	—	—	—	—	—	Attack of the Mutant 50ft Kebab
2013	"Fortune Teller" (digital download)	—	—	—	—	—	Attack of the Mutant 50ft Kebab
2014	"Fortune Teller" (7" vinyl re-issue)	—	—	—	—	—	Attack of the Mutant 50ft Kebab
2014	"Falling in Love"	—	—	—	—	—	Attack of the Mutant 50ft Kebab
2015	"Strange World"	—	—	—	—	—	Non-album singles
2016	"Blow Up Doll"	—	—	—	—	—	Non-album singles
2017	"Dangerous Day"	—	—	—	—	—	Non-album singles
2018	"Metropolis"	—	—	—	—	—	Give Me Your Future
2021	"Hell No"	—	—	—	—	—	Music for Pleasure Music for Pain
2024	"Blood and Bubblegum"	—	—	—	—	—	Non-album single
"—" denotes singles that were not released or did not chart
