= Franny Griffiths =

English keyboardist (born 1966)

- Franny Griffiths performing with Space at Leestock, 2013

Background information
- Born: Francis Griffiths; 1 July 1966 (age 60); Liverpool, England
- Genres: Alternative rock, electronica, indie rock, techno
- Occupation: Keyboardist
- Instruments: Keyboards, piano, melodica
- Years active: 1994–present
- Label: Antipop Records
- Website: spacetheband.com

Francis Griffiths (born 1 July 1966, Liverpool, England) is a keyboardist, producer and remixer, best known as a member of the band Space. He also plays guitar, melodica and piano. His main influences are Kraftwerk, hip-hop, Can, various electro bands such as The Prodigy and Crass. He is both a dance music fan and enjoyer of heavy rock bands such as Marilyn Manson.

The strange noises produced by Griffiths' piano (contrary to rumours, he does not use a Theremin) are one of the trademarks of Space's sound. Griffiths has performed lead vocals on only one Space track – "I Am Unlike A Lifeform You've Ever Met", a B-side on the "Avenging Angels" single. However, on the first two Space albums, Spiders and Tin Planet, as well as the B-sides of various singles, he has contributed instrumental tracks, and remixes under the moniker Franny Aspirin.

== Biography ==
Griffiths met Space singer Tommy Scott as a teenager, and the two were both members of The Australians and Hello Sunset. Griffiths also used to be in a band called BB And Me. In the late 1980s he left England for Spain, where he worked as a bouncer in Malgrat de Mar, Barcelona, and often went clubbing in Ibiza. On his return to Liverpool, he was handed an empty cigarette packet with Scott's telephone number written on it, and a request to help the nascent Space record a demo. Naturally curious, Griffiths dialled the number. he became the fourth member of Space in 1994.

Along with Scott, Griffiths is one of the two original members in the most recent Space line-up.

Similarly to his bandmates, the stress of touring America in 1997 minus guitarist Jamie Murphy – with whom Griffiths seems to have a love/hate relationship – took its toll on the keyboardist. He came down with a particularly nasty case of stomach ulcers, as well as succumbing to tonsillitis on Space's second US tour with Murphy. On one of the American tours in 1997, Griffiths and his bandmates visited Mike Myers' house after 'Female of the Species' featured in Austin Powers: International Man of Mystery.

After Space split in 2005, Griffiths made R'n'B music under the name Subway Showdown. He also played alongside Murphy in Dust, before Space's reunion in 2011. Outside Space, he has remixed other bands.

== Equipment ==
Griffiths has used the following synths when touring and recording with Space:

- Access Virus TI
- Roland A-37
- Roland JP-8000
- Roland Juno-60
- Various Moog synths
- Novation Nocturn

== Personal life ==
Griffiths lives with his partner Karen – who has performed backing vocals on some of Space's songs, including a remix of "Neighbourhood" titled "Welcome To The Neighbourhood"– and their two sons, Christian and Ellis.

He supports Liverpool F.C. As a survivor of the Hillsborough Disaster, he is also a long-time supporter of the Hillsborough Justice Campaign.
