= Tommy Scott (English musician) =

English musician (born 1964)

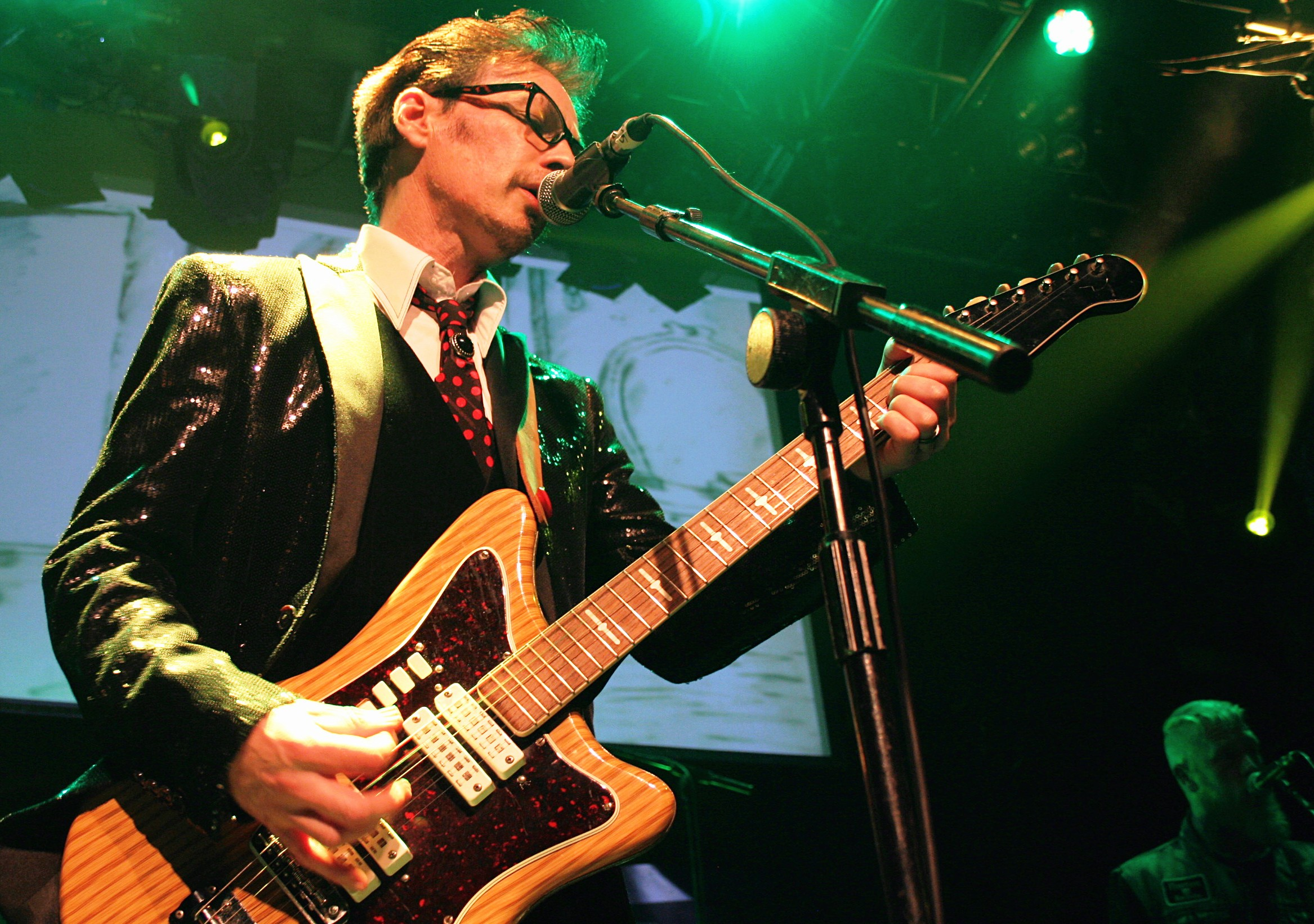
- Tommy Scott performing with Space at Islington Academy, 23 March 2014 (pic: Kris Griffiths)

Background information
- Born: Thomas Scott; 18 February 1964 (age 62); Liverpool, England
- Occupations: Singer, songwriter
- Instruments: Guitar, bass guitar
- Years active: 1984–present
- Label: Antipop Records
- Website: spacetheband.com

Thomas Scott (born 18 February 1964) is an English musician and the lead singer, principal songwriter and guitarist of the Liverpool band Space. He started out as the band's bassist, but switched to guitar after David "Yorkie" Palmer joined in 1997, partly so that he could concentrate on vocals.

Before Space, he played in various Liverpool bands, such as the Substitutes (with Jamie Murphy), Hello Sunset and the Australians (with Franny Griffiths, who later became Space's keyboardist).

== Biography ==
Scott was born in Everton, Liverpool and grew up on the Cantril Farm Estate, now Stockbridge Village. Scott's father, a former Ford factory worker, died of cancer in 1995, an event which would later inspire "Avenging Angels". Scott grew up with a love of films, rock and roll and punk, all of which has informed his writing.

Around the early 1980s, Scott enrolled on a Youth Training Scheme course for unemployed musicians in Northern England, alongside Mike Badger, John Power and Lee Mavers, all of whom would later become members of The La's. In 1984, Scott formed his first group, Hello Sunset, whose lineup included keyboard player Franny Griffiths. Due to an entanglement with local gangsters who acted as their management, by 1987, Hello Sunset had morphed into The Australians, and their songs "Sadie" and "The Girl Who Loved Her Man Enough Too Kill Him" were included on the Vinyl Virgins and Hit the North compilations, respectively.

In 1993, Scott formed Space with Jamie Murphy and Andy Parle in 1993, with Griffiths joining a year later. When the band toured the United States for the first time in 1997, Scott lost his voice for two months due to stress, and the band subsequently had to cancel their tour. Scott stated that after trying numerous kinds of therapies and cures, he saw a psychic, Billy Roberts, who was able to predict the exact date his voice would come back.

Space split in 2005, and Scott formed the Drellas, the original line-up of which included Space's then drummer Leon Caffrey, and Phil Hartley — who had previously worked with Space as a live technician — on bass. The Drellas then morphed into Tommy Scott & the Red Scare, featuring Scott, Hartley and two new members, Allan Jones (drums) and Ryan Clarke (keyboards), as well as a saxophone player. Hartley, Jones and Clarke would all later join the new line-up of Space, when the band reformed in 2011, following the death of Andy Parle two years earlier. Both Scott and Murphy admitted to having fallen out with each other, but were on amicable terms by the time the band reunited.

== Influences ==
Although Scott cites films and cartoons such as Speedy Gonzales as his main influences, musically his influences include Cypress Hill, Frank Sinatra, Elvis Presley – as referenced in 'A Liddle Biddy Help From Elvis', from Tin Planet – and the Slits. As a teenager, he frequented Eric's and saw several bands which later influenced him, such as the Au Pairs and Spizz Energi.

== Equipment ==
Scott has used the following equipment:

- Framus bass
- Vox Teardrop bass
- Fender Coronado guitar
- 1972 Tiesco guitar
- 1969 Audition Sunburst guitar
- 1976 Starway Sunburst guitar
- Farida GNA-80 guitar
- 1965 EKO 500/4V guitar
- Vox AC30 amplifier
- Fender Pro Reverb amplifier
- Echoman Delay pedal
- Ibanez Tube Screamer pedal
- VHT Combo amplifier
- Danelectro Tape Echo pedal

== Personal life ==
Scott is married and has a daughter.
