= Gut Records =

1991–2008 British independent record label

- Parent company: Phoenix Music International
- Founded: 1991; 35 years ago
- Founder: Guy Holmes
- Distributors: The Orchard, Sony Music
- Genre: Pop, dance-pop, R&B, indie rock
- Country of origin: United Kingdom
- Location: Maida Vale, London

Gut Records was a British independent record label, based in Maida Vale in London, England.

Formed in 1991, Gut was founded by Guy Holmes, who had been Head of Promotions at Island Records. The first single released on the label, Right Said Fred's song "I'm Too Sexy", became a worldwide hit.

In August 2008, the company's assets were sold to Phoenix Music International Ltd.

== Artists ==
- Aswad (signed under the Bubblin' imprint)
- Sarah Cracknell
- Crazy Frog (UK-only deal, released on the Gusto and Tug imprints)
- The Dualers
- The Egg (signed under the Gusto imprint for "Love Don't Let Me Go (Walking Away)" with David Guetta)
- Fightstar (signed under the Institute Recordings imprint)
- Hairy Diamond
- Hi_Tack (signed under the Gusto imprint, recordings licensed from the Netherlands)
- Tom Jones
- The Lisa Marie Experience (signed under the Gusto imprint)
- Pulse
- Puretone (signed under the Gusto imprint, recordings licensed from Australia)
- Right Said Fred (signed under Tug Records)
- Jimmy Somerville
- Space
- Sparks
- Stan (signed under the Hug imprint)
- Supersister
- Tears for Fears (licensed from New Door Records)
- Uniting Nations (signed under the Gusto imprint)

== See also ==
- List of record labels
- List of independent UK record labels
