= Rupi's Dance =

2003 studio album by Ian Anderson

Studio album by Ian Anderson
- Released: 19 August 2003
- Recorded: 2003
- Genre: Progressive rock, folk rock
- Length: 55:50
- Label: RandM Records (UK) & Fuel 2000 (US)
- Producer: Ian Anderson

Ian Anderson chronology
The Secret Language of Birds (2000)	Rupi's Dance (2003)	Ian Anderson Plays the Orchestral Jethro Tull (2005)

Professional ratings
Review scores
Source	Rating
Allmusic	link

Rupi's Dance (2003) is the fourth studio album by Jethro Tull frontman Ian Anderson. The album was released two weeks after Jethro Tull guitarist Martin Barre's solo album Stage Left, and preceded Jethro Tull's album, The Jethro Tull Christmas Album.

Rupi's Dance includes "Birthday Card at Christmas", the opening track to The Jethro Tull Christmas Album, as a bonus track.

== Track listing ==
1. "Calliandra Shade (The Cappuccino Song)" – 5:02
2. "Rupi's Dance" – 3:00
3. "Lost in Crowds" – 5:37
4. "A Raft of Penguins" – 3:34
5. "A Week of Moments" – 4:27
6. "A Hand of Thumbs" – 4:02
7. "Eurology" – 3:14
8. "Old Black Cat" – 3:40
9. "Photo Shop" – 3:20
10. "Pigeon Flying over Berlin Zoo" – 4:18
11. "Griminelli's Lament" – 2:56
12. "Not Ralitsa Vassileva" – 4:45
13. "Two Short Planks" – 4:00
14. "Birthday Card at Christmas" – 3:37 (bonus track)

== Personnel ==
- Ian Anderson – vocals, acoustic guitar, bamboo flute, accordion, bass, percussion
- Ossi Schaller – guitar
- George Kopecsni – guitar
- Laszlo Bencker – piano, Hammond B-3 organ, mellotron, keyboards
- John O'Hara – accordion, keyboards
- Andrew Giddings – keyboards, bass
- David Goodier – stand-up bass, bass guitar
- Leslie Mandoki – drums, percussion
- James Duncan – drums
- The Sturcz String Quartet

Guests:

- Doane Perry – drums on bonus track
- Martin Barre – electric guitar on bonus track
