= Ian Anderson =

British musician (born 1947)

Ian Anderson MBE
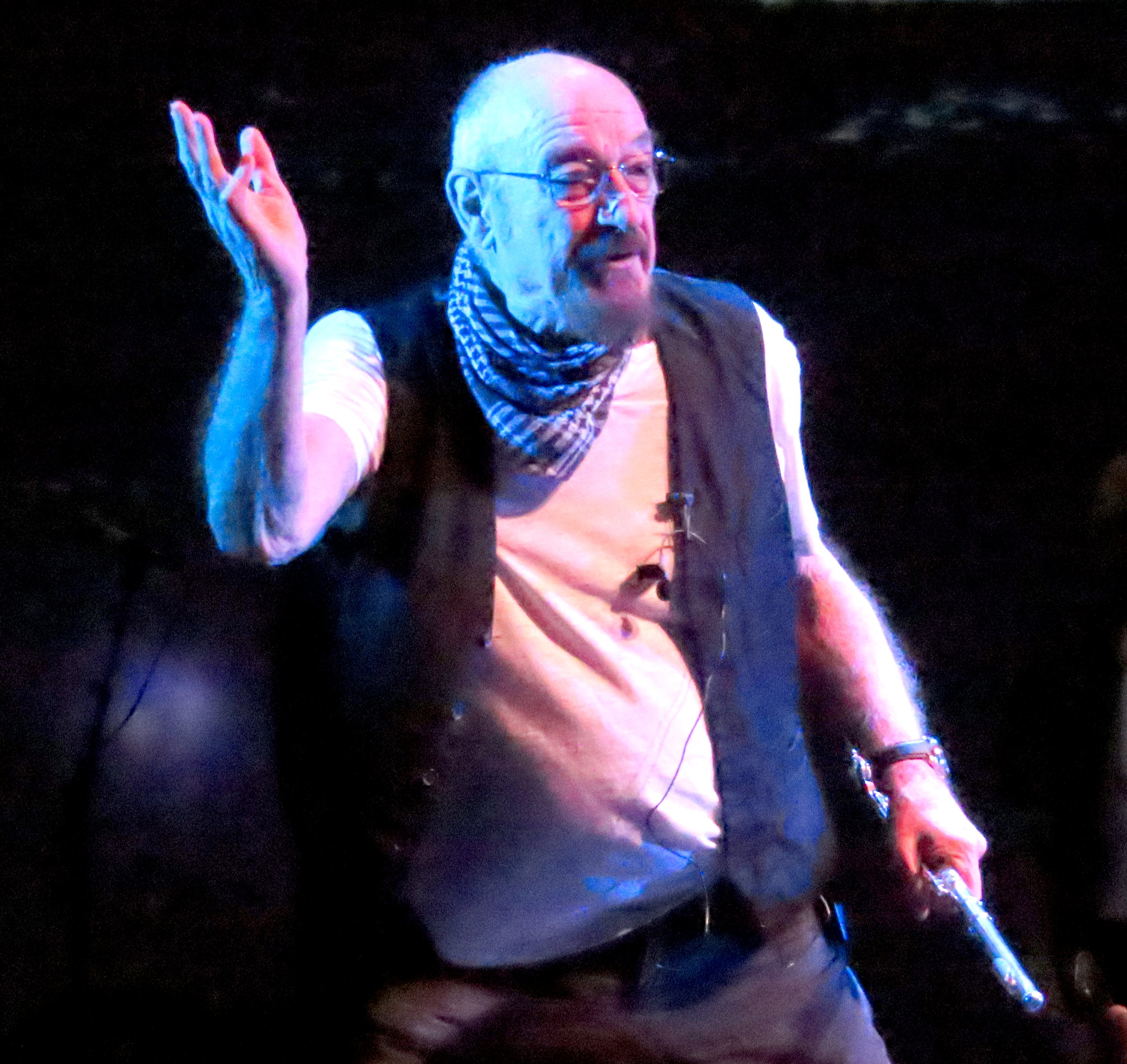
- Anderson performing in 2024

Background information
- Born: Ian Scott Anderson; 10 August 1947 (age 79); Dunfermline, Scotland
- Origin: Blackpool, Lancashire, England
- Genres: Progressive rock; folk rock; hard rock; blues rock
- Occupations: Singer; musician; songwriter; composer
- Instruments: Vocals; flute; guitar
- Years active: 1963–present
- Labels: Chrysalis; Fuel 2000; RandM; Angel; EMI
- Member of: Jethro Tull
- Website: iananderson.com

Ian Scott Anderson MBE (born 10 August 1947) is a British musician best known as the lead vocalist, flautist, and acoustic guitarist of the British rock band Jethro Tull, with whom he has been the only constant member since the band's founding in 1967. A multi-instrumentalist, Anderson also plays harmonica, mandolin, bouzouki, balalaika, saxophone and a variety of whistles.

Born in Dunfermline, Scotland to a Scottish father and English mother, Anderson was raised in Edinburgh before moving to Blackpool, England with his family at age 12. Anderson formed The Blades in 1963 while still in school, a soul and blues band that eventually evolved into Jethro Tull by 1967. Anderson initially played electric guitar, but soon abandoned the instrument in favour of the flute, which would become his signature instrument and a defining component of Jethro Tull's sound. Anderson developed an energetic stage presence, wearing a large overcoat during the band's early years and adopting a signature pose in which he played the flute while standing on one leg. Beginning with Jethro Tull's second studio album, Stand Up (1969), Anderson assumed increasing creative control, becoming the band's primary songwriter and guiding it through a series of stylistic shifts throughout its history, including into the progressive rock that the band would become known for.

Anderson began a solo career in 1983 with Walk Into Light and later released several follow-up albums, including Divinities: Twelve Dances with God (1995), The Secret Language of Birds (2000), Rupi's Dance (2003), Thick as a Brick 2 (2012) and Homo Erraticus (2014). Outside music, Anderson owned several salmon farms from the 1980s to the early 2000s. He was appointed Member of the Order of the British Empire in 2008 for services to music.

== Early life ==
Ian Anderson was born in Dunfermline, Fife, Scotland, the youngest of three brothers, to an English mother and a Scottish father. Anderson said, "I'm a Brit. I see myself as a product of that union." His father, James Anderson, ran the RSA Boiler Fluid Company in East Port, Dunfermline. Anderson's family moved to Edinburgh when he was three. He was influenced by his father's big band and jazz records and the emergence of rock music, but was disenchanted with the "showbiz" style of early American rock and roll stars like Elvis Presley.

Anderson's family moved in 1959 to Blackpool, England, where he was educated at Blackpool Grammar School. In a 2011 interview, Anderson said he was asked to leave grammar school for refusing to submit to corporal punishment (permitted at that time). He studied fine art at Blackpool College of Art from 1964 to 1966 while living in Lytham St Annes.

== Career ==
=== Early career ===
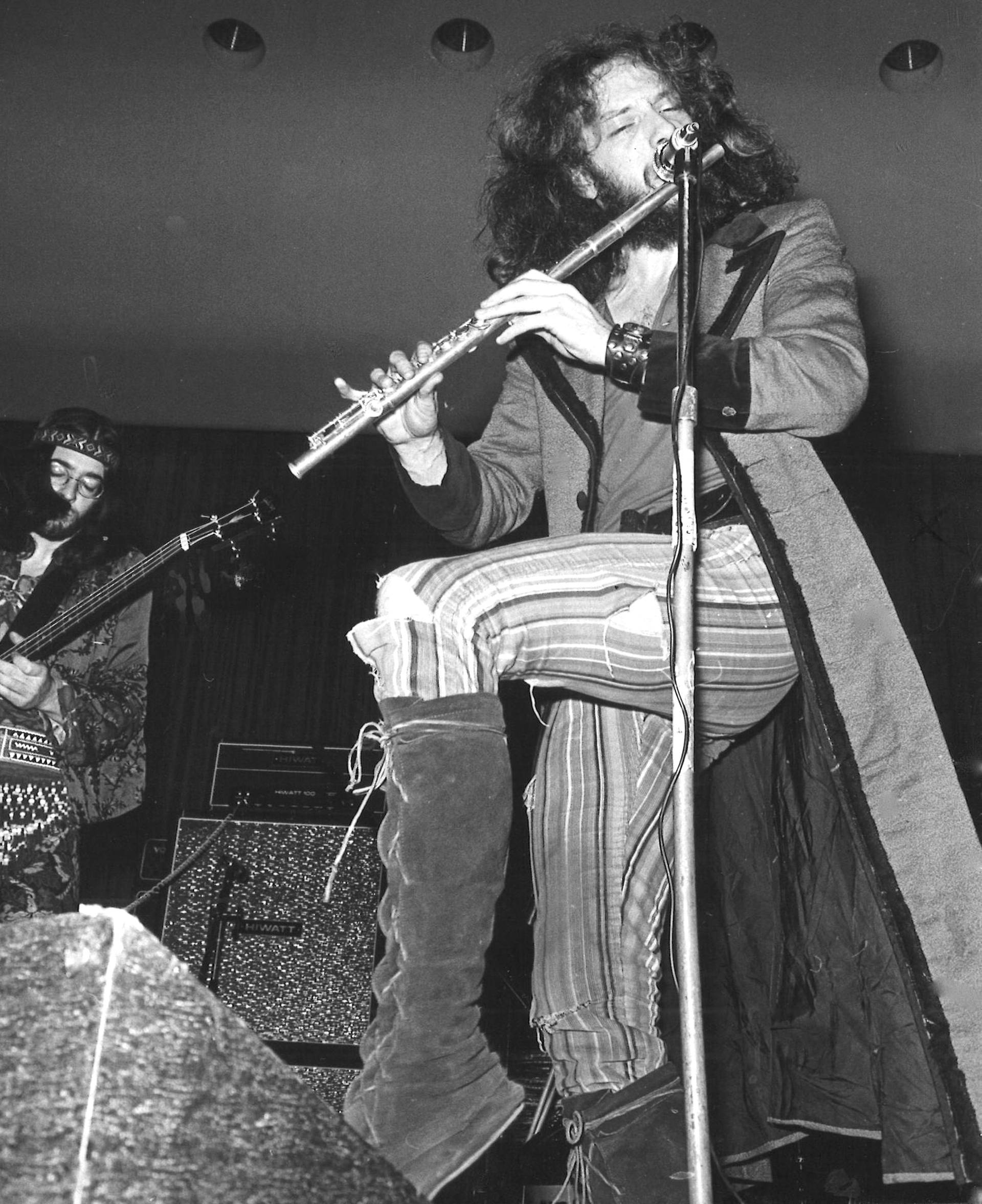
Anderson and Cornick (far left) performing with Jethro Tull in Helsinki, 19 January 1970

While a teenager, Anderson took jobs as a sales assistant at Lewis's department store in Blackpool and as a vendor on a news stand.

In 1963, at 15 or 16 years of age, Anderson formed The Blades from among school friends: Michael Stephens (guitar), John Evan (keyboards), Jeffrey Hammond (bass) and Barriemore Barlow (drums). This was a soul and blues band, with Anderson on vocals, guitar and harmonica; he had yet to take up the flute. They played their first show at the Holy Family Church Hall in North Shore.

In late 1967, Anderson was still holding down a day job cleaning the Ritz Cinema in Luton, including the toilets, in the mornings, "which took me half the day" he said in a later interview. He took an old, chipped urinal from the cinema storeroom and had it for a time after leaving the job. It was not, however, the urinal which "was bolted to the side of John Evan's Hammond organ on stage" and figured in early 1970s Tull performances.

At this time, Anderson abandoned his ambition to play electric guitar. This was allegedly because he felt he would never be "as good as Eric Clapton". As he himself tells it in the introduction to the video Nothing Is Easy: Live at the Isle of Wight 1970, he traded his electric guitar in for a flute which, after some weeks of practice, he found he could play fairly well in a rock and blues style. Anderson later explained that he felt he could more easily make his mark in the music world with an uncommonly used instrument than he could with the guitar, and the easy portability of the flute when traveling to live venues made it an appealing option. According to the sleeve notes for the first Tull album, This Was (1968), he had been playing the flute only a few months when the album was recorded. His guitar practice did not go to waste either, as he continued to play acoustic guitar, using it as a melodic and rhythmic instrument. As his career progressed, he added soprano saxophone, mandolin, keyboards and other instruments.

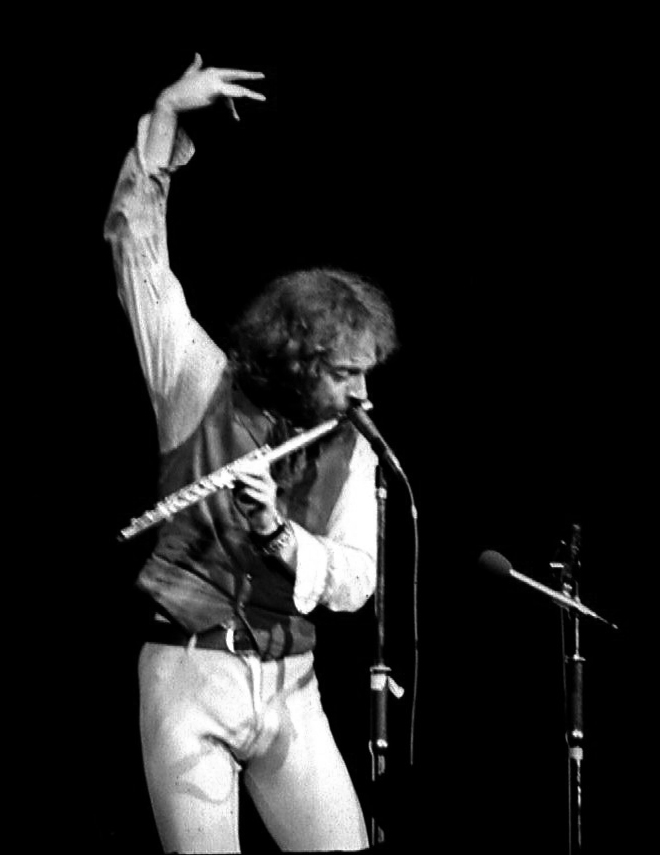
Anderson performing with Jethro Tull, Maple Leaf Gardens, Toronto, Ontario, Canada 24 March 1977

His tendency to stand on one leg while playing the flute came about by accident, as he had been inclined to stand on one leg while playing the harmonica, holding the microphone stand for balance. Anderson became known for his famous one-legged flute stance, and was once referred to as a "deranged flamingo". This stance is depicted on several Jethro Tull album covers. During a long stint at the Marquee Club, a journalist described him, wrongly, as standing on one leg to play the flute, when in fact he was originally playing the harmonica on one leg. He decided to live up to the reputation, albeit with some difficulty. His early attempts are visible in The Rolling Stones Rock and Roll Circus (1968) film appearance of Jethro Tull. This was referenced in the facetious liner notes for Thick as a Brick in a quote about "the one-legged pop flautist, Ian Anderson".

=== Later career ===
Anderson had already wished to start a solo career in 1980, when Jethro Tull was going to take a break after John Glascock's death. He wrote the album A as a solo record, but had Jethro Tull's Martin Barre participating, and Dave Pegg on bass. Record company pressure forced the record to be released under the Jethro Tull name. His first official solo album was Walk into Light, in 1983, in which Peter-John Vettese played an important role in the electronic direction of the music.

In the 1990s, he began working with simple bamboo flutes. He used techniques such as over-blowing and hole-shading to produce note-slurring and other expressive techniques. Anderson said that around this time his daughter began taking flute lessons and noticed that his fingering was incorrect, prompting him to relearn his extensive catalogue with the right fingering. In 1995, Anderson released his second solo album, Divinities: Twelve Dances with God, an instrumental work composed of twelve flute-heavy pieces pursuing varied themes with an underlying motif. The album was recorded with Jethro Tull keyboard player Andrew Giddings and orchestral musicians. Anderson released two further song-based solo albums, The Secret Language of Birds in 2000 and Rupi's Dance in 2003. In 2003, Anderson recorded a composition called "Griminelli's Lament", in honour of his friend, the Italian flutist Andrea Griminelli.

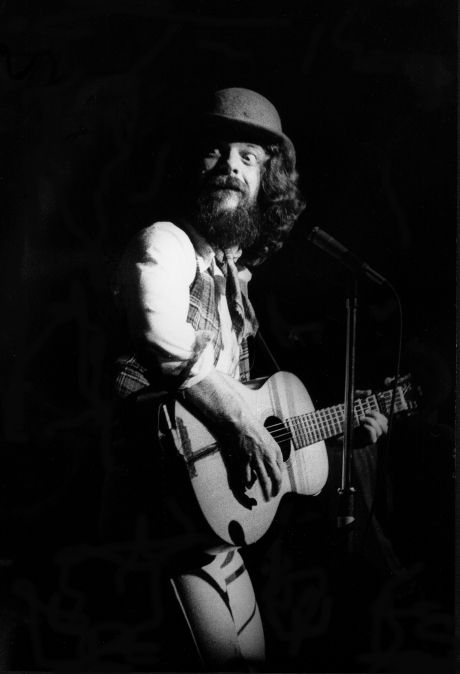
Anderson with Jethro Tull at London's Hammersmith Odeon, March 1978

In 2011, with the end of Jethro Tull touring, and a question asked by his friend Derek Shulman, "What ever happened to Gerald Bostock?", Anderson began to produce a sequel to Thick as a Brick (1972), titled Thick as a Brick 2 or TAAB2, released on 3 April 2012. It was billed as being performed by Jethro Tull's Ian Anderson instead of being a Jethro Tull album proper. Anderson toured, performing both albums in their entirety. A trailer for TAAB2 was posted on YouTube.

Anderson released a new album, Homo Erraticus, in May 2014. He described it as a progressive rock concept album blending rock, folk, and metal music. Peaking at No. 14 in the UK Albums Chart it is his most successful ever solo album.

In September 2017, Anderson announced plans for a tour to commemorate the fiftieth anniversary of This Was, and a new studio album in 2019. The band line-up included Anderson, Hammond, John O'Hara, David Goodier (all musicians of Anderson's solo band since 2012), and, since 2019, Joe Parrish, with Barre and Florian Opahle absent from the lineup.

On 2 January 2018, Ian Anderson published a New Year post on jethrotull.com, including a picture of Anderson with the caption "IA in the studio working on a new album for release March 2019. Shhhh; keep it a secret..."

On 1 June 2018, Parlophone Records released a new (50-track) career collection named 50 for 50 celebrating the Jethro Tull's 50th anniversary and featuring all 21 Tull albums. In the notes of the 50 for 50 booklet it is stated that the new album scheduled for 2019 (and later pushed back to 2020, then 2022) would be a solo record by Ian Anderson and not a new album by Jethro Tull. That turned out not to be true; the band released The Zealot Gene, the first Jethro Tull studio album in 19 years (and the first with all new, original material in 23 years), on 28 January 2022.

== Recognition ==
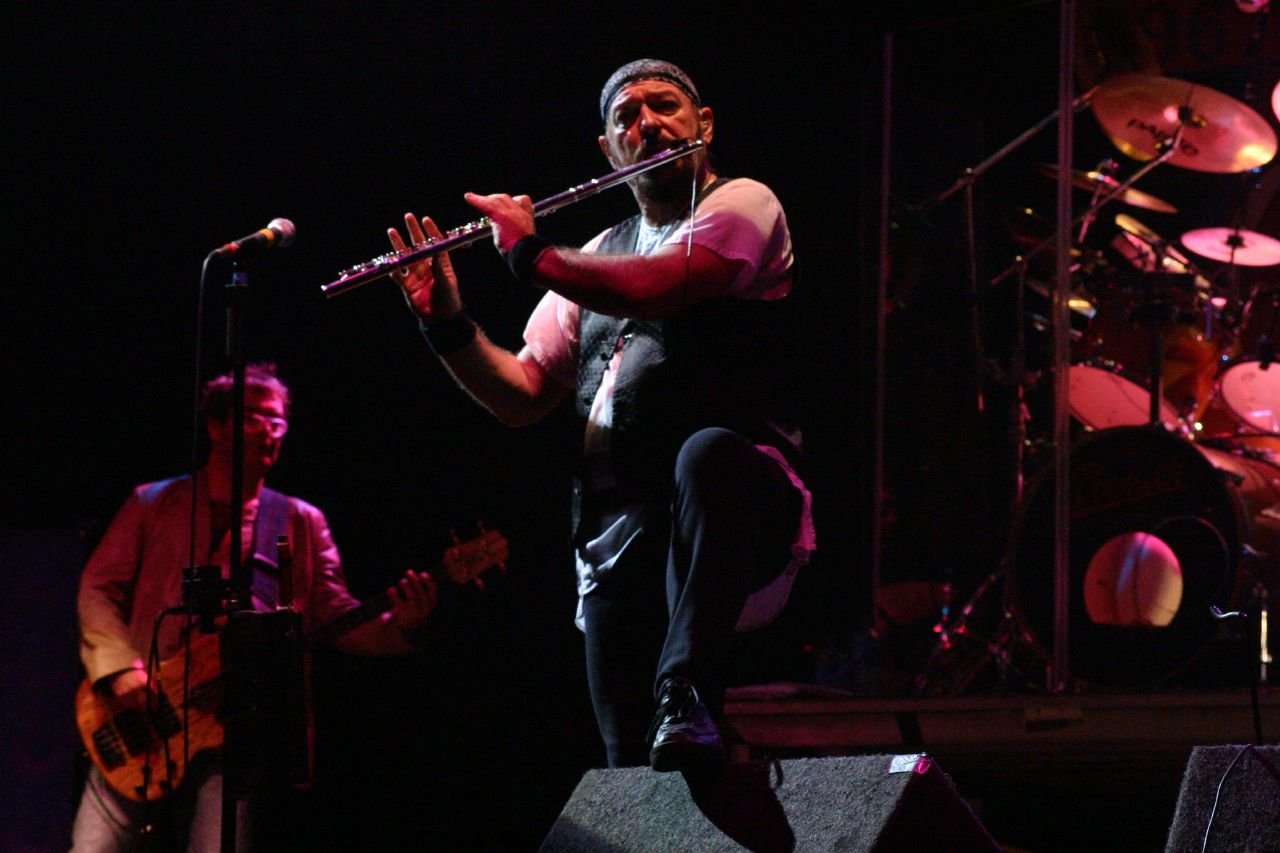
Anderson at the 2004 Cropredy Festival

In 1973, Anderson appeared, along with several other artists, on the cover of Time, for an article about new directions in early 1970s music.

Anderson received two honours in 2006: the Ivor Novello Award for International Achievement and an honorary doctorate from Heriot-Watt University, in July.

Anderson was appointed Member of the Order of the British Empire (MBE) in the 2008 New Year Honours for services to music.

He was awarded an honorary doctorate from Abertay University in July 2011.

At the 2013 Progressive Music Awards, Anderson was presented with the "Prog God" award.

In 2026, Loudwire ranked him as the 9th greatest progressive rock singer of all time.

== Musical collaborations and other work ==
Anderson produced Steeleye Span's 1974 album Now We Are Six, as well as appearing on and producing Steeleye Span member Maddy Prior's first solo album Woman in the Wings (1978), for which Jethro Tull made most instrumental contributions.

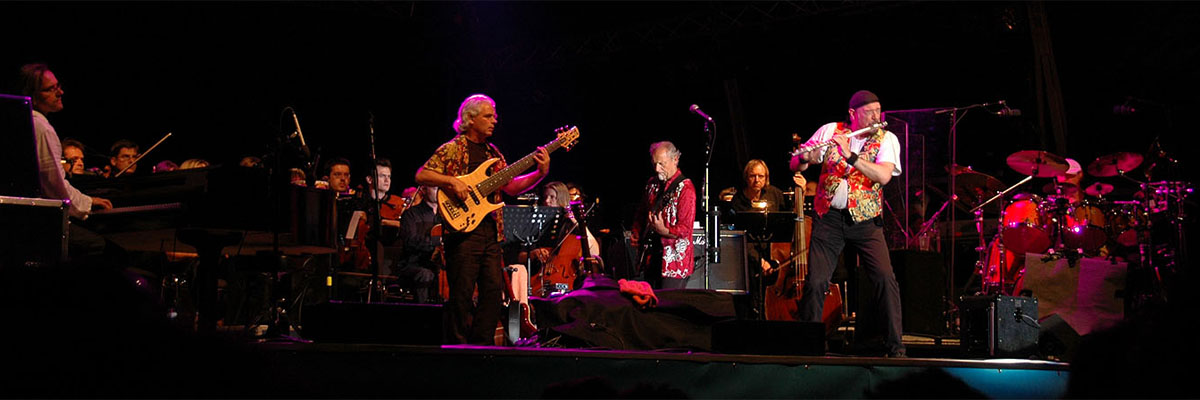
Ian Anderson plays the Orchestral Jethro Tull – in Butzbach (Germany) 6 June 2007.

Anderson appeared as a guest on the song "All Along You Knew" from The Big Prize (1985), the second album by Canadian rock band Honeymoon Suite. This followed Jethro Tull's 1984 tour, on which Honeymoon Suite was one of the opening acts. Also in 1984, Anderson, along with Martin Barre, Dave Pegg and Peter-John Vettese recorded album A Classic Case with the London Symphony Orchestra, performing a selection of music from Jethro Tull. He was also a DJ on radio station Planet Rock, presenting his own two-hour show Under the Influence. He also appeared on stage with Joe Bonamassa playing Jethro Tull song "A New Day Yesterday" at the Hammersmith Apollo in May 2010.

Anderson plays flute on the Men Without Hats song "On Tuesday" from their album Pop Goes the World (1987), and on the Blackmore's Night song "Play, Minstrel, Play" from their debut album Shadow of the Moon (1997).

Anderson plays flute on the 1998 Roy Harper album The Dream Society. Anderson has acknowledged Harper as having a strong influence upon him.

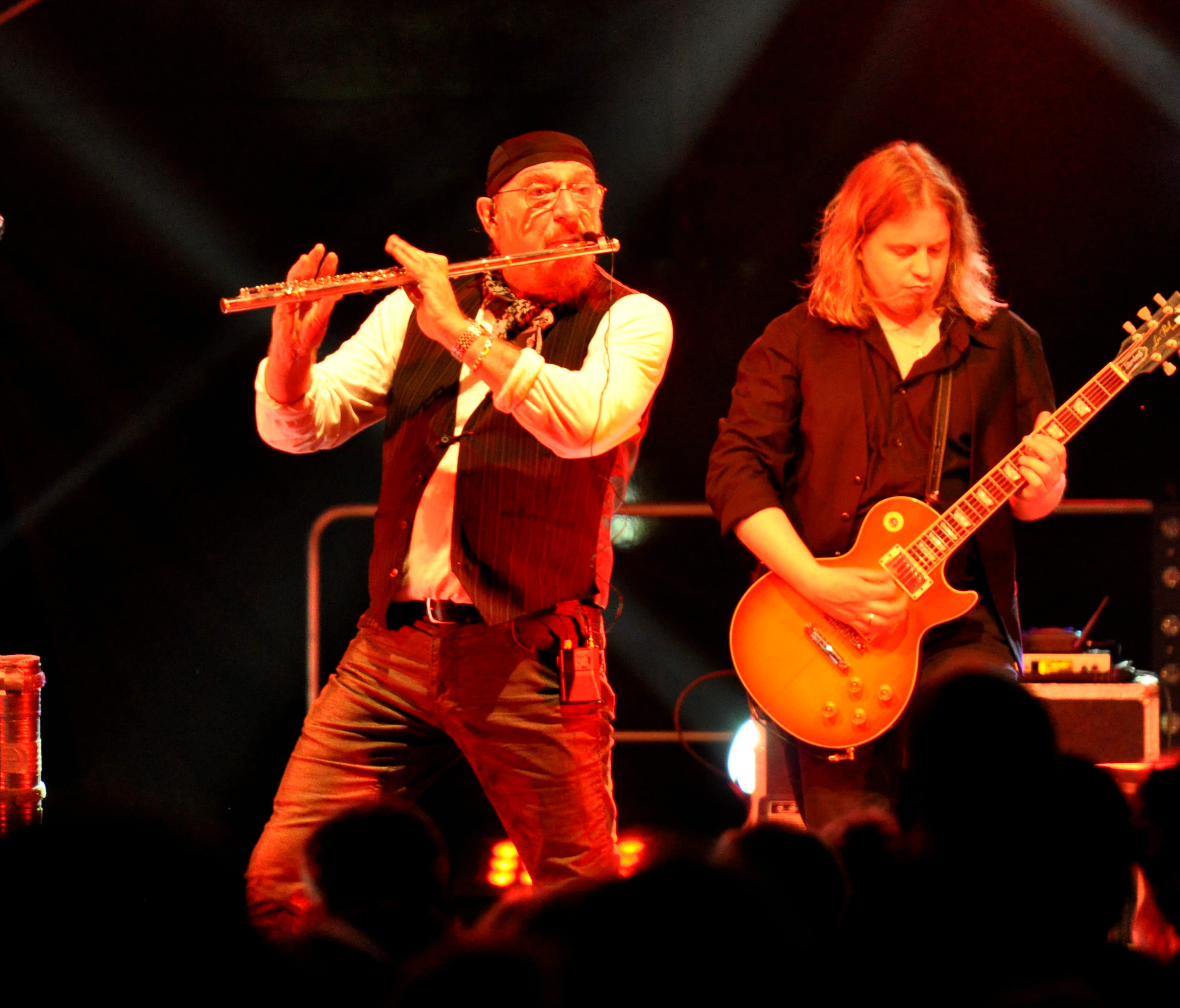
Anderson performing in 2016 at the Blacksheep Festival in Germany

Anderson performs as a special guest on two Uriah Heep live albums: Acoustically Driven (2001) and Electrically Driven (2001), on both performing the same two songs of Uriah Heep repertoire: "Circus" and "Blind Eye".

Anderson plays flute on the track "Portmeirion" on Fairport Convention's 2001 album XXXV. Anderson has performed with Fairport Convention at their annual Cropredy Festival on several occasions since the mid-1980s, when their bass player Dave Pegg was also a member of Jethro Tull.

Anderson played flute and sang lead vocals on a version of "The Thin Ice" for the 2005 album Back Against the Wall, an all-star tribute album covering Pink Floyd's The Wall in its entirety.

In April 2011, Anderson performed a flute duet with astronaut Cady Coleman, during her mission aboard the International Space Station, in honour of the 50th anniversary of the first crewed spaceflight by Yuri Gagarin.

Anderson played the flute on the track "Cannonball" by The Darkness on their 2012 album, Hot Cakes. He played the flute on the track "Cry to the World" by Renaissance on their 2013 album, Grandine il vento. He also played the flute on "The Ocean at the End", the title track from The Tea Party's 2014 album.

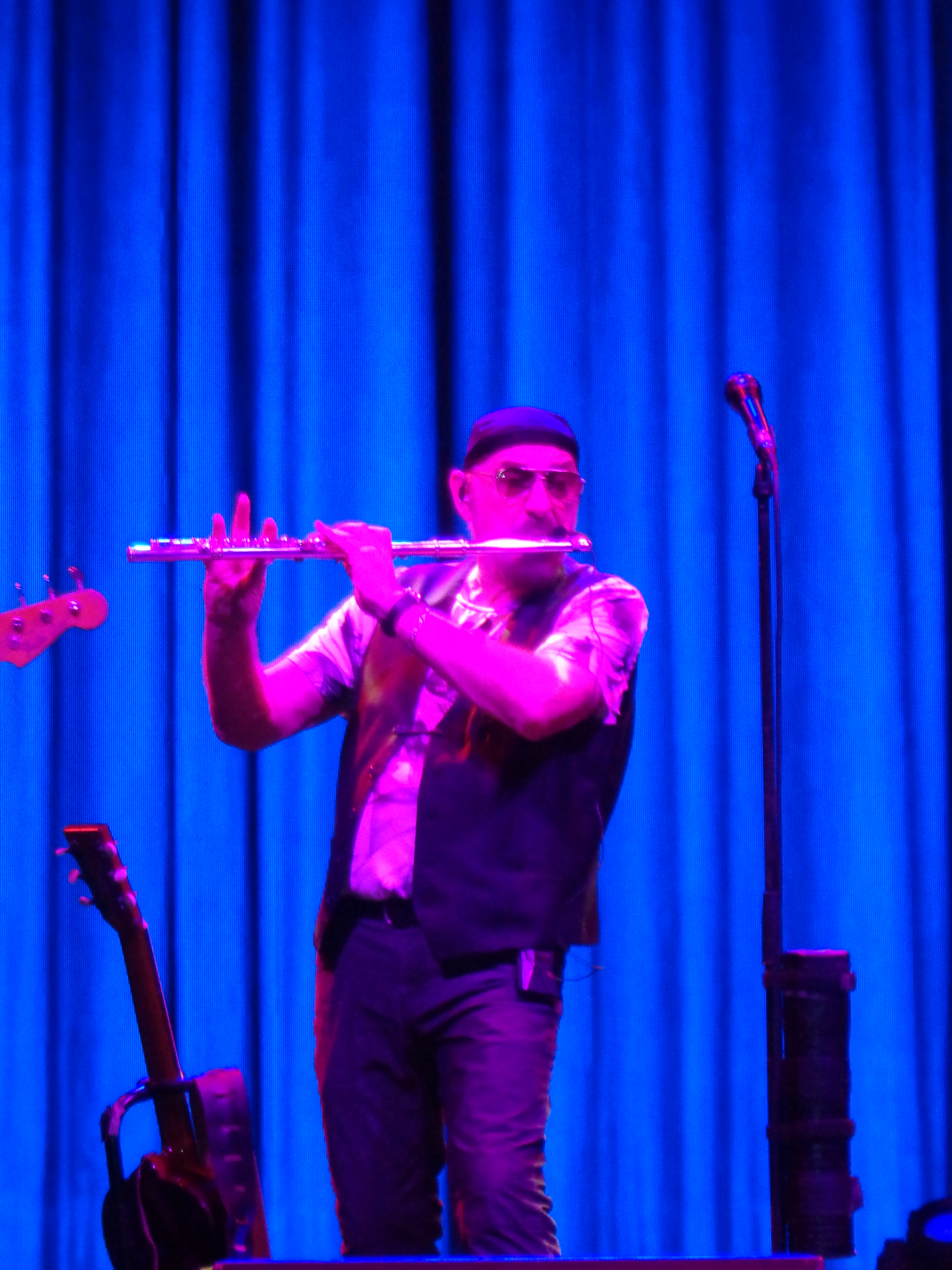
Anderson plays flute in Zagreb, Croatia, on 13 October 2018

Anderson contributed flute on the song "Black Cherry Pie", the third single from JEFF the Brotherhood's 2015 album, Wasted on the Dream.

On 24 March 2017, the studio album Jethro Tull – The String Quartets by Anderson was released, featuring the Carducci String Quartet, conducted by John O'Hara.

The official video for Marc Almond's song 'Lord of Misrule', taken from his 2020 album Chaos and a Dancing Star was released on YouTube on 29 November 2019, featuring Ian Anderson playing flute throughout.

In 2024, Anderson appeared on Swedish progressive rock and metal band Opeth's album The Last Will and Testament. Anderson played flute on tracks "§4", "§7", and "A Story Never Told". Anderson also provided spoken word passages on tracks "§1", "§2", "§4", and "§7".

== Family and personal life ==
Anderson is the youngest of three brothers. The oldest of the three, Robin, became administrator of Scottish Ballet in 1973.

From 1970 to 1974, Anderson was married to Jennie Franks, a photographer who is credited with some of the lyrics to the first couple of verses of the song "Aqualung".

Anderson married Shona Learoyd in 1976, described by Rolling Stone magazine as a "beautiful convent-educated daughter of a wealthy wool manufacturer". She had studied ballet for 10 years. When Anderson met her she was working as a press officer at Jethro Tull's then-record label, Chrysalis Records. She later became involved with the band's on-stage special effects.

For many years the couple lived in a 16th-century redbrick farmhouse on the 500-acre (2.0 km^{2}) Pophleys Estate in Radnage, England, and in Kilmarie House on their Strathaird Estate on the Isle of Skye in Scotland, as well as for a short time in Montreux, Switzerland. They currently live in Wiltshire, England, and have another house in Switzerland, near Montreux. They have two children: James Duncan Anderson, also a musician, and Gael, who works in the film industry and is married to actor Andrew Lincoln, star of the US TV drama series The Walking Dead.

Anderson is a survivor of deep vein thrombosis, and has made several public service announcements to raise awareness of the disease.

Anderson lists his interests as including Indian cuisine, protecting wild cats, especially those that have been rescued from harsh captivity, and cameras, chiefly Leicas.

Anderson has described his religious beliefs as being "somewhere between deist and pantheist". He opposes "prejudice, xenophobia and hard right conservatism", while also criticising "wokeness", calling it a "trendy and overworked" viewpoint that "can all-too-easily stifle the process of the direct exchange of views". He is an avid environmentalist, has long believed in human-induced climate change, and grows hardwood trees on his farm to help reduce his carbon footprint.

During a video interview for The Big Interview with Dan Rather in May 2020, Anderson said he was suffering from the incurable chronic obstructive pulmonary disease (COPD) after being diagnosed a number of years previously. Although Anderson had been a cigarette and pipe smoker until he quit the habit in the 1990s, he believed that a likely cause of this condition was the use of on-stage smoke machines in live performances throughout his career. Anderson continued medication to treat the condition, avoided areas of high pollution to prevent exacerbation of the disease, and practised breathing exercises to keep his lungs fit, stating that COPD had otherwise not yet affected his day-to-day routine.

== Other business activities ==
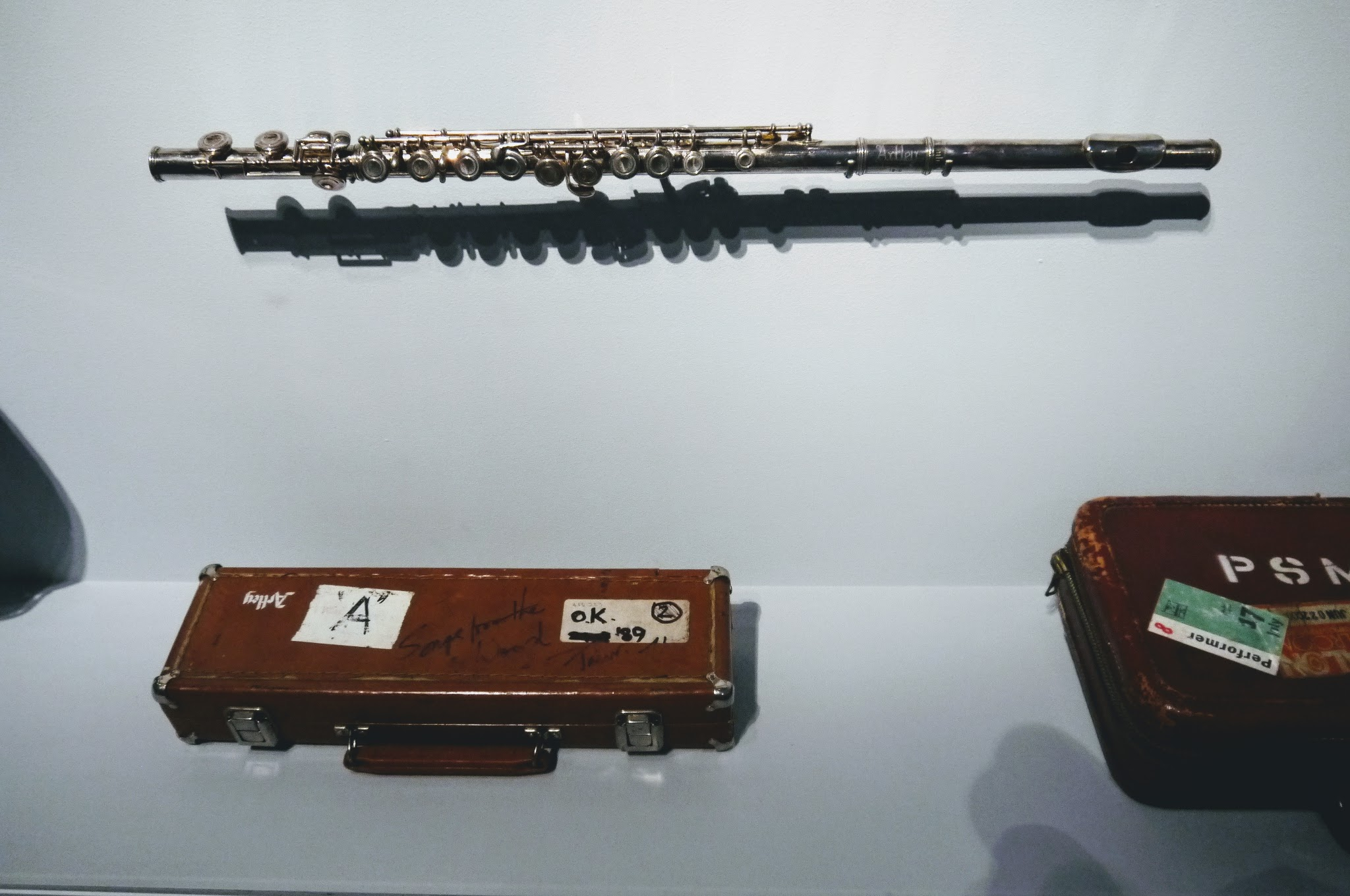
Flute that Anderson used to play live

Anderson has owned several salmon farms in the UK and Chile. His Strathaird concern, based on his estate on the Isle of Skye, operated until the late 1990s, when parts of it were sold off.

Anderson is a director of four companies: Jethro Tull Production Limited, Calliandra Productions Limited, Ian Anderson Limited, and the Ian Anderson Group of Companies Limited.

== Solo discography ==
=== Studio albums ===
Year	Name	Label	Peak chart position		
Year	Name	Label	US	UK	GER
1983	Walk into Light	Chrysalis/EMI Records	202	78	
1995	Divinities: Twelve Dances with God	Angel/EMI Records			
2000	The Secret Language of Birds	Fuel 2000/Varèse Sarabande/Universal Records	26		
2003	Rupi's Dance	RandM Records			40
2012	Thick as a Brick 2	Chrysalis/EMI Records	55	35	13
2014	Homo Erraticus	Kscope	111	14	13

=== Live albums ===
Year	Name	Label	Peak chart position		
Year	Name	Label	US	UK	GER
2005	Ian Anderson Plays the Orchestral Jethro Tull	ZYX Music			68 (CD); 3 (DVD)
2014	Thick as a Brick – Live in Iceland	Eagle Rock			22

=== Collaboration ===
- Jethro Tull – The String Quartets (BMG, 2017) with the Carducci String Quartet

As guest

- Roy Harper: Flashes From The Archives Of Oblivion (Harvest Records, 1974); Anderson plays flute on "Home"
- Honeymoon Suite: The Big Prize (Warner Music Canada, 1986); Anderson plays flute on "All Along You Knew"
- Men Without Hats: Pop Goes the World (Mercury Records, 1987); Anderson plays flute on the track "On Tuesday"
- The Six and Violence: Lettuce Prey (Fist Records, 1990); Anderson plays on "Bursting Bladder" and "Theological Guns"
- Mandoki Soulmates: People ( Red-Rock Production, 1993); Anderson sings and plays flute on "Mother Europe"
- Blackmore's Night: Shadow of the Moon (Edel, 1997); Anderson plays flute on "Play Minstrel Play"
- Roy Harper: The Dream Society (Science Friction Records, 1998); Anderson plays flute on "These Fifty Years"
- Uriah Heep: Acoustically Driven (Classic Rock Productions, 2001); Anderson plays flute on "Circus" and "Blind Eye"
- James Taylor Quartet: Room at the Top (Sanctuary Records, 2002); Anderson plays flute on "Free"
- Magellan: Hundred Year Flood (Magna Carta Records, 2002); Anderson plays flute on "Family Jewels"
- Silverwood Quartet: The Classic Rock Album (2005); Anderson plays flute on "Bourrée"
- Billy Sherwood: Back Against the Wall (Cleopatra Records, 2005); Anderson plays flute and sings lead vocals on "The Thin Ice" and plays flute on "Is There Anybody Out There?"
- Toto: Falling in Between (2006); Anderson plays flute on "Hooked"
- Various Artists: Asia and Progressive Rock Friends (2008); Anderson sings and plays flute on "The Thin Ice"
- Eric Brooke: The Road to Here (2011); Anderson plays flute on "O.K.(Live) "
- Saori Jo: Home 2.17 AM (2012); Anderson plays flute on "Fairy World"
- Unnur Birna: Sunshine (2013); Anderson plays flute on "Sunshine"
- Anna Phoebe: Between the Shadow and the Soul (2014); Anderson plays flute on "A Moment's Deception"
- Boris Grebenshchikov: Salt (2014); Anderson plays flute on "Любовь во время войны"
- Renaissance: Symphony of Light (2014); Anderson plays flute on "Cry to the World"
- Tiles: Pretending 2 Run (Laser's Edge, 2016); Anderson plays flute on "Midwinter"
- Helen Andrews: Circling Highs, Unravelling Lows (2016); Anderson plays flute on "Behind the Glass"
- John Cooper Clarke & Hugh Cornwell: This Time It's Personal (2016); Anderson plays flute on "MacArthur Park"
- Tim Bowness: Lost in the Ghost Light (2017); Anderson plays flute on "Distant Summers"
- Tinkara: Cuori di ossigeno (2017); Anderson plays flute on "Maldamore"
- Steeleye Span: Est'd 1969 (2019); Anderson plays flute on "Old Matron"
- Heather Findlay: Wild White Horses (2019); Anderson plays flute on "Winner"
- Mandoki Soulmates: Living in the Gap + Hungarian Pictures (2020); Anderson sings and plays flute on "Let the Music Show You the Way"
- Louise Patricia Crane: Deep Blue (Peculiar Doll Records, 2020); Anderson plays flute on "Snake Oil" and "Ophelia"
- Steve Bailey: Carolina (2020); Anderson plays flute on "Bourrée"
- Robby Steinhardt: Not In Kansas Anymore / A Prog Opera (2021); Anderson plays flute and pennywhistle on "Pizzacato (A Slice For Baby Boy Flynn)"
- Opeth: The Last Will and Testament (2024); Anderson plays flute on "§4", "§7" and "A Story Never Told". Anderson also provides spoken words on "§1", "§2", "§4", and "§7".
