= The Minks =

American rock band

The Minks are a four piece American rock band from Nashville, Tennessee led by frontwoman Nikki Barber. Guitar Girl magazine describes the band as “hover[ing] in the space of psyche-blues and pure rock with Barber’s vocals being compared to Patti Smith and Bonnie Raitt.”

The Minks released their first full-length album, Light & Sweet, on September 20, 2019 via Café Rooster Records. On March 3, 2023, they self-released their second full-length album, Creatures of Culture.

== Overview ==
Nikki Barber formed The Minks in 2015, after moving to Nashville from Gettysburg, Pennsylvania. Barber recruited longtime friend and former bandmate from the rock-duo Static Trees, Dylan Whitlow (bass), now with DeeOhGee, as well as Ron Gallo (guitar) to form The Minks.

Prior to moving to Nashville, Nikki earned a Bachelor of Fine Arts in Fashion Design at the Academy of Art University and released her own fashion line called Nikki Stitch. The Minks have performed with artists such JD McPherson, Lilly Hiatt, Aaron Lee Tasjan, Liz Cooper & The Stampede, JEFF the Brotherhood and Okey Dokey.

== Discography ==
Title	Album details
Sweet Talk (EP)	Release date: April 15, 2016 Label: The Minks
Light & Sweet (LP)	Release date: September 20, 2019 Label: Café Rooster Records
Creatures of Culture (LP)	Release date: March 3, 2023 Label: The Minks

== Members ==
Current Members

- Nikki Barber - Vocals, guitar
- Dylan Sevey – Drums, vocals
- Ben Giesecke - Guitar, vocals
- Henri Young - Bass, vocals
