= The Secret Language of Birds =

2000 album by Ian Anderson

Studio album by Ian Anderson
- Released: 6 March 2000 (UK)
- Recorded: 1998
- Genre: Progressive rock, folk rock
- Length: 59:53
- Label: Fuel 2000
- Producer: Ian Anderson

Ian Anderson chronology
| Divinities: Twelve Dances with God (1995) | The Secret Language of Birds (2000) | Rupi's Dance (2003) |

Professional ratings
Review scores
| Source | Rating |
|---|---|
| Allmusic | link |

The Secret Language of Birds is the third studio album by Jethro Tull frontman Ian Anderson, released in 2000. It is named after the dawn chorus, the natural sound of birds heard at dawn, most noticeably in the spring.

== Track listing ==
1. "The Secret Language of Birds" – 4:17
2. "The Little Flower Girl" – 3:37
3. "Montserrat" – 3:21
4. "Postcard Day" – 5:07
5. "The Water Carrier" – 2:56
6. "Set-Aside" – 1:29
7. "A Better Moon" – 3:46
8. "Sanctuary" – 4:42
9. "The Jasmine Corridor" – 3:54
10. "The Habanero Reel" – 4:01
11. "Panama Freighter" – 3:21
12. "The Secret Language of Birds, PT. II" – 3:06
13. "Boris Dancing" – 3:07
14. "Circular Breathing" – 3:45
15. "The Stormont Shuffle" – 3:20
16. Extra Track Intro (unlisted) – 0:08
17. "In the Grip of Stronger Stuff" (unlisted bonus track on US release. Recorded by Dutch TV for '2 Meter Sessies', 19 October 1999. Broadcast 23 December) – 2:50
18. "Thick as a Brick" (unlisted bonus track on US release. Recorded by Dutch TV for '2 Meter Sessies', 19 October 1999. Broadcast 23 December) – 2:37

== Introductions ==
To each track, Anderson wrote an introduction:

- The Secret Language of Birds: "The big dawn chorus. Morning after a night before. Could turn out to be the special person. Everything's riding on this one."
- The Little Flower Girl: "Sir William Russell Flint's fully clad but coquettish flower girl. Was it his favourite model Cecilia? Just showing up for another day's work. Hats off to one of the greatest technical watercolourists of all time."
- Montserrat: "Been there. Between eruptions. Last gasp of colonial betrayal. Heart goes out. Dwarf Poincianas still growing strong, here at home. Ashfall wasteland where I picked them."
- Postcard Day: "Holiday guilt. Having a simply wonderful time. Wish you were here, but sort of glad you're not."
- The Water Carrier: "H2O at any price. No Delhi Belly. No regrets. No small change left. The best earthenware pots by Sir W.R.F. and Walter Langley. Would they have as lovingly executed the form and colour of the 1.5-litre plastic bottle? Of course."
- Set-Aside: "Pointless and undignified prevarication." See Set-aside
- A Better Moon: "Sultry and sub-tropical images of a Foweraker fantasy five thousand miles from home."
- Sanctuary: "Last haven of zoo rejects and children wasted. Tricky one to try. Made me cry."
- The Jasmine Corridor: "Nice place to say goodbye. Smells good, looks good, was good. Faces east. Always the optimistic light. Nothing ever really ends."
- The Habanero Reel: "On a lighter note, I think quite a few people know that I'm keen on spicy food, particularly those who have visited our website. I use a lot of chilli peppers when I cook at home and the generally accepted number 10 strength killer is the habanero – in the Caribbean a close relative of this is the Scotch Bonnet, which I also refer to in this song. 'The Habanero Reel' is just an ode to capsicum, which gives off that excessive, burning heat. Of course, the best thing about it, as I say in the song, is that it is strictly legal!"
- Panama Freighter: "Lonely Planet guide to traveller's romance. Pragmatism. Cynicism. You take U.S. dollar?"
- The Secret Language of Birds, Pt. II: "Semantic set-aside. You with me?"
- Boris Dancing: "I've always had a soft spot for Boris Yeltsin, I wrote the music to 'Boris Dancing' based on a visual image of a CNN news report from when Boris was seeking re-election. He was filmed in Red Square, sweating profusely, bright red in the face, boogieing frantically in front of a young Moscow rock band. He nearly died from a heart attack just a couple of days later. The song is in several rather difficult to follow time signatures, as when Boris was dancing he wasn't quite on the beat. 'Boris Dancing' is just a celebration of his strange, individual dance style."
- Circular Breathing: "The deep breath that goes on forever. Strangely detached but objective view from a height. Pink Floyd's 'Learning To Fly' meets L.S. Lowry meets Status Quo's 'Pictures of Matchstick Men'. Or not."
- The Stormont Shuffle: "Peace, Love, Misunderstanding. Decommissioning the vipers' tongues. Two part tune: north and south, slippery Sams, moaning Minnies. Doublecross, double talk, double trouble."

== Personnel ==
- Ian Anderson – vocals, flute, acoustic guitar, bouzouki, acoustic bass guitar, mandolin, percussion, piccolo
- Andrew Giddings – accordion, piano, organ, marimba, percussion, electric bass, keyboards, orchestral sounds
- Gerry Conway – drums on "The Secret Language of Birds" and "The Little Flower Girl"
- Darrin Mooney – drums on "Sanctuary" and "The Secret Language of Birds, Pt.II"
- James Duncan Anderson – drums on "Panama Freighter"
- Martin Barre – electric guitar on "Boris Dancing" and "The Water Carrier"

== See also ==
- Circular breathing
- Stormont Castle
- Habanero chile

== Notes ==
- The Little Flower Girl, Senlis is a painting by Sir William Russell Flint.
- The Water Carrier is a painting by Walter Langley.
- "A Better Moon" was inspired by the work of Albert Moulton Foweraker.
- "Montserrat" refers to 18 July 1995 eruption of the Soufriere Hills volcano.
- "Lowry matchstick figures" refers to the work of L. S. Lowry.
- "a Constable sky..." refers to painter John Constable.
- "Rousseau garden" refers to Henri Rousseau.
- US release 7 March 2000.
