= Ralitsa Vassileva =

Bulgarian journalist

- Born: Ralitsa Vassileva; 8 June 1963 (age 62); Sofia, Bulgaria
- Education: University of Sofia, Georgia State University
- Occupations: Journalist, Newsanchor
- Notable credit: CNN World News

Ralitsa B. Vassileva (Bulgarian: Ралица Василева, born 8 June 1963) is a Bulgarian journalist. Currently she is lecturer at Grady College of Journalism and Mass Communication. Previously she was an anchorwoman on CNN television news from 1992 to 2014 and news director at Bulgarian International Television, BIT between 2015 and 2017.

She has covered the Bosnian War, the Arab–Israeli conflict, and many other major international issues. She has interviewed many world leaders and high-profile figures, including Mikhail Gorbachev, Ariel Sharon, Henry Kissinger, and others.

== Career ==
From 1992 to 2014, Vassileva was an anchor for CNN International. Based at the network's global headquarters in Atlanta, she anchored CNN Newsroom, previously known as World Report.

Vassileva anchored coverage of many major international news stories including most recently the Chilean miner rescue, the Iran student protests and Israel's Gaza offensive. In addition to her anchoring duties, Vassileva has reported in the field from places like Moscow, Jerusalem and the United Nations. She has also done long-form documentaries like her half-hour special on the 20th anniversary of the fall of Communism in her native Bulgaria.

Vassileva's long career at CNN began with coverage of the conflicts in the former Yugoslavia, the Middle East, as well as Russia's transition to democracy and the Good Friday Agreement. Vassileva has also anchored CNN's coverage of the UN weapons inspection crisis in Iraq, the September 11 attacks on the United States, the war against terrorism and the ongoing military offensive in Afghanistan.

She has interviewed many notable senior international leaders and public figures such as former U.S. Secretaries of State Henry Kissinger and Madeleine Albright, Pakistani President Pervez Musharraf, former Soviet leader Mikhail Gorbachev, Israeli Prime Minister Benjamin Netanyahu, chief Palestinian negotiator Saeb Erakat, Nigerian President Olusegun Obasanjo, Bulgarian President Petar Stoyanov, business entrepreneurs Ted Turner and Richard Branson, and Sinn Féin leader Gerry Adams.

Vassileva began her career at CNN as anchor of CNN World Report, the world's only forum for international broadcasters to present news from their country before CNN's global audience.

Before joining CNN, Vassileva was an anchor and reporter for Bulgarian Television (BT). She cut her teeth in journalism covering the fall of communism in her native Bulgaria. In this role, she helped develop a post-communist approach to news delivery and soon became the country's second highest-rated anchor.

Neither Vassileva nor CNN has commented publicly on her sudden departure from the network.

== Awards, honours and distinctions ==
In 2001, the American University in Bulgaria awarded Vassileva an honorary Doctorate of Humane Letters for her contributions to journalism.

== Personal life ==
Vassileva was born in Sofia, Bulgaria, and was educated at First English Language School in Sofia and in New Delhi, India. She has an MA in English Language and Literature from Sofia University. She recently acquired an MA in political science from Georgia State University in Atlanta. Vassileva's interest in journalism began after she joined Bulgarian Radio's English language service in 1987 as an English translator and announcer where she would later add reporting to her duties.

== Trivia ==
- Jethro Tull's Ian Anderson wrote and recorded a song called "Not Ralitsa Vassileva", which appeared on his album Rupi's Dance. Vassileva appeared as guest at an Ian Anderson "Rubbing Elbows" performance in Atlanta, Georgia.
- Ralitsa Vassileva appears in the 2006 British film The Queen in a real-life outtake of her anchoring CNN's World News. She says "Britain's Queen Elizabeth will deliver a televised address Friday, the royal family has been accused of not showing enough remorse over Princess Diana's death".
