= Stage Left =

Studio album by Martin Barre
- Released: 4 August 2003
- Studio: Presshouse Studio, Devon, England.
- Genre: Instrumental rock, progressive rock
- Length: 51:06
- Label: RandM Records (UK) & Fuel 2000 (United States)
- Producer: Martin Barre, Mark Tucker

Martin Barre chronology
| The Meeting (1996) | Stage Left (2003) | Away with Words (2013) |

Professional ratings
Review scores
| Source | Rating |
|---|---|
| Allmusic | 3/5 stars |

Stage Left is Martin Barre's studio album, released in 2003. The title is a reference to his hallowed position on the Jethro Tull stage assignment. It was the first album of Martin Barre to be released both in U.K. and in the United States. Stage Left was supported with a tour in small venues.

== Musical style ==
Featuring 13 instrumental tracks (and one with vocals, "Don't Say a Word"), Barre moves through a wide range of guitar-based styles including (but not limited to) classical and blues acoustics, progressive rock, acoustic folk, 80s-styled finger picking and even ambient electronic styles.

Martin stated that the album was conceived with most attention to the melodies, thinking always in the balance between acoustic and electric pieces. The album shows a great variety of guitars and other string instruments, as the bouzouki and the mandolin.

== Critical reception ==
The AllMusic review, by William Ruhlmann, was positive. Giving three stars, the review goes to praise Martin taste for melodies instead of simple guitar solos, also stating Martin's "highly textured approach, playing electric rock guitar much of the time as if he was playing English folk music on an acoustic."

== Track listing ==
All tracks are written by Martin Barre

| No. | Title | Length |
|---|---|---|
| 1. | "Count the Chickens (Instrumental)" | 2:40 |
| 2. | "As Told By (Instrumental)" | 3:29 |
| 3. | "A French Correction (Instrumental)" | 4:35 |
| 4. | "Murphy's Paw (Instrumental)" | 3:50 |
| 5. | "My Favourite Things (Instrumental)" | 4:04 |
| 6. | "After You After Me (Instrumental)" | 4:34 |
| 7. | "D.I.Y. (Instrumental)" | 1:55 |
| 8. | "Spanish Tears (Instrumental)" | 4:32 |
| 9. | "Stage Fright" | 4:08 |
| 10. | "Winter Snowscape (Instrumental)" | 4:46 |
| 11. | "Nelly Returns (Instrumental)" | 3:39 |
| 12. | "Celestial Servings (Instrumental)" | 2:57 |
| 13. | "I Raise My Glass to You (Instrumental)" | 2:06 |
| 14. | "Don't Say a Word" | 4:08 |

== Personnel ==
Musicians

- Martin Barre – Electric and Acoustic Guitars, Bouzouki, Flute, Mandolin
- Jonathan Noyce – Bass
- Andrew Giddings – Keyboards
- Darren Mooney – Drums
- Simon Burrett – Vocals (on "Don't Say a Word")

Additional personnel

- Mark Tucker – Recording Engineer

== Release history ==
- 2003, UK, RandM Records RAMCD002, Release date 4 August 2003, CD
- 2003, USA, Fuel 2000 061327, Release date 12 August 2003, CD
