= Suburban Rock 'n' Roll =

Studio album by Space
- Released: 8 March 2004
- Recorded: June–July 2002
- Studios: Highfield Street Studios, Liverpool
- Genres: Alternative rock; neo-psychedelia; alternative dance; sampledelia
- Length: 40:15
- Labels: RandM, Pinnacle
- Producer: Stephen Lironi

Space chronology
Tin Planet (1998)	Suburban Rock 'n' Roll (2004)	Attack of the Mutant 50ft Kebab (2014)

Singles from Suburban Rock 'n' Roll
- 1. "Zombies" Released: November 11, 2002; 2. "Suburban Rock 'n' Roll" Released: February 23, 2004; 3. "20 Million Miles from Earth" Released: May 24, 2004

Suburban Rock 'n' Roll is the third studio album (fourth counting the then-unreleased Love You More than Football) by Space, released on 8 March 2004. It is their first proper album release since 1998's Tin Planet. The tracks "Zombies", "Suburban Rock 'N' Roll" and "20 Million Miles from Earth" were released as singles, all of them failing to reach top 40.

On Suburban Rock 'n' Roll, Space sought to move away from the lush, elaborate pop sound of their two previous albums, Tin Planet and Love You More than Football, adopting a more stripped back, sample-driven style. Frontman Tommy Scott's lyrics also marked a shift from his previous character-based storytelling towards more socially conscious themes, expressing anxieties towards suburbia and the growing influence of surveillance culture. The album's sessions reunited the band with producer Stephen Lironi, who previously worked on their debut album Spiders. Suburban Rock 'n' Roll is the first Space album with no instrumentals from keyboardist Franny Griffiths, reflecting the band's decision to create a more cohesive listening experience.

Upon its release, Suburban Rock ’n’ Roll received mixed reviews from critics: some praised its more mature sound and thematic depth, while others viewed it as a disappointing return and questioned the band’s relevance in the contemporary music scene. Despite this, the album was generally well received by fans and has been cited by members of Space as a personal favourite. The band disbanded in 2005, a year after its release.

== Background ==
After touring and promotional commitments of their second album Tin Planet concluded in late 1998, Space returned to the studio to commence work on their third album, tentatively titled Love You More than Football. However, Gut Records objected to Edwyn Collins being chosen as producer, and forced the band to rework the material several times, delaying its release for over two years. A taster single from the album, "Diary of a Wimp", was released in June 2000, but was poorly received by critics and peaked outside the top 40, the band's first single to do so since "Neighbourhood" in early 1996.

Meanwhile, Gut were having massive success with Tom Jones's album Reload (which Space participated in), and promoting it became top priority for the company. Label boss Guy Holmes was no longer communicating with the band on a regular basis, which led to them feeling they were being sidelined by the label. This resulted in an altercation between frontman Tommy Scott and Holmes, which served to further strain their working relationship.

Space (pictured here in 2004) envisioned a darker, more cohesive direction with Suburban Rock 'n' Roll.

The long hiatus between albums and lack of substantial material also began affecting the band's ability to play live, as former guitarist/vocalist Jamie Murphy recalls: "When it was 3rd album time, I think we'd been away from it all for about a year and we had a tour while we had nothing out. We were doing 2000 capacity venues and there'd only be 400 people there. So we were going onstage every night going, "What the fuck's going on here? What have we done wrong?”.

Eventually, the album were scrapped in July 2001. By that time, the band had terminated their contract with Gut, which according to Scott, had taken the band a year to get out of. "One of the problems we had in the past was that we felt we were being pushed in the wrong direction – like they were trying to turn us into The Beautiful South or something, when in fact we never wanted that at all, we just wanted to be a cult band". Meanwhile, Jamie Murphy, who was growing estranged from the others, was dismissed from the line-up. According to Murphy, because tensions were running high at the time, the exchange was never made face-to-face between his bandmates, and was informed only by the management that he was out of the group. The recordings for Love You More than Football primarily existed as a bootleg, courtesy of a promotional CD-R which circulated around May 2000, before an official remixed version was released in 2019.

As a result, Space, now reduced to a four-piece and out of a record label, retreated to the studio for a couple of years, sporadically releasing several songs as MP3s free of charge to download through their website, becoming amongst the first major groups to do so. These tracks showcased a more experimental side to the band, and were eventually collated as the Music for Aliens EP.

== Recording ==
The recording sessions for Suburban Rock 'n' Roll took place between June and July 2002 at Highfield Street Studios in Liverpool. Stephen Lironi, who had previously worked with the band on their debut album Spiders, was brought on as producer, as well as contributing additional guitar and keyboard parts, with Gerald "Ged" Lynch providing percussion. Doug Trantow engineered and mixed the album with assistance from Jack Jelfs, and the final mix was mastered by Alan Yoshida at Ocean Way Studios in Hollywood.

The songs developed from a series of writing sessions between the band and Lironi at the producer's home studio in London. Bassist David "Yorkie" Palmer oversaw pre-production, and introduced Lironi to the music production software Acid Pro on his laptop. Meanwhile, Tommy Scott, a self-described 'technophobe', started adding micro-samples from a Yamaha SU10 Sampling Unit to his acoustic demos. MiniDisc recorders were also used by the band to capture found sounds like waves crashing on a beach, as well as snippets of Bert Kaempfert records found in second hand shops.

In comparison to the fraught Love You More than Football sessions, the band found working with Lironi a "cleansing" and productive experience. As the band were still unsigned at the time, they were excited to record without any constraints or outside pressure from record labels. The band would continue to write in a separate room during recording, often producing material Lironi favoured over tracks already in progress, and prompting them to record those instead. Demos were recorded quickly with only the most essential instrumentation, before being transferred to the main studio and retained in the final mix, with Scott re-recording all his vocals apart from one track, "Pretty Suicide". According to Scott, up to 40 song ideas were brought to the studio, before the group eventually settled on a concise, eleven song track listing. Out-takes from the sessions would later end up as B-sides or Music for Aliens tracks.

== Composition ==
=== Lyrics ===
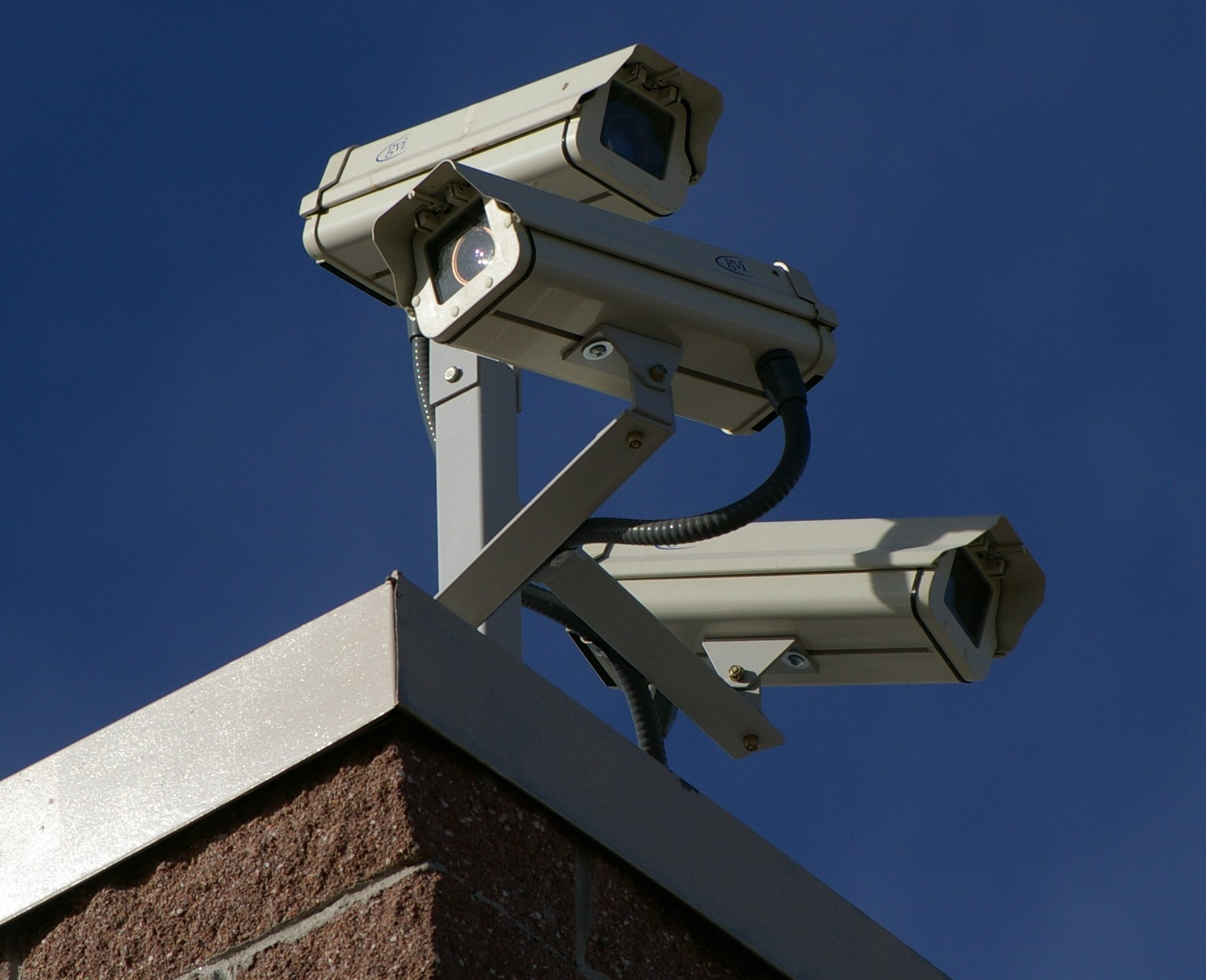
The lyrical themes of the album largely dealt with the growing influence of survelliance and voyeurism in society.

In a webcast interview in 2003, Yorkie elaborated on the concept of Suburban Rock 'n' Roll: "The album basically deals with the subject of surveillance and a certain loss of freedom in modern society. On different levels from like the tiny sort of restrictive signs you see everywhere like you know: no ball games, no trespassing, no dogs, no cycling, clean it up to more oppressive things on a larger scale such as cameras in the back of police vans, helicopters with cameras in. Generally the whole idea that even though you may think you live in the most idyllic place every place comes with its own restrictions that prohibit you doing certain things and we just found it interesting because it seems to be an unnameable group of people who put these restrictions into place, it doesn't seem to be by general consensus."

Most of the lyrics was inspired by Tommy Scott's feelings of raising a family in West Derby, a middle-class suburban area in Liverpool, and how it parallels with having grown up on a council estate plagued by high levels of crime and unemployment (as previously discussed in the song "Neighbourhood"), as well as his experiences in the music industry. Whilst speaking with Scott in the Liverpool Daily Post, writer Philip Key noted that "Suburbanites sometimes feel they are living in a world surrounded by CCTV with young kids on the rampage trying to destroy it. It's a world which Scott suggests knocks the youthful rebellious feeling out of people as they grow older and better off. He likes to consider he is still a rebel but it's a complex situation which the new album considers."

Scott singled out the album's lead single "Zombies", a self-described "electro-punk" song, as a key example of the record's themes: "Basically, it's our little dig against the voyeuristic society that we all seem to be trapped in at the moment: Big Brother, I'm a Celebrity...Get Me Out of Here!, Popstars, even Coronation Street, EastEnders, etc. People seem to forget that they have their own lives to lead. We've all become a bit numb to real experience." "Punk Rock Funeral" deals with "getting old" and "all your friends passing away", whilst "Hell's Barbecue" was inspired by graffiti Yorkie had spotted on the shutters of an adult shop that was due to open in Kensington that read "perverts keep out". The shop ultimately never opened.

=== Sound ===
Whilst recording Suburban Rock 'n' Roll, the band made a conscious decision not to repeat the sound of their last two albums, and set out to explore more experimental methods, with a greater emphasis on sampling. Jamie Murphy's departure affected the direction of the music, as Yorkie noted: "Some of the tracks have no noticeable guitar whereas you know Jamie being a proper sort of guitar hero type person wouldn't allow that, it would, if there was a space there for guitar there would be guitar. So its a little bit sparser, maybe a little bit more disciplined the sound and its allowed I think texture wise like the keyboards and other things that we use like the samples to come through a bit more." The band credited the New York synth punk duo Suicide as a big influence on the album, and would often listen to their debut album on their way to Stephen Lironi's studio, providing inspiration for the track "Pretty Suicide". Tommy Scott later cited Lou Reed's Transformer as the record he was most hoping to emulate.

Keyboardist Franny Griffiths defended the album's lack of dance tracks, which had been somewhat of a tradition on previous Space releases: "For me it's better. People might say why's there no dance tracks or maybe there's no Yorkie tracks, but I think when you listen back to it you'll see why them things aren't on it because its more consistent, even though it's all our different ideas, it's at a better blend, it runs better and you can listen to each track after each other no problem. You're not jumping from one track to another, you want to actually listen to it from start to finish."

== Release ==
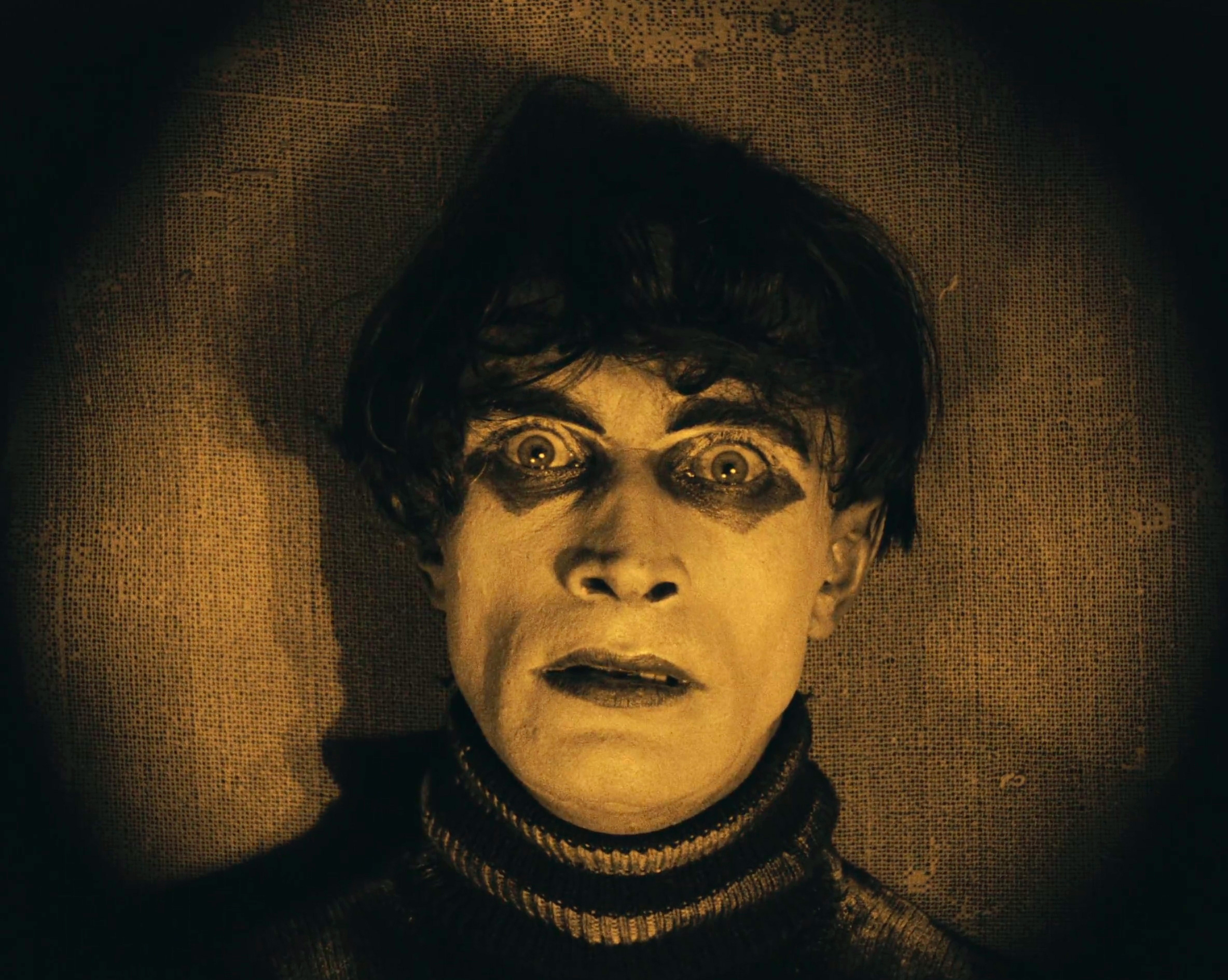
A still of actor Conrad Veidt as Cesare from the 1920 film The Cabinet of Dr. Caligari. Veidt's eyes were used in the album artwork's collage.

Suburban Rock 'n' Roll was released in March 2004. The band had initially proposed for it to be released through producer Stephen Lironi's label Mutant, who had already released the album's lead single "Zombies" in November 2002 almost 18 months earlier. However, the label began to experience financial problems, so at the end of 2003, after a brief spell at Sanctuary Records, the band eventually signed a deal with RandM Records, a label formed by veteran music industry executives Mike Andrews and Roy Eldridge from within the Chrysalis Group.

The band also ran into problems having the album artwork approved. The original sleeve was intended to depict a suburban household from the point of view of a sniper's range, but the band had lost the rights to use the original photograph due to the homeowners fearing they would be targeted by actual terrorists. Instead, a series of collages created by Tommy Scott were used as the artwork for the album and its accompanying singles. The eyes on the cover are lifted from a promotional still of German actor Conrad Veidt in his portrayal of Cesare from the film The Cabinet of Dr. Caligari, which Scott has referred to as his favourite film.

Three singles were issued from Suburban Rock 'n' Roll: "Zombies", "Suburban Rock 'n' Roll" and "20 Million Miles from Earth". "Suburban Rock 'n' Roll" was the only single that managed to chart in top 75, peaking at a lukewarm #67 in the UK, and the only one to receive an official music video, although an animated clip for "20 Million Miles from Earth" was released on the band's website. The band had shot a video for "Zombies" in late 2002, but was not released officially until it was uploaded by the user Davey Kirkham, who offered to remaster the footage with the band's permission, to YouTube on March 8, 2024, to commemorate the album's 20th anniversary. The album itself failed to chart altogether.

== Reception ==
Professional ratings
Review scores
Source	Rating
AllMusic	3/5 stars
The Independent	3/5 stars
Leeds Music Scene	4/5 stars

Reception to Suburban Rock 'n' Roll was mixed: The Independent reacted to it warmly, calling it a "mature, absorbing work" consisting of "intelligent pop songs in the mould of Pulp and Squeeze, wry refractions of contemporary life which, they'll probably be chagrined to hear, have potential hit appeal". Meanwhile, Dominic Willis of Rock TV wrote "songwriter and head honcho Tommy Scott lets it all flood out with a collection that's high on humour and musical invention. Scott likes to fascinate and confound by mixing and matching genres and, as with his Liverpudlian forebear John Lennon, his interests stretch right back to the British music hall tradition. Thanks to his keen grasp of melody, this makes Suburban Rock 'n' Roll an intriguing listen. Space have lost none of their famed idiosyncrasies, and their odd take on a strange world is as perceptive and entertaining as ever."

York Press gave the album three stars, stating, "Having lost guitarist Jamie Murphy, and parted company with major label Gut Records, the older and wiser Space are back in action on their own terms - but you can't help thinking their time has been and gone." However, they applauded the band's decision to shed much of "the irritating cartoonishness of old" and that they were "now after cult status and creative freedom, not a return to chart success. So Suburban Rock 'n' Roll is not the embarrassment it could have been".

However, others such as Chris Long of the BBC were much more critical: "The major mistake lies where it always has with Space, deep in the heart of the ever-so clever clever sub-Paul Heaton witticisms, that hurtle at your ears like a sixth form poetry show. Quite what possessed Randm to put up the cash for Suburban Rock 'n' Roll is anyone's guess, but they really shouldn't have. This is less a case of releasing a new album, than inflicting one.", whilst Tim DiGravina of AllMusic remarked, "Suburban Rock 'n' Roll is charming enough and even quite lovable in medium-sized doses, but one expects more from Space than an album of above-average and agreeably raucous tunes. For a band that once supplied highly addictive and grandiose gestures, they seem too content here to merely wink and pose."

== Aftermath ==
At the time of the album's release, Space had already set to work on a follow-up entitled Flies, and had premiered several of its songs at gigs in 2004. However, after the band decided to call it a day in 2005, the album never materialised, though a provisional tracklisting appeared on their website. Looking back on Suburban Rock 'n' Roll in 2022, both Tommy Scott and Yorkie declared it to be their favourite Space album, though acknowledged that, having been absent in the limelight for almost six years, its lack of success was down to poor timing, and its sound being at odds with the music scene at the time, which contributed to the band's split.

In 2025, Suburban Rock 'n' Roll was reissued on red vinyl for the first time as a limited run of 250 copies through Hug Records.

== Track listing ==
No.	Title	Writer(s)	Length
1.	"Suburban Rock 'n' Roll"	Tommy Scott, Space, Stephen Lironi	3:34
2.	"Zombies"	Scott, Space, Lironi	3:54
3.	"Hitch-Hiking"	Scott, Space	3:10
4.	"Punk Rock Funeral"	Scott, Space	3:17
5.	"Hell's Barbecue"	Scott, Space	4:20
6.	"Paranoid 6Teen"	Scott, Space	3:35
7.	"The English Language"	Scott, Space, Lironi	3:44
8.	"Pretty Suicide"	Scott, Space	3:39
9.	"20 Million Miles from Earth"	Scott, Space, Lironi	2:58
10.	"Quiet Beach"	Scott, Space	4:34
11.	"The Goodbye Song"	Scott, Space	3:28

== Personnel ==
Space

- Tommy Scott – lead vocals, guitar
- Franny Griffiths – keyboards, electronics, backing vocals
- Dave "Yorkie" Palmer – bass guitar, keyboards, melodica, backing vocals
- Leon Caffrey – drums

Additional musicians

- Stephen Lironi – additional guitar, keyboards
- Ged Lynch – percussion

Production

- Stephen Lironi – producer
- Dave "Yorkie" Palmer – co-producer (tracks 4, 5, 6, 8, 10 & 11), layout & design
- Doug Trantow – engineering & mixing
- Jack Jelfs – assistance
- Alan Yoshida – mastering
- Mark Cowley @ HUG Management – management
- Tommy Scott – original artwork
- Roy Elridge & Mike Andrews @ RandM – record label
