= Volcom Entertainment Vinyl Club =

- Website: http://vevc.volcom.com

Volcom Entertainment Vinyl Club (VEVC) is a yearly, paid subscription of six vinyl releases from various artists. It was founded in 2008 by Volcom Entertainment. All releases are hand-numbered, limited edition colored 7” vinyl pressings and feature original artist recordings and artwork. The VEVC 2011 is set to be available on March 1, 2011.

In 2011VEVC put out a split 7-inch vinyl of Best Coast and JEFF the Brotherhood.

== Previous releases ==
=== VEVC 2008 ===
VEVC0001 Turbonegro/Year Long Disaster
VEVC0002 Witch/Earthless
VEVC0003 RTX/Monotonix
VEVC0004 Tweak Bird/Red Fang
VEVC0005 Birds of Avalon/Dark Meat
VEVC0006 H.R./Valient Thorr

=== VEVC 2009 ===
VEVC0007 Valis/Kandi Coded
VEVC0008 Battletorn/Double Negative
VEVC0009 Harvey Milk/Wildildlife
VEVC0010 Andrew W.K./Riverboat Gamblers
VEVC0011 ASG/Karma To Burn
VEVC0012 Ancestors/Graveyard

=== VEVC 2010 ===
VEVC0013 The Sword/Year Long Disaster
VEVC0014 Saint Vitus
VEVC0015 Philm feat. Dave Lombardo
VEVC0016 Wildildlife/Flood
VEVC0017 JEFF the Brotherhood/Best Coast
VEVC0018 Earthless/Radio Moscow
