= Walk into Light =

Album by Ian Anderson

Studio album by Ian Anderson
- Released: 18 November 1983 (UK); 5 December 1983 (US)
- Recorded: Spring–Summer 1983
- Genre: Electronic rock, art rock, new wave
- Length: 38:58
- Label: Chrysalis
- Producer: Ian Anderson

Ian Anderson chronology
Walk into Light (1983)	Divinities: Twelve Dances with God (1995)

Singles from Walk into Light
- 1. "Fly By Night" Released: 25 November 1983

Professional ratings
Review scores
Source	Rating
AllMusic	3.5/5 stars

Walk into Light is the debut solo album by Jethro Tull frontman Ian Anderson, released in 1983. (The album A was originally intended to be released as an Ian Anderson album, but instead was released as a Jethro Tull album.)

Although a solo album, Walk into Light was perhaps the most collaborative work Anderson had done up to that point, as then-Jethro Tull keyboardist Peter-John Vettese co-wrote five songs and had a strong influence on the album's style and sound.

== Track listing ==
Side one
No.	Title	Writer(s)	Length
1.	"Fly By Night"	Ian Anderson, Peter-John Vettese	3:55
2.	"Made in England"	Anderson, Vettese	5:00
3.	"Walk Into Light"	Anderson	3:11
4.	"Trains"	Anderson, Vettese	3:21
5.	"End Game"	Anderson	3:20

Side two
No.	Title	Writer(s)	Length
6.	"Black and White Television"	Anderson	3:37
7.	"Toad in the Hole"	Anderson	3:24
8.	"Looking For Eden"	Anderson	3:43
9.	"User-Friendly"	Anderson, Vettese	4:03
10.	"Different Germany"	Anderson, Vettese	5:24
Total length:			38:58

== Personnel ==
- Ian Anderson – vocals, flute, guitar, bass, keyboards
- Peter-John Vettese – keyboards

== Charts ==
Chart performance for Walk into Light
Chart (2026)	Peak position
Croatian International Albums (HDU)	23
