= Infinity Cat Recordings =

American independent record label

- Founded: 2002
- Founder: Jake and Jamin Orrall (JEFF The Brotherhood)
- Distributor(s): RedEye, Dine Alone Records
- Genre: Garage rock Alternative rock Grunge; Punk rock Indie rock
- Country of origin: United States
- Location: Nashville, Tennessee
- Official website: www.infinitycat.com

Infinity Cat Recordings is an independent record label founded in 2002 and based in Nashville, Tennessee. The label has released recordings from artists including JEFF the Brotherhood, Diarrhea Planet, Be Your Own Pet, Ed Schrader's Music Beat, and Daddy Issues. In 2011, the label was highlighted by British publication The Guardian, which wrote "forget the Grand Ole Opry; there are more thrilling new bands in East Nashville than anywhere else on earth [and] so many of their records have been released on the same label, Infinity Cat." In 2011, Billboard Magazine listed Infinity Cat among the 50 best indie labels in America.

== History ==
Infinity Cat Recordings was created on July 20, 2002 by brothers Jake and Jamin Orrall and their songwriter father Robert Ellis Orrall. Jake and Jamin were 16 and 14, respectively, when they created the label. The label's first release was a live album called Tusky Mahloo by the brothers' band The Sex, which later turned into JEFF the Brotherhood. Since its inception, the label has released almost 100 albums from bands like JEFF the Brotherhood, Diarrhea Planet, Natural Child, PUJOL, and be your own PET. Infinity Cat has been described as one of the more influential labels in the Nashville rock scene, with Nashville Lifestyles describing the label as "Infinity Cat is to Nashville's garage rock as Sub Pop once was to Seattle's grunge: a label so intertwined with—and accountable for—a hyper-buzzed scene that it's naive to mention one without the other." In their recap of the label's history, the Nashville Scene wrote that "long before Third Man Records opened its doors on Seventh Avenue, Infinity Cat had already become the heart through which Nashville's punk-rock arteries pumped their noisy, vibrant blood — helping make the city synonymous with a raw, restless strain of rock 'n' roll, and doing it on almost no budget."

In 2011, Infinity Cat and JEFF the Brotherhood signed a deal with Warner Music Group. Warner Music A&R representative Ryan Whalley told Billboard Magazine that the deal was "a little different than how we usually work with bands" because the band would "maintain a foot in both Warner and Infinity Cat." In an interview with The Tennessean, Jamin stated that the boys originally had reservations about teaming up with Warner, as they felt that they did not need any help, given their success running Infinity Cat. Ultimately, they decided to sign a deal with Warner that would give them "substantial creative control," as well as wider distribution. According to Robert Ellis Orrall, starting with We Are The Champions, JEFF the Brotherhood releases would receive global distribution from WMG's Alternative Distribution Alliance under the Warner/Independent Label Group umbrella. Later that year, Infinity Cat was listed as #10 in Billboard Magazine's "Business Biz: 50 Best Indie Labels in America. Infinity Cat celebrated its 10th anniversary with two concerts on July 20 and 21, 2012. At the July 20 show, Metro Councilman At-Large Ronnie Steine read Resolution No. RS2012-339, which proclaims July 20 to be Infinity Cat Recordings Day in Nashville as "it is fitting and proper that the Metropolitan Council recognizes Infinity Cat Recording on its 10th anniversary as one of Nashville's best independent labels."

== Artists ==
Some of the bands signed to the label include:

- Be Your Own Pet
- Daddy Issues
- Denney & The Jets
- Diarrhea Planet
- Ed Schrader's Music Beat
- Music Band
- JEFF the Brotherhood

== Visitors' Center ==
Infinity Cat operates a "Visitors' Center" retail store at their headquarters. The Visitors' Center was opened as "a response to requests from fans who have wanted to stop by when they're in Nashville," and sells recordings, merchandise, and label-related rareties.

== Discography ==
Catalog #	Artist	Title	Format	Notes
ICR-01	The Sex	Tusky Mahloo	CD	
ICR-02	Jeff	I like you	CD	
ICR-03	The Sex	Have Fun With	CD	
ICR-04	Snug	Number One	CD	
ICR-05	Monkeybowl	Plastic 350	CD	
ICR-06	Something Jones	Nobody's Trying to Hurt Anyone	CD	
ICR-07	The Tennessee Black Plague	The Tennessee Black Plague	CD	
ICR-08	Steffle Flanders	Soon to be a Major Motion Picture	CD	
ICR-09	Jimmy Cushman?/The Sex	Jimmy Cushman?/The Sex	CD	
ICR-10	Andy West	Sundays and Birthdays	CD	
ICR-11	The Sex	Wake Up and Smell the Parents	CD	
ICR-12	JEFF the Brotherhood	The Byzantine Empire	CD	
ICR-13	Inverted/The Tennessee Black Plague	Inverted/The Tennessee Black Plague	Cassette	
ICR-14	Jake Latakas Orrall	Romance	CD	
ICR-15	Mike Rodgers	The Honkytonk Hitman	CD	
ICR-16	Lindsi Weaver	Grounded	CD	
ICR-17	be your own PET	Damn Damn Leash/Electric Shake	7"	
ICR-18	Monkeybowl	Ultimate	CD	
ICR-19	Mike Rodgers	Across the Borderline Insane	CD	
ICR-20	JEFF the Brotherhood	Cancer Killer/Like Fish in Water	7"	
ICR-21	be your own PET	Extra Extra EP	7"	Split release between Infinity Cat, Dimak, and XL Recordings
ICR-22	Cake Bake Betty	Songs About Teeth	CD	
ICR-23	Art Circus	Art Circus	CD	
ICR-24	Prom Night	Ride the Cosmic Unicorn	CD	
ICR-25	El Rick Haun	El Rick Haun	CD	
ICR-026	Zombies Can't Climb	Zombies Can't Climb	CD	
ICR-27	be your own PET	Not Rocket Science	LP	
ICR-28	Monkeybowl	Please Don't Drag My Christmas Down b/w Tree With The Big Lights	Digital single	
ICR-29	Art Circus	Featuring Fred Flare	Digital single	
ICR-030	JEFF the Brotherhood	Castle Storm	CD	
ICR-31	Cake Bake Betty	To The Dark Tower	CD	
ICR-32	The Mattoid	The Glory Holy	CD	
ICR-33	JEFF the Brotherhood	The Boys R Back In Town	Cassette	
ICR-34	Meemaw	Glass Elevator	7"	
ICR-35	JEFF the Brotherhood	The Boys R Back In Town	LP	
ICR-36	Wizardz	Cybersex Offender	CD	
ICR-37	Ham1	The Underground Stream	LP	
ICR-38	Daniel Lucca Pujol & Deluxin'	Timbre Shades Of Great	Cassette	
ICR-39	JEFF the Brotherhood/Screaming Females	S/T	7"	
ICR-40	JEFF the Brotherhood/Sisters	S/T	7"	
ICR-41	JEFF the Brotherhood	Rafiki's Vision	Cassette	
ICR-42	Letho/Paper Hats	Letho/Paper Hats	Cassette	
ICR-43	Heavy Cream	Heavy Cream	7"	
ICR-44	JEFF the Brotherhood	Heavy Days	LP	
ICR-45	Daniel Pujol	PUJOL	CD	
ICR-46	Denney & the Jets	Denny & The Jets	Cassette	
ICR-47	Natural Child	Shamewalkin'	7"	
ICR-48	Daniel Pujol	Ringo Where Art Thou	Cassette	
ICR-49	Natural Child	Bodyswitchers	Cassette	
ICR-50	Daniel Pujol	2010	7"	
ICR-51	JEFF the Brotherhood/Ty Segall	Split	7"	
ICR-52	Heavy Cream	Danny	LP	
ICR-53	Denny and The Jets	The Devil's Harvest	Cassette	
ICR-54	Natural Child	White Man's Burden	7"	
ICR-55	PUJOL feat.WEZ/ the little bear	Sexttape	Cassette	
ICR-56	The Paperhead	Focus In On The Looking Glass	Cassette	
ICR-57	Natural Child	1971	LP	
ICR-58	Hell Beach	Hell Beach	LP	
ICR-59	PUJOL	X-Files on Main St.	CD	
ICR-60	JEFF the Brotherhood	We Are The Champions	LP	
ICR-61	Cy Barkley	Rock Together	7"	ECONOLINE Series
ICR-62	Peach Kelli Pop	Peach Kelli Pop	LP	Debut self-titled LP originally released by Going Gaga Records in Canada
ICR-63	JEFF the Brotherhood/Greenhornes	Split	7"	
ICR-64	Diarrhea Planet	Yama-Uba	7"	Originally ECONOLINE Series, later repressed on random colored vinyl in 2014
ICR-65	Diarrhea Planet	Loose Jewels	LP	
ICR-66	Denney and the Jets	Killing Machine	7"	ECONOLINE Series
ICR-67	JEFF the Brotherhood/Hell Beach	Hole EP	7"	Originally a tour-only 7"
ICR-68	Uncle Bad Touch	Uncle Bad Touch	LP	
ICR-69	JEFF the Brotherhood	Brotherhood Of Light	LP	Collection of B-sides
ICR-70	Big Surr	Baked + Bruised	7"	ECONOLINE Series
ICR-71	Heavy Cream	Super Treatment	LP	
ICR-72	Cy Barkley & The Way Outsiders	Cy Barkley & The Way Outsiders	LP	
ICR-073	JUICEBOXX	I Don't Wanna Go Into Darkness	LP	
ICR-074	Wet Illustrated	Scorped	7"	ECONOLINE Series
ICR-077	Skimask	Cute Mutant	LP	Split release between Infinity Cat Recordings, 100% Breakfast, and Sophomore Lounge
ICR-078	Diarrhea Planet	I'm Rich Beyond Your Wildest Dreams	LP	
ICR-080	JEFF The Brotherhood	Previously Released 7"	Box Set	Repress of 7 out of print singles and a previously unreleased version of "Stay Up Late"
ICR-079	Various Artists	Hits From The Streets, Volume 1	7"	4-way split: No Regrets Coyote, Weekend Babes, OGG, Dirty Dreams
ICR-081	Diarrhea Planet	Aloha	7"	Repress of out of print 7", previously released on Evil Weevil Records
ICR-083	Ed Schrader's Music Beat	Party Jail	LP	
ICR-084	Music Band	Can I Live	Cassette	Infinity Cat Cassette Series (Year 1)
ICR-085	Various Artists	Hits From The Streets, Volume 2	7"	4-way split: Jaws, King Bitch, Study Hall, Gnarwhal
ICR-086	Ed Schrader's Music Beat	Laughing	7"	
ICR-087	Guerilla Toss	367 Equalizer	Cassette	Infinity Cat Cassette Series (Year 1)
ICR-088	Left & Right	Five Year Plan	Cassette	Infinity Cat Cassette Series (Year 1)
ICR-089	King Bitch	Lost In The Party: The Best of King Bitch	Cassette	Cassette Store Day release
ICR-091	Music Band	I Was Like	7"	
ICR-092	Diarrhea Planet	Aliens in the Outfield	10"	
ICR-093	Spanish Candles	Triple Date In Paradise	Cassette	Infinity Cat Cassette Series (Year 1)
ICR-094	Milk Dick	Romantic Superstore	Cassette	Infinity Cat Cassette Series (Year 1)
ICR-095	Rozwell Kid	Good Graphics	Cassette	Infinity Cat Cassette Series (Year 1)
ICR-096	JEFF The Brotherhood	Wasted On The Dream	LP	
ICR-098	Daddy Issues	Can We Still Hang	Cassette	Infinity Cat Cassette Series (Year 2)
ICR-099	Faux Ferocious	Faux Ferocious	Cassette	Infinity Cat Cassette Series (Year 2)
