= Wasted on the Dream =

2015 album by JEFF the Brotherhood

Studio album by JEFF the Brotherhood
- Released: March 24, 2015
- Genre: Rock
- Length: 39:28
- Label: Infinity Cat

JEFF the Brotherhood chronology
Hypnotic Nights (2012)	Wasted on the Dream (2015)	Global Chakra Rhythms (2015)

Professional ratings
Aggregate scores
Source	Rating
Metacritic	61/100
Review scores
Source	Rating
AllMusic	3.5/5 stars

Wasted on the Dream is the eighth studio album by American duo JEFF the Brotherhood. It was released in March 2015 under Infinity Cat Recordings.

== Track listing ==
No.	Title	Length
1.	"Voyage Into Dreams"	3:36
2.	"Black Cherry Pie"	4:12
3.	"Cosmic Visions"	4:02
4.	"Mystified Minds"	2:04
5.	"Melting Place"	3:49
6.	"In My Dreams"	4:17
7.	"In My Mouth"	3:07
8.	"Karaoke, TN"	3:33
9.	"Coat Check Girl"	4:21
10.	"What's a Creep"	3:09
12.	"Prairie Song"	3:18
