= Denney and The Jets =

Rock band

- Origin: Nashville, Tennessee, U.S.
- Genres: Garage rock revival, blues rock, indie rock
- Years active: 2009–present
- Labels: Limited Fanfare Records, Burger Records, Infinity Cat Recordings
- Members: Chris Denney
- Past members: Wes Traylor, Jake Orrall, Jamin Orrall, Daniel Pujol, Paul Turek, Sean Cotton, Joseph Scala, Evan Scala, Ric Alessio
- Website: www.denneyandthejets.com

Denney and The Jets is a rock band based in Nashville, Tennessee, and is the namesake of band leader Chris Denney. Denney and The Jets have toured with The Growlers, Broncho, Those Darlins, Tristen, White Fang and has supported Alabama Shakes, The Ettes, David Allan Coe, Diamond Rugs, The Greenhornes and Nikki Lane. Chris Denney's rotating cast of backing bands have included members of JEFF the Brotherhood, Natural Child, PUJOL, Blackfoot Gypsies, Promised Land Sound and Clear Plastic Masks.

== History ==
=== 2009–2011 ===
In 2009, Chris Denney began writing his tales of debauchery along with the first version of his Jets, which included Jake and Jamin Orrall of JEFF the Brotherhood and Wes Traylor of Natural Child leading to the recording of Denney and The Jets' debut self-titled digital EP. The ultra-limited cassette EP, The Devil's Harvest, followed in 2010 and after a short stint with Daniel Pujol (of PUJOL) in the band, Denney and The Jets solidified lineup of Sean Cotton (Lead Guitar), Joseph Scala (Bass) and Paul Turek (Drums) and released the 2011 "Killin' Machine" 7"—all on Nashville-based Infinity Cat Recordings.

=== 2012 ===
Drummer Evan Scala (and brother of bassist Joseph Scala) replaced Turek in early 2012 band recorded their 2nd self-titled EP (aka the Slick Rick EP) in the spring with producer and engineer Andrija Tokic at The Bomb Shelter in East Nashville, Tennessee. The EP was self-released by the band in June 2012 via bandcamp and then saw a wider release in August 2012 on Miami, Florida-based label Limited Fanfare Records with the limited cassette release on Burger Records. Denney completed a late 2011 to early 2012 residency at Ovvio Arte's Bleed The Ballroom in Nashville, which included support from Deer Tick's John McCauley, Natural Child, Tristen and Nikki Lane among others and toured later in the year with The Growlers, Derek Hoke and Tristen

=== 2013–2014 ===
Recording for the band's debut LP, Mexican Coke, began in June 2013 again with Andrija Tokic (Alabama Shakes, Hurray for the Riff Raff, Majestico) and Chris Denney producing with the Nashville-via-Brooklyn, New York band Clear Plastic Masks backing and co-producing in the studio. 2013 Festival appearances at SXSW, Sailor Jerry's Cobra Fest (Chicago) and WARMFest (Indianapolis) led up to the February 2014 single release of "Bye Bye Queenie" and the announcement of Mexican Coke's April 8, 2014, release on Burger Records/Limited Fanfare Records. The band celebrated the release of Mexican Coke with an intimate in-store performance at FOND OBJECT in Nashville, leading into a tour with Portland's White Fang in April 2014 and culminating with an April 26 in-store performance at Grimey's New and Preloved Music in Nashville. The video for "Bye Bye Queenie" was premiered on The A.V. Club in late May 2014 and was directed and edited by Mexican Coke cover artist Josh Shearon—which features BIRDCLOUD's Makenzie Green. The band supported Robert Francis and The Night Tide in Southeast US in June 2014 and did a handful of SE dates on the 2014 'Burger Caravan of Stars Tour' with Natural Child.

=== 2023 ===
In late 2023, their song Darlin’ was featured in episode 2, season 2 of Reacher on Amazon Prime.

== Discography ==
=== Albums ===
- Mexican Coke (Burger/Limited Fanfare – April 8, 2014) [Vinyl/CD/Cassette/Digital]

=== EPs ===
- Denney and The Jets (Infinity Cat – 2009) [Digital]
- The Devil's Harvest (Infinity Cat – 2010) [Cassette/Digital]
- Denney and The Jets (CD/Digital on Limited Fanfare Records – August 21, 2012, and Cassette via Burger Records) [CD/Cassette/Digital]

=== Singles ===
- Killin' Machine (Infinity Cat – 2011) [7" Vinyl/Digital]

=== Compilations ===
- Limited Fanfare Records 2014 Spring/Summer Sampler (Limited Fanfare Records 2014) – "Bye Bye Queenie" & "Mama's Got The Blues"
- Now That's What I Call Burger – Vol. 5 (Burger Records 2014) "Bye Bye Queenie"
- Insound Vinyl Mixtape v.23 (Insound March 2014) – "Mama's Got The Blues"
- CMJ Mixtape April 2014 (CMJ 2014) – "Bye Bye Queenie"
- Limited Fanfare Records Spring/Summer Sampler 2013 (Limited Fanfare Records 2013) – "Fun Girls"
- The Wiener Dog Comp (Wiener Records/Burger Records 2012) – "New York Love" (exclusive track)
