= Ugly When I Cry =

Single by Daddy Issues

from the album Can We Still Hang
- Released: September 18, 2014
- Recorded: 2014
- Studio: The Beech House, Nashville, Tennessee
- Genre: Grunge, alternative rock
- Length: 3:19
- Label: Infinity Cat Records
- Songwriter: Daddy Issues
- Producer: Casey Weissbuch

Daddy Issues singles chronology
| "Pizza Girl" (2014) | "Ugly When I Cry" (2014) | "Drop Out" (2015) |

"Ugly When I Cry" is a song by American grunge band Daddy Issues. It is the second single released by the band. Originally released a non-album single in 2014, it was included in their debut LP, Can We Still Hang, after signing with Infinity Cat Records a year later.

== Background ==
After forming in January 2014, the group had self-released two singles months later: "Pizza Girl" and "Ugly When I Cry".

== Reception ==
After its initial release on SoundCloud, it went viral, garnering over 500,000 views. The song has been praised for its 1990s grunge-influenced sound.
