= Divinities: Twelve Dances with God =

1995 studio album by Ian Anderson

Studio album by Ian Anderson
- Released: 2 May 1995
- Recorded: Autumn 1994
- Genre: Worldbeat, Classical, new age
- Length: 47:03
- Label: EMI
- Producer: Ian Anderson

Ian Anderson chronology
Walk into Light (1983)	Divinities: Twelve Dances with God (1995)	The Secret Language of Birds (2000)

Professional ratings
Review scores
Source	Rating
Allmusic	link

Divinities: Twelve Dances with God (1995) is the second studio album by Jethro Tull frontman Ian Anderson.

All 12 tracks are instrumental and are influenced by different ethnic musical traditions: Celtic ("In the Grip of Stronger Stuff"), Spanish ("In the Pay of Spain"), African ("En Afrique") and so on.

Anderson undertook a solo tour in 1995, playing the entire album, start-to-finish, as the first half of the concert. The second half was Jethro Tull material, many played as an instrumental version. The band was composed of Jethro Tull members Andrew Giddings and Doane Perry, future Tull member Jonathan Noyce, and Chris Leslie.

== Track listing ==
No.	Title	Length
1.	"In a Stone Circle"	3:25
2.	"In Sight of the Minaret"	3:54
3.	"In a Black Box"	3:24
4.	"In the Grip of Stronger Stuff"	2:48
5.	"In Maternal Grace"	3:21
6.	"In the Moneylender's Temple"	3:19
7.	"In Defence of Faiths"	3:11
8.	"At Their Father's Knee"	5:43
9.	"En Afrique"	2:54
10.	"In the Olive Garden"	2:50
11.	"In the Pay of Spain"	4:05
12.	"In the Times of India (Bombay Valentine)"	8:09
Total length:		47:03

== Personnel ==
- Ian Anderson – concert and bamboo flutes
- Andrew Giddings – keyboards
- Doane Perry – tuned and untuned percussion
- Douglas Mitchell – clarinet
- Christopher Cowrie – oboe
- Jonathon Carrey – violin
- Nina Gresin – cello
- Randy Wigs – harp
- Sid Gander – French horn
- Den Redding – trumpet
