= Daddy Issues (band) =

American grunge pop group

- Origin: Nashville, Tennessee, United States
- Genres: Grunge; Punk rock; Pop
- Years active: 2014–present
- Label: Infinity Cat Recordings
- Members: Jenna Moynihan; Emily Maxwell
- Past members: Jenna Mitchell
- Website: daddyissuesband.bandcamp.com

Daddy Issues is an American grunge pop duo from Nashville, Tennessee, consisting of guitarist/singer Jenna Moynihan, drummer Emily Maxwell, and previously bassist Jenna Mitchell. The band is signed to indie label Infinity Cat Recordings.

== Early years ==
The band formed in January 2014 after Moynihan saw the words "Daddy Issues" graffitied on the wall of a now-defunct venue and mistook it for an all-girl punk band; upon discovering that no such active band existed, they decided to start their own. The three met while attending Belmont University together. In May of that year, Daddy Issues self-released their first single "Pizza Girl". Their second single, "Ugly When I Cry," went viral on SoundCloud, garnering nearly 300,000 plays.

In March 2015, Daddy Issues performed at South by Southwest as an official showcase artist, after which the band began recording an EP. In May, the band performed as an official Canadian Music Week artist, despite being American. In their review of Daddy Issues' CMW show, Exclaim! said "if there is any justice in the world, [their songs would] appear on the soundtrack for every teen movie next year. Most of their songs were fun little tunes that set out to celebrate all the things that young women, teen girls especially, are shamed for: fangirling, obsessions, feeling things for the sake of feeling things, and eating a lot of pizza."

Later that May, it was announced that Can We Still Hang would be released as part of the limited edition Infinity Cat Recordings Cassette Series. The first single from the album, "The Bruise," debuted on The Wild Magazine. In June, Portland-based feminist magazine Bitch Magazine premiered the next single, "Unicorns & Rainbows," which they described as "a track about rejecting potential boyfriends and how girls are not actually made of sugar, spice, and everything nice." Soon after, the band contributed a "witchy grunge" playlist for the magazine's weekly feminist mixtape column, Bitchtapes.

== First album and later releases ==
On June 30, 2015, Daddy Issues released their first album Can We Still Hang on cassette and digital download. The album was recorded by Jacob Corenflos of fellow Infinity Cat band Jawws, produced by Casey Weissbuch (Slanted, Colleen Green, Mitski), and mixed by Robert Ellis Orrall (Taylor Swift, Reba, Be Your Own Pet). During the summer, Daddy Issues toured in support of Can We Still Hang, playing with bands like JEFF The Brotherhood, Colleen Green, and White Reaper. In September 2015, Paste Magazine profiled the band in their "The Best Of What's Next" feature, writing, "What makes Daddy Issues so refreshing lies in their lyrical content. Channeling the innermost feelings of a self-aware twenty-something girl in snappy one-liners is second nature for the troupe... The future of Daddy Issues is certainly an exciting one."

The band released a split 7-inch with Louisville's White Reaper on Christmas 2015, along with two behind-the-scenes music videos for Consequence of Sound's Treehouse Sessions. The next February, they began recording their full-length album at Converse's Rubber Tracks Studio with producer Jake Orrall (JEFF The Brotherhood, Colleen Green).

In March 2017, Daddy Issues announced their new full-length vinyl release Deep Dream with the premiere of their new single, "In Your Head," on The Fader. The album was produced by Jake Orrall and was released May 19 on Infinity Cat Recordings.

== Discography ==
=== Singles ===
- "Pizza Girl" (2014)
- "Ugly When I Cry" (2014)
- "Drop Out" (2015)
- "In Your Head" (2017)

=== Albums ===
- Can We Still Hang (2015)
- Deep Dream (2017)
