= Jeff the Brotherhood =

American rock band

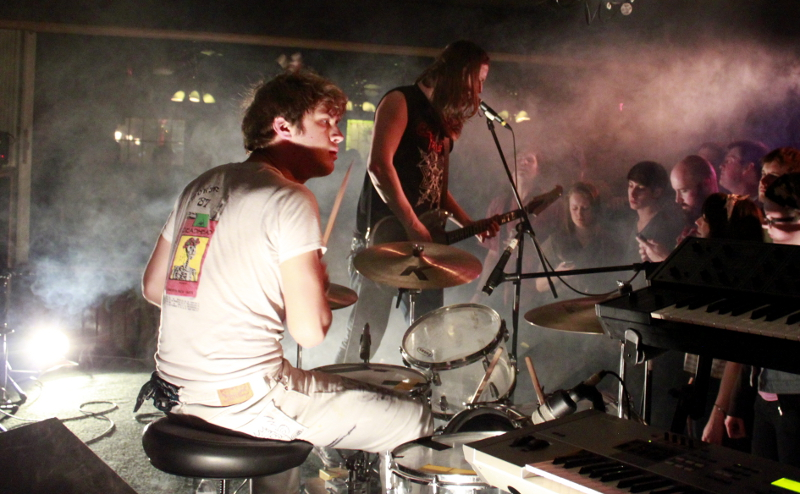
- Jeff the Brotherhood performing in Iowa City, Iowa, in 2013. (L-R: Jamin and Jake Orrall)

Background information
- Origin: Nashville, Tennessee, United States
- Years active: 2001–present
- Labels: Infinity Cat, Third Man, Warner Bros., Dine Alone Records (Worldwide Distributor)
- Members: Jake Orrall; Jamin Orrall

Jeff the Brotherhood is an American two-piece rock band consisting of brothers Jake and Jamin Orrall, hailing from Nashville, Tennessee. Their style has been described by music writers as containing elements of psychedelic rock, garage rock, punk and pop. They have released five original LPs on the label Infinity Cat, one live album on Third Man Records, and assorted singles and splits with noted artists such as Ty Segall, Best Coast, and Screaming Females. They tour extensively and have played shows across the United States and internationally.

== History ==
=== Early years ===
Brothers Jake and Jamin Orrall are the sons of successful producer, singer, and songwriter Robert Ellis Orrall and grew up surrounded by music. They founded Jeff the Brotherhood (originally simply called Jeff) in 2001, while still in high school. Their first album, I Like You, was funded using pre-orders from the audience at a show for their side project, The Sex. Although this work did not see widespread exposure, it received critical acclaim. They started several other bands and side projects, including post-punk quartet Be Your Own Pet, eventually leaving them all and moving from Nashville to Chicago in order to pursue Jeff the Brotherhood full time. The band returned to Nashville when Jamin dropped out of Columbia College Chicago.

=== Heavy Days and Hypnotic Nights ===
Throughout the 2000s, they released several limited-release albums and toured extensively. The band began to receive nationwide attention in 2009 with the release of Heavy Days; although the album is their fifth, it is often mistakenly reported to be their first. Soon afterwards, they collaborated with Best Coast on an EP released on Volcom and released a live album on Jack White's Third Man Records.

In 2011, Jeff the Brotherhood and their family label, Infinity Cat Recordings, signed a deal with Warner Music Group that would give them "substantial creative control", as well as wider distribution. According to their father, Robert Ellis Orrall, starting with We Are The Champions, Jeff the Brotherhood releases would receive global distribution from WMG's Alternative Distribution Alliance under the Warner/Independent Label Group umbrella. Warner Music A&R representative Ryan Whalley told Billboard magazine that the deal was "a little different than how we usually work with bands" because the band would "maintain a foot in both Warner and Infinity Cat".

In 2012, Jeff the Brotherhood performed live instrumentation for Insane Clown Posse's single for Third Man Records, "Leck mich im Arsch", a rearrangement of a Wolfgang Amadeus Mozart composition produced by Jack White. They also released a live EP recorded at United Record Pressing called Upstairs At United, Vol. 3 for Record Store Day.

Jeff the Brotherhood teamed up with Dan Auerbach to produce their latest studio album and first album on Warner Bros. Records, Hypnotic Nights. The album was recorded in just one week at Dan's Easy Eye Sound Studio in Nashville, TN and was released on July 17, 2012. "We've never worked with a producer before, so this was the first time we'd ever had any outside input", says Jamin. "It was Dan's first co-production, too, and it really worked. He just hung out, let us do our thing and helped when we needed it." Adds Jake, "We write songs without anyone else in mind, so Dan brought in this idea of, 'Well, you guys do what you do and I'll present it so everyone else will understand.'"

On July 9, 2012, NPR Music began streaming the entirety of their 7th album, entitled Hypnotic Nights.

=== Wasted on the Dream ===
Jeff the Brotherhood was initially due to release their second album for Warner Bros., Wasted on the Dream, on March 10, 2015. However, on February 17, 2015, the band announced that it had been dropped from the label and would instead release the album on March 24, 2015 via Infinity Cat.

For this LP the band included Jack Lawrence of The Greenhornes and The Raconteurs on bass. In addition to Lawrence, Wasted On The Dream features guest contributions from Bethany Cosentino of Best Coast, who sings on "In My Dreams", plus Diarrhea Planet guitarists Evan Bird and Emmett Miller as well as rock veteran Ian Anderson of Jethro Tull, who provides the flute solo on "Black Cherry Pie".

For the Summer 2015 tour, the two piece band beefed up to a four piece touring unit to provide a larger sound and to relieve some of the tedium associated with touring as a two-person group over so many years. Chet Jameson was included on bass guitar and Kunal Prakash filled in on second guitar.

== Media exposure ==
=== Print ===
The band was named one of Spin magazine's "must-hear acts" at 2011's South by Southwest festival, one of Spin's "best spring tours" of 2011 and one of the "Best of What's Next" by Paste magazine in 2010.

=== Radio ===
BBC Radio's Zane Lowe has sung the band's praises, calling them "super endearing garage rock" in an interview.

Hypnotic Nights reached No. 1 on the CMJ Radio 200 Album Chart on August 14, 2012.

The band appeared on the NPR program tiny desk, where they played a four-song set.

They also played on KEXP in 2014 and 2015

=== Film and television ===
The band appeared on the PBS program We Have Signal, where they were the subject of a half-hour-long segment.

The band's song "U Got the Look" is featured in the comedy film Cedar Rapids.

The band appeared on Late Night with Jimmy Fallon, playing their song "Diamond Way".

The band performed their new single "Sixpack" on the Late Show with David Letterman on July 17, 2012, the release date of their album Hypnotic Nights.

The band had a few songs in the "Capita: Defenders of Awesome" snowboard movie.

The band's song "Sixpack" was featured in the updated version of Vinewood Boulevard Radio in Grand Theft Auto V.

== Discography ==
=== Studio albums ===
- I Like You (2002)
- The Byzantine Empire (2005)
- Castle Storm (2006)
- The Boys R Back in Town (2008)
- Heavy Days (2009)
- We Are the Champions (2011)
- Hypnotic Nights (2012) US No. 198
- Wasted on the Dream (2015)
- Global Chakra Rhythms (2015)
- Zone (2016)
- Magick Songs (2018)

=== Live albums ===
- Live at Third Man (2011)
- Halloween 2015 (2015)

=== EPs ===
- Upstairs at United, Vol. 3 (2012)
- Hypnotic Knights (2012)
- Dig the Classics (2014)

=== Singles ===
Year	Single	Label(s)	Format	Album
2005	"Cancer Killer"	Infinity Cat Recordings	7" vinyl+DVD	The Byzantine Empire
2009	"Heavy Damage"	Crystal Swan/Infinity Cat Recordings	7" vinyl	Heavy Days
2010	"U Got the Look/The Tropics"	Too Pure	7" vinyl	Heavy Days
2010	"Mellow Out"	Suicide Squeeze Records	7" vinyl	We Are the Champions
2011	"Shredder" (Golden Label Contest)	United/Infinity Cat Recordings	5" vinyl	We Are the Champions
2011	"Whatever I Want"	Third Man Records	7" vinyl	Non-album singles
2011	"Health and Strength (Heavy Version)"	Infinity Cat Recordings	7" flexi disc	Non-album singles
2011	"Something in the Way"	Infinity Cat Recordings	7" flexi disc	Non-album singles
2011	"Stay Up Late"	Stolen Recordings	Promo CD	We Are the Champions
2012	"Dark Energy"	Infinity Cat Recordings/Warner Bros. Records	7" vinyl	Hypnotic Nights
2013	"Melting Place"	William Street Records	Digital download	Wasted on the Dream
2015	"Coat Check Girl"	Warner Bros. Records	Digital download	Wasted on the Dream
2015	"Black Cherry Pie"	Infinity Cat Recordings	Digital download	Wasted on the Dream
2016	"Punishment"	Dine Alone Records	Digital download	Zone
2016	"Idiot"	Dine Alone Records	Digital download	Zone

=== Split singles ===
Year	Single	Other artist	Label(s)	Album
2009	"Mind Ride" b/w "Highway Scratch"	Sisters	Death By Audio/Infinity Cat Recordings	Heavy Days
2009	"Bone Jam" b/w "I Do/Untitled"	Screaming Females	Infinity Cat Recordings	Heavy Days
2010	"Diamond Way" b/w "My Head Explodes"	Ty Segall	Infinity Cat Recordings	We Are the Champions
2011	"Bummer" b/w "Sunny Adventure"	Best Coast	Volcom Ent./Infinity Cat Recordings	We Are the Champions
2011	"Health and Strength" b/w "Lampfire"	The Greenhornes	Infinity Cat Recordings	We Are the Champions
