= Carducci String Quartet =

The Carducci String Quartet is a string quartet based in the United Kingdom. It consists of Matthew Denton (violin), Michelle Fleming (violin), Eoin Schmidt-Martin, (viola), and Emma Denton (cello).

The ensemble first played in 1997. It covers a broad range, music with folk origins, classic quartets such as those of Haydn, new works, and they have built a reputation for complete Shostakovich cycles.

They are published on Carducci Classics, and on Naxos.

They have received positive reviews of their performances from The Times and The Guardian.

== Awards ==
The quartet has won international competitions including Concert Artists Guild International Competition USA 2007 and First Prize at Finland's Kuhmo International Chamber Music Competition 2004. In 2016, they won the Royal Philharmonic Society Award for their Shostakovich Quartets.
