= Blackfoot Gypsies =

- Origin: Nashville, Tennessee, United States
- Genres: Blues rock, hard rock, punk rock, southern rock, indie rock, folk rock
- Years active: 2010–present
- Labels: Plowboy Records
- Members: Matthew Paige; Zack Murphy; Dylan Whitlow
- Past members: Chris Denney and Ollie Dogg Horton
- Website: Official website

Blackfoot Gypsies are an American five-piece rock band from Nashville, Tennessee, United States. Their music is influenced by blues, punk rock, southern rock, soul, Americana and country. They are known for their DIY aesthetic and extensive touring.

In 2013, the band headlined Muddy Roots Music Festival.They have appeared at Auston City Limits, Pilgrimage and Railbird Festivals. As of January, 2020, the band has reached nearly 15,000 Facebook likes.

On January 23, 2015, the band signed with label Plowboy Records. On January 28, the band released their new single, "Under My Skin", and announced April 14, 2015, as the release date of their second album, Handle It. The record was their first on Plowboy Records. Subsequent releases included To The Top and Live At The Basement.

In January 2021, Blackfoot Gypsies released their first single "New Way of Life" under the new band name, DeeOhGee.

== History ==
The band formed in 2010 as a two-piece of Matthew Paige and Zachary Murphy. Past line-ups have included Chris Denney of Denney and The Jets. DeeOhGee have toured with White Fang, and Alabama Shakes, Tyler Childers, The Darkness and Blues Traveler. In 2013, the band headlined Muddy Roots Music Festival. In 2017, the band opened for Buddy Guy during several shows of his 2017 tour.

== Members ==
- Matthew Paige - vocals, guitar
- Zack Murphy - drums, percussion
- Dylan Whitlow - bass

== Discography ==
=== Studio albums ===
- On The Loose (2012) Self-Released (Available as LP, Special Edition LP, CD or MP3)
- Handle It (2015)
- To the Top (2017)
- Live at the Basement (2020)
- New Way of Life (2021)

=== EPs ===
- "Dandee Cheeseball" (2011) Self-released (Available as free download)
- "Blackfoot Gypsies EP" (2010) Self-released (Available as CD or MP3)

=== Singles ===
- "The New Sounds of Transwestern" (2013) Fat Elvis Records (Limited 7")
- "Under My Skin" (2015)
