= Diarrhea Planet =

American garage punk band

- Origin: Nashville, Tennessee, United States
- Genres: Alternative rock, garage punk, indie rock, pop punk, post-hardcore, garage rock
- Years active: 2009–2018, 2022-present
- Label: Infinity Cat Recordings
- Members: Jordan Smith; Mike Boyle; Brent Toler; Emmett Miller; Evan Bird; Ian Bush
- Past members: Evan Donohue; Casey Weissbuch
- Website: diarrheaplanet.blogspot.com

Diarrhea Planet is an American six-piece garage punk band from Nashville, Tennessee, United States, formed in 2009. The band is composed of singer-guitarist Jordan Smith, guitarist-singer Emmett Miller, guitarist Evan Bird, guitarist-singer Brent Toler, bassist Mike Boyle, and drummer Ian Bush. Diarrhea Planet has described its sound as "pop played through the filter of heavy metal" and have cited influences such as Jimi Hendrix, AC/DC, The Rolling Stones, and Dokken.

== History ==
Diarrhea Planet was formed by singer-guitarist Jordan Smith and original guitarist Evan Donahue in their dorm room while they were students at Belmont University.

The band self-released their first EP, Aloha!, in 2009, receiving over 10,000 free downloads. The band would soon sign to independent label Infinity Cat Recordings, and released their first full-length, Loose Jewels, with the label in 2011. Their 2013 release, I'm Rich Beyond Your Wildest Dreams, was produced and mixed by Kevin S. McMahon at Marcata Recording over the course of just eight days, consisting almost entirely of live takes. It would bring the band its most attention yet, and led to appearances at festivals including SXSW, Bonnaroo, and Governors Ball Music Festival. To promote the album, the band released music videos for tracks "Separations", "Ugliest Son", and "Babyhead".

The track "Separations" was used in the soundtrack of the HBO show Animals., appearing in the end credits of "Rats" (the Pilot episode for the series) as well as making occasional appearances throughout the show, (along with other modern punk songs by both Diarrhea Planet and other bands, adding to the urban aesthetic of the show).

On March 8, 2016, Diarrhea Planet announced their third album, Turn To Gold, through a lengthy Buzzfeed feature that also debuted their new single "Life Pass." The band has stated that this album is more mature and grander than their previous works, referring to it as their Back in Black. Soon after, the band returned to SXSW as an official artist and embarked on a west coast tour with labelmates Music Band. On April 11, Diarrhea Planet released their follow-up single "Let It Out" along with a preorder of the upcoming album.

On July 23, 2018, the band announced their breakup, stating that the band "has run its course." On September 6, 7 and 8, they played three farewell shows in Nashville. The band's final show was in October 2018 at the Ryman Auditorium, where they opened for Jason Isbell. During their final song, "Emmet's Vision" they were joined onstage by Isbell and Sturgill Simpson.

On August 10, 2022, the band announced a two date reunion on November 22 and 23 at Exit/In in their hometown. It was unknown if this was a one (two) off show or the start a full reunion, but on January 10, 2023 it was announced that the band would be performing at Bonnaroo in June 2023.

== Band name and legacy ==
In 2021, Mike Rampton of Kerrang named Diarrhea Planet as the fourth "most offensive band name of all time." Diarrhea Planet guitarist-vocalist Jordan Smith has stated that the band chose its name simply "to annoy people." He said: "We were joking about making a really ridiculous noise band that would just be super irritating to every single person, and we tried to think of the most irritating band name that we could think of. I knew it had to have the word diarrhea in it, because it can’t have any real cuss words in it. That’s too obvious. We were trying to be annoying, so we came up with something immature. It was Diarrhea Planet, and we thought it was really funny."

== Members ==
Current

- Jordan Smith – guitar, vocals (2009–2018, 2022-present)
- Brent Toler – guitar, vocals (2009–2018, 2022-present)
- Mike Boyle – bass (2009–2018, 2022-present)
- Emmett Miller – guitar, vocals (2010–2018, 2022-present)
- Evan Bird – guitar (2010–2018, 2022-present)
- Ian Bush – drums (2014–2018, 2022-present)

Former

- Evan P. Donohue – guitar (2009–2010)
- Casey Weissbuch – drums (2009–2014)

== Discography ==
=== Studio albums ===
- Loose Jewels (2011)
- I'm Rich Beyond Your Wildest Dreams (2013)
- Turn to Gold (2016)

=== EPs ===
- Aloha! (2009)
- Yama-Uba (2011)
- Aliens in the Outfield (2014)
