= RandM Records =

RandM Records is a rock record label based in the UK

RandM Entertainment was started in 1998, by music industry executives Roy Eldridge and Mike Andrews, who together have a combined 50 years of experience in the industry. This was whilst with Papillon which was then part of Chrysalis Group. In 2002 this was spun off and RandM Records set up.

== Artists ==
- Ian Anderson
- Martin Barre
- Jethro Tull
- Andy Summers
- Bill Wyman
- Gordon Haskell
- Barbara Dickson
- Space

== See also ==
- List of record labels
