= Fuel 2000 =

American independent record label

- Type: Private
- Industry: Record label
- Genre: Jazz
- Founded: 1994; 32 years ago United States
- Headquarters: Los Angeles, California, United States
- Website: Official site

Fuel 2000 is an independent record label, formed in 1994 as part of the Fuel Label Group, one of the biggest independent record labels. It has amassed a catalog with over 20,000 master recordings. Since its inception, the company has released over 900 album titles, including reissues and offerings from Jethro Tull, Deep Purple, Julian Lennon, Creedence Clearwater Revisited, Ian Hunter, Edgar Winter, Jefferson Starship, The Smithereens, Berlin, Missing Persons, Culture Club, Sheena Easton, Asia, The Rembrandts, The Archies, The Zombies, Phil Seymour, Carla Olson and many others.

The Fuel Label Group was acquired by IP investment fund 43 North Broadway, LLC. in 2015.

== See also ==
- List of record labels
