= Bloody (disambiguation) =

Bloody is an intensifier in British English, often used in such phrases as "bloody Hell" or "bloody murder".

Bloody may also refer to:

- The adjective of blood

== Places ==
- Bloody Bay, the site of a 15th-century Scottish naval battle - see Battle of Bloody Bay
- Bloody Canyon, California, United States
- Bloody Falls, a waterfall in Nunavut, Canada
- Bloody Lake, Minnesota, United States

== People ==
- William T. Anderson (1840–1864), pro-Confederate guerrilla leader during the American Civil War known as "Bloody Bill"
- Bloody Benders, a family of serial killers who lived and operated in Labette County, Kansas from 1871 to 1873
- Bloody Bill Cunningham (1756–1787), American loyalist infamous for perpetrating a series of bloody massacres during the American Revolutionary War
- Mary I of England (1516–1558), Roman Catholic Queen of England and Ireland, called "Bloody Mary" by her Protestant enemies
- Nicholas II of Russia (1868–1918), last Czar of Russia, nicknamed "Nicholas the Bloody" by his enemies
- Banastre Tarleton (1754–1833), British officer in the American Revolutionary War known as "Bloody Ban"

== Other uses ==
- "Bloody", a song by Five Finger Death Punch on their 2018 album And Justice for None

== See also ==
- Bloody Mary (disambiguation)
- Bloody Sunday (disambiguation)
