= John Muir =

Scottish-American naturalist (1838–1914)

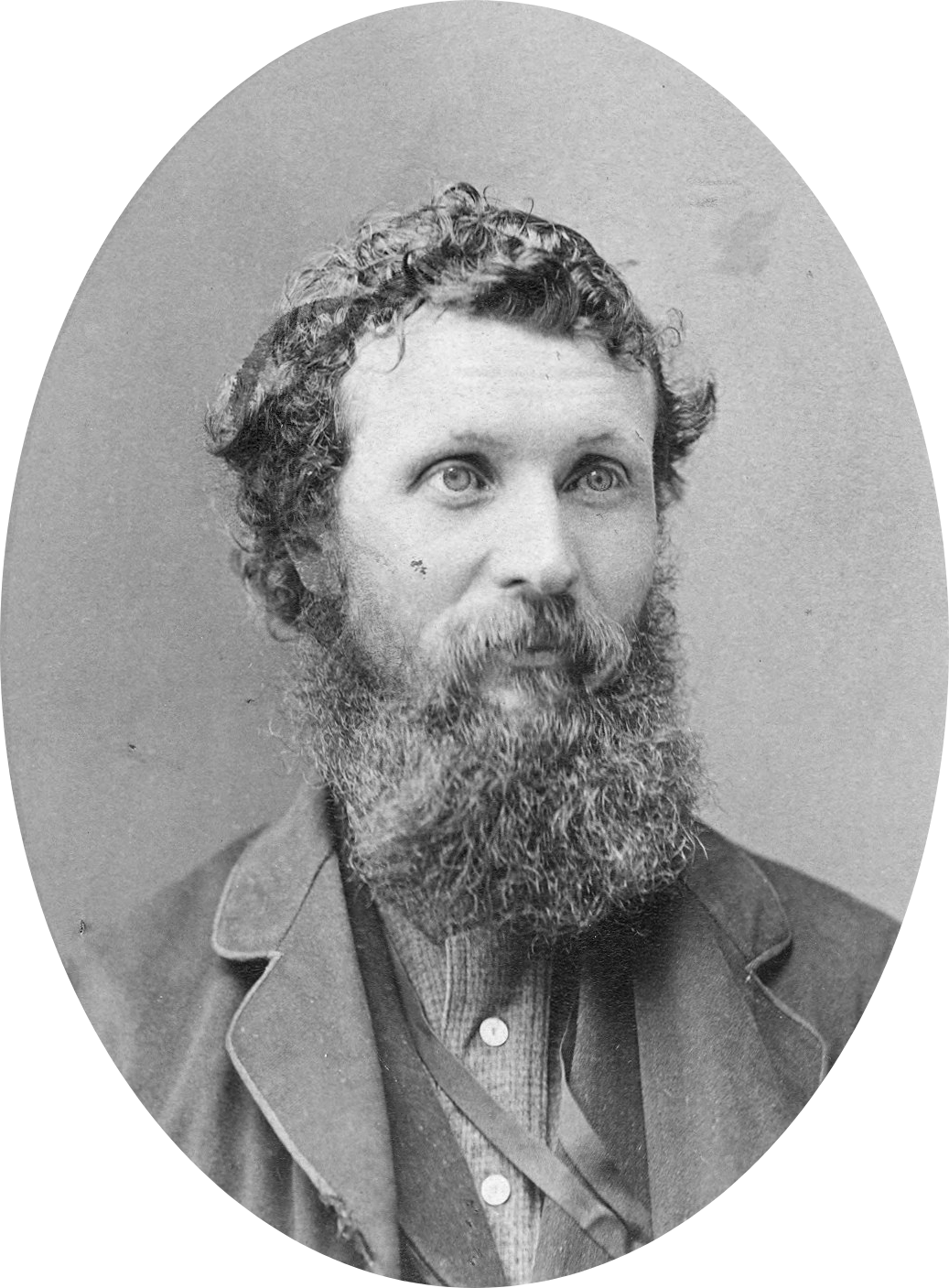
- Portrait by Carleton E. Watkins c. 1875
- Born: April 21, 1838; Dunbar, Scotland
- Died: December 24, 1914 (aged 76); Los Angeles, California, U.S.
- Education: University of Wisconsin–Madison
- Occupations: Farmer; inventor; naturalist; philosopher; writer; botanist; zoologist; geologist; environmentalist
- Spouse: Louisa Strentzel (m. 1880; died 1905)
- Children: 2

John Muir (/mjʊər/ MURE; April 21, 1838 – December 24, 1914), also known as "John of the Mountains" and "Father of the National Parks", was a Scottish-born American naturalist, author, environmental philosopher, botanist, zoologist, glaciologist, and early advocate for the preservation of wilderness in the United States.

His books, letters and essays describing his adventures in nature, especially in the Sierra Nevada, have been read by millions. His activism helped to preserve the Yosemite Valley and Sequoia National Park, and his example has served as an inspiration for the preservation of many other wilderness areas. The Sierra Club, which he co-founded, is a prominent American conservation organization. In his later life, Muir devoted most of his time to his wife and the preservation of the Western forests. As part of the campaign to make Yosemite a national park, Muir published two landmark articles on wilderness preservation in The Century Magazine, "The Treasures of the Yosemite" and "Features of the Proposed Yosemite National Park"; this helped support the push for the US Congress to pass a bill in 1890 establishing Yosemite National Park. The spiritual quality and enthusiasm toward nature expressed in his writings has inspired readers, including presidents and congressmen, to take action to help preserve large nature areas.

John Muir has been considered "an inspiration to both Scots and Americans". Muir's biographer, Steven J. Holmes, believes that Muir has become "one of the patron saints of twentieth-century American environmental activity", both political and recreational. As a result, his writings are commonly discussed in books and journals, and he has often been quoted by nature photographers such as Ansel Adams. "Muir has profoundly shaped the very categories through which Americans understand and envision their relationships with the natural world", writes Holmes.

Muir was noted for being an ecological thinker, political spokesman, and environmental advocate, whose writings became a personal guide into nature for many people, making his name "almost ubiquitous" in the modern environmental consciousness. A fierce advocate for wildlife, Muir believed in complete preservationism—the idea that plants, animals, and natural resources found in the environment should be completely off-limits to humans. Indeed, his philosophy became a tenet of the National Park Service, which bans hunting at most major parks, ensuring that endangered or protected species remain in the ecosystems that they sustain and reside in. According to author William Anderson, Muir exemplified "the archetype of our oneness with the earth", while biographer Donald Worster says he believed his mission was "saving the American soul from total surrender to materialism". On April 21, 2013, the first John Muir Day was celebrated in Scotland, which marked the 175th anniversary of his birth, paying homage to the conservationist.

== Early life ==
=== Boyhood in Scotland ===
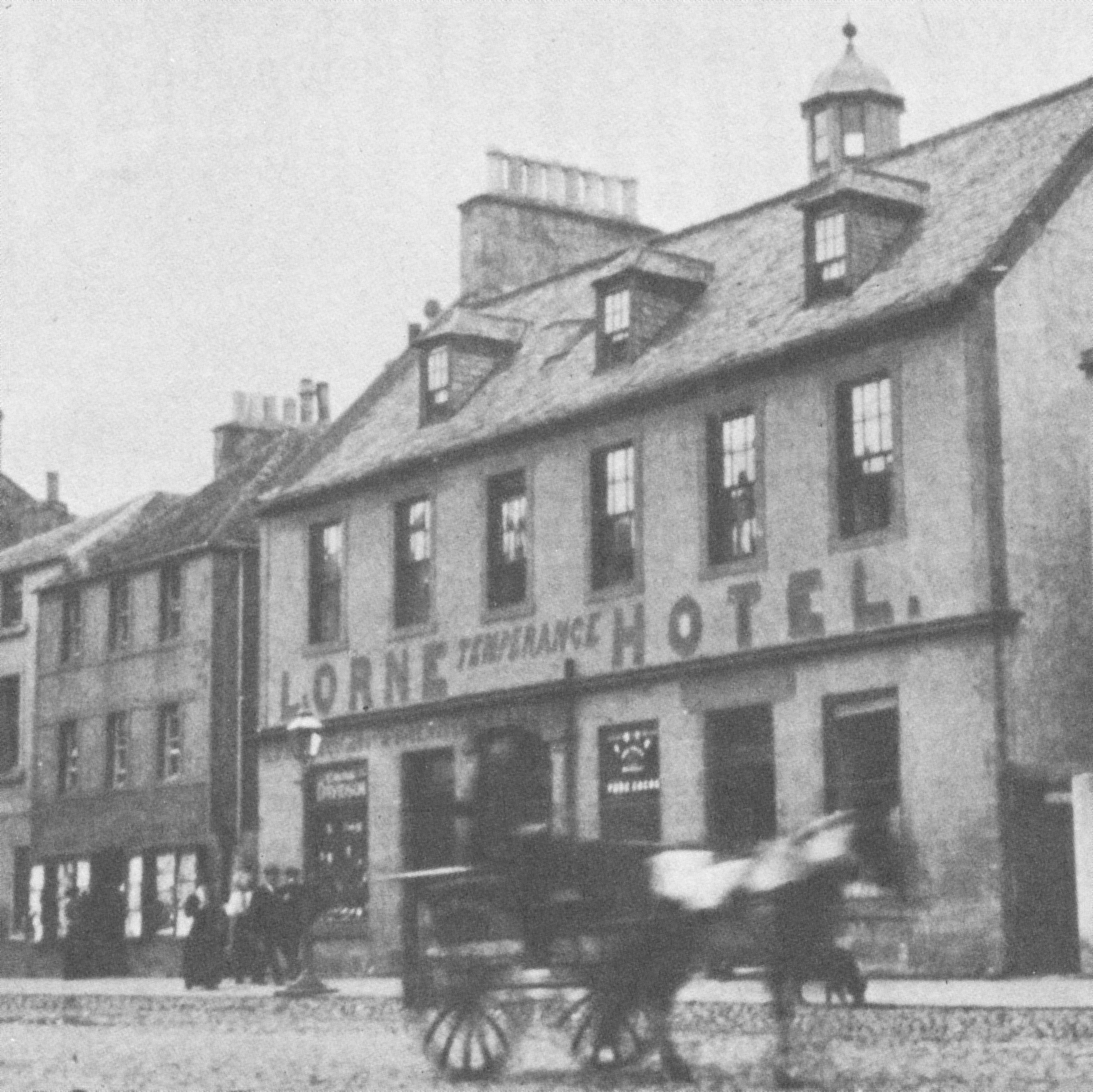
Muir was born in the small house at left. His father bought the adjacent building in 1842, and made it the family home.

John Muir was born in Dunbar, Scotland, in a three-story stone building now preserved as a museum. He was the third of eight children of Daniel Muir and Ann Gilrye; their other children were Margaret, Sarah, David, Daniel, Ann and Mary (twins), and the American-born Joanna. His earliest recollections were of taking short walks with his grandfather when he was three. In his autobiography, he described his boyhood pursuits, which included fighting, either by re-enacting romantic battles from the Wars of Scottish Independence or just wrestling on the playground, and hunting for birds' nests (ostensibly to one-up his fellows as they compared notes on who knew where the most were located). Author Amy Marquis notes that he began his "love affair" with nature while young, and implies that it may have been in reaction to his strict religious upbringing. "His father believed that anything that distracted from Bible studies was frivolous and punishable." But the young Muir was a "restless spirit" and especially "prone to lashings". As a young boy, Muir became fascinated with the East Lothian landscape, and spent a lot of time wandering the local coastline and countryside. It was during this time that he became interested in natural history and the works of Scottish naturalist Alexander Wilson.

Although he spent the majority of his life in America, Muir never forgot his roots in Scotland. He held a strong connection with his birthplace and Scottish identity throughout his life and was frequently heard talking about his childhood spent amid the East Lothian countryside. He greatly admired the works of Thomas Carlyle and poetry of Robert Burns; he was known to carry a collection of poems by Burns during his travels through the American wilderness. He returned to Scotland on a trip in 1893, where he met one of his Dunbar schoolmates and visited the places of his youth that were etched in his memory. He never lost his Scottish accent since he was already 11 years old when he and his family emigrated to America.

=== Immigration to America ===
In 1849, Muir's family immigrated to the United States, starting a farm near Portage, Wisconsin, called Fountain Lake Farm. It has been designated a National Historic Landmark. Stephen Fox recounts that Muir's father found the Church of Scotland insufficiently strict in faith and practice, leading to their immigration and joining a congregation of the Campbellite Restoration Movement, called the Disciples of Christ. By the age of 11, the young Muir had learned to recite "by heart and by sore flesh" all of the New Testament and most of the Old Testament. In maturity, while remaining a deeply spiritual man, Muir may have changed his orthodox beliefs. He wrote, "I never tried to abandon creeds or code of civilization; they went away of their own accord ... without leaving any consciousness of loss." Elsewhere in his writings, he described the conventional image of a Creator "as purely a manufactured article as any puppet of a half-penny theater". As part of his spiritual evolution, Muir and his two siblings were re-baptized in what is now Mulhern Lake.

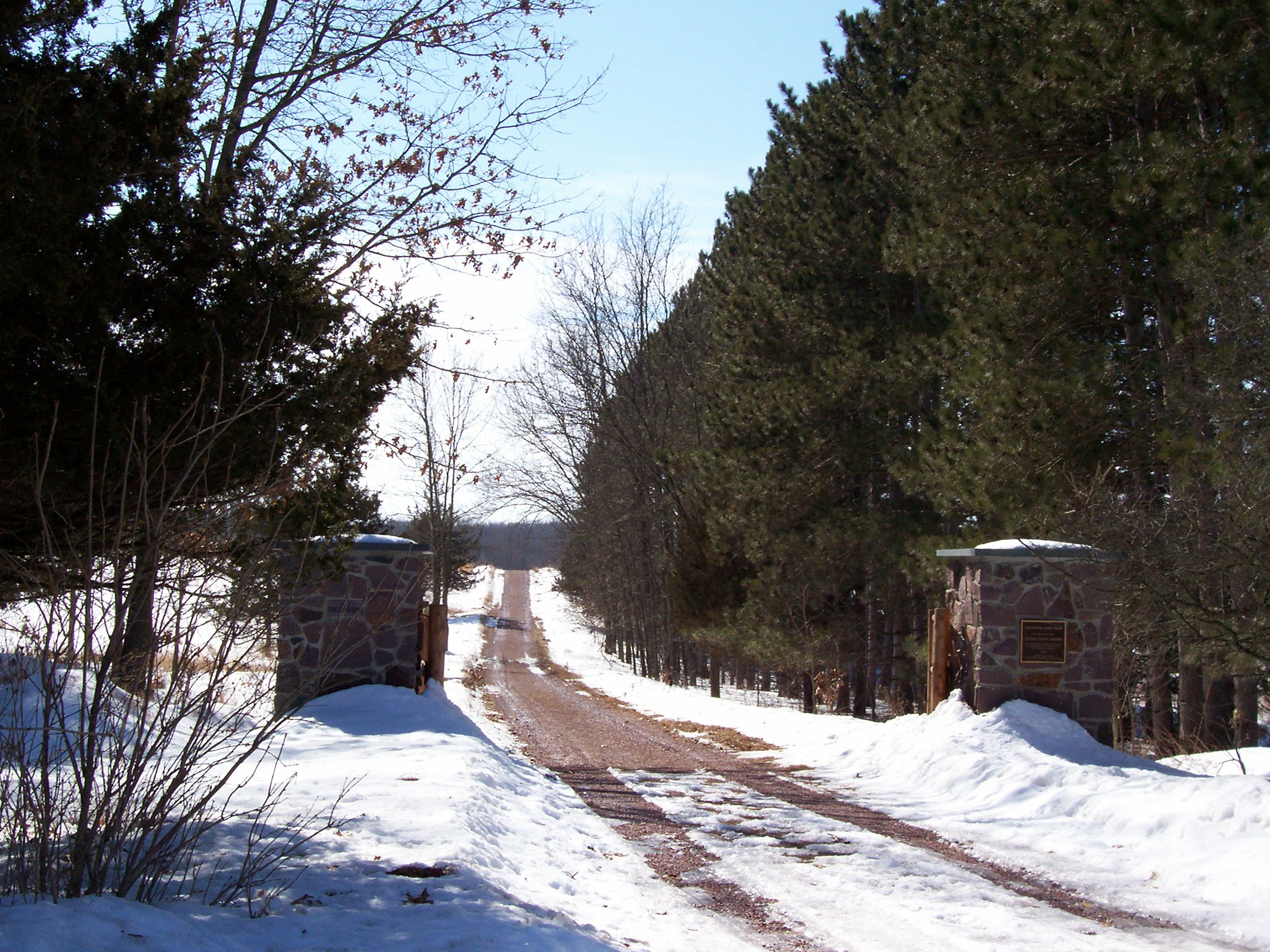
Entrance to Fountain Lake Farm near Portage, Wisconsin

When he was 22 years old, Muir enrolled at the University of Wisconsin–Madison, paying his own way for several years. There, under a towering black locust tree beside North Hall, Muir took his first botany lesson. A fellow student plucked a flower from the tree and used it to explain how the grand locust is a member of the pea family, related to the straggling pea plant. Fifty years later, the naturalist Muir described the day in his autobiography. "This fine lesson charmed me and sent me flying to the woods and meadows in wild enthusiasm". As a freshman, Muir studied chemistry with Professor Ezra Carr and his wife Jeanne; they became lifelong friends and Muir developed a lasting interest in chemistry and the sciences. Muir took an eclectic approach to his studies, attending classes for two years but never being listed higher than a first-year student due to his unusual selection of courses. Records showed his class status as "irregular gent" and, even though he never graduated, he learned enough geology and botany to inform his later wanderings.

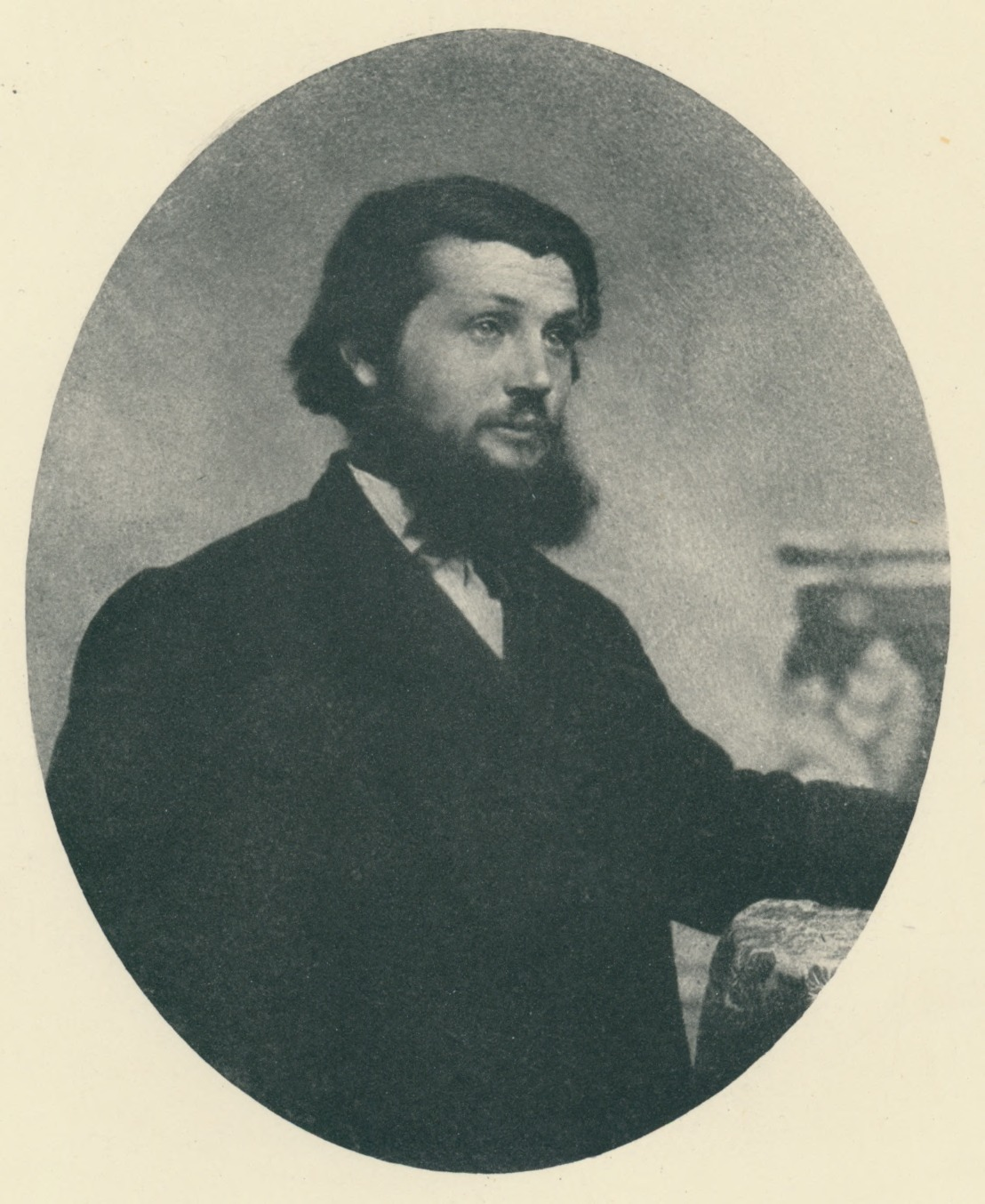
Muir c. 1863

In 1863, his brother Daniel left Wisconsin and moved to Southern Ontario (then known as Canada West in the United Canadas), to avoid the draft during the US Civil War. Muir left school and travelled to the same region in 1864, and spent the spring, summer, and fall exploring the woods and swamps, and collecting plants around the southern reaches of Lake Huron's Georgian Bay. Muir hiked along the Niagara Escarpment, including much of today's Bruce Trail. With his money running low and winter coming, he reunited with his brother Daniel near Meaford, Ontario, who persuaded him to work with him at the sawmill and rake factory of William Trout and Charles Jay. Muir lived with the Trout family in an area called Trout Hollow, south of Meaford, on the Bighead River. While there, he continued "botanizing", exploring the escarpment and bogs, collecting and cataloging plants. One source appears to indicate he worked at the mill/factory until the summer of 1865, while another says he stayed on at Trout Hollow until after a fire burned it down in February 1866.

In March 1866, Muir returned to the United States, settling in Indianapolis to work in a wagon wheel factory. He proved valuable to his employers because of his inventiveness in improving the machines and processes; he was promoted to supervisor, being paid $25 per week. In early-March 1867, an accident changed the course of his life: a tool he was using slipped and struck him in the eye. The file slipped and cut the cornea in his right eye and then his left eye sympathetically failed. He was confined to a darkened room for six weeks to regain his sight, worried about whether he would end up blind. When he regained his sight, "he saw the world—and his purpose—in a new light". Muir later wrote, "This affliction has driven me to the sweet fields. God has to nearly kill us sometimes, to teach us lessons". From that point on, he determined to "be true to [himself]" and follow his dream of exploration and study of plants.

In September 1867, Muir undertook a walk of about 1,000 miles (1,600 km) from Kentucky to Florida, which he recounted in his book A Thousand-Mile Walk to the Gulf. He had no specific route chosen, except to go by the "wildest, leafiest, and least trodden way I could find". When Muir arrived at Cedar Key, he began working for Richard Hodgson at Hodgson's sawmill. However, three days after accepting the job at Hodgson's, Muir almost died of a malarial sickness. After spending three months in an oft delirious state, Muir's condition improved such that he was able to move about the Hodgson's house and look outside. Due to their unending kindness in caring for his life, Muir stated that he "doubtless owe my life" to the Hodgsons.

One evening in early January 1868, Muir climbed onto the Hodgson house roof to watch the sunset. He saw a ship, the Island Belle, and learned it would soon be sailing for Cuba. Muir boarded the ship, and while in Havana, he spent his hours studying shells and flowers and visiting the botanical garden in the city. Afterwards, he sailed to New York City and booked passage to California. In 1878, Muir served as a guide and artist for the United States Coast and Geodetic Survey on the survey of the 39th parallel across the Great Basin of Nevada and Utah.

== Explorer of nature ==
=== California ===
==== Experiencing Yosemite ====
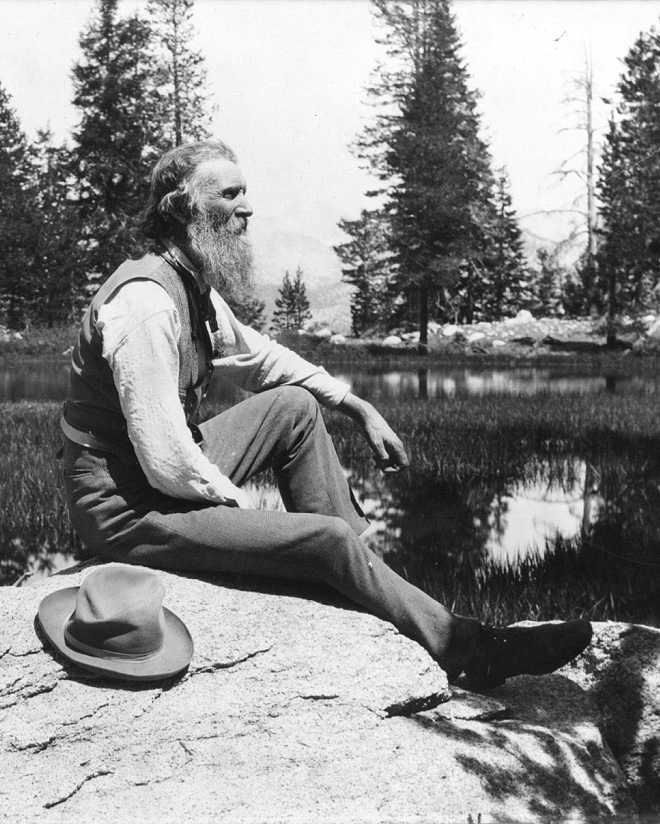
Muir c. 1902

Finally settling in San Francisco, Muir immediately left for a week-long visit to Yosemite, a place he had only read about. Seeing it for the first time, Muir notes that "He was overwhelmed by the landscape, scrambling down steep cliff faces to get a closer look at the waterfalls, whooping and howling at the vistas, jumping tirelessly from flower to flower." He later returned to Yosemite and worked as a shepherd for a season. He climbed a number of mountains, including Cathedral Peak and Mount Dana, and hiked an old trail down Bloody Canyon to Mono Lake.

Muir built a small cabin along Yosemite Creek, designing it so that a section of the stream flowed through a corner of the room so he could enjoy the sound of running water. He lived in the cabin for two years and wrote about this period in his book First Summer in the Sierra (1911). Muir's biographer, Frederick Turner, notes Muir's journal entry upon first visiting the valley and writes that his description "blazes from the page with the authentic force of a conversion experience".

==== Friendships ====
During these years in Yosemite, Muir was unmarried, often unemployed, with no prospects for a career, and had "periods of anguish", writes naturalist author John Tallmadge. In 1880, he married Louisa Strentzel. He went into business for 10 years with his father-in-law managing the orchards on the family 2,600 acre farm in Martinez, California. Muir and Strentzel had two daughters, Wanda Muir Hanna and Helen Muir Funk. He was sustained by the natural environment and by reading the essays of naturalist author Ralph Waldo Emerson, who wrote about the very life that Muir was then living. On excursions into the back country of Yosemite, he traveled alone, carrying "only a tin cup, a handful of tea, a loaf of bread, and a copy of Emerson". He usually spent his evenings sitting by a campfire in his overcoat, reading Emerson under the stars. As the years passed, he became a "fixture in the valley", respected for his knowledge of natural history, his skill as a guide, and his vivid storytelling. Visitors to the valley often included scientists, artists, and celebrities, many of whom made a point of meeting with Muir.

During his time at the University of Wisconsin, Muir took classes under Charles H. Allen, with whom he became lifelong friends, sharing a love of natural sciences. Allen would move to California in 1872 and become the principal of the California State Normal School (now San Jose State University), Muir gave several lectures at the normal school, and Allen joined Muir in several mountain hikes.

Muir maintained a close friendship for 38 years with William Keith, a California landscape painter. They were both born the same year in Scotland and shared a love for the mountains of California.

In 1871, after Muir had lived in Yosemite for three years, Emerson, with several friends and family, arrived in Yosemite during a tour of the Western United States. The two men met, and according to Tallmadge, "Emerson was delighted to find at the end of his career the prophet-naturalist he had called for so long ago ... And for Muir, Emerson's visit came like a laying on of hands." Emerson spent one day with Muir, and he offered him a teaching position at Harvard, which Muir declined. Muir later wrote, "I never for a moment thought of giving up God's big show for a mere profship!"

Muir also spent time with photographer Carleton Watkins and studied his photographs of Yosemite.

==== Geological studies and theories ====
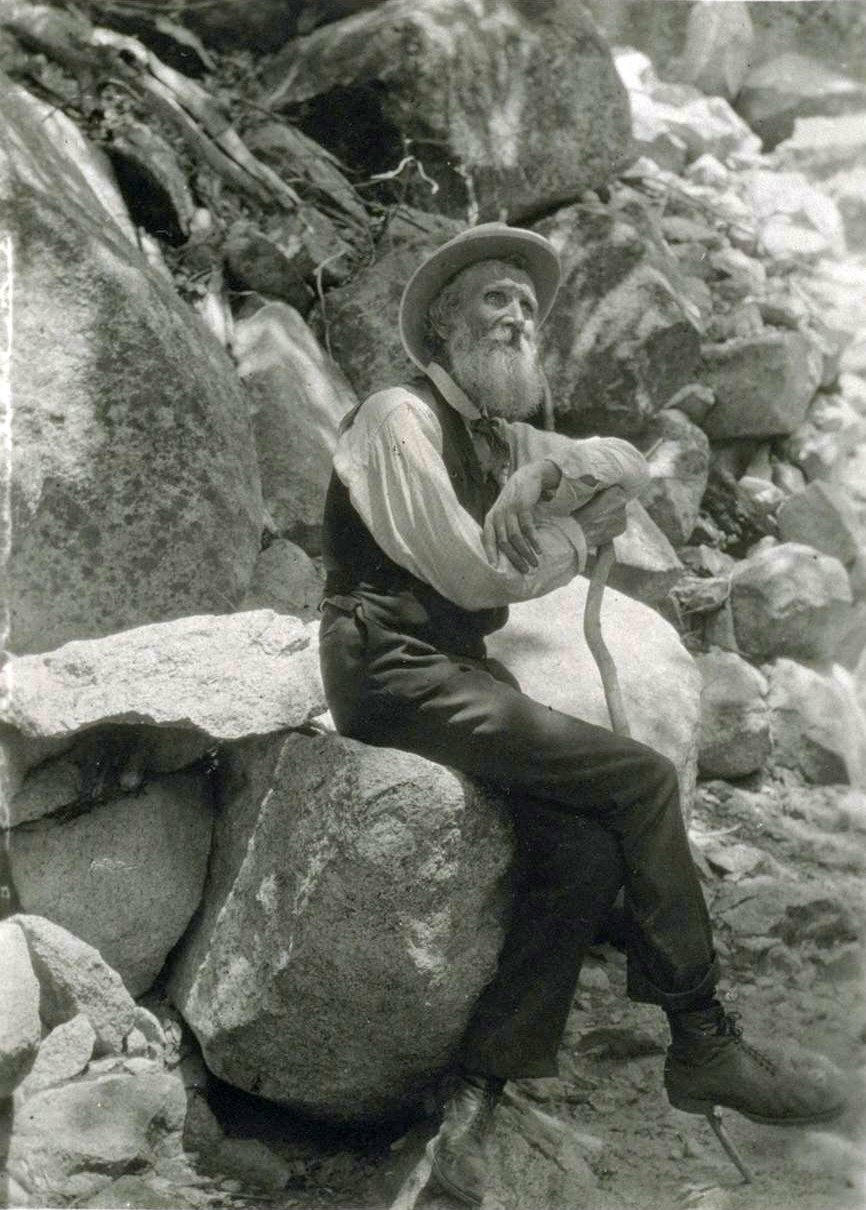
Muir in 1907

Pursuit of his love of science, especially geology, often occupied his free time. Muir soon became convinced that glaciers had sculpted many of the features of the Yosemite Valley and surrounding area. This notion was in strong contradiction to the accepted contemporary theory, promulgated by Josiah Whitney (head of the California Geological Survey), which attributed the formation of the valley to a catastrophic earthquake. As Muir's ideas spread, Whitney tried to discredit Muir by branding him as an amateur. But Louis Agassiz, the premier geologist of the day, saw merit in Muir's ideas and lauded him as "the first man I have ever found who has any adequate conception of glacial action". In 1871, Muir discovered an active alpine glacier below Merced Peak, which helped his theories gain acceptance.

A large earthquake centered near Lone Pine in Owens Valley strongly shook occupants of Yosemite Valley in March 1872. The quake woke Muir in the early morning, and he ran out of his cabin "both glad and frightened", exclaiming, "A noble earthquake!" Other valley settlers, who believed Whitney's ideas, feared that the quake was a prelude to a cataclysmic deepening of the valley. Muir had no such fear and promptly made a moonlit survey of new talus piles created by earthquake-triggered rockslides. This event led more people to believe in Muir's ideas about the formation of the valley.

==== Botanical studies ====
In addition to his geologic studies, Muir also investigated the plant life of the Yosemite area. In 1873 and 1874, he made field studies along the western flank of the Sierra on the distribution and ecology of isolated groves of Giant Sequoia. In 1876, the American Association for the Advancement of Science published Muir's paper on the subject.

=== Pacific Northwest ===
Between 1879 and 1899, Muir made seven trips to Alaska, as far as Unalaska and Barrow. Muir, Mr. Young (Fort Wrangell missionary) and a group of Native American Guides first traveled to Alaska in 1879 and were the first Euro-Americans to explore Glacier Bay. Muir Glacier was later named after him. He traveled into British Columbia a third of the way up the Stikine River, likening its Grand Canyon to "a Yosemite that was a hundred miles long". Muir recorded over 300 glaciers along the river's course.

He returned for further explorations in southeast Alaska in 1880 and in 1881 was with the party that landed on Wrangel Island on the USS Corwin and claimed that island for the United States. He documented this experience in journal entries and newspaper articles—later compiled and edited into his book The Cruise of the Corwin. In 1888 after seven years of managing the Strentzel fruit ranch in Alhambra Valley, California, his health began to suffer. He returned to the hills to recover, climbing Mount Rainier in Washington and writing Ascent of Mount Rainier.

== Activism ==
=== Preservation efforts ===
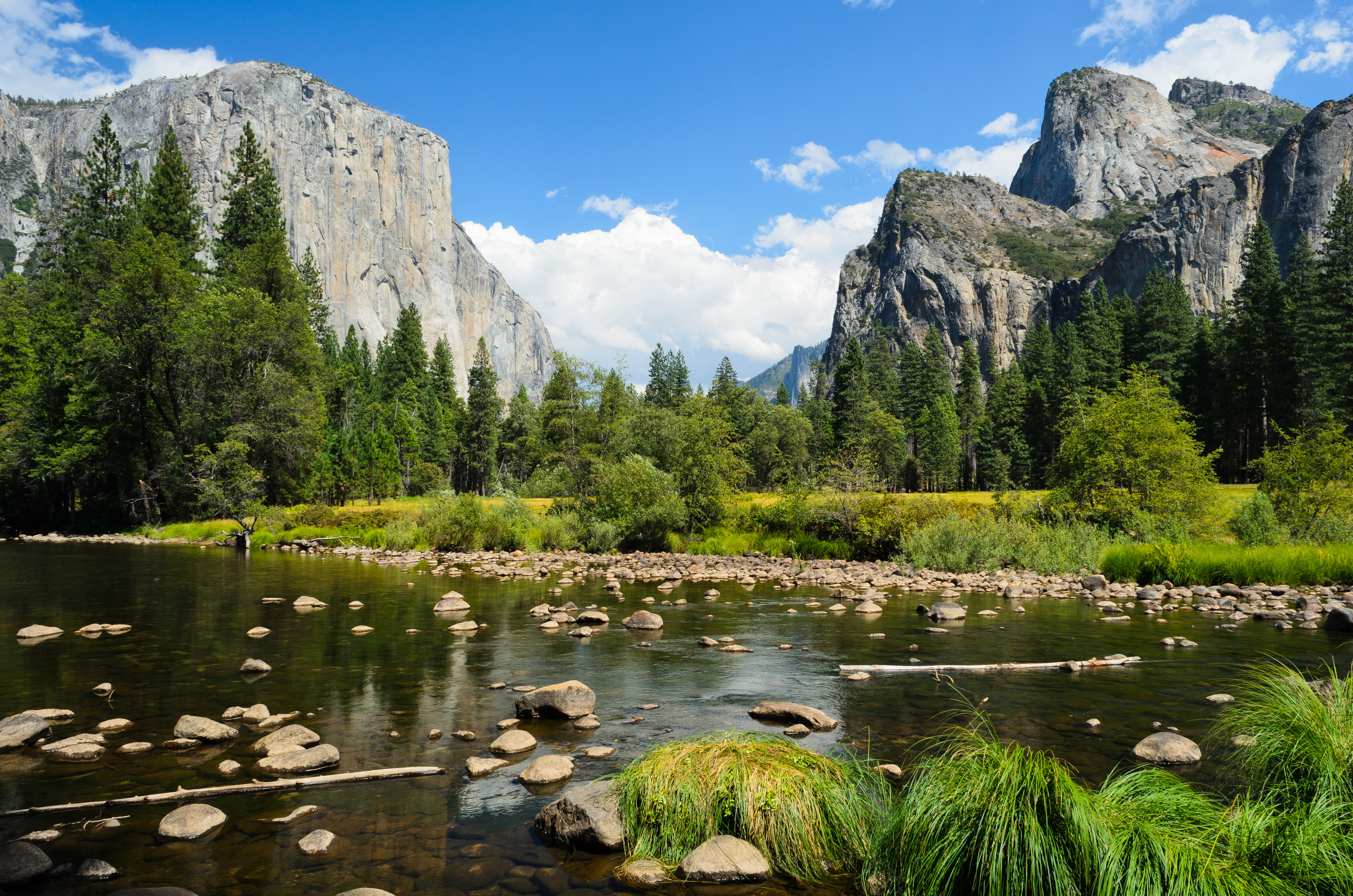
Yosemite Valley and the Merced River

==== Establishing Yosemite National Park ====
Muir threw himself into the preservationist role with great vigor. He envisioned the Yosemite area and the Sierra as pristine lands. He thought the greatest threat to the Yosemite area and the Sierra was domesticated livestock—especially domestic sheep, which he referred to as "hoofed locusts". In June 1889, the influential associate editor of The Century magazine, Robert Underwood Johnson, camped with Muir in Tuolumne Meadows and saw firsthand the damage a large flock of sheep had done to the grassland. Johnson agreed to publish any article Muir wrote on the subject of excluding livestock from the Sierra high country. He also agreed to use his influence to introduce a bill to Congress to make the Yosemite area into a national park, modeled after Yellowstone National Park.

On September 30, 1890, the US Congress passed a bill that essentially followed recommendations that Muir had suggested in two Century articles, "The Treasures of the Yosemite" and "Features of the Proposed National Park", both published in 1890. But to Muir's dismay, the bill left Yosemite Valley under state control, as it had been since the 1860s.—

=== Co-founding the Sierra Club ===
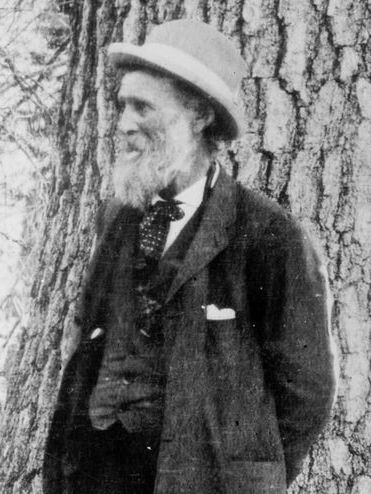
Muir in the forest

In early 1892, Professor Henry Senger, a philologist at the University of California, Berkeley, contacted Muir with the idea of forming a local 'alpine club' for mountain lovers. Senger and San Francisco attorney Warren Olney sent out invitations "for the purpose of forming a 'Sierra Club'. Mr. John Muir will preside". On May 28, 1892, the first meeting of the Sierra Club was held to write articles of incorporation. One week later Muir was elected president, Warren Olney was elected vice-president, and a board of directors was chosen that included David Starr Jordan, president of the new Stanford University. Muir remained president until his death 22 years later.

The Sierra Club immediately opposed efforts to reduce Yosemite National Park by half, and began holding educational and scientific meetings. At one meeting in the fall of 1895 that included Muir, Joseph LeConte, and William R. Dudley, the Sierra Club discussed the idea of establishing 'national forest reservations', which were later called National Forests. The Sierra Club was active in the successful campaign to transfer Yosemite National Park from state to federal control in 1906. The fight to preserve Hetch Hetchy Valley was also taken up by the Sierra Club, with some prominent San Francisco members opposing the fight. Eventually a vote was held that overwhelmingly put the Sierra Club behind the opposition to Hetch Hetchy Dam.

=== Preservation vs conservation ===
In July 1896, Muir became associated with Gifford Pinchot, a national leader in the conservation movement. Pinchot was the first head of the United States Forest Service and a leading spokesman for the sustainable use of natural resources for the benefit of the people. His views eventually clashed with Muir's and highlighted two diverging views of the use of the country's natural resources. Pinchot saw conservation as a means of managing the nation's natural resources for long-term sustainable commercial use. As a professional forester, his view was that "forestry is tree farming", without destroying the long-term viability of the forests. Muir valued nature for its spiritual and transcendental qualities. In one essay about the National Parks, he referred to them as "places for rest, inspiration, and prayers". He often encouraged city dwellers to experience nature for its spiritual nourishment. Both men opposed reckless exploitation of natural resources, including clear-cutting of forests. Even Muir acknowledged the need for timber and the forests to provide it, but Pinchot's view of wilderness management was more resource-oriented.

Their friendship ended late in the summer of 1897 when Pinchot released a statement to a Seattle newspaper supporting sheep grazing in forest reserves. Muir confronted Pinchot and demanded an explanation. When Pinchot reiterated his position, Muir told him: "I don't want any thing more to do with you". This philosophical divide soon expanded and split the conservation movement into two camps: the "preservationists", led by Muir; and Pinchot's camp, who used the term "conservation". The two men debated their positions in popular magazines, such as Outlook, Harper's Weekly, Atlantic Monthly, World's Work, and Century. Their contrasting views were highlighted again when the United States was deciding whether to dam Hetch Hetchy Valley. Pinchot favored damming the valley as "the highest possible use which could be made of it". In contrast, Muir proclaimed, "Dam Hetch Hetchy! As well dam for water-tanks the people's cathedrals and churches, for no holier temple has ever been consecrated by the hearts of man".

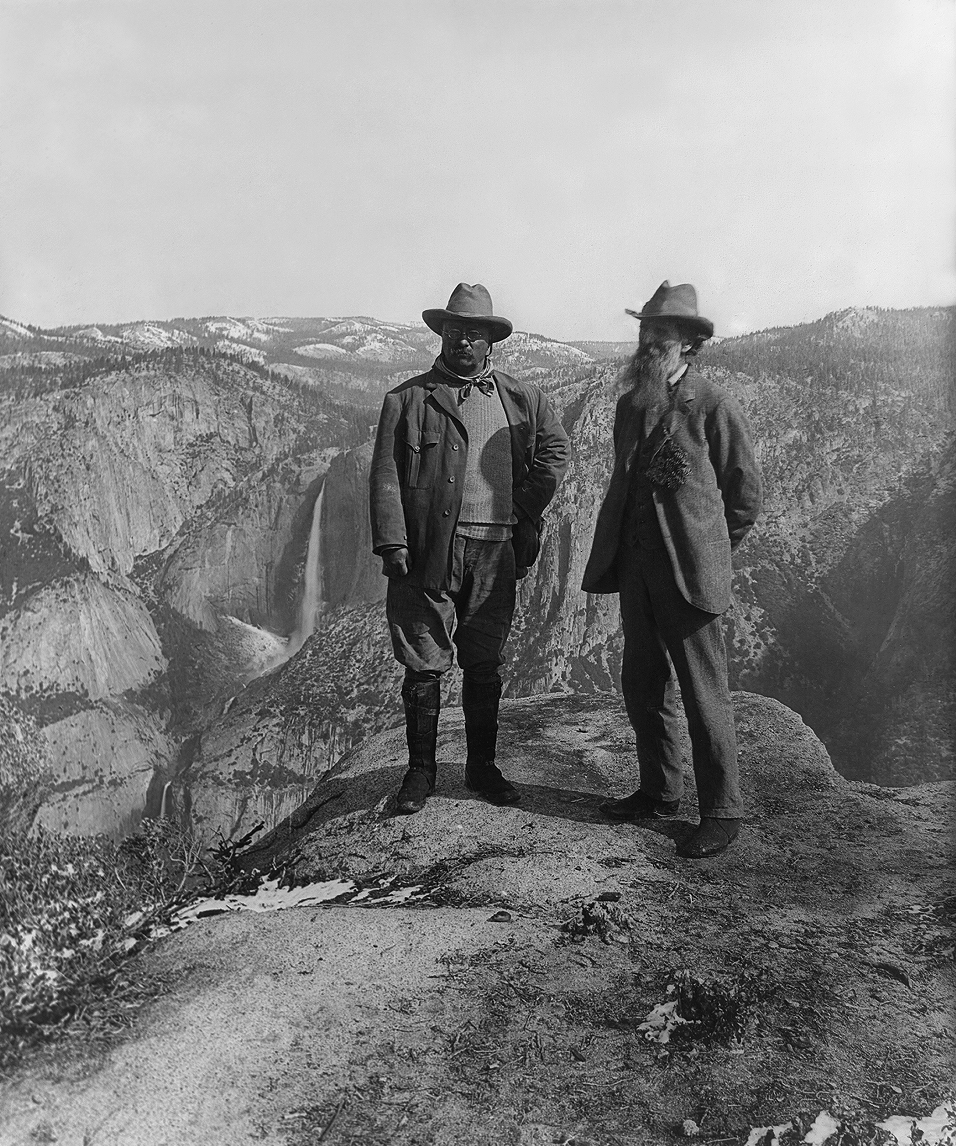
Theodore Roosevelt and Muir, 1903

In 1899, Muir accompanied railroad executive E. H. Harriman and esteemed scientists on the famous exploratory voyage along the Alaska coast aboard the luxuriously refitted 250-foot (76 m) steamer, the George W. Elder. He later relied on his friendship with Harriman to pressure Congress to pass conservation legislation.

In 1903, President Theodore Roosevelt accompanied Muir on a visit to Yosemite. Muir joined Roosevelt in Oakland, California, for the train trip to Raymond. The presidential entourage then traveled by stagecoach into the park. While traveling to the park, Muir told the president about state mismanagement of the valley and rampant exploitation of the valley's resources. Even before they entered the park, he was able to convince Roosevelt that the best way to protect the valley was through federal control and management.

After entering the park and seeing the magnificent splendor of the valley, the president asked Muir to show him the real Yosemite. Muir and Roosevelt set off largely by themselves and camped in the back country. The duo talked late into the night, slept in the brisk open air of Glacier Point, and were dusted by a fresh snowfall in the morning. It was a night Roosevelt never forgot. He later told a crowd, "Lying out at night under those giant Sequoias was like lying in a temple built by no hand of man, a temple grander than any human architect could by any possibility build." Muir, too, cherished the camping trip. "Camping with the President was a remarkable experience", he wrote. "I fairly fell in love with him".

Muir then increased efforts by the Sierra Club to consolidate park management. In 1906 Congress transferred the Mariposa Grove and Yosemite Valley to the park.

== Nature writer ==
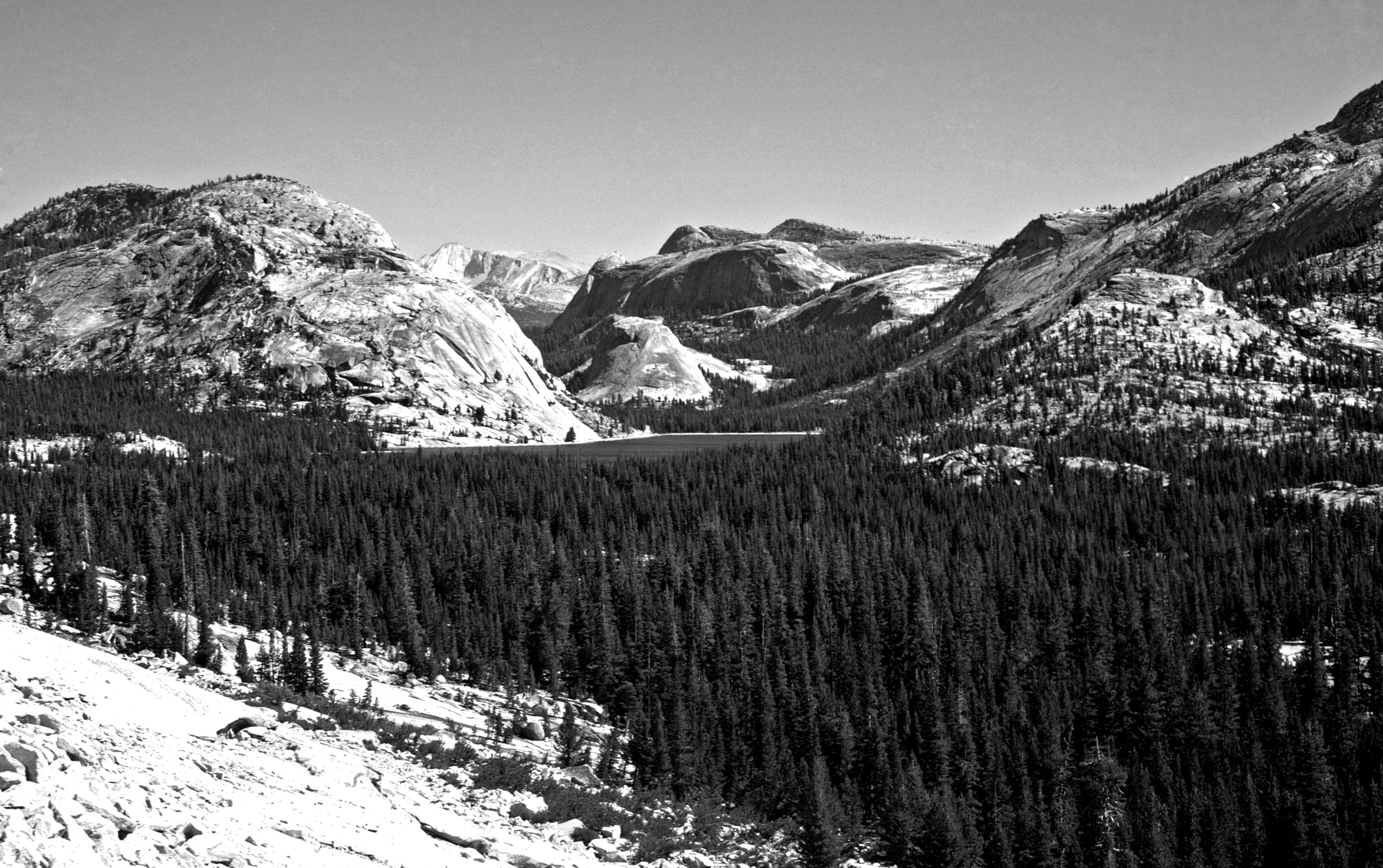
Lake Tenaya, Yosemite

In his life, Muir published six volumes of writings, all describing explorations of natural settings. Four additional books were published posthumously. Several books were subsequently published that collected essays and articles from various sources. Miller writes that what was most important about his writings was not their quantity, but their "quality". He notes that they have had a "lasting effect on American culture in helping to create the desire and will to protect and preserve wild and natural environments".

His first appearance in print was by accident, writes his biographer Rod Miller; a person he did not know submitted, without his permission or awareness, a personal letter to his friend Jeanne Carr, describing Calypso borealis, a rare flower he had encountered. The piece was published anonymously, identified as having been written by an "inspired pilgrim". Throughout his many years as a nature writer, Muir frequently rewrote and expanded on earlier writings from his journals, as well as articles published in magazines. He often compiled and organized such earlier writings as collections of essays or included them as part of narrative books.

=== Jeanne Carr: friend and mentor ===
Muir's friendship with Jeanne Carr had a lifelong influence on his career as a naturalist and writer. They first met in the fall of 1860, when, at age 22, he entered a number of his homemade inventions in the Wisconsin State Agricultural Society Fair. Carr, a fair assistant, was asked by fair officials to review Muir's exhibits to see if they had merit. She thought they did and "saw in his entries evidence of genius worthy of special recognition", notes Miller. As a result, Muir received a diploma and a monetary award for his handmade clocks and thermometer. During the next three years while a student at the University of Wisconsin, he was befriended by Carr and her husband, Ezra, a professor at the same university. According to Muir biographer Bonnie Johanna Gisel, the Carrs recognized his "pure mind, unsophisticated nature, inherent curiosity, scholarly acumen, and independent thought". Jeanne Carr, 35 years of age, especially appreciated his youthful individuality, along with his acceptance of "religious truths" that were much like her own.

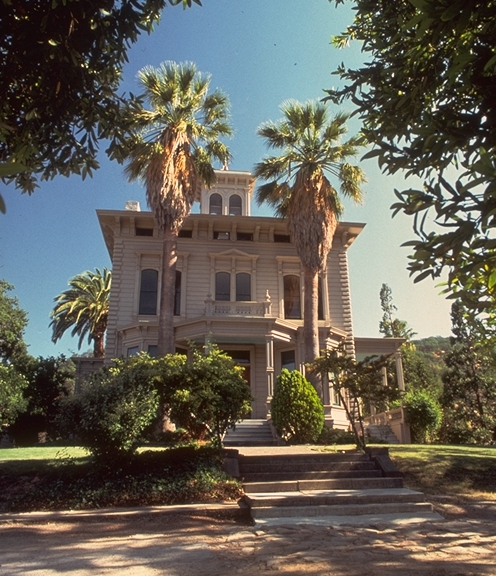
The Muirs' home in Martinez, California, is a US National Historic Site

Muir was often invited to the Carrs' home; he shared Jeanne's love of plants. In 1864, he left Wisconsin to begin exploring the Canadian wilderness and, while there, began corresponding with her about his activities. Carr wrote Muir in return and encouraged him in his explorations and writings, eventually having an important influence over his personal goals. At one point she asked Muir to read a book she felt would influence his thinking, Lamartine's The Stonemason of Saint Point. It was the story of a man whose life she hoped would "metabolize in Muir", writes Gisel, and "was a projection of the life she envisioned for him". According to Gisel, the story was about a "poor man with a pure heart", who found in nature "divine lessons and saw all of God's creatures interconnected".

After Muir returned to the United States, he spent the next four years exploring Yosemite, while at the same time writing articles for publication. During those years, Muir and Carr continued corresponding. She sent many of her friends to Yosemite to meet Muir and "to hear him preach the gospel of the mountains", writes Gisel. The most notable was naturalist and author Ralph Waldo Emerson. The importance of Carr, who continually gave Muir reassurance and inspiration, "cannot be overestimated", adds Gisel. It was "through his letters to her that he developed a voice and purpose". She also tried to promote Muir's writings by submitting his letters to a monthly magazine for publication. Muir came to trust Carr as his "spiritual mother", and they remained friends for 30 years. In one letter she wrote to Muir while he was living in Yosemite, she tried to keep him from despairing as to his purpose in life.

The value of their friendship was first disclosed by a friend of Carr's, clergyman and writer G. Wharton James. After obtaining copies of their private letters from Carr, and despite pleadings from Muir to return them, he instead published articles about their friendship, using those letters as a primary source. In one such article, his focus was Muir's debt to Carr, stating that she was his "guiding star" who "led him into the noble paths of life, and then kept him there".

=== John Charles Van Dyke and Dix Strong Van Dyke ===
John Charles Van Dyke was an author and Professor of Art at Rutgers College (now Rutgers, State University of New Jersey). His nephew Dix Strong Van Dyke had gone to Daggett, California to seek his fortune. Like his uncle, Dix was an author, who wrote Daggett: Life in a Mojave Frontier Town (Creating the North American Landscape). John Muir found his way to Daggett and had many conversations with the uncle and nephew Van Dyke at the Dix ranch. This likely had an effect on his writings. His daughter Helen married Frank Buel and lived in Daggett.

=== Writing becomes his work ===
Muir's friend, zoologist Henry Fairfield Osborn, writes that Muir's style of writing did not come to him easily, but only with intense effort. "Daily he rose at 4:30 o'clock, and after a simple cup of coffee labored incessantly. ... he groans over his labors, he writes and rewrites and interpolates". Osborn notes that he preferred using the simplest English language, and therefore admired above all the writings of Carlyle, Emerson and Thoreau. "He is a very firm believer in Thoreau and starts by reading deeply of this author". His secretary, Marion Randall Parsons, also noted that "composition was always slow and laborious for him. ... Each sentence, each phrase, each word, underwent his critical scrutiny, not once but twenty times before he was satisfied to let it stand". Muir often told her, "This business of writing books is a long, tiresome, endless job".

Miller speculates that Muir recycled his earlier writings partly due to his "dislike of the writing process". He adds that Muir "did not enjoy the work, finding it difficult and tedious". He was generally unsatisfied with the finished result, finding prose "a weak instrument for the reality he wished to convey". However, he was prodded by friends and his wife to keep writing and as a result of their influence he kept at it, although never satisfied. Muir wrote in 1872, "No amount of word-making will ever make a single soul to 'know' these mountains. One day's exposure to mountains is better than a cartload of books". In one of his essays, he gave an example of the deficiencies of writing versus experiencing nature.

== Philosophical beliefs ==
=== Nature and theology ===
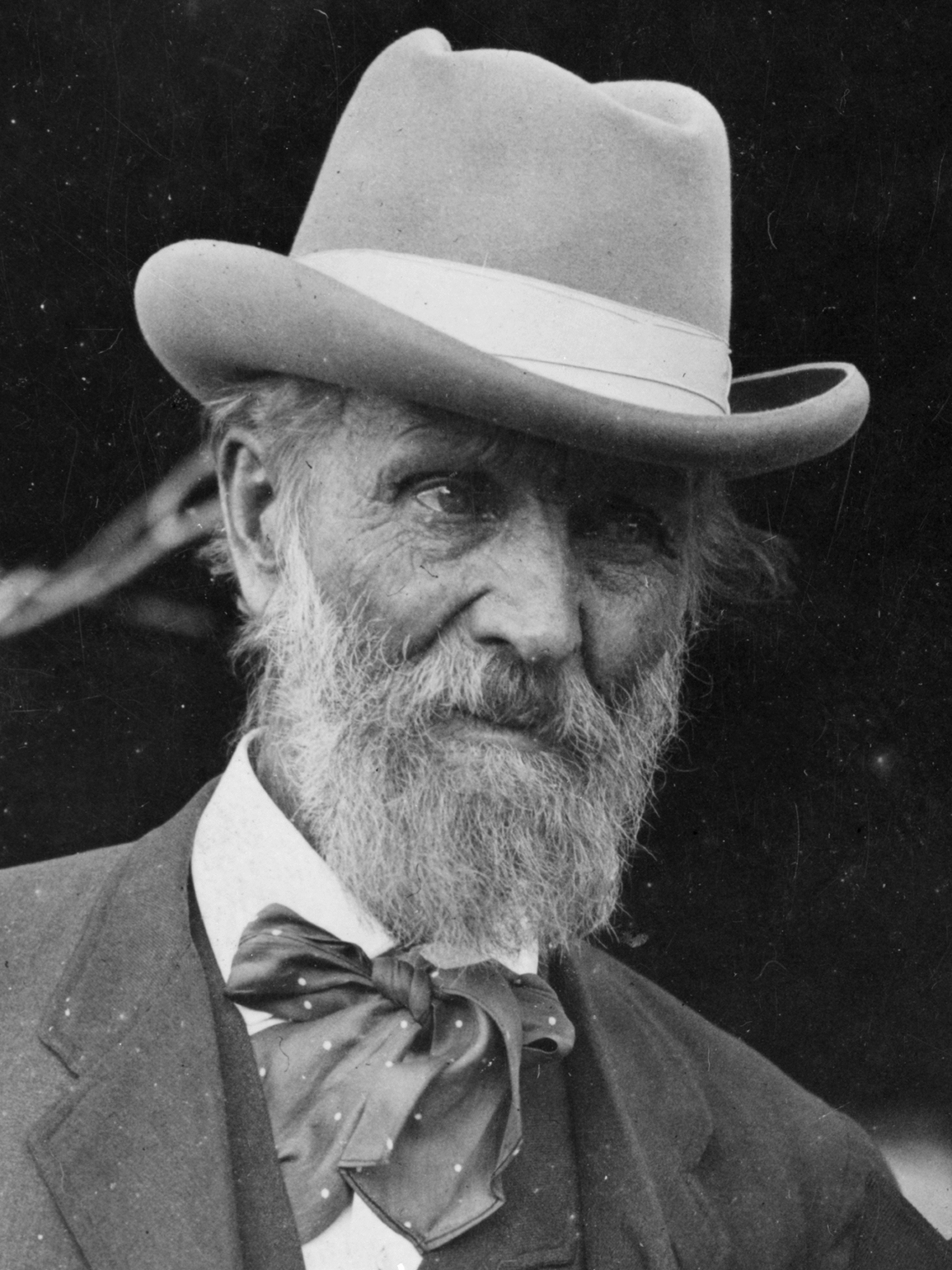
Muir at age 73 on March 29, 1912

Muir believed that to discover truth, he must turn to what he believed were the most accurate sources. In his book, The Story of My Boyhood and Youth (1913), he writes that during his childhood, his father made him read the Bible every day. Muir eventually memorized three-quarters of the Old Testament and all of the New Testament. Muir's father read Josephus's War of the Jews to understand the culture of first-century Judea, as it was written by an eyewitness, and illuminated the culture during the period of the New Testament. But as Muir became attached to the American natural landscapes he explored, Williams notes that he began to see another "primary source for understanding God: the Book of Nature". According to Williams, in nature, especially in the wilderness, Muir was able to study the plants and animals in an environment that he believed "came straight from the hand of God, uncorrupted by civilization and domestication". As Tallmadge notes, Muir's belief in this "Book of Nature" compelled him to tell the story of "this creation in words any reader could understand". As a result, his writings were to become "prophecy, for [they] sought to change our angle of vision".

Williams notes that Muir's philosophy and world view rotated around his perceived dichotomy between civilization and nature. From this developed his core belief that "wild is superior". His nature writings became a "synthesis of natural theology" with scripture that helped him understand the origins of the natural world. According to Williams, philosophers and theologians such as Thomas Dick suggested that the "best place to discover the true attributes of deity was in Nature". He came to believe that God was always active in the creation of life and thereby kept the natural order of the world. As a result, Muir "styled himself as a John the Baptist", adds Williams, "whose duty was to immerse in 'mountain baptism' everyone he could". Williams concludes that Muir saw nature as a great teacher, "revealing the mind of God", and this belief became the central theme of his later journeys and the "subtext" of his nature writing.

During his career as writer and while living in the mountains, Muir continued to experience the "presence of the divine in nature", writes Holmes. His personal letters also conveyed these feelings of ecstasy. Historian Catherine Albanese stated that in one of his letters, "Muir's eucharist made Thoreau's feast on wood-chuck and huckleberry seem almost anemic". Muir was extremely fond of Thoreau and was probably influenced more by him than even Emerson. Muir often referred to himself as a "disciple" of Thoreau.

=== Sensory perceptions and light ===
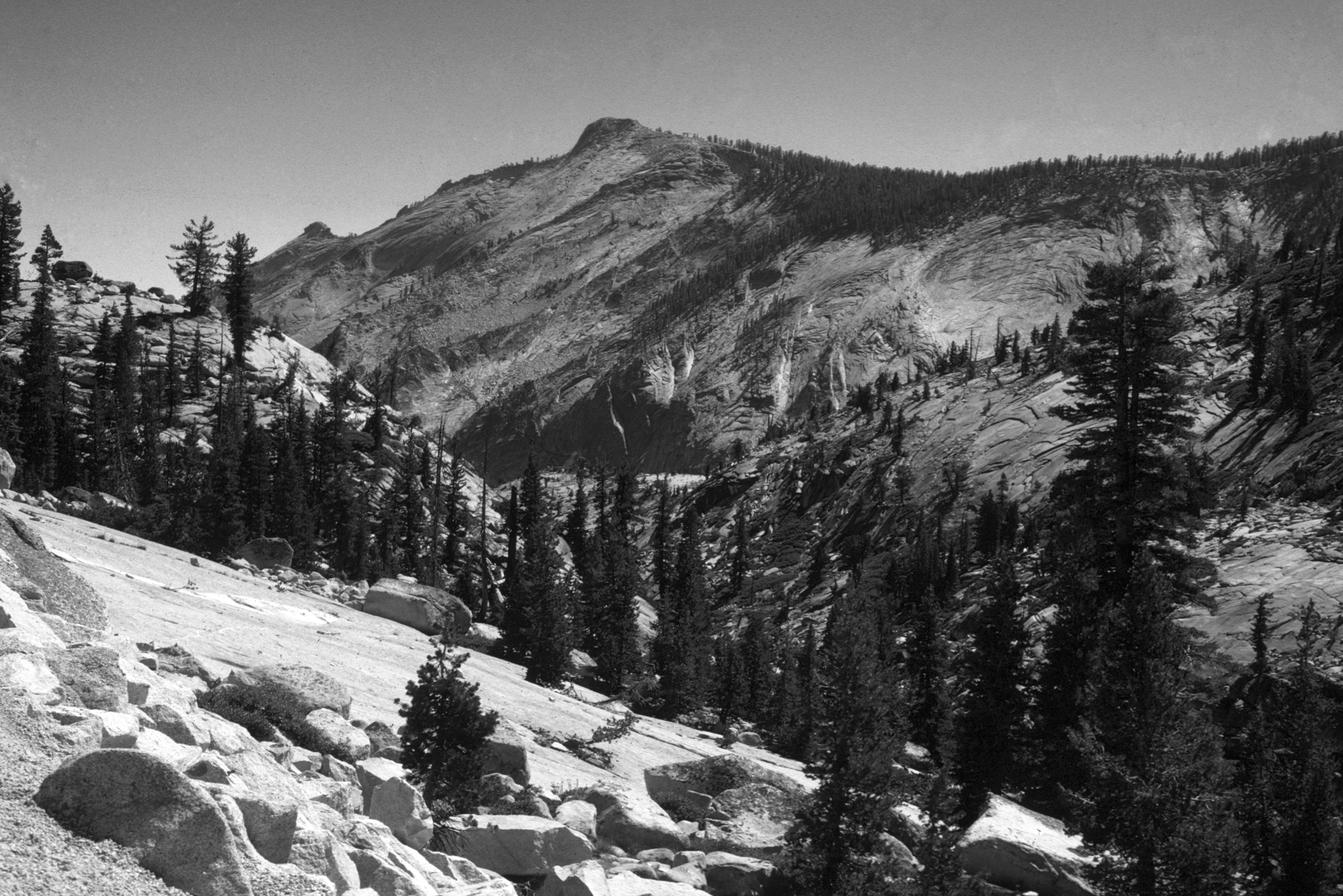
Yosemite scene

During his first summer in the Sierra as a shepherd, Muir wrote field notes that emphasized the role that the senses play in human perceptions of the environment. According to Williams, he speculated that the world was an unchanging entity that was interpreted by the brain through the senses, and, writes Muir, "If the creator were to bestow a new set of senses upon us ... we would never doubt that we were in another world ..." While doing his studies of nature, he would try to remember everything he observed as if his senses were recording the impressions, until he could write them in his journal. As a result of his intense desire to remember facts, he filled his field journals with notes on precipitation, temperature, and even cloud formations.

However, Muir took his journal entries further than recording factual observations. Williams notes that the observations he recorded amounted to a description of "the sublimity of Nature", and what amounted to "an aesthetic and spiritual notebook". Muir felt that his task was more than just recording "phenomena", but also to "illuminate the spiritual implications of those phenomena", writes Williams. For Muir, mountain skies, for example, seemed painted with light, and came to "... symbolize divinity". He often described his observations in terms of light.

Muir biographer Steven Holmes notes that Muir used words like "glory" and "glorious" to suggest that light was taking on a religious dimension: "It is impossible to overestimate the importance of the notion of glory in Muir's published writings, where no other single image carries more emotional or religious weight", adding that his words "exactly parallels its Hebraic origins", in which biblical writings often indicate a divine presence with light, as in the burning bush or pillar of fire, and described as "the glory of God".

=== Seeing nature as home ===
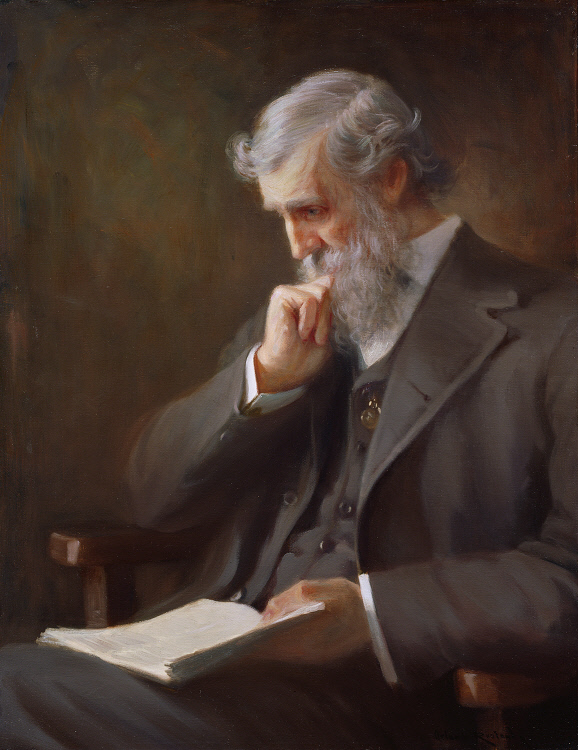
Posthumous portrait by Orlando Rouland (1917)

Muir often used the term "home" as a metaphor for both nature and his general attitude toward the "natural world itself", notes Holmes. He often used domestic language to describe his scientific observations, as when he saw nature as providing a home for even the smallest plant life: "the little purple plant, tended by its Maker, closed its petals, crouched low in its crevice of a home, and enjoyed the storm in safety". Muir also saw nature as his own home, as when he wrote friends and described the Sierra as "God's mountain mansion". He considered not only the mountains as home, however, as he also felt a closeness even to the smallest objects: "The very stones seem talkative, sympathetic, brotherly. No wonder when we consider that we all have the same Father and Mother".

In his later years, he used the metaphor of nature as home in his writings to promote wilderness preservation.

Not surprisingly, Muir's deep-seated feeling about nature as being his true home led to tension with his family at his house in Martinez, California. He once told a visitor to his ranch there, "This is a good place to be housed in during stormy weather, ... to write in, and to raise children in, but it is not my home. Up there", pointing towards the Sierra Nevada, "is my home".

=== Native Americans ===
Muir expressed mixed attitudes towards Native Americans over his life, from sympathy to distaste. He saw nature as ideal when it was free from man's influence, including Native Americans, but he did not recognize that the landscapes he loved had been shaped by Native Americans for millennia, through the use of deliberately-set fires to burn-off understory growth. His earliest encounters, during his childhood in Wisconsin, were with Winnebago Indians, who begged for food and stole his favorite horse. In spite of that, he had expressed sympathy for their "being robbed of their lands and pushed ruthlessly back into narrower and narrower limits by alien races who were cutting off their means of livelihood". His early encounters with the Paiute in California left him feeling ambivalent after seeing their lifestyle, which he described as "lazy" and "superstitious".

Muir wrote of the Miwoks in Yosemite as "most ugly, and some of them altogether hideous" and said "they seemed to have no right place in the landscape, and I was glad to see them fading out of sight down the pass." Ecofeminist philosopher Carolyn Merchant has criticized Muir, believing that he wrote disparagingly of the Native Americans he encountered in his early explorations. Later, after living with Indians, he praised and grew more respectful of their low impact on the wilderness as compared to the heavy impact by European Americans. However, in his journals, he often describes those he encounters as "dirty", "irregular" and "unnatural".

Muir was given the Stickeen (Muir's spelling, coastal tribe) name "Ancoutahan", meaning "adopted chief".

In response to claims about Muir's attitudes about Native Americans, Sierra Club national Board member Chad Hanson wrote, "Muir wrote repeatedly about the intelligence and dignity of Native Americans, and honored how traditional Indigenous peoples lived in peaceful coexistence with Nature and wild creatures, expressing his view that Native peoples ‘rank above’ white settlers, who he increasingly described as selfish, base, and lacking honor. This would become a constant theme in Muir's writings, as he attacked the dominant white culture's destructive and greedy ways, and its anthrosupremacist mindset that placed humans above all else and recognized no intrinsic value in ecosystems or wildlife species beyond whatever profit could be gained by exploiting them."

=== African Americans ===
Muir spoke and wrote about the equality of all people, "regardless of color, or race", and wrote about the immorality of slavery in his final book, Travels in Alaska. During his time in Alaska he also wrote,

...how we were all children of one father; sketched the characteristics of the different races of mankind, showing that no matter how far apart their countries were, how they differed in color, size, language, etc. and no matter how different and how various the ways in which they got a living, that the white man and all the people of the world were essentially alike, that we all had ten fingers and toes and our bodies were the same, whether white, brown, black or different colors, and speak different languages.

In his earlier years, Muir did make some disparaging remarks about African Americans. In A Thousand-Mile Walk to the Gulf, Muir described African Americans as "well trained" but "making a great deal of noise and doing little work. One energetic white man, working with a will, would easily pick as much cotton as half a dozen Sambos and Sallies." Describing the sight of two African Americans at a campfire, he wrote, "I could see their ivory gleaming from the great lips, and their smooth cheeks flashing off light as if made of glass. Seen anywhere but in the South, the glossy pair would have been taken for twin devils, but here it was only a Negro and his wife at their supper." However, at no point in Muir's personal journey to the Gulf did he support or empathize with the institution of slavery, avoiding entreaties from Southern hosts when they prodded him.

In 2020, in light of the movement to remove Confederate monuments across the country, Michael Brune, the executive director of the Sierra Club, reflected on Muir's complex and controversial legacy and announced that the club would shift towards investing in racial justice work and determine which of its monuments need to be renamed or removed. On July 22, 2020, the Sierra Club wrote:

Muir was not immune to the racism peddled by many in the early conservation movement. He made derogatory comments about Black people and Indigenous peoples that drew on deeply harmful racist stereotypes, though his views evolved later in his life. As the most iconic figure in Sierra Club history, Muir's words and actions carry an especially heavy weight. They continue to hurt and alienate Indigenous people and people of color who come into contact with the Sierra Club.

Some of Muir's associates cited by Brune and others, such as Joseph LeConte, David Starr Jordan, and Henry Fairfield Osborn were closely related to the early eugenics movement in the United States. Some claim Muir did not espouse such beliefs.

Aaron Mair, who in 2015 became the first Black president of the Sierra Club board, stated that the contents and framing of Muir in Brune's post "are a misrepresentation". Mair went on to state that Brune, "did not consult him or the other two Black board members before pushing ahead on what he called a 'revisionist' and 'ahistorical' account of Muir's writings, thoughts and life." Mair, along with two other Sierra Club board members, Chad Hanson and Mary Ann Nelson, wrote a response to Brune's attack on Muir, writing:

...while some of Muir’s colleagues promoted White supremacist myths and exclusionary views regarding national parks and forests, Muir spoke out about the importance of making these areas accessible and encouraging all people to experience them, writing, "Few are altogether deaf to the preaching of pine trees. Their sermons on the mountains go to our hearts; and if people in general could be got into the woods, even for once, to hear the trees speak for themselves, all difficulties in the way of forest preservation would vanish." He came to believe deeply in the equality of all people, writing, "We all flow from one fountain Soul. All are expressions of one Love. God does not appear, and flow out, only from narrow chinks and round bored wells here and there in favored races and places."

=== Hetch Hetchy Dam controversy ===
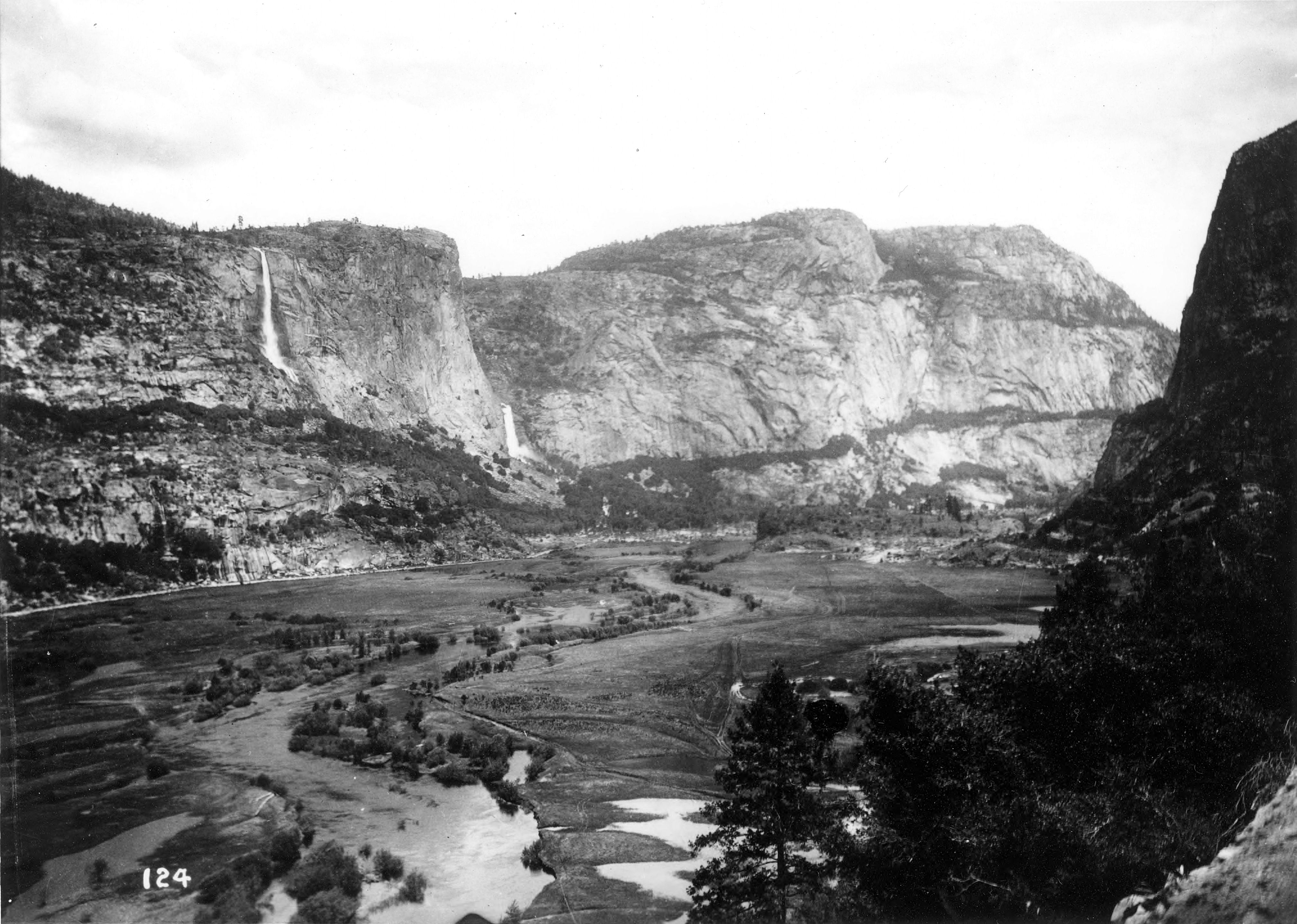
Hetch Hetchy Valley

With population growth continuing in San Francisco, political pressure increased to dam the Tuolumne River for use as a water reservoir. Muir passionately opposed the damming of Hetch Hetchy Valley because he found Hetch Hetchy as stunning as Yosemite Valley. Muir, the Sierra Club and Robert Underwood Johnson fought against inundating the valley. Muir wrote to President Roosevelt pleading for him to scuttle the project. Roosevelt's successor, William Howard Taft, suspended the Interior Department's approval for the Hetch Hetchy right-of-way. After years of national debate, Taft's successor Woodrow Wilson signed the bill authorizing the dam into law on December 19, 1913. Muir felt a great loss from the destruction of the valley, his last major battle. He wrote to his friend Vernon Kellogg, "As to the loss of the Sierra Park Valley [Hetch Hetchy] it's hard to bear. The destruction of the charming groves and gardens, the finest in all California, goes to my heart."

== Personal life ==
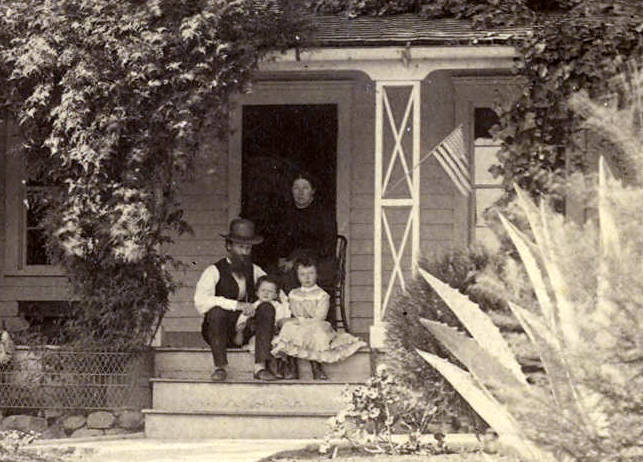
John Muir with wife (Louisa Wanda Strentzel) and children Wanda and Helen circa 1888

In 1878, when he was nearing the age of 40, Muir's friends "pressured him to return to society". Soon after he returned to the Oakland area, he was introduced by Jeanne Carr to Louisa Strentzel, daughter of a prominent physician and horticulturist with a 2,600-acre (4.1 sq mi; 11 km^{2}) fruit orchard in Martinez, California, northeast of Oakland. In 1880, after he returned from a trip to Alaska, Muir and Strentzel married. John Muir went into partnership with his father-in-law John Strentzel, and for ten years directed most of his energy into managing this large fruit farm. Although Muir was a loyal, dedicated husband, and father of two daughters, "his heart remained wild", writes Marquis. His wife understood his needs, and after seeing his restlessness at the ranch would sometimes "shoo him back up" to the mountains. He sometimes took his daughters with him.

The house and part of the ranch are now the John Muir National Historic Site. In addition, the W.H.C. Folsom House, where Muir worked as a printer, is also listed on the National Register of Historic Places.

Muir became a naturalized citizen of the United States in 1903.

== Death ==
Muir died, aged 76, at California Hospital in Los Angeles on December 24, 1914, of pneumonia. He had been in Daggett, California, to see his daughter, Helen Muir Funk. His grandson, Ross Hanna, lived until 2014, when he died at age 91.

== Legacy ==
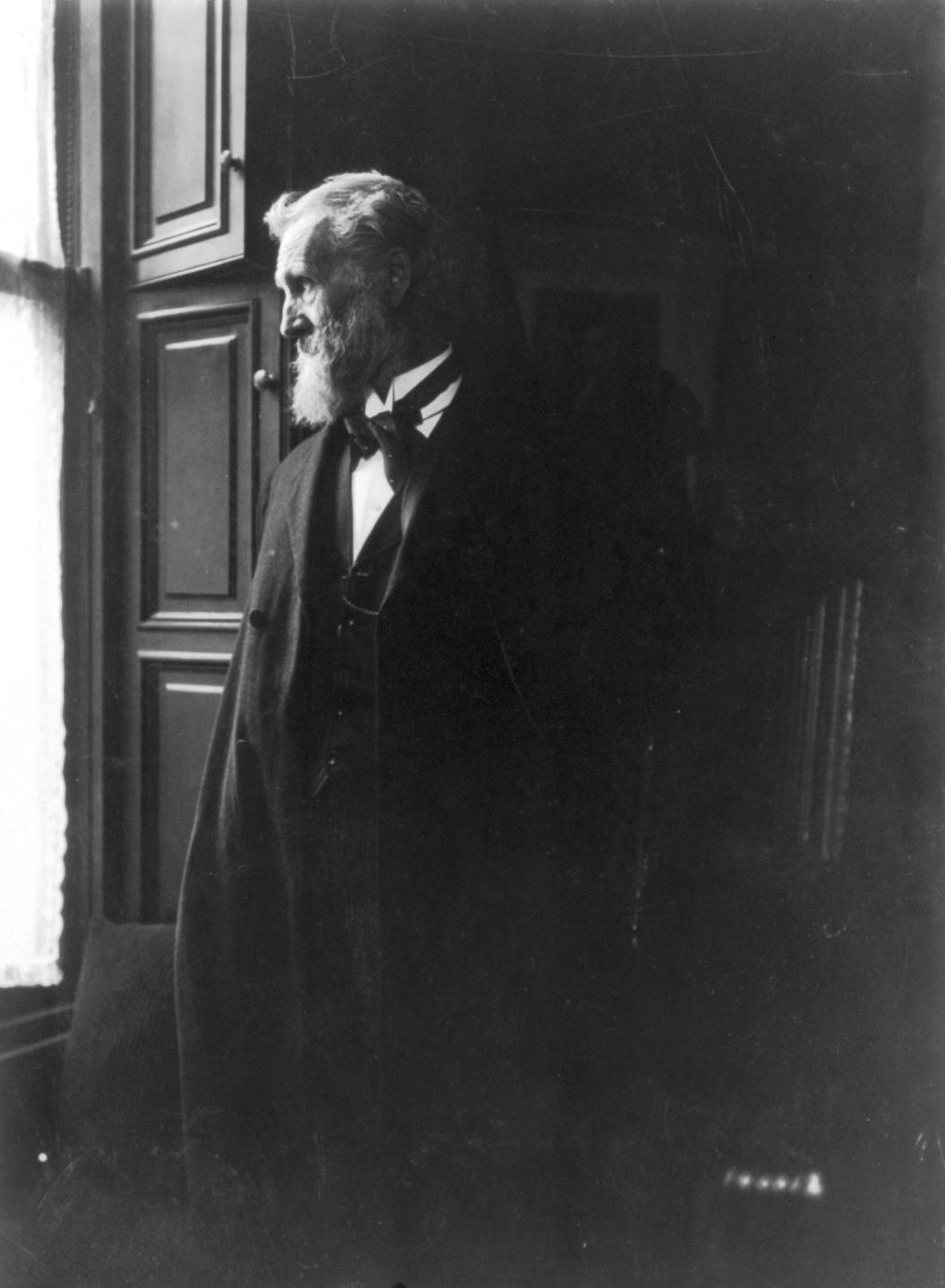
A portrait of Muir c. 1910

During his lifetime John Muir published over 300 articles and 12 books. He co-founded the Sierra Club, which helped establish a number of national parks after he died. Today the club has over 2.4 million members.

Muir has been called the "patron saint of the American wilderness" and its "archetypal free spirit". "As a dreamer and activist, his eloquent words changed the way Americans saw their mountains, forests, seashores, and deserts", said nature writer Gretel Ehrlich. He not only led the efforts to protect forest areas and have some designated as national parks, but his writings presented "human culture and wild nature as one of humility and respect for all life".

Robert Underwood Johnson, editor of Century Magazine, which published many of Muir's articles, states that he influenced people's appreciation of nature and national parks, which became a lasting legacy:

The world will look back to the time we live in and remember the voice of one crying in the wilderness and bless the name of John Muir. ... He sung the glory of nature like another Psalmist, and, as a true artist, was unashamed of his emotions. His countrymen owe him gratitude as the pioneer of our system of national parks. ... Muir's writings and enthusiasm were the chief forces that inspired the movement. All the other torches were lighted from his.

Muir exalted wild nature over human culture and civilization, believing that all life was sacred. Turner describes him as "a man who in his singular way rediscovered America. ... an American pioneer, an American hero". The primary aim of Muir's nature philosophy, writes Wilkins, was to challenge mankind's "enormous conceit", and in so doing, he moved beyond the Transcendentalism of Emerson to a "biocentric perspective on the world". He did so by describing the natural world as "a conductor of divinity", and his writings often made nature synonymous with God. His friend, Henry Fairfield Osborn, observed that as a result of his religious upbringing, Muir retained "this belief, which is so strongly expressed in the Old Testament, that all the works of nature are directly the work of God". In the opinion of Enos Mills, a contemporary who established Rocky Mountain National Park, Muir's writings were "likely to be the most influential force in this century".

Since 1970, the University of the Pacific has housed the largest collection of Muir's personal papers, including his travel journals and notebooks, manuscripts, correspondence, drawings and personal library. In 2019, the University of the Pacific was given full ownership of the Muir collection, which had been expanding over the years. The university has a John Muir Center for Environmental Studies, the Muir Experience, as well as other programs related to Muir and his work.

== Tributes and honors ==
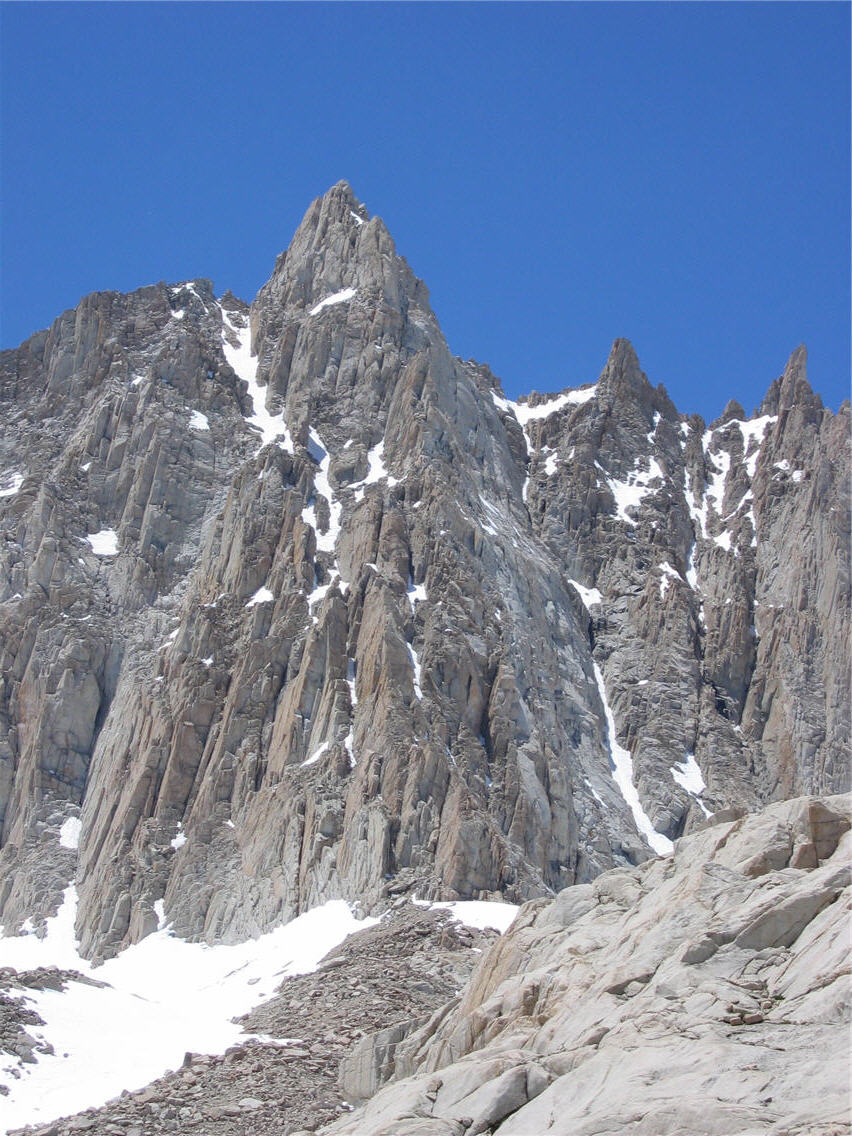
Mount Muir located one mile south of Mount Whitney in the High Sierra

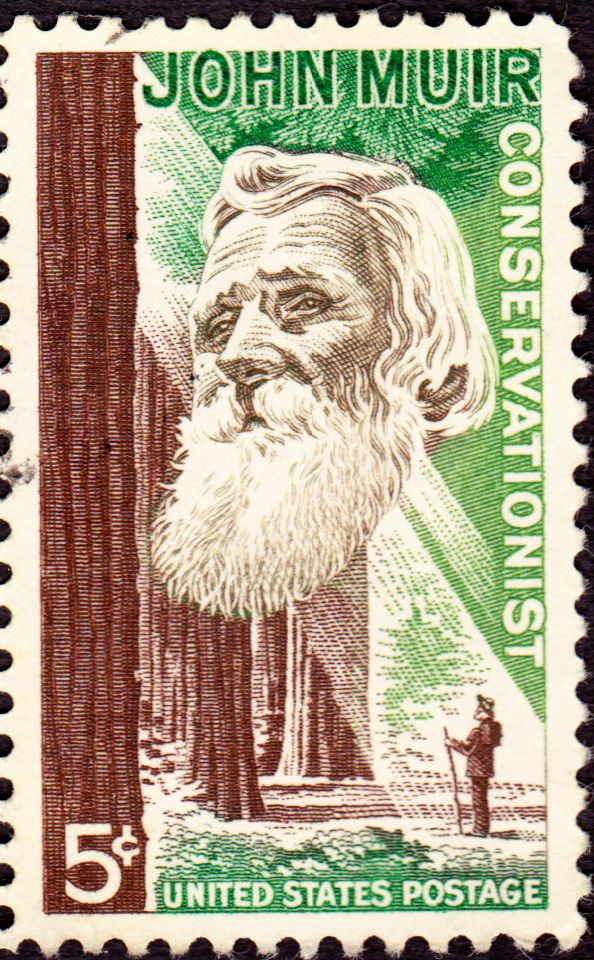
John Muir on a 1964 US commemorative stamp

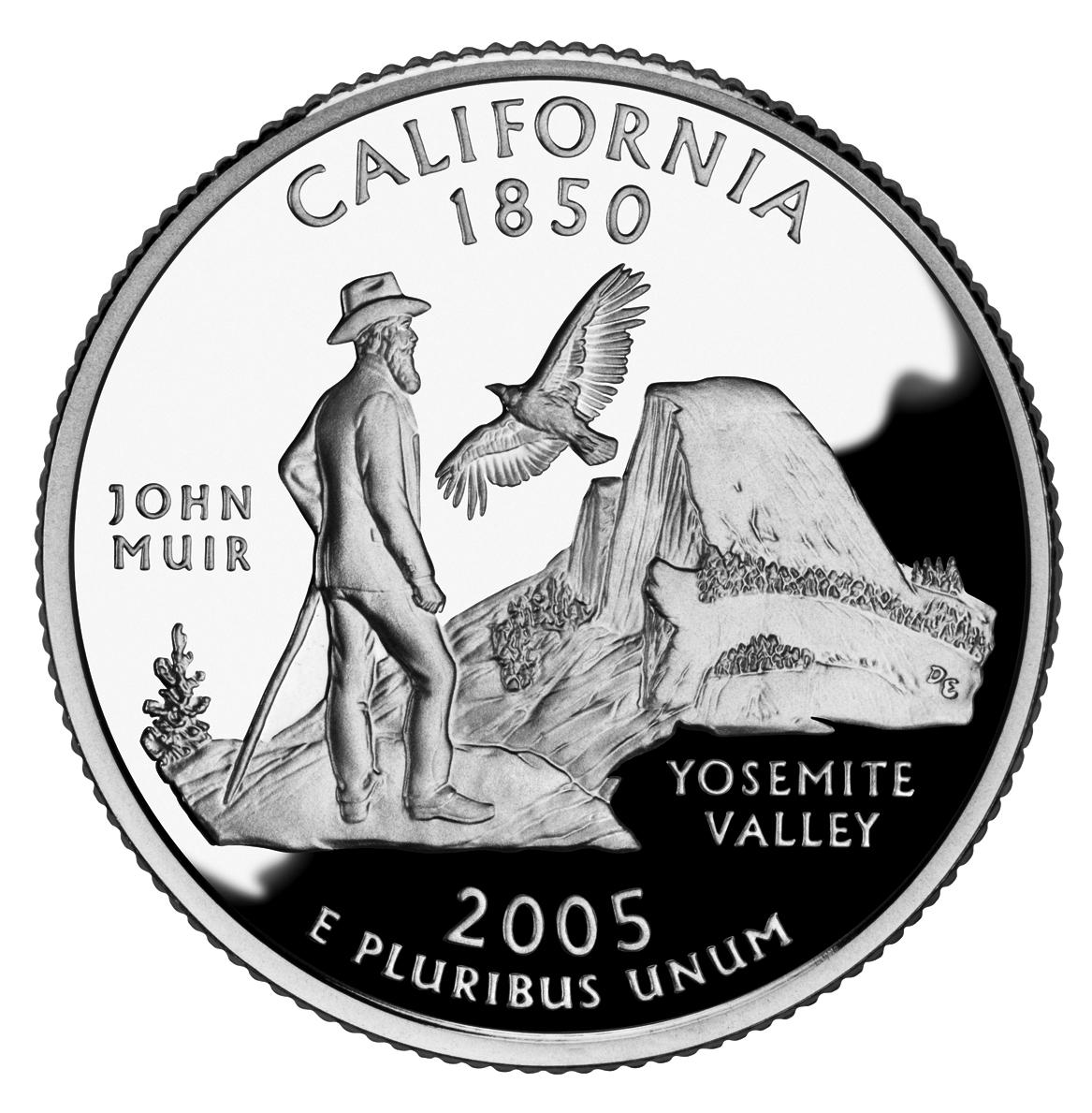
John Muir depicted on the California state quarter

California celebrates John Muir Day on April 21 each year. Muir was the first person honored with a California commemorative day when legislation signed in 1988 created John Muir Day, effective from 1989 onward. Muir is one of three people so honored in California, along with Harvey Milk Day and Ronald Reagan Day.

Mountain Days, a 2000 musical by Craig Bohmler and Mary Bracken Phillips, celebrates Muir's life and was performed annually in a custom-built amphitheater in Muir's adult hometown of Martinez, California.

The play Thank God for John Muir, by Andrew Dallmeyer is based on his life.

The following places are named after Muir:

- Mount Muir in the Sierra Nevada, California
- Mount Muir in Chugach Mountains of Alaska (probable)
- Mount Muir (elevation 4,688 ft or 1,429 m) in Angeles National Forest north of Pasadena, California
- Black Butte, also known as Muir's Peak, next to Mount Shasta, California
- Muir Glacier and Muir Inlet, Alaska
- John Muir Trails in California, Tennessee, Connecticut, and Wisconsin
- John Muir Wilderness (southern and central Sierra Nevada)
- Muir Pass Sequoia and Kings Canyon National Parks, the divide at 11,955 ft (3,644 m) above sea level, between Evolution Creek and Middle Fork of Kings River
- John Muir Health hospital network in Walnut Creek, California
- Muir Woods National Monument just north of San Francisco, California
- John Muir National Historic Site in Martinez, California
- Camp Muir in Mount Rainier National Park
- John Muir College, the second established of the eight undergraduate colleges of University of California, San Diego
- John Muir High School, an Early College Magnet in Pasadena, California
- John Muir Elementary School, an elementary school in San Jose, California.
- John Muir Elementary, an elementary school in Portage, Wisconsin
- John Muir Highway, a section of California State Route 132 between Coulterville and Smith Station at California State Route 120. This road roughly follows part of the route Muir took on his first walk to Yosemite.
- John Muir Memorial County Park, County Park memorializing his father's homestead when they immigrated to Wisconsin
- The main-belt asteroid 128523 Johnmuir
- John Muir Country Park, East Lothian. Scotland.
- John Muir Way long-distance trail in southern Scotland
- John Muir House, the headquarters building of East Lothian Council, Scotland.
- John Muir Campus, Dunbar One of two campuses of Dunbar Primary School, the successor to the school Muir attended.
- Muir Woods also called John Muir Park, in Madison, Wisconsin, was designed by G. William Longenecker and Richard E Tipple from the University of Wisconsin Landscape Architecture Department. Official dedication of John Muir Park took place on February 8, 1964. Ceremonies at the State Historical Society of Wisconsin headquarters building included the unveiling of a John Muir commemorative stamp.
- Muir Valley – a privately owned nature preserve and rock climbing area in the Red River Gorge area of Kentucky. The Valley is approximately 400 acres in size and walled in by over seven miles of majestic cliffs of hard Corbin Sandstone. The owners, Rick & Liz Weber, chose the name, "Muir Valley", to honor the memory of John Muir.

John Muir was featured on two US commemorative postage stamps. A 5-cent stamp issued on April 29, 1964, was designed by Rudolph Wendelin, and showed Muir's face superimposed on a grove of redwood trees, and the inscription, "John Muir Conservationist". A 32-cent stamp issued on February 3, 1998, was part of the "Celebrate the Century" series, and showed Muir in Yosemite Valley, with the inscription "John Muir, Preservationist". An image of Muir, with the California condor and Half Dome, appears on the California state quarter released in 2005. A quotation of his appears on the reverse side of the Indianapolis Prize Lilly Medal for conservation. On December 6, 2006, California Governor Arnold Schwarzenegger and First Lady Maria Shriver inducted John Muir into the California Hall of Fame located at The California Museum for History, Women, and the Arts.

The John Muir Trust is a Scottish charity established as a membership organization in 1983 to conserve wild land and wild places. It has more than 11,000 members internationally.

The John Muir Birthplace Charitable Trust is a Scottish charity whose aim is to support John Muir's birthplace in Dunbar, which opened in 2003 as an interpretative centre focused on Muir's work. A statue of Muir as a boy by the Ukrainian sculptor Valentin Znoba had been unveiled outside the house in 1997.

Muirite (a mineral), Erigeron muirii, Carlquistia muirii (two species of aster), Ivesia muirii (a member of the rose family), Troglodytes troglodytes muiri (a wren), Ochotona princeps muiri (a pika), Thecla muirii (a butterfly), Calamagrostis muiriana (a Sierra Nevada subalpine-alpine grass) and Amplaria muiri (a millipede) were all named after John Muir.

In 2006, he was inducted into the Hall of Great Westerners of the National Cowboy & Western Heritage Museum.

== See also ==
- George Dorr
- Michael Muir (great-grandson)

== Works ==
=== Books ===
- Muir, John (1916). A Thousand-mile Walk to the Gulf. Boston: Houghton Mifflin. ISBN 978-1728654881. "gulf muir."
- Muir, John (1911). Edward Henry Harriman. Garden City, New York: Doubleday, Page. ISBN 978-1375410335.
- Muir, John (1996). Gifford, Terry (ed.). John Muir: His Life and Letters and Other Writings. London: Seattle: Mountaineers Books. ISBN 978-0898864632.
- Flinders, Tim, ed. (2013). John Muir: Spiritual Writings. Maryknoll, NY: Orbis Books. ISBN 978-1626980358.
- Muir, John (1915). Letters to a Friend: Written to Mrs. Ezra S. Carr, 1866-1879. Boston: Houghton Mifflin. ISBN 978-0486832371. "Letters to a Friend."
- Muir, John (1911). My First Summer in the Sierra. Boston: Houghton Mifflin. LCCN 17000159. OL 6593288M.
- Muir, John (1901). Our National Parks. Boston: Houghton, Mifflin. ISBN 978-1423650393. "Our National Parks."
- Muir, John (1888). Picturesque California: The Rocky Mountains and the Pacific Slope; California, Oregon, Nevada, Washington, Alaska, Montana, Idaho, Arizona, Colorado, Utah, Wyoming, Etc. J. Dewing Publishing Company. ASIN B001PV5DKK.
- Muir, John (1918). Steep Trails. Boston: Houghton. ISBN 978-1557427885. "Steep Trails."
- "Stickeen – John Muir's Adventure with a Dog and a Glacier". Sierra Club.
- Muir, John (1950). Studies in the Sierra. "reprint of serials from 1874"
- Muir, John (1917). The Cruise of the Corwin. Boston: Houghton Mifflin. ISBN 978-1010129097. "The Cruise of the Corwin."
- Muir, John (1894). The Mountains of California. New York: Century. ISBN 978-1986655576.
- Muir, John (1913). The Story of My Boyhood and Youth. Boston: Houghton, Mifflin. ISBN 978-1406808636. OL 1618178W. "The Story of My Boyhood and Youth."
- Muir, John (1912). The Yosemite. New York: Century. ISBN 978-1684221783.
- Muir, John (1915). Travels in Alaska. Boston: Houghton Mifflin. ISBN 978-1611045659. "Travels in Alaska."

=== Essays online ===
- "Alaska. The Discovery of Glacier Bay"
- "The American Forests"
- "Among the Animals of the Yosemite"
- "Among the Birds of the Yosemite"
- "The Coniferous Forests of the Sierra Nevada"
- "Features of the Proposed Yosemite National Park"
- "The Forests of Yosemite Park"
- "Fountains and Streams of the Yosemite"
- "In the Heart of the California Alps"
- "Living Glaciers of California"
- "The New Sequoia Forests of California"
- "A Rival of the Yosemite, King's River Canyon"
- "Snow-Storm on Mount Shasta"
- "Studies in the Sierra: The Glacier Meadows of the Sierra"
- "Studies in the Sierra: The Mountain Lakes of California"
- "Studies in the Sierra: The Passes of the Sierra"
- "The Treasures of the Yosemite"
- "The Wild Gardens of the Yosemite Park"
- "The Wild Parks and Forest Reservations of the West"
- "The Wild Sheep of the Sierra"
- "The Yellowstone National Park"
- "The Yosemite National Park"
