= Bloody Mary =

Bloody Mary most commonly refers to:

- Mary I (1516–1558; r. 1553–1558), Queen of England, nicknamed by her Protestant opponents due to her role in the Marian persecutions
- Bloody Mary (folklore), a ghost who appears in a mirror when her name is repeatedly chanted
- Bloody Mary (cocktail), made with tomato juice, vodka, and other flavorings
- Mary Partington, who is best known for shooting and accidentally killing an intruder in her home in 1966

Bloody Mary may also refer to:

== Film ==
- Bloody Mary (2006 film), an American horror film
- Bloody Mary (2022 film), an Indian crime film

== Literature ==
- Bloody Mary (comics), various characters
- Bloody Mary (South Pacific), a character in Tales of the South Pacific by James Michener
- B'loody Mary Smith, a character from the Harry Potter-based fan fiction My Immortal

== Music ==
- "Bloody Mary", a song from the 1949 musical South Pacific
- "Bloody Mary", a 1978 song by Whitesnake from Snakebite
- "Bloody Mary (A Note on Apathy)", a 2000 song by Five for Fighting from America Town
- "Bloody Mary", a 2008 song by The Alice Rose
- "Bloody Mary" (song), 2011, by Lady Gaga from the album Born this Way
- "Bloody Mary (Nerve Endings)", a 2012 song by Silversun Pickups from the album Neck of the Woods

== Television ==
- "Bloody Mary" (South Park), an episode of South Park
- "Bloody Mary" (Supernatural), an episode of Supernatural

== Other uses ==
- Bloody Mary (rapper) (fl. 1992–1995), member of the rap group Bloods & Crips
- Typhoon Mary (1960), a Category 1-equivalent typhoon nicknamed Bloody Mary by the Joint Typhoon Warning Center

== See also ==
- Bloody (disambiguation)
- Mary (disambiguation)
- Agent 077: Mission Bloody Mary, a 1965 adventure film
- Dead Mary, a 2007 horror film
- Mary, Bloody Mary, a 1999 young adult novel
- Mary, Mary, Bloody Mary, a 1974 horror film
- The Bloody Mary Show, a British comedy web series
- The Legend of Bloody Mary, a 2008 horror film
- "Un Blodymary", a 2006 song by Las Ketchup
- Urban Legends: Bloody Mary, a 2005 horror film
