= Mulhern Lake =

Lake in Marquette County, Wisconsin

- Location within Wisconsin Location within the United States
- Location: Marquette County, Wisconsin, U.S.
- Coordinates: 43°39′09″N 89°21′11″W
- Type: Seepage lake
- Basin countries: United States
- Surface area: 29 acres (0.12 km^{2})
- Average depth: 12 ft (3.7 m)
- Max. depth: 32 ft (9.8 m)
- Surface elevation: 800 ft (244 m)

Mulhern Lake is a freshwater lake in the town of Buffalo (Marquette County), Wisconsin. Nearby communities include Endeavor, Dalton and Pardeeville. The lake is known its role in shaping and inspiring naturalist John Muir, who lived near the lake and was baptized there.

== Background ==
Mulhern Lake, once known as Knight's Lake, is located near Ennis Lake, more commonly referred to as Fountain Lake Farm, the boyhood home of environmentalist John Muir. Muir and his family moved there from Scotland in 1849 when Muir was 11 years old. In 1857, his family moved to Hickory Hill, a nearby home. About the same time, Muir and his two siblings were re-baptized in what is now Mulhern Lake. Muir finally moved from the area in 1860, bound for Madison, Wisconsin.

About the time the Muir family arrived, Knight's Lake was owned by Asahel C. Knight, who in 1849 purchased 120 acres (49 ha) of land around the lake. Knight, 45, was born in New York, and lived in Wisconsin with his wife Luisa along with their two-year-old daughter, according to the 1850 census.

In 1912, a farmer named Ben Mulhern purchased 200 acres (81 ha) of land surrounding the lake, and over time area residents began referring to the lake as Mulhern Lake. The lake's name was formally changed by the state of Wisconsin in 1994. The U.S. government adopted the name change in 2010.

== Ecology, geology and soil content ==
Mulhern Lake is considered a seepage lake, having neither tributary nor effluent. The lake has a maximum depth of 32 feet and a mean depth of 12 ft (3.7 m), and its elevation is 800 ft (240 m) above sea level. The lake's bottom is 95% muck and 5% sand.

== Lake management ==
The lake is managed and maintained by the Wisconsin Department of Natural Resources. Fish species include panfish (abundant), largemouth bass (common), and northern pike (present). Although motorboats do not appear to be explicitly prohibited, the lake's relatively small size is more conducive to electric motors, wind-powered craft or manual propulsion such as rowing. Today there are a handful of homes on the lake, but in keeping with the legacy of Muir, much of the land surrounding the lake has been set aside for conservation.
