= Michael Muir =

Great-grandson of John Muir

- Michael Muir in 2021
- Born: 1952 (age 73–74)
- Known for: Disability activism Horse breeding and racing Being the great-grandson of environmentalist John Muir
- Relatives: John Muir

Michael Muir (born 1952), born Michael John Hanna, is the great-grandson of John Muir through daughter Wanda Muir Hanna and her son, Ross Hanna. He is an avid horseman, carriage driver, disability rights advocate, and the founder of the Stonewall Sporthorse, a mix of Appaloosa, Percheron, Friesian, Knabstrupper, and various warmblood horse breeds. Muir first began breeding Appaloosas as a teenager in the 1960s, with Friesian infusions starting in 1996, and Knabstrupper crosses in 2001–2002. He runs Rush Ranch, a historic 2,070-acre working ranch in California that is owned and managed by the Solano Land Trust, and is the director for disability nonprofit Access Adventure, which he established in 2005. Muir, who has suffered from multiple sclerosis since he turned 15 years old in 1967, lives on his ranch in Vacaville, California.
