= Bloody Mary (comics) =

Bloody Mary, in comics, may refer to:

- Bloody Mary (DC Comics), a DC Comics character and member of the Female Furies
- Bloody Mary (Helix), two series for DC Comics imprint Helix written by Garth Ennis and illustrated by Carlos Ezquerra featuring the character of the same name
- Bloody Mary (Marvel Comics), an alias of the Marvel Comics character better known as Typhoid Mary

== See also ==
- Bloody Mary (disambiguation)
