= Erigeron muirii =

Scientific classification
- Kingdom: Plantae
- Clade: Tracheophytes
- Clade: Angiosperms
- Clade: Eudicots
- Clade: Asterids
- Order: Asterales
- Family: Asteraceae
- Genus: Erigeron
- Species: E. muirii

Binomial name
- Erigeron muirii A.Gray

Synonyms
- Aster muirii (A.Gray) Onno; Erigeron grandiflorus subsp. muirii (A.Gray) Hultén

Species of flowering plant

Erigeron muirii, or Muir's fleabane, is a rare Arctic species of flowering plant in the family Asteraceae. It has been found only in northern Alaska and the northern Yukon Territory, including Herschel Island in the Arctic Ocean. It grows in tundra, dry slopes, and rock outcrops.

Erigeron muirii is a small perennial herb rarely more than 12 cm (5 inches) high, covered with thick wool that gives it a gray-green appearance, spreading by means of underground rhizomes. The plant generally produces only one flower head per stem, the head containing sometimes as many as 100 ray florets surrounding numerous yellow disc florets.

Erigeron muirii was discovered by noted conservationist John Muir near Cape Thompson, Alaska during his travels there in 1881. Muir sent the plants he collected to his friend and botanist Asa Gray, who determined that the Erigeron was a new species, which he named in honor of Muir.
