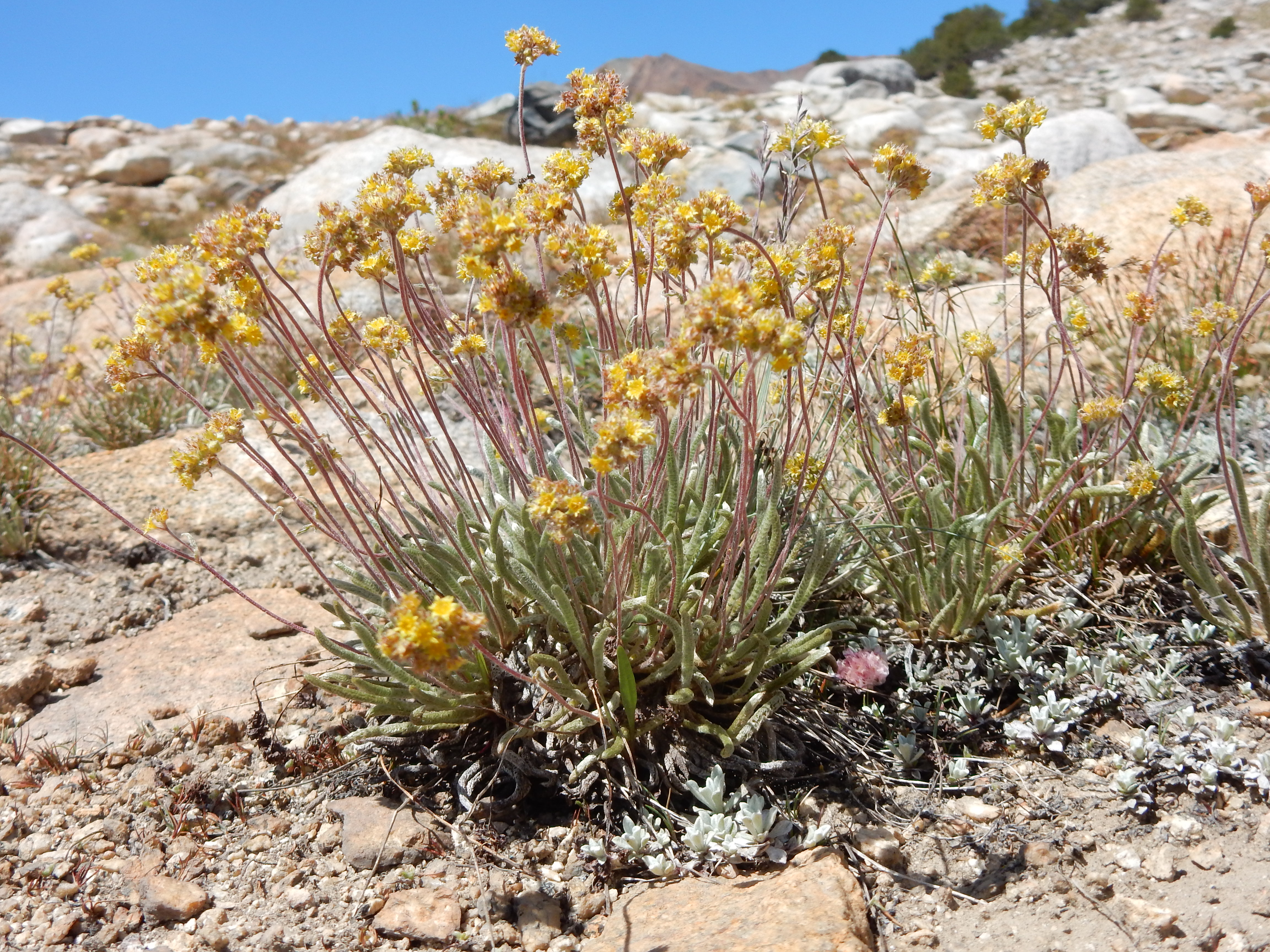

Scientific classification
- Kingdom: Plantae
- Clade: Tracheophytes
- Clade: Angiosperms
- Clade: Eudicots
- Clade: Rosids
- Order: Rosales
- Family: Rosaceae
- Genus: Potentilla
- Species: P. muirii

Binomial name
- Potentilla muirii (Gray) Greene

Synonyms
- Horkelia muirii (A.Gray) Rydb.; Ivesia muirii A.Gray; Horkelia chandleri Rydb.; Ivesia chandleri (Rydb.) Rydb.

= Potentilla muirii =

Species of flowering plant

Potentilla muirii, commonly known as granite mousetail, is a species of flowering plant in the rose family. It is endemic to the High Sierra Nevada of California, where it grows on rocky slopes and cliffs.

== Description ==
Potentilla muirii is a small perennial herb growing in tufts of erect leaves and stems. The leaf is 2 to 5 centimeters long and is made up of many densely hairy overlapping leaflets such that the leaf is a cylindrical, pointed, whitish to silvery body. The mostly naked stem is up to 15 centimeters long and holds an inflorescence of clustered flowers. Each flower is about half a centimeter wide, with triangular sepals covered in long, white hairs. Between the sepals are narrow, pointed petals of bright yellow. In the center of the flower are a few stamens and pistils. The fruit is an achene about two millimeters long which is gray with reddish spots.
