= Bloody Lake =

Lake in the state of Minnesota, United States

- Location within Minnesota
- Location: Murray County, Minnesota
- Coordinates: 44°7′47″N 95°40′3″W
- Type: lake

Bloody Lake is a lake in Murray County, in the U.S. state of Minnesota.

The name Bloody Lake commemorates the Dakota War of 1862. However, there is an alternate hydronymy: that it was named before 1862, for the tannins produced by plants on the lake's shoreline that gave it a "rusty color".

Bloody Lake has been known for well over 100 years as one of the best fishing lakes in Minnesota, especially for winter ice fishing.
