= Fountain Lake Farm =

- Fountain Lake Farm (Wisconsin Farm Home of John Muir)
- U.S. National Register of Historic Places
- U.S. National Historic Landmark
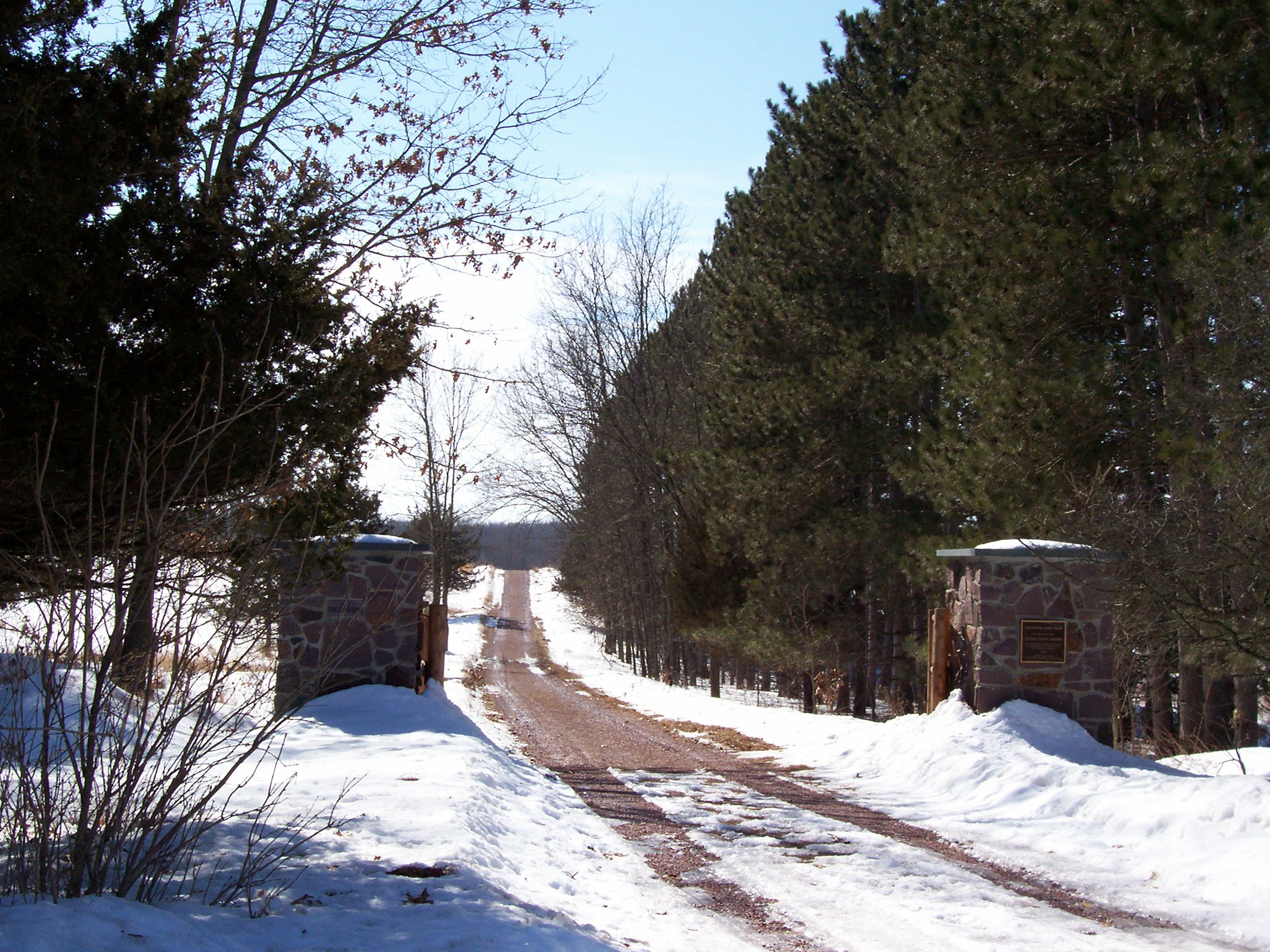
- Entrance into Fountain Lake Farm

- Location within Wisconsin Location within the United States
- Nearest city: Montello, Wisconsin; United States
- Coordinates: 43°41′30″N 89°23′14″W
- Area: 80 acres (32 ha)
- Built: 1864
- NRHP reference No.: 90000471

Significant dates
- Added to NRHP: 1990-06-21
- Designated NHL: 1990-06-21

Fountain Lake Farm, also known as the Wisconsin Farm Home of John Muir, is a historic farm and National Historic Landmark in rural Montello, Wisconsin, United States. The landmark covers part of the farm that was the home of pioneering conservationist John Muir from 1849 to 1856 and 1860 to 1862. Covering 80 acres (32 ha), the landmarked area is partly private property and partly in John Muir Memorial County Park, a minimally developed public park.

== Description and history ==
John Muir came to the United States in 1849 as an eleven-year-old immigrant with his father, who established a farm in Marquette County, Wisconsin. The 160-acre (65 ha) farm property later expanded to 320 acres (130 ha) in what was essentially undeveloped wilderness, which would play a significant role in developing the young Muir's appreciation of nature and the development of his conservation ethic. Muir explored Fountain Lake, partially on the farm property and the farm's namesake, and the ecosystems that surrounded it. The family farmstead was located on a knoll in the northeastern portion of the acreage 80 acres (32 ha) that makes up the landmark designation.

The landmarked area is a rectangle consisting of those southern 80 acres of the Muir property. It is bounded on the north by Gillette Drive, and includes of a parcel of private land at its northeast corner, as well as the northeastern part of the county's John Muir Memorial Park. The private land, about 18 acres (7.3 ha), includes the area that was the site of the Muir's farmhouse. The southern and western portions of the landmarked area are accessible via a trail that encircles the lake and via a parking area on County Road F. There are no standing structures in the landmarked area that date to the Muir's ownership, although some trees survive from the Muir period.

== See also ==
- List of National Historic Landmarks in Wisconsin
- National Register of Historic Places listings in Marquette County, Wisconsin
