= Mary Partington =

Retired schoolteacher and goat farmer

Mary Ann Partington
- Born: March 22, 1889; Lincoln, Nebraska
- Died: June 12, 1979 (aged 90); Lincoln, Nebraska
- Occupation: Schoolteacher
- Known for: Local Urban Legends

Mary Partington (March 22, 1889 – June 12, 1979) was a retired schoolteacher and goat farmer who is best known for shooting and accidentally killing an intruder in her home in 1966 near Lincoln, Nebraska. The incident gave rise to her nickname, "Bloody Mary," and a series of rumors about her supposed cruelty.

== Biography ==
=== Early life ===
Mary Ann Partington was born in Lincoln, Nebraska, on March 22, 1889, to Harold James and Ella Rhatigan Partington. Partington's father, Harold James Partington (February 28, 1865 - July 7, 1944), was an English immigrant who had come to the United States in 1885 to work as a dairyman. Harold James Partington married Ella Partington (née Rhatigan) in Lincoln on October 21, 1887. Ella Partington (December 4, 1865 - April 23, 1923) was born in Bernard, Iowa, as the daughter of Irish immigrants. Ella had graduated from St. Mary's Academy in Dubuque and came to Nebraska to work as a schoolteacher in McCook. Ella later moved to Lincoln to work as a seamstress and waitress at the Lincoln Hotel before becoming the cook and housekeeper for the Abbott family.

Mary was the eldest of nine children who grew up tending to chores on the farm they rented from the Abbotts. Mary and her siblings walked to school in the nearby town of University Place, a suburb of Lincoln. In 1906, the family moved into a twelve-room house which they had built at 44th and Superior Streets. The Partington's house was quite large for the time period and area, when most farmhouses had three bedrooms. The Partington house had six bedrooms, two parlors, a recreation room, a windmill which pumped water directly to the house and barns, a 3,000 gallon water tank, and plumbing which carried sewage to a nearby pond. The house was described as the "marvel" of the area.

For much of Mary's youth, her home was a hub of activity in the community. Classmates, friends, and neighbors would flock to the Partington home for parties. Harold Partington offered an open invitation to the community to skate on his pond in the winter or come sit on his porch in the summer to watch the fireworks on the Fourth of July.

=== Career ===
Mary Partington graduated from the University of Nebraska on May 27, 1918, with a bachelor's degree and a teaching certificate. Partington taught junior high students in Lewiston, Nebraska, and later chemistry and science in Genoa, Nebraska. Students remembered Partington as a tall, unflappable, and authoritative woman who kept to herself and rarely left her boarding house.

Mary's mother, Ella, died on April 23, 1923, while helping to push the family car out of the mud as Mary steered. Her mother's death greatly affected Mary, who held herself responsible. During Ella's funeral service, Mary began to wail aloud and was escorted out. Mary retired from teaching after her mother's death, occasionally working as a substitute teacher at local schools. Instead of teaching, Mary stayed home to help care for the farm, her father, and younger siblings.

Mary never married, but kept herself busy and well-connected with her community through volunteering, substitute teaching at St. Patrick's school in Havelock, leading local children in 4-H, and her membership in the Havelock Extension Club. Mary was fondly remembered by the children she taught and volunteered with, who said that she could inspire the best in people and make them believe that they were "the best."

=== Later years ===
After her father's death in 1944, Partington continued to live alone in the house on a tract of wooded land in what is today Lincoln's Boosalis Park. Partington never brought electricity or modern plumbing to the house. At some point, Mary invited William Kline to rent portions of her land to raise pigs. Kline hired Clarence 'Pig Man' Higby to care for his hogs. Partington never drove a car after her mother's death, instead riding her bike or walking wherever she went, regardless of the weather. Partington also continued to wear the old-fashioned clothing she had worn growing up. Partington's father had deeded her the land, tax free, but she had very little income. Partington raised goats, chickens, and vegetables to feed herself.

As the city grew around her home in the 1950s and 1960s, the land around her home became increasingly suburban. Mary happily babysat her neighbors' children and brought them gifts on every holiday. Neighbors made a habit of checking in on Mary and giving her rides in their cars.

Because her home was not electrified, there was virtually no sign of habitation on the property at night. This, combined with its seclusion and "overgrown" appearance, caused teenagers from other parts of the city to believe the house was abandoned. Beginning in the 1960s, curious teenagers would trespass on the property at night. Fraternities at the University of Nebraska began to include trips to Partington's house as part of their initiation rites. The seclusion of her home combined with her independent nature and habit of wearing old-fashioned clothing made Partington the target of rumors and harassment by local teenagers.

The harassment of Partington escalated and on October 25, 1961, Partington was shot by a group of trespassers through her window at night. The bullet hit Partington in the stomach and concerned neighbors who had heard the gunshots called the sheriff. The sheriff arrived but did not see anyone wounded outside the house and thus left. The next day, a stranger passed by Partington's house and Partington told her what had happened last night. The woman drove Partington to the hospital, where doctors removed a .22 caliber rifle slug from her abdomen.

After the shooting, Partington acquired a gun which she used to frighten trespassers. Despite warning shots fired from her upstairs bedroom, trespassers continued to harass her, throwing rocks at her home, breaking windows, shooting at the walls, killing her goats, and painting obscenities on her house. A common dare was to go to the area at night, steal something from the 'Pig Man' and then steal something from Partington's home. On the advice of concerned neighbors and friends, Mary installed a telephone in her home in 1961.

Multiple times Partington awoke to intruders in her home. In 1962, an unknown man broke into Mary's home, blindfolded her, tied her to a chair, put a gun to her head, and demanded she tell him where she kept her food and valuables. The assailant left with his stolen goods and Mary freed herself, but the incident left her scared.

On the night of October 26, 1966, Mary was awakened by the sounds of a commotion outside her house. Partington called the sheriff but no law enforcement came. Mary stayed in her bedroom until she heard the window in her kitchen break an hour later. Partington descended the stairs with her shotgun and saw a man's head coming through her kitchen window. Mary fired once at the man and he fell backwards. Partington believed she had merely scared the young man away and called again for the police.

When police arrived, they found the body of Earl Eldon Hill, a local man who had been recently discharged from a mental hospital. Partington had shot him in the cheek and he had died instantly. Due to the nature of the incident, Partington was not charged for the killing and it was deemed an act of self defense.

The harassment continued, despite frequent visits from the local law enforcement, Partington's warning shots, the killing of Earl Hill, and numerous letters to the editor in which Mary pleaded with the youth of the city to leave her alone. After her sister's death, Partington lacked a reliable support network in town. At her niece Mary Ann Davis' urging, Partington moved from her beloved home into the nearby city of Lincoln in 1976. In 1977, an arsonist burned down her abandoned home and Partington died two years later in 1979.

== Legacy and legend ==
Mary Partington was a devoutly Catholic woman who was also very proud of her Irish heritage. Partington was also a strong proponent of education. Partington believed that her grandmother, Ann Clarke Rhatigan, was closely related to Sister Mary Frances Clarke, the founder of Clarke College in Dubuque, Iowa. Upon her death, Mary Partington left $20,200 to Clarke College and $20,200 to Creighton University Medical Center.

The charred remains of the Partington homestead were cleared and the land was returned to its original state, bequeathed to the city of Lincoln, and is now part of Lincoln's Helen Boosalis Park. Despite being publicly owned, the land is not open to the public. This is partially due to the rumors surrounding the land and also because of the large amounts of trash in the woods.

Stories about Partington typically involve her neighbors William Kline, who owned the tract of densely wooded land next to hers, and Clarence 'Pig Man' Higby, Kline's employee who tended Kline's pigs on the land. Kline worked as a garbage collector and fed his pigs with the refuse he collected, he dumped the inedible garbage around his land, sometimes as makeshift fencing for his hogs. The mysterious piles of refuse and the reclusive inhabitants of the land contributed to the rumors about the woods.

Some stories claim that Partington was a witch and that her ghost can still be seen haunting her land in north Lincoln. The ghost stories may have arisen from early encounters between Mary and the trespassers in which a "ghostly" Partington would appear in a white nightgown in her bedroom window. Because the house was presumed to be abandoned, the trespassers reasoned that she must be a ghost.

Despite rumors and local urban legends which depict Partington as cruel or malevolent, interviews with people who personally interacted with Partington almost universally describe her as a kind woman with eccentric habits. Her uncommon lifestyle, outdated clothes and house, and independence made her the subject of rumors which developed into urban legends.
