= Bloody Canyon =

Coordinates: 37.879°N 119.157°W

Bloody Canyon is a valley in Mono County, California, in the United States.

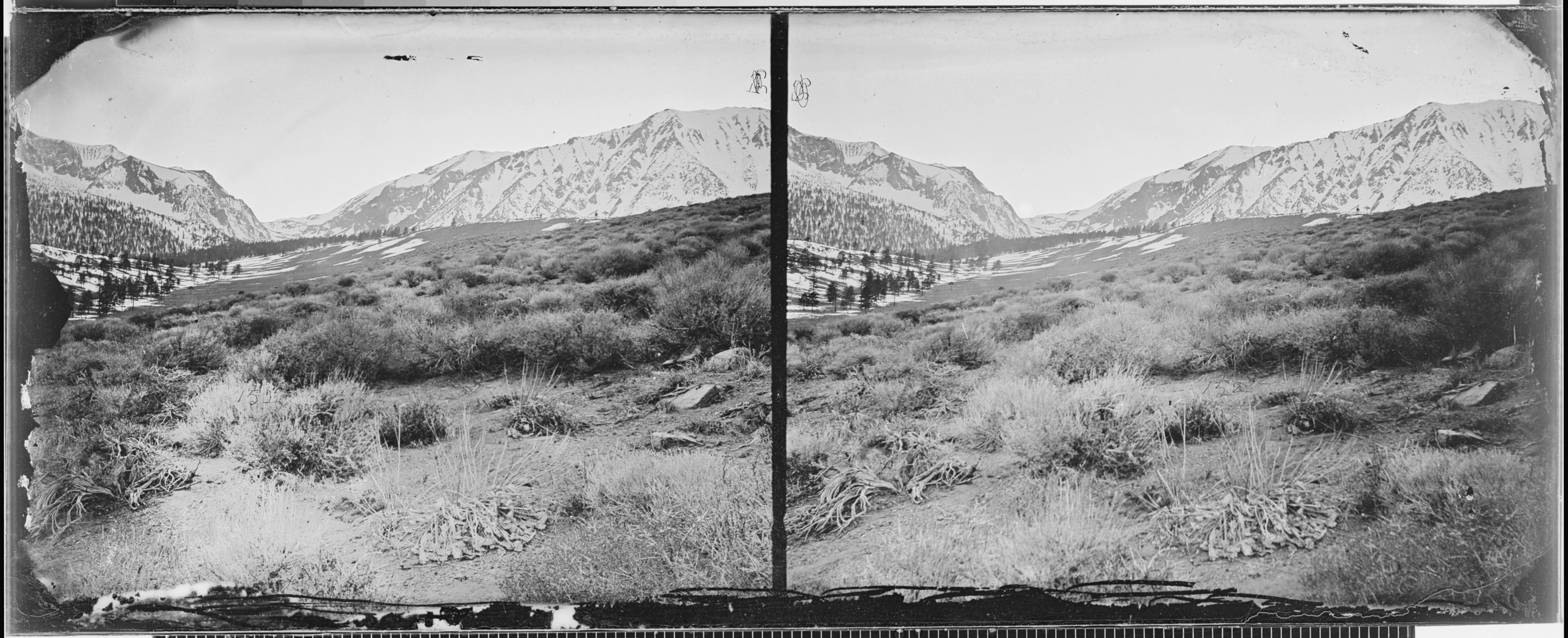
Historical image

The canyon was so named from the blood shed by work horses on the jagged rocks on the canyon's steep trails.
