= Spice Girls filmography =

English pop girl group the Spice Girls have starred in one feature film, as well as several television specials, documentaries and commercials. They made their film debut in 1997, starring in their feature film Spice World. The film was a commercial success, but was widely panned by critics, earning the group the Golden Raspberry Award for Worst Actress.

The Spice Girls have hosted various television specials. In November 1997, the Spice Girls became the first pop group to host ITV's An Audience with...; their show featured an all-female audience and was watched by 11.8 million viewers in the UK, one fifth of the country's total population. On Christmas Eve that year, the group presented a Spice Girls on Top of the Pops television special on BBC One. Concert specials of their three tours in the late 1990s were also broadcast. On Christmas Day 1997, ITV aired a concert special titled Spice Up Your Christmas, which consisted of highlights from the Spice Girls' October 1997 concert in Istanbul. The Spice Girls In Concert - Wild! pay-per-view concert special of the group's October 1997 show in Istanbul aired on various dates throughout 1998 in the US on Showtime. Its first airing on 17 January 1998 was the highest-rated music pay-per-view in seven years. The concert was aired again in the US on Fox Family Channel on 16 August 1998, receiving a 1.8 household rating despite being up against a four-hour Spice Girls MTV special and a different pay-per-view Spice Girls concert airing the same weekend. In September 1998, a television special titled Spice Girls: Live in Your Living Room was aired on Sky One. In it, Dani Behr and Georgie Stait presented live coverage of the Spice Girls' concert at Wembley Stadium, including a live fan call-in segment, interview footage with the group, and in-studio guests, followed by a live broadcast of the full concert. In 1999, a television special of the group's concert at Earl's Court titled Spice Girls: The Live One was broadcast in various countries and also included a documentary containing rehearsals and interviews with the Spice Girls.

The Spice Girls have released at least seven official behind-the-scenes television documentaries, including two tour documentaries and two making-of documentaries for their film Spice World. December 1997 was the release of their first official US television documentary Too Much Is Never Enough on UPN. The documentary focused on their reaction to their sudden rise to fame around the world, and was watched by 5.4 million viewers. In December 2007, the official documentary, Spice Girls: Giving You Everything, made its world premiere in Australia on FOX8. It aired on CTV in Canada on 19 December 2007, and on BBC One in the United Kingdom on 31 December 2007. The documentary attracted 3.5 million viewers in the UK, coming in second in its timeslot. In December 2012, the official documentary The Spice Girls' Story: Viva Forever! was aired on ITV to promote the group's West End musical "Viva Forever". The Spice Girls have also been the subject of a number of unofficial documentaries. In March 2001, ITV aired an unauthorised documentary about the Spice Girls titled Raw Spice. The film, which focused on the group before they became famous and featured never before seen footage of them from 1994, was the subject of four-year-long legal disputes with former members of the film's production company and the Spice Girls themselves, who tried to prevent it from being screened. The documentary was the most-watched program of the night that it aired, drawing 9.4 million viewers—almost 40% of the available audience. The Spice Girls have had episodes dedicated to them in several music biography series, including VH1's Behind the Music, E! True Hollywood Story, and MTV's BioRhythm.

The Spice Girls have appeared and performed in numerous television shows and events. In February 1997, the Spice Girls opened the 1997 Brit Awards with Geri Halliwell wearing the iconic Union Jack dress whilst performing onstage with the group. Their performance won Most Memorable Performance Of 30 Years at the 2010 Brit Awards. The band performed again at the 2000 Brit Awards, where they were presented with the Lifetime Achievement Award by Will Smith. Other notable appearances include Saturday Night Live (SNL), The Oprah Winfrey Show and two Royal Variety Performances. In June 1998, the group also performed their songs "Stop" and "Viva Forever" live with Luciano Pavarotti at his Pavarotti & Friends for the Children of Liberia benefit concert in Italy. The Spice Girls performed at the 2000 MTV Europe Music Awards; it was the group's last performance before their split in December that year, until their 2007 reunion. The first public performance by the Spice Girls during their 2007 reunion was made at the Kodak Theatre in Hollywood, where the group performed at the Victoria's Secret Fashion Show. They performed two songs, 1998 single "Stop" and the lead single from their greatest hits album, "Headlines (Friendship Never Ends)". The show was broadcast in December 2007, and was watched by 7.4 million viewers on CBS and 2.94 million viewers on The CW. In August 2012, after much speculation and anticipation from the press and the public, the group performed a medley of "Wannabe" and "Spice Up Your Life" at the 2012 Summer Olympics closing ceremony, reuniting solely for the event. Their performance became the most tweeted moment of the entire Olympics with over 116,000 tweets on Twitter per minute.

The Spice Girls have also starred in television commercials as part of their endorsement deals with several brands. In 1997 and 1998, they starred in commercials for Pepsi, Polaroid, Walkers Crisps, Impulse and Aprilia. For their 2007 reunion, the group starred in two commercials for British supermarket chain Tesco during the Christmas season. One of their Tesco commercials ranked number four in the "Top 10 ads with the highest recall of 2008" in Marketing Week's annual Adwatch rankings.

In 2019, Paramount Animation announced plans to release an animated Spice Girls film that would feature both new and classic music. The film is currently in development and is scheduled for a 2020 release. Simon Fuller is set to produce the film, with Karen McCullah and Kiwi Smith writing the screenplay. A director has not yet been announced.

== Feature films ==
Title	Year	Credit(s)	Role	Director(s)	Box office	Ref.
Spice World	1997	Actress	The Spice Girls	Bob Spiers	$151,000,000	

== Television ==
=== Specials ===
Title	Year	Role	Network	Notes	Ref.
Top of the Pops	1996	Host, performer	BBC One	Christmas Day special	
Comic Relief	1997	Themselves, various sketches and performances	BBC One	Television special	
Channel 5 launch	1997	Themselves	Channel 5	Launch of Britain's fifth terrestrial television network	
Spice Girls: Year One - An O-Zone Special	1997	Themselves	BBC Two	Television special	
MTV's Spice Girls Survival Guide	1997	Themselves	MTV Southeast Asia	Television special	
An Audience with...The Spice Girls	1997	Host, performer	ITV	Television special	
Spice Girls: MTV Up For It Special	1997	Themselves	MTV UK	Television special	
Spice Girls: Too Much Is Never Enough	1997	Themselves	UPN	Documentary	
Spice Girls on Top of the Pops	1997	Host, performer	BBC One	Christmas Eve special	
Behind the Scenes of Spiceworld – The Movie	1997	Themselves	Channel 5	Spice World documentary	
Spice Up Your Christmas	1997	Themselves	ITV	Christmas Day concert special	
All That	1998	Themselves ("Show & Tell" sketch), Musical guest	Nickelodeon	"Spice Girls" (Season 4, Episode 8)	
The Spice Girls In Concert - Wild!	1998	Themselves	Showtime	Pay-per-view concert special	
Spice Girls: An MTV Movie Special	1998	Themselves	MTV	Spice World documentary	
Spice Girls—Wild! in Concert	1998	Themselves	Fox Family Channel	Concert special	
FANatic	1998	Themselves	MTV	"Spice Girls" (Season 1, Episode 18)	
Spice Girls: Girl Power A–Z	1998	Host	MTV	Television special	
The Essential: Spice Girls	1998	Themselves	MTV	Documentary	
Ruby Wax meets...	1998	Themselves	BBC One	"The Spice Girls" (Season 3, Episode 1)	
MTV's Ultrasound: Sugar, Spice & Everything Nice	1998	Themselves	MTV	Documentary	
TFI Friday	1998	Themselves	Channel 4	"Spice Girls Special" (Series 3, Episode 9)	
Miami Spice	1998	Themselves	Fox Kids	Tour documentary	
Spice Girls...After Geri, An O-Zone Special	1998	Themselves	BBC Two	Television special	
Spice Girls' Favorite Videos	1998	Themselves	MTV	Television special	
Spice Girls: Live in Your Living Room	1998	Themselves	Sky Cinema Box Office	Pay-per-view concert special	
French and Saunders	1998	Themselves ("Fatsuit" sketch)	BBC Two	"Titanic" (Christmas special)	
Spice Girls in America: A Tour Story	1999	Themselves	Channel 4	Tour documentary	
Pop Galerie	1999	Themselves (archive footage)	Arte	Documentary (French/German), "Spice Girls"	
Spice Girls: The Live One	1999	Themselves	Sky 1, Fox Kids, SRF zwei	Concert special	
TFI Friday	2000	Host	Channel 4	"The Spice Girls" (Season 6, Episode 1)	
BIOrhythm	2000	Themselves (archive footage)	MTV	Documentary, "Spice Girls" (Season 1, Episode 30)	
Spice Girls on Film	2000	Themselves (archive footage)	Channel 4	Documentary	
Raw Spice	2001	Themselves (archive footage)	ITV	Documentary	
Solo Spice	2001	Themselves (archive footage)	Channel 4	Documentary	
E! True Hollywood Story	2001	Themselves (archive footage)	E!	Documentary, "Spice Girls" (Season 6, Episode 1)	
Seven Days That Shook the Spice Girls	2002	Themselves (archive footage)	Channel 4	Documentary	
Behind the Music	2003	Themselves (archive footage)	VH1	Documentary, "Spice Girls" (Season 7, Episode 2)	
Giving You Everything	2007	Themselves	BBC One, CTV, FOX8	Documentary	
The Birth of the Spice Girls	2007	Themselves (archive footage)	Sky Living	Documentary	
The Spice Girls on Trial	2007	Themselves (archive footage)	Channel 5	Documentary	
The Spice Girls' Story: Viva Forever!	2012	Themselves	ITV	Documentary	
Nineties	2013	Themselves (archive footage)	SVT	Documentary (Swedish), "Girl Power!" (Season 1, Episode 7)	
Spice Girls Superfans	2016	Themselves (archive footage)	BBC iPlayer	Documentary	
Spice Girls: Breaking The Band	2019	Themselves (archive footage)	Reelz	Documentary	
Spice Girls: How Girl Power Changed Britain	2021	Themselves (archive footage)	Channel 4	Documentary	
The Spice Girls at the BBC	2021	Themselves (archive footage)	BBC Two	Documentary	

=== Interviews/performances ===
This list is selective; the Spice Girls have appeared, performed and been interviewed in numerous television shows worldwide. For a more complete list, see their filmographies on IMDB and BFI.

Title	Year	Role	Network	Performed song(s)	Notes	Ref.
Brit Awards	1997	Performer	ITV	"Wannabe"' "Who Do You Think You Are"		
An Audience with...Elton John	1997	Special guest (performance)	ITV	"Don't Go Breaking My Heart" (with Elton John)	Television special	
The Prince's Trust Royal Gala	1997	Performer	BBC One	"Say You'll Be There"; "Mama"	Variety show	
Saturday Night Live	1997	Musical guest	NBC	"Wannabe"; "Say You'll Be There"	"Rob Lowe/Spice Girls" (Season 22, Episode 17)	
MTV Video Music Awards	1997	Performer	MTV	"Say You'll Be There"		
MTV Europe Music Awards	1997	Performer	MTV	"Spice Up Your Life"		
Royal Variety Performance	1997	Performer	MTV	"Who Do You Think You Are"; "Too Much"	Variety show	
The Oprah Winfrey Show	1998	Themselves (interview and performances)	Syndicated	"Wannabe"; "Spice Up Your Life"	(Season 12)	
American Music Awards	1998	Performer (pre-recorded)	ABC	"Too Much"		
Brit Awards	1998	Performer	ITV	"Stop"		
Pavarotti & Friends for the Children of Liberia	1998	Performer	Syndicated	"Stop"; "Viva Forever"	"Great Performances"	
Children in Need	1998	Performer	BBC One, BBC Two	"Goodbye"		
Royal Variety Performance	1998	Performer	BBC One	"Goodbye"	Variety show	
Brit Awards	2000	Lifetime achievement award honoree, performer	ITV	"Spice Up Your Life"; "Say You'll Be There"; "Holler"; "Goodbye"		
MTV Europe Music Awards	2000	Performer	ITV	"Holler"		
Victoria's Secret Fashion Show	2007	Performer	CBS	"Stop"; "Headlines (Friendship Never Ends)"	Fashion show	
Children in need	2007	Performer	BBC One, BBC Two	"Stop"; "Headlines (Friendship Never Ends)"		
Strictly Come Dancing	2007	Performer	BBC One	"2 Become 1"	Dance contest (Season 5, Week 12: Final)	
2012 Summer Olympics closing ceremony	2012	Performer	Worldwide broadcast	"Wannabe"; "Spice Up Your Life"	"A Symphony of British Music"	

== Commercials ==
Company	Year	Promoting	Title	Theme song(s)	Director	Region	Ref.
Pepsi-cola	1997	Soft drink beverage	"Generation Next" v.1	"Move Over"	Samuel Bayer	International	
Pepsi-cola	1997	Soft drink beverage	"Generation next" v.2	"Move Over"	Unknown	International	
Pepsi-cola	1997	Soft drink beverage, "Step to Me"	"Generation next" v.3	"Move Over"	Unknown	International	
Walkers Crisps	1997	Crisps	"No more Mr Spice Guy" v.1	—N/a	Paul Weiland	United Kingdom	
Walkers Crisps	1997	Walkers "Cheese and Chive" crisps	"No more Mr Spice Guy" v.2	—N/a	Paul Weiland	United Kingdom	
Impulse	1997	Impulse Spice (body spray)	"Wear nothing but Impulse Spice"	"Spice Up Your Life"	Jeff Stark	International	
Polaroid	1997	Polaroid Extreme 600 film		—N/a	Harald Zwart	United Kingdom	
Polaroid	1997 - 1998	Spice Cam	"School"	—N/a	Harald Zwart	United Kingdom	
Look magazine	1997	"Spice Girls" issue	Unknown	—N/a	Unknown	United Kingdom	
Aprilia	1998	'Spice Sonic' Scooters	"Spice Sonic Effect"	"Stop"	Unknown	Europe	
Tesco	2007–08	Christmas advert	"Secret Santa"	—N/a	Neil Harris	United Kingdom	
Tesco	2007–08	Christmas advert	"The Perfect Christmas"	—N/a	Neil Harris	United Kingdom	
Walkers Crisps	2019	Crisps		—N/a	MJ Delaney	United Kingdom	
