= Seven Days That Shook the Spice Girls =

2002 British television documentary film

- Directed by: Chris Wilson
- Starring: Spice Girls (archival footage)
- Country of origin: United Kingdom
- Original language: English

Production
- Production company: Yorkshire Television

Original release
- Network: Channel 4
- Release: 10 September 2002

Seven Days That Shook the Spice Girls is a 2002 unofficial British documentary film about British girl group the Spice Girls. The film looks at seven key moments in the band's history, including their formation, Top of the Pops magazine giving them their nicknames, firing their manager Simon Fuller and Geri Halliwell's departure.

== Release ==
The film premiered on Channel 4 on 10 September 2002, and was watched by an audience of 2.08 million.

== Critical response ==
Writing for The Guardian, Gareth McLean thought the film was "lightweight and disposable", and did not do the "bona fide pop culture phenomenon" of the Spice Girls justice. Joe Joseph of The Times agreed that the film was insubstantial, calling it a "speedy, cost-efficient way to interleave stock library footage with quotes from DJs and showbiz journalists in order to fill gaps in the late summer schedules." The Independent's Thomas Sutcliffe felt the airing of the film on the same week as the first anniversary of the September 11 attacks was ill-timed, and described the film as "a scrappy collage of warmed-over gossip and underpowered revelation."

== See also ==
- Spice Girls filmography
