= Spice Girls Ltd v Aprilia World Service BV =

2002 English contract law case on misrepresentation by conduct

- Court: Court of Appeal
- Decided: 24 January 2002
- Citation: [2002] E.M.L.R. 27

Court membership
- Judges sitting: Sir Andrew Morritt VC, Chadwick LJ, and Rix LJ

Keywords
- Misrepresentation; Music Industry

Spice Girls Ltd v Aprilia World Service BV [2002] EWCA Civ 15 is the leading English contract law case concerning misrepresentation by conduct. In summary, misrepresentation by conduct conveys information amounting to a fact, causing a breach of contract. In this case, the Spice Girls had misrepresented Aprilia World Service BV by providing a positive representation that the group of five were to stay together for the foreseeable future by participating in sponsorship activities, when this was not true. As a result, AWS was able to rescind their contract and claim damages.

== Facts ==
The claimants were a British girl group, known as the Spice Girls, which consisted of five members. The respondents, Aprilia World Service BV (AWS), were a vehicle manufacturer, producing mopeds, motorcycles, and scooters. AWS approached the Spice Girls in February 1998 wishing to sponsor their world tour, which was later agreed to in March 1998. The agreement included the rights to sell a limited edition Spice Sonic scooter, access to the group to film and distribute a commercial on MTV, and to distribute other sponsorship materials. The sponsorship was announced on March 8th 1998 via a press conference in Milan. However, AWS complained that the group had been unmotivated, making them disappointed with the events that had taken place for the sponsorship. As a result, on March 30th, the Spice Girls' sponsorship consultants, KLP, wrote a fax to AWS stating the Spice Girls were fully committed to the sponsorship. On May 4th, the group participated in the filming of the TV commercial originally agreed to. An agreement signed May 6th described the Spice Girls as currently consisting of five members and AWS was to pay £400,000 in three installments and £112,500 in royalties. The original agreement was £450,000, however, a £50,000 fee was deducted when the TV commercial was cancelled on April 25th (later shot on May 4th instead).

However, on the March 9th 1998, Geri Halliwell announced privately to the group her intention to leave once they had completed their world tour, the Spiceworld Tour, yet the group did not take her seriously. On April 25th 1998, the group confirmed with their manager that Halliwell was leaving by the end of September 1998. This was kept confidential and neither KLP or AWS were informed. It later became public that Halliwell was leaving in May 1998, and AWS provided evidence they would not have entered into the agreement should they have known Halliwell was leaving in September 1998.

The Spice Girls sought to recover non-payment over the third installment of sponsorship fees and royalty payments, and the delivery of two motorbikes and a scooter. They sought £218,000. The defendants, AWS, counterclaimed arguing that the Spice Girls had misrepresented them as to the nature of the formation of the group as AWS was under the impression that no individual was leaving the group.

== Judgement ==
The Court of Appeal for England and Wales held for AWS, stating that the Spice Girls had misrepresented AWS by conduct as the whole group's participation in the commercial shoots, such as the TV advertisement, amounted to positive representation that the group was staying together for the foreseeable future. The judge granted AWS £434,000 in damages. The additional £1.6m claim for breach of contract was dismissed. In addition, AWS was not required to provide credit to the Spice Girls for the sponsorship as there was no evidence to suggest a rise or enhancement in sales outside of Italy.
