= Giving You Everything =

- Also known as: Spice Girls: Giving You Everything
- Created by: Spice Girls
- Directed by: Bob Smeaton
- Starring: Spice Girls
- Theme music composer: Spice Girls
- Country of origin: United Kingdom
- Original language: English

Production
- Producer: Martin R. Smith
- Running time: 60 minutes

Original release
- Release: 31 December 2007

Spice Girls: Giving You Everything is a 2007 British documentary film released to coincide with the 2007 reunion tour of the British all-female pop group the Spice Girls. It mixes archived film footage with more recent interviews.

== Summary ==
The documentary is centred on the Spice Girls and their creation, rise to fame, exit of member Geri Halliwell, break-up and reunion. The film features narrative insight and commentary from the five girls themselves.

The title of the documentary comes from chorus lyrics from the group's UK number one single "Say You'll Be There".

== Viewership ==
Directed by Bob Smeaton, the documentary made its world première in Australia on FOX8 on Sunday, 16 December 2007 at 7:30pm. It later aired in Canada on 19 December 2007 (on the CTV); in New Zealand on 24 December 2007; and on the BBC in the United Kingdom on 31 December 2007.

The film attracted 3.6 million viewers in the UK, overnight figures suggest. It came second in the timeslot, losing out only to popular soap opera Coronation Street on ITV.

== Cast ==
- Geri Halliwell
- Mel B
- Emma Bunton
- Melanie C
- Victoria Beckham

== See also ==
- Spice Girls filmography
