= Pavarotti & Friends for the Children of Liberia =

Pavarotti & Friends For The Children Of Liberia

Live album by Luciano Pavarotti and Various Artists
- Released: October 12, 1998
- Recorded: June 9, 1998
- Venue: Parco Novi Sad (Modena, Italy)
- Length: 73:05
- Label: Decca (USA)
- Producer: Phil Ramone

Pavarotti & Friends for the Children of Liberia is a live album by Luciano Pavarotti, with each track featuring a different artist.

In June 1998, Pavarotti hosted a benefit concert in his home town of Modena, Italy, as part of the Pavarotti & Friends concert series. This concert was in support of the War Child charity, specifically to benefit the orphans of war-torn Liberia. The concert was directed by Spike Lee and featured performances by various musical acts including Pavarotti, Stevie Wonder, Celine Dion, Jon Bon Jovi, Spice Girls, Trisha Yearwood, Eros Ramazzotti and The Corrs. The concert was broadcast in various countries and also released as a live album and DVD.

== Track listing ==
1. "Let It Rain" - (with Jon Bon Jovi, Corale Voci Bianche, Liberian Children's Choir, Jill Dell'Abate, Karen Kamon, Vaneese Thomas, Steve Gadd, Pino Palladino, Rob Mathes (guitar), Robbi)
2. "Stop" - (Spice Girls)
3. "How Do I Live" - (Trisha Yearwood, Jill Dell'Abate, Karen Kamon, Curtis King)
4. "I Hate You Then I Love You" - (with Céline Dion)
5. "Higher Ground" - (Stevie Wonder)
6. "'O surdato 'nnammurato" - (with The Corrs)
7. "Se bastasse una canzone" - (with Eros Ramazzotti, Steve Gadd, Pino Palladino, Rob Mathes (guitar), Robbie Kondor, L'Orchestra Filarmonica Di Torino, Marco Boemi)
8. "Betcha Never" - (Vanessa Williams)
9. "Viva Forever (Io ci saro)" - (Spice Girls)
10. "Va, pensiero" - (with Zucchero)
11. "Napule è" - (with Pino Daniele)
12. "Une Place Pour Moi" - (Florent Pagny)
13. "Non ti scordar di me" - (with Vanessa Williams)
14. "Tonight" - (with Natalie Cole)
15. "Dreams" - (The Corrs)
16. "Adeste Fideles (O Come, All Ye Faithful)" - (with Trisha Yearwood)
17. "Peace Wanted Just To Be Free" - (with Stevie Wonder)

== Charts ==
=== Weekly charts ===
Chart (1998)	Peak position
Austrian Albums (Ö3 Austria)	18
Belgian Albums (Ultratop Flanders)	47
Belgian Albums (Ultratop Wallonia)	22
Dutch Albums (Album Top 100)	7
French Albums (SNEP)	21
German Albums (Offizielle Top 100)	12
New Zealand Albums (RMNZ)	37
Norwegian Albums (VG-lista)	16
Swiss Albums (Schweizer Hitparade)	18
US Top Classical Albums (Billboard)	1

=== Year-end charts ===
Chart (1998)	Position
Dutch Albums (Album Top 100)	98
