= Spice Girls in America: A Tour Story =

- Directed by: Ian Denyer
- Starring: Spice Girls
- Country of origin: United Kingdom
- Original language: English

Production
- Running time: 78 minutes
- Production companies: Spice Girls Productions; Starfield Productions

Original release
- Network: Channel 4
- Release: 6 June 1999

Spice Girls in America: A Tour Story is a 1999 film documenting British girl group the Spice Girls on the American leg of their Spiceworld Tour.

== Release ==
The film was purchased by Channel 4 in May 1999, and premiered on 6 June 1999.

== Critical response ==
John Dingwall of the Daily Record found the film to be a "dull-as-dishwater look at life on the road with Britain's top-selling band." Stephen Pile of The Daily Telegraph similarly did not like the film, particularly what he saw as the "general wall-to-wall whingeing" of the band members.

== See also ==
- Spice Girls filmography
