= Spiceworld: The Exhibition =

- Type: Museum exhibition
- Theme: Spice Girls
- Website: spicegirlscollection.com

Spiceworld: The Exhibition is a touring museum exhibition displaying a collection of around 5,000 Spice Girls memorabilia and merchandise owned by Liz West, the Guinness World Record holder for the largest collection of Spice Girls memorabilia. The exhibition was launched at Cusworth Hall in Doncaster, England, and has since appeared at museums across the UK, including the Leeds City Museum, Tower Museum and the Watford Colosseum.

== Exhibition contents and history ==
Spiceworld: The Exhibition displays a collection of around 5,000 Spice Girls costumes, footwear, merchandise and memorabilia. It includes outfits the group wore in live performances and concert tours, including several customised platform shoes, as well as a "Sporty Spice" tracksuit contributed by Spice Girl Melanie C. It also includes an extensive range of Spice Girls merchandise. The interactive exhibition allows visitors to sing karaoke, dress up as the Spice Girls, and design a Spice Girls album cover.

The exhibition was first launched at the Cusworth Hall in Doncaster, England, in 2008. West's collection was not displayed in its entirety until the exhibition opened at the Leeds City Museum in 2011. It received almost 50,000 visitors at the Leeds City Museum, making it the best-attended exhibition in the museum's history.

== Locations ==
Museum	Location	Date
Cusworth Hall	Doncaster, England	January–April 2008
Clifton Park and Museum	Rotherham, England	June–September 2008
Leeds City Museum	Leeds, England	January–June 2011
Tower Museum	Derry, Northern Ireland	August–November 2012
Ripley's Believe It or Not! Museum	London, England	March–June 2015
Ripley's Believe It or Not! Museum	Blackpool, England	March–June 2016
Watford Colosseum	Watford, England	July–August 2016
