= Raw Spice =

2001 British television documentary film

- Directed by: Neil Davies
- Starring: Spice Girls (archival footage)
- Country of origin: United Kingdom
- Original language: English

Production
- Running time: 78 minutes
- Production companies: Yorkshire Television; Dai Films Production; Matthew Bowers; Zig Zag Productions

Original release
- Network: ITV
- Release: 21 March 2001

Raw Spice: The Unofficial Story of the Making of the Spice Girls is a 2001 British documentary film about British girl group the Spice Girls. The film focuses on the group before they found success and features previously unreleased footage of them from 1994. Raw Spice also features an interview with Michelle Stephenson, one of the original members of the group who had left before the Spice Girls found fame.

== Development and filming ==
In 1994, filmmaker Neil Davies was looking to make a documentary film about a girl group. He was put in contact with a newly formed group named Touch, who would later go on to become the Spice Girls. There was no guarantee that the group would find success in the music industry at the time, but Davies felt that "even if it's a car crash, it was still a great story." He envisioned the film as "a kind of warning to teenage girls that this is what happens to you in Tin Pan Alley." Davies and co-producer Matthew Bowers filmed the group for four months in 1994; they then tried to sell the project to television networks but were unsuccessful as the networks were not interested in a film about an unknown group. Two years later, after the Spice Girls' commercial breakthrough, the footage Davies and Bowers had shot was allegedly stolen by two former colleagues. This led to a four-year legal dispute over ownership of the footage that ended in Davies's favour. Davies was then commissioned by ITV to create a documentary about the Spice Girls from the filmed footage.

== Release ==
Prior to airing, the film was the subject of four-year-long legal disputes with former members of the film's production company and the Spice Girls themselves, who tried to prevent it from being screened.

Raw Spice first aired in the UK on 21 March 2001 on ITV. It was the most-watched program of the night, drawing 9.4 million viewers—almost 40% of the available audience. The film aired in Australia on Network 10 in April 2001. Raw Spice was also released on DVD with additional footage.

== Critical response ==
Entertainment Weekly's Tanner Stransky gave the documentary film a B minus. The Calgary Herald gave the film two out of five stars, saying: "If the film had been able to clear more than one day's worth of interview footage from 1994, it may have been a great piece of pop music moviemaking instead of an overly long TV sound byte."

== See also ==
- Spice Girls filmography
