= Spice Girls: How Girl Power Changed Britain =

2021 documentary series about the Spice Girls

- Genre: Documentary
- Directed by: Vari Innes; Alice McMahon-Major; Jessica Ranja
- Starring: Spice Girls (archival footage)
- Country of origin: United Kingdom
- Original language: English
- No. of seasons: 1
- No. of episodes: 3

Production
- Executive producers: Clare Cameron; Mark Raphael; Rob Coldstream
- Editors: Holly Bridcut; Louise Massignat; Justin Badger
- Production company: 72 Films

Original release
- Network: Channel 4

Spice Girls: How Girl Power Changed Britain is a three-part British television documentary produced and directed by Vari Innes, Alice McMahon-Major, and Jessica Ranja. The documentary examines modern feminism in the United Kingdom, particularly "girl power", through the lives and legacy of British girl group the Spice Girls.

The production company 72 Films was commissioned to produce the series by Channel 4 in 2020, under the working title Girl Powered: The Spice Girls. Spice Girls: How Girl Power Changed Britain premiered on Channel 4 from 14 to 28 September 2021.

== Episodes ==
No.	Title	Original release date
1	"Episode 1"	14 September 2021
2	"Episode 2"	21 September 2021
3	"Episode 3"	28 September 2021

== Critical response ==
The premiere received generally positive reviews. The Guardian's Rebecca Nicholson called it a "fabulous and intimate" documentary and gave it four out of five stars. Elizabeth Aubrey of The Independent similarly gave the premiere four out of five stars, finding it to be a "damning" critique of the music industry in the 1990s. James Jackson of The Times gave the episode three out of five stars and concluded that it was "an intelligent bit of back-to-the-1990s nostalgia layered with dismay at the era's laddism." The Daily Telegraph's Kat Brown also gave it three stars, finding the lack of input from the Spice Girls themselves to be a notable omission.
