= Impulse (body mist) =

Perfume body spray

Impulse is a perfume originally manufactured by Fabergé which was part of Unilever, an Anglo-Dutch company based in London, United Kingdom. Introduced as a 'perfume deodorant' in South Africa in 1972, Impulse was launched in the UK towards the end of 1979, including the butterfly design and the slogan "Men can't help acting on Impulse." Impulse perfumes have been developed by Ann Gottlieb, an olfactive consultant credited with having led the development of several successful fragrances.

In 2021, Impulse was spun out from Unilever into the standalone business Elida Beauty. As of 2026, Impulse is owned and produced by Evermark.

== History ==
In the early 1980s, six scents were introduced, in the USA, called "Always Alluring", "Delightfully Daring", "Instantly Innocent", "Mysterious Musk", "Possible Playful", and "Suddenly Sassy". In 1986, three scents were introduced called "Elation", "Electric Musk", and "Temptation". In the late 1980s and early 1990s, two scents were introduced called "Tres LA" and "Night Rhythms" that were both merged with Prince Matchabelli. In 1992, the last scent introduced, in the USA, called "Impressions". In 2006 there were eight fragrances with names such as "Thrill", "Goddess", and "Siren". In addition to the bodyspray, the Impulse brand includes antiperspirants and moisturisers.

In the late 2000s, there have been three new limited edition fragrances available called "The City Collection" and they are called "Paris", "London", and "New York". A re-release of these three fragrances were brought out as "Paris Chic", "London Vibe", and "New York Sass". In 2008, a fragrance called "True Love" has been released.

In 2010, two fragrances from Impulse were released, called "Into Glamour" and "Very Pink" respectively.

== Product ranges ==
There have been different Impulse body spray ranges too, such as the Impulse Shakers range. This range was designed for summer and had slightly different style to normal impulse sprays, as it had a small "ball" inside the can for "shaking" the ingredients up together before spraying. It came in fragrances like "Berry Crush", "Frangipani Fling", "Melon Madness", and "Tropical Breeze". Another interesting branch out for Impulse was the "water resistant" formula "Summer Splash".

In Australia the fragrances varied slightly in name. From 1988 these included "Spellbound", "Mischief", "Midnight", "Temptation", "Inspiration", "On Fire", "Impressions", "Merely Musk", and "Incense". Two of these 20-odd year old fragrances are still available in Australia today: "Merely Musk" and "Incense".

== Promotion ==
In the summer of 1997, the Spice Girls became spokesmodels for the Impulse body sprays edition known as "Impulse Spice", while on tour promoting their two albums, Spice and Spiceworld. Stars of Impulse commercials include Neil Morrissey and Emma Harrison. Impulse's 1998 advert Chance Encounter was the first mainstream television advert in Britain and Ireland to feature a gay couple. In 2016, Charli XCX became the spokesperson for three Impulse body sprays limited editions known as "Rock & Love", "Vanilla Kisses", and "Why Not?".
