= Top of the Pops (magazine) =

British magazine

- Editor: Peter Hart
- Categories: Music magazine
- Frequency: monthly
- Total circulation: 36,485 (2022)
- First issue: February 1995; 31 years ago
- Company: Immediate Media Company
- Country: United Kingdom
- Based in: London, England
- Language: English
- Website: www.totpmag.com

Top of the Pops magazine was a British monthly publication published by Immediate Media Company. It featured star gossip, fashion and beauty advice, quizzes and posters. It started as a supplementary magazine for the BBC television programme Top of the Pops, which stopped producing weekly shows in 2006. The magazine and TV show diverged and developed distinctive identities.

The magazine was launched in February 1995 and is famous for giving girl group The Spice Girls their nicknames. Alongside a revamp of the TV show, it was originally marketed as the missing link between Smash Hits and NME, but its format was gradually changed, with less music content and a demographic shift to young girls.

The title had several editors over the years, including Peter Loraine, Corinna Shaffer, Rosalie Snaith and Peter Hart. Contributing editors included Adam Tanswell.

It was reported that Immediate Media would be closing the magazine in October 2022. However, as of July 2026, subscriptions to the monthly magazine are still available.
