= Spice Girls discography =

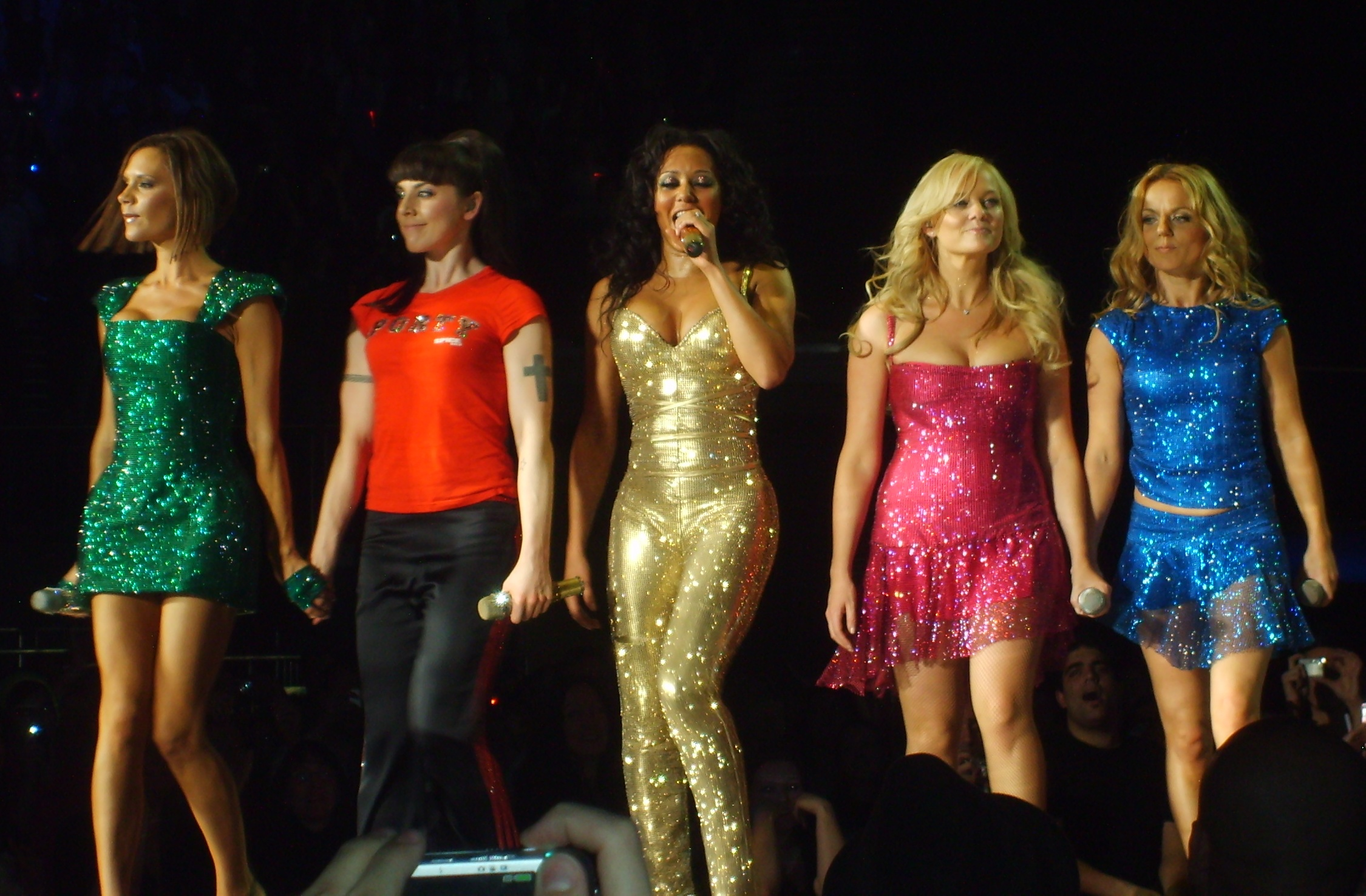
- The Spice Girls performing on their reunion world tour in 2008
- Studio albums: 3
- Extended plays: 1
- Compilation albums: 1
- Singles: 11
- Video albums: 11
- Music videos: 18
- Box sets: 2

The Spice Girls, an English girl group, have released three studio albums, one compilation album, 11 singles and 18 music videos. Formed in 1994, the group was made up of singers Geri Halliwell ("Ginger Spice"), Emma Bunton ("Baby Spice"), Melanie Brown ("Scary Spice"), Melanie Chisholm ("Sporty Spice") and Victoria Beckham ("Posh Spice").

The Spice Girls' debut single, "Wannabe", was released by Virgin Records in the United Kingdom in July 1996. It went to number one in 37 countries worldwide and became the biggest-selling debut single to date. In the UK, it stayed at the top of the UK Singles Chart for seven weeks and went on to sell more than six million copies worldwide. It subsequently topped the Billboard Hot 100 in the United States for four weeks in February 1997. Follow-up singles "Say You'll Be There" and "2 Become 1" also topped the UK chart, the latter becoming the first of three consecutive Christmas #1s. Both songs also reached the top five in the US and across most of Europe. The group's debut album, Spice, was released in the UK in November 1996. It saw success globally, selling two million copies worldwide in its first week, and a total of 10 million copies worldwide in the next seven months. Since its release, Spice has sold 23 million copies worldwide and was certified ten times platinum by the British Phonographic Industry (BPI) in the UK. The fourth Spice Girls single, the double A-side "Mama" / "Who Do You Think You Are", also went to number one in the UK for four weeks.

In November 1997, the group released their second album, Spiceworld, which has been certified eight times platinum by the BPI. The album was preceded by the UK number-one single, "Spice Up Your Life" and, in December, it produced the Spice Girls' second UK Christmas #1, "Too Much". The album's third single "Stop!" was released in March 1998 to coincide with the opening of the Spiceworld Tour. It peaked at number two, ending the group's run of consecutive number-one singles in the UK. In May 1998, while promoting "Viva Forever", the album's fourth and final single, Geri Halliwell left the group, citing depression and personal differences with the band. This departure was a significant news event in 1998. "Viva Forever" became another UK number-one single from Spiceworld and was a success in every market in which it was released. Now a four-piece, in December 1998 the Spice Girls released "Goodbye" as a farewell to Halliwell. The single became the Spice Girls third-consecutive, and last, Christmas #1 in the UK. It was also a major success in Canada and Italy and a hit across the US and the rest of Europe.

As a four-piece, the Spice Girls released their third album, Forever, in November 2000. A sharp departure from their previous pop genre, it peaked at number two in the UK Albums Chart and was certified platinum by the BPI. Forever produced the Spice Girls' last UK number-one single, the double A-side "Holler" / "Let Love Lead the Way". Following the relative commercial and critical downturn of Forever, in December 2000, the four remaining members announced an indefinite hiatus.

In June 2007, all five members of the Spice Girls reunited to tour. A Greatest Hits was released with two new tracks: the single "Headlines (Friendship Never Ends)" and "Voodoo". The album peaked at number two in the UK, and became their first number-one album in Australia. It also peaked within the top ten in Ireland. Greatest Hits was also certified three platinum in the UK.

In 2012, the Official Charts Company revealed the biggest-selling singles artists in British music chart history. The Spice Girls placed at 20th, making them the most commercially successful girl group in UK chart history. They are currently the seventh-biggest group overall, with eight million singles sold in the UK. The Spice Girls have sold 100 million records worldwide.

To mark the 25th anniversary of "Wannabe", an EP of the group's debut single was released in July 2021, including previously unreleased demos. For the 30th anniversary, the box set The Singles Collection was released on 6 November 2026.

== Albums ==
=== Studio albums ===
List of studio albums, with selected chart positions, sales figures and certifications
Title	Album details	Peak chart positions										Sales	Certifications
Title	Album details	UK	AUS	CAN	GER	IRL	NLD	NZ	SWE	SWI	US	Sales	Certifications
Spice	Released: 4 November 1996; Label: Virgin; Formats: CD, cassette, digital download, LP, MiniDisc	1	3	1	6	1	1	1	1	5	1	UK: 3,022,090; US: 7,500,000	BPI: 10× Platinum; ARIA: 6× Platinum; BVMI: 3× Gold; IFPI SWE: 2× Platinum; IFPI SWI: 2× Platinum; IRMA: 9× Platinum; MC: Diamond; NVPI: 3× Platinum; RIAA: 7× Platinum; RMNZ: 7× Platinum
Spiceworld	Released: 3 November 1997; Label: Virgin; Formats: CD, cassette, digital download, LP, MiniDisc	1	2	2	4	1	1	1	3	2	3	UK: 1,600,000; US: 4,200,000	BPI: 5× Platinum; ARIA: 6× Platinum; IFPI SWE: 2× Platinum; IFPI SWI: 2× Platinum; BVMI: Platinum; MC: Diamond; NVPI: Platinum; RIAA: 4× Platinum
Forever	Released: 1 November 2000; Label: Virgin; Formats: CD, cassette, digital download, LP, MiniDisc	2	9	6	6	15	30	25	24	11	39	UK: 271,000; US: 207,000	BPI: Platinum; ARIA: Gold; BVMI: Gold; IFPI SWI: Platinum; MC: 2× Platinum; NVPI: Gold; RMNZ: Gold

=== Compilation albums ===
List of compilation albums, with selected chart positions, sales figures and certifications
Title	Album details	Peak chart positions										Sales	Certifications
Title	Album details	UK	AUS	CAN	GER	IRL	NLD	NZ	SWE	SWI	US	Sales	Certifications
Greatest Hits	Released: 7 November 2007; Label: Virgin; Formats: CD, CD+DVD, digital download, LP, SHM-CD	2	1	11	50	3	73	15	50	52	93 (Note: In the United States, the album was initially only available through Victoria's Secret stores owing to an exclusive deal between the group and the lingerie brand. More than 600,000 copies of Greatest Hits were sold through Victoria's Secret stores in the first week of release and the sales were not eligible for the Billboard charts owing to Victoria's Secret not being SoundScan enabled.)	UK: 900,000; US: 600,000	BPI: 3× Platinum; ARIA: Platinum; IRMA: Platinum; MC: Gold; RMNZ: Gold

=== Box sets ===
Title	Details	Peak chart positions
Title	Details	UK
Spice/Spiceworld	Released: 27 April 2004; Label: Virgin; Format: CD	—
The Singles Collection	Released: 6 November 2026; Label: UM^{e}, Virgin; Format: CD, digital download, LP, streaming	74

== EPs ==
Title	Details
Spice Up Your Xmas!	Released: 7 November 2025; Label: UM^{e}; Format: Digital download; streaming

== Singles ==
=== As lead artist ===
List of singles, with selected chart positions and certifications, showing year released and album name
Single	Year	Peak chart positions										Certifications	Album
Single	Year	UK	AUS	FRA	GER	IRL	NLD	NZ	SWE	SWI	US	Certifications	Album
"Wannabe"	1996	1	1	1	1	1	1	1	1	1	1	BPI: 5× Platinum; ARIA: 2× Platinum; BVMI: Platinum; IFPI SWE: Gold; IFPI SWI: Gold; NVPI: Gold; RIAA: Platinum; RMNZ: 4× Platinum; SNEP: Diamond	Spice
"Say You'll Be There"	1996	1	12	2	16	2	5	2	4	4	3	BPI: 2× Platinum; ARIA: Gold; RIAA: Gold; RMNZ: Gold; SNEP: Gold	Spice
"2 Become 1"	1996	1	2	4	13	1	2	3	7	10	4	BPI: 2× Platinum; ARIA: Platinum; RIAA: Gold; RMNZ: Gold; SNEP: Gold	Spice
"Mama" / "Who Do You Think You Are"	1997	1	13	16	4	1	3	6	5	6	—	BPI: Platinum; BVMI: Gold; NVPI: Gold; RIAA: Gold; RMNZ: Gold; SNEP: Gold	Spice
"Spice Up Your Life"	1997	1	8	3	14	2	4	2	2	5	18	BPI: 2× Platinum; ARIA: Platinum; IFPI SWE: Platinum; NVPI: Gold; RIAA: Gold; RMNZ: Platinum; SNEP: Gold	Spiceworld
"Too Much"	1997	1	9	20	21	4	15	9	18	18	9	BPI: Platinum; ARIA: Gold; RMNZ: Gold; SNEP: Gold	Spiceworld
"Stop"	1998	2	5	12	35	3	6	9	8	20	16	BPI: Platinum; ARIA: Gold; RMNZ: Platinum; SNEP: Gold	Spiceworld
"Viva Forever"	1998	1	2	18	4	2	7	1	6	3	—	BPI: Platinum; ARIA: Platinum; BVMI: Gold; IFPI SWE: Gold; IFPI SWI: Gold; RMNZ: Platinum; SNEP: Gold	Spiceworld
"Goodbye"	1998	1	3	21	17	1	5	1	2	8	11	BPI: Platinum; ARIA: Platinum; IFPI SWE: Gold; RIAA: Gold; RMNZ: Platinum	Forever
"Holler" / "Let Love Lead the Way"	2000	1	2	44	17	3	12	2	8	15	— (Note: "Holler" did not enter the Billboard Hot 100, but peaked at number 12 on the Bubbling Under Hot 100 Singles chart.)	BPI: Silver; ARIA: Platinum; RMNZ: Gold	Forever
"Headlines (Friendship Never Ends)"	2007	11	74	—	46	29	52	—	3	—	90		Greatest Hits
"—" denotes releases that did not chart or were not released in that territory.

=== As featured artist ===
List of featured singles
Single	Year	Peak chart positions		Album
Single	Year	UK	SWI	Album
"(How Does It Feel to Be) On Top of the World" (among England United)	1998	9	—	Non-album singles
"It's Only Rock 'n Roll (But I Like It)" (among Artists for Children's Promise)	1999	19	92	Non-album singles
"—" denotes releases that did not chart or were not released in that territory.

=== Promotional singles ===
Title	Year	Album
"Sleigh Ride"	1996	"2 Become 1" CD single
"Step to Me"	1997	Pepsi promo single
"Move Over"	1997	Spiceworld and Pepsi promo
"My Strongest Suit"	1999	Elton John and Tim Rice's Aida
"Tell Me Why"	2000	Forever
"Weekend Love"	2000	Forever
"If You Wanna Have Some Fun"	2000	Forever
"Voodoo"	2007	Greatest Hits
"Say You'll Be There" (7" radio mix)	2021	Spice25
"Step to Me" (7" mix)	2022	Spiceworld 25
"Spice Up Your Life" (live in Arnhem, Netherlands / 1998)	2022	Spiceworld 25
"Do You Think About Me" (demo)	2026	The Singles Collection

== Songwriting and other appearances ==
=== Albums ===
Title	Details	Certifications	Credit(s)
Spice Girls Present... The Best Girl Power Album... Ever!	Released: 5 May 1997; Label: Virgin; Formats: CD; Peak chart positions: #2 (UK)	BPI: Gold	Compiler

=== Songs ===
Song	Year	Artist	Album	Credit(s)
"Wannabe (A Smurf Star)"	1997	Cast of The Smurfs	Smurf Hits '97	Co-writer
"Two Become One"	1998	Lester Bowie	The Odyssey of Funk & Popular Music	Co-writer
"Wannabe"	1998	Snuff	Schminkie Minkie Pinkie	Co-writer
"Stop" (Live)	1998	Spice Girls	Pavarotti & Friends for the Children of Liberia (Note: The Spice Girls performed live at the Pavarotti & Friends for the Children of Liberia benefit concert in June 1998. Their performance was included in the resulting compilation album and DVD.)	Co-writer and vocalist
"Viva Forever (Io ci saro)" (Live)	1998	Spice Girls and Luciano Pavarotti	Pavarotti & Friends for the Children of Liberia	Co-writer and vocalist
"Walk of Life"	1998	Spice Girls	Sabrina, the Teenage Witch	Co-writer and vocalist
"Too Much"	1999	Sly and Robbie	Hail Up Taxi, Vol. 2	Co-writer
"Polka Power!"	1999	"Weird Al" Yankovic	Running with Scissors	Co-writer
"2 Become 1"	2000	Paul Gilbert	Alligator Farm	Co-writer
"Sleigh Ride"	2000	Spice Girls	Now! The Christmas Album	Vocalist
"Christmas Wrapping"	2000	Spice Girls	Now! The Christmas Album	Vocalist
"Wannabe"	2004	Spice Girls	Sleepover	Co-writer and vocalist
"Wannabe"	2004	Zebrahead	Waste of MFZB	Co-writer
"Wannabe"	2005	Joan Cusack and Steve Zahn	Chicken Little	Co-writer
"2 Become 1"	2007	Sitti	My Bossa Nova	Co-writer
"Spice Up Your Life"	2009	Zebrahead	Panty Raid	Co-writer
"Wannabe"	2012	Spice Girls	American Reunion	Co-writer and vocalist
"Wannabe"	2012	Danny Jacobs	Madagascar 3: Europe's Most Wanted	Co-writer
"Wannabe / Spice Up Your Life"	2012	Spice Girls	A Symphony of British Music	Co-writer and vocalist
"Wannabe (Glee Cast Version)"	2014	Cast of Glee	The Complete Season Four	Co-writer
"Say You'll Be There"	2014	MØ	No Mythologies to Follow	Co-writer
"Wannabe"	2016	J3PO	The 90s EP	Co-writer
"Spice Girl" (Note: The song contains a sample of "Wannabe" and the Spice Girls are therefore credited as co-writers.)	2017	Aminé	Good for You	Co-writer
"Spice Up Your Life"	2017	Patent Pending	Other People's Greatest Hits	Co-writer
"Spicy" (Note: The song heavily interpolates "Wannabe" and the Spice Girls are therefore credited as co-writers.)	2019	Herve Pagez and Diplo (featuring Charli XCX)	Non-album single	Co-writer
"2 Become 1"	2019	Emma Bunton and Robbie Williams	My Happy Place	Co-writer
"Wannabe"	2021	Peter Stampfel	Peter Stampfel's 20th Century	Co-writer
"Wannabe"	2021	Spice Girls	To All the Boys: Always and Forever (Music from the Netflix Film)	Co-writer and vocalist

== Videography ==
=== Video albums ===
Title	Details	Certifications
5 Go Mad in Cyberspace	Released: 1996; Label: Virgin; Format: CD-ROM	
One Hour of Girl Power	Released: 14 April 1997; Label: Virgin; Format: VHS	BPI: 13× Platinum; MC: 8× Platinum; SNEP: 3× Platinum
Girl Power! Live in Istanbul	Released: 1 December 1997; Label: Virgin; Format: VHS, DVD	BPI: 5× Platinum; RIAA: Platinum; SNEP: Diamond
A Slice of Girl Power!	Released: 1997; Label: Virgin; Format: VHS	
Live at Wembley Stadium	Released: 16 November 1998; Label: Virgin; Formats: VHS, DVD	BPI: Platinum; RIAA: Platinum
Spice Girls in Concert: Wild!	Released: 1998; Label: Showtime; Format: VHS	
Spice Girls in America: A Tour Story	Released: 7 June 1999; Label: Virgin; Formats: VHS	
Forever More	Released: 13 November 2000; Label: Virgin; Formats: VHS, DVD	
Karaoke Video Collection	Released: 2000; Label: Virgin; Format: DVD	
Much Music presents Intimate & Interactive	Released: 2000; Label: Detox Record; Format: VHS	
Girlpower Erobert Die Welt	Released: 14 October 2022; Label: Polyband; Format: DVD	

=== Music videos ===
List of music videos, showing year released and director
Title	Year	Director	Notes
"Wannabe"	1996	Johan Camitz	
"Say You'll Be There"	1996	Vaughan Arnell	
"2 Become 1"	1996	Andy Delaney & Monty Whitebloom	
"Mama"	1997	Andy Delaney & Monty Whitebloom	
"Who Do You Think You Are"	1997	Greg Masuak	
"Who Do You Think You Are" (Comic Relief version)	1997	Greg Masuak	
"Spice Up Your Life"	1997	Marcus Nispel	
"Too Much"	1997	Howard Greenhalgh	
"Too Much" (Spice World version)	1997	Howard Greenhalgh	
"Stop"	1998	James Brown	
"(How Does It Feel to Be) On Top of the World?"	1998	—N/a	Among England United
"Viva Forever"	1998	Steve Box	
"Goodbye"	1998	Howard Greenhalgh	
"It's Only Rock 'n Roll (But I Like It)"	1999	—N/a	Among Artists for Children's Promise
"Holler"	2000	Jake Nava	
"Let Love Lead the Way"	2000	Greg Masuak	
"If You Wanna Have Some Fun"	2000	Arnaud Boursain	Montage video
"Headlines (Friendship Never Ends)"	2007	Anthony Mandler	
"Never Give Up on the Good Times"	2022	Kiran Mistry	Montage video
