= The Singles Collection (Spice Girls album) =

2026 album by the Spice Girls

Box set by Spice Girls
- Released: 6 November 2026
- Recorded: 1994–2007
- Genre: Pop
- Length: 818:00
- Labels: UM^{e}; Virgin

Spice Girls chronology
Greatest Hits (2007)	The Singles Collection (2026)

The Singles Collection is a box set by the English girl group Spice Girls, released on November 6, 2026, to commemorate the 30th anniversary of the group. The box set includes the group's singles, B-sides, remixes and demo recordings.

The box set received mixed reviews from critics, with some complimenting the previously unreleased recordings and selected remixes, while others criticized the retail price and limited amount of new material.

== Background ==
The Singles Collection was announced on September 10, 2026, as part of the celebrations marking the 30th anniversary of the Spice Girls' debut album, Spice.

== Packaging ==
The physical edition of the box set was released in a handbag-inspired box finished in white holographic gloss and matt black foil. The CD version includes 14 compact discs containing 160 tracks, bringing together all of the Spice Girls' singles, B-sides, remixes and demo recordings, as well as a 30th-anniversary acrylic charm, postcards and a 32-page booklet featuring messages from the five members and other musicians, including Dua Lipa, Charli XCX, Adele and Beyoncé. The 7-inch vinyl box set, included the same postcards, acrylic charm, booklet with the exception of track listing. It contains 28 songs, across 14 vinyl records.

== Songs ==
The collection includes material from throughout the group's recording career, including songs from their three studio albums, Spice (1996), Spiceworld (1997) and Forever (2000); and the compilation album Greatest Hits (2007). It also features the previously unreleased song "Do You Think About Me", an R&B-influenced ballad originally recorded when the group was known as Touch, with Victoria Beckham on lead vocals. Among the B-sides are "Bumper to Bumper", "One of These Girls", "Sleigh Ride", "Baby Come Round", "Spice Invaders", "Outer Space Girls", "Walk of Life" and "Christmas Wrapping". It includes four previously unreleased demos, among them an early version of "2 Become 1" featuring Beckham singing Melanie Brown's verse, as well as alternate versions of "Mama" and "Love Thing". Other tracks include "Stop" (Backing Track Extra Brass) and "Move Over" (PlayStation Backing Track). The set also features remixes by several producers and artists, including Tony Rich's remix of "Viva Forever" and the Thunderpuss radio instrumental of "Tell Me Why".

== Reception ==
=== Critical response ===
Professional ratings
Review scores
Source	Rating
The Guardian	2/5 stars
Rolling Stone (UK)	4/5 stars

Rolling Stone (UK) described the four new demos as "the heart of the release" and called "Do You Think About Me", "the highlight". He also praised the "Wannabe (Junior Vasquez Remix Edit)", describing it as "tribal and transcendent" and the group's "collective energy caught like lightning in a bottle".

The Guardian criticized the box set's high price and lack of new material, describing it as a "cash-grab box set" and arguing that it offered "some old rope" in exchange for considerable sums of money. They nevertheless praised "Do You Think About Me" calling Victoria's vocal performance as "confident" and noting how she moves "between sweet and steely", and the group's singles, describing "Wannabe" as "loaded with puckish energy", "Say You'll Be There" and "Stop" as "immaculate", and noting that "very few pop bands can rival the ballads on display here".

=== Commercial performance ===
In the group's home country of the United Kingdom, the box set entered at number seventy-four on the UK Albums Chart.

== Track listing ==
CD1 "Wannabe"
No.	Title	Writer(s)	Length
1.	"Wannabe"	Spice Girls; Matt Rowe; Richard Stannard	2:54
2.	"Bumper to Bumper"	Paul Wilson; Andy Watkins; Cathy Dennis	3:42
3.	"Wannabe" (Motiv 8 Vocal Slam Mix)		6:21
4.	"Wannabe" (Motiv 8 Dub Slam Mix)		6:25
5.	"Wannabe" (Dave Way Alternative Mix)		3:26
6.	"Wannabe" (Junior Vasquez Remix edit)		5:57
7.	"Wannabe" (Junior Vasquez Gomis Dub)		6:39
8.	"Wannabe" (Junior Vasquez 7" single edit)		2:54
9.	"Wannabe" (Junior Vasquez 12" Club Mix)		9:18
10.	"Wannabe" (Junior Vasquez Club Dub)		9:17
11.	"Wannabe" (no rap)		2:07
12.	"Wannabe" (Instrumental Slam (Motiv 8 Remix))		6:18
13.	"Wannabe" (instrumental)		2:51
14.	"Wannabe" (karaoke version)		2:53

CD2 "Say You'll Be There"
No.	Title	Writer(s)	Length
1.	"Say You'll Be There" (single mix)	Spice Girls; Eliot Kennedy; Jon B.	3:58
2.	"Take Me Home"	Spice Girls; Wilson; Watkins	4:09
3.	"Say You'll Be There" (single edit)		3:43
4.	"Say You'll Be There" (Junior's Main Pass)		8:35
5.	"Say You'll Be There" (Junior's Dub Girls)		8:30
6.	"Say You'll Be There" (Junior's X Beats)		8:32
7.	"Say You'll Be There" (Junior's X Beats 2007 edit)		6:58
8.	"Say You'll Be There" (Linlee's Extended Mix)		4:10
9.	"Say You'll Be There" (Spice of Life Mix)		7:03
10.	"Say You'll Be There" (7" radio mix)		4:08
11.	"Say You'll Be There" (Kurt's Dub)		4:26
12.	"Say You'll Be There" (instrumental)		3:56
13.	"Say You'll Be There" (karaoke version)		3:53

CD3 "2 Become 1"
No.	Title	Writer(s)	Length
1.	"2 Become 1" (single version)	Spice Girls; Rowe; Stannard	4:05
2.	"One Of These Girls"	Wilson; Watkins	3:33
3.	"Sleigh Ride"	Leroy Anderson; Mitchell Parish	3:19
4.	"2 Become 1" (album version)		4:01
5.	"2 Become 1" (orchestral version)		4:04
6.	"2 Become 1" (Dave Way Remix)		4:05
7.	"Seremos 1 Los 2" (Spanish version)	Rowe; Stannard; N. Maño	3:50
8.	"2 Become 1" (instrumental)		4:03
9.	"2 Become 1" (karaoke version)		4:06

CD4 "Mama" / "Who Do You Think You Are"
No.	Title	Writer(s)	Length
1.	"Mama" (radio version)	Rowe; Stannard; Spice Girls	3:42
2.	"Who Do You Think You Are" (radio version)	Spice Girls; Watkins; Wilson	3:46
3.	"Baby Come Round"	Spice Girls; Watkins; Wilson	3:24
4.	"Mama" (album version)		5:05
5.	"Mama" (Biffco Mix)		5:50
6.	"Mama" (instrumental)		3:47
7.	"Mama" (karaoke version)		3:41
8.	"Who Do You Think You Are" (album version)		4:01
9.	"Who Do You Think You Are" (Morales Club Mix)		9:31
10.	"Who Do You Think You Are" (Morales Dub Mix)		7:00
11.	"Who Do You Think You Are" (Morales Bonus Mix)		4:50
12.	"Who Do You Think You Are" (instrumental)		3:42
13.	"Who Do You Think You Are" (karaoke version)		3:44

CD5 "Step to Me"
No.	Title	Writer(s)	Length
1.	"Step to Me" (7" mix)	Spice Girls; Eliot Kennedy	4:05
2.	"Move Over"	Clifford Lane; Mary Wood; Spice Girls	2:44
3.	"Step to Me" (extended mix)		5:40
4.	"Step to Me" (Matthew's Disco Steppin' Mix)		7:22
5.	"Step to Me" (Matthew's Extra Spicey Dub)		6:34
6.	"Step to Me" (from Spiceworld' Japanese edition)		4:18
7.	"Move Over" (live in Istanbul)		3:38
8.	"Move Over / GeneratioNext" (live)		5:31
9.	"Move Over" (PlayStation backing track)		1:56
10.	"Move Over" (instrumental)		2:43
11.	"Move Over" (karaoke version)		2:47

CD6 "Spice Up Your Life"
No.	Title	Writer(s)	Length
1.	"Spice Up Your Life" (Stent Radio Mix)	Spice Girls; Rowe; Stannard	2:56
2.	"Spice Invaders"	Wilson; Watkins	3:39
3.	"Spice Up Your Life" (Morales Radio Mix)		2:50
4.	"Spice Up Your Life" (Morales Carnival Club Mix)		11:30
5.	"Spice Up Your Life" (Morales Drums & Dub Mix)		11:09
6.	"Spice Up Your Life" (Morales Beats)		5:53
7.	"Spice Up Your Life" (Murk Cuba Libre Mix)		8:07
8.	"Spice Up Your Life" (Murk Havana FM Radio Mix)		3:39
9.	"Spice Up Your Life" (Murk Spider Beats)		3:43
10.	"Spice Up Your Life" (Murk Sugar Cane Dub)		8:40
11.	"Spice Up Your Life" (Stent radio instrumental)		3:01
12.	"Spice Up Your Life" (karaoke version)		2:55

CD7 "Too Much"
No.	Title	Writer(s)	Length
1.	"Too Much" (radio edit)	Spice Girls; Watkins; Wilson	3:54
2.	"Outer Space Girls"	Spice Girls; Rowe; Stannard	3:59
3.	"Walk of Life"	Spice Girls; Watkins; Wilson	4:14
4.	"Too Much" (album version)		4:31
5.	"Too Much" (orchestral version)		4:40
6.	"Too Much" (SoulShock & Karlin Remix)		3:54
7.	"Too Much" (instrumental)		4:39
8.	"Too Much" (karaoke version)		3:54

CD8 "Stop"
No.	Title	Writer(s)	Length
1.	"Stop"	Spice Girls; Andrew Watkins; Paul Wilson	3:27
2.	"Ain't No Stoppin' Us Now" (featuring Luther Vandross)	Jerry Cohen; Gene McFadden; John Whitehead	4:57
3.	"Something Kinda Funny" (live in Istanbul)	Spice Girls; Watkins; Wilson	4:43
4.	"Mama" (live in Istanbul)	Rowe; Stannard; Spice Girls	5:18
5.	"Love Thing" (live in Istanbul)	Spice Girls; Kennedy; Cary Bayliss	5:07
6.	"Stop" (Morales Remix)		7:25
7.	"Stop" (Morales Dub)		8:16
8.	"Stop" (Morales Remix radio edit)		4:01
9.	"Stop" (Stretch 'N' Vern's Rock & Roll Mix)		9:12
10.	"Stop" (Stretch 'N' Vern's Biffon Dub)		11:23
11.	"Stop" (Backing Track Extra Brass)		3:26
12.	"Stop" (instrumental)		3:26
13.	"Stop" (karaoke version)		3:25

CD9 "Viva Forever"
No.	Title	Writer(s)	Length
1.	"Viva Forever" (radio edit)	Spice Girls; Rowe; Stannard	4:14
2.	"Viva Forever" (Tony Rich Remix)		5:21
3.	"Viva Forever" (album version)		5:10
4.	"Who Do You Think You Are" (live in Birmingham)		4:22
5.	"Say You'll Be There" (live in Birmingham)		4:27
6.	"Viva Forever" (John Themis Ambient Mix)		5:43
7.	"Viva Forever" (Tony Rich Main Remix)		5:44
8.	"Viva Forever" (Tony Rich Remix radio edit)		4:08
9.	"Viva Forever" (Tony Rich Remix instrumental)		5:43
10.	"Viva Forever" (instrumental)		5:10
11.	"Viva Forever" (karaoke version)		4:13

CD10 "Goodbye"
No.	Title	Writer(s)	Length
1.	"Goodbye" (radio edit)	Spice Girls; Stannard; Rowe	4:23
2.	"Christmas Wrapping"	Chris Butler	4:16
3.	"Goodbye" (single edit)		4:46
4.	"Sisters (Are Doing It for Themselves)" (live)	Annie Lennox; David A. Stewart	4:23
5.	"We Are Family" (live)	Bernard Edwards; Nile Rodgers	3:34
6.	"Goodbye" (album version)		4:35
7.	"Goodbye" (Orchestral Mix)		4:14
8.	"Goodbye" (Orchestral Master)		5:28
9.	"Goodbye" (karaoke version)		4:23

CD11 "Holler" / "Let Love Lead the Way"
No.	Title	Writer(s)	Length
1.	"Holler" (radio edit)	Victoria Beckham; Melanie Brown; Emma Bunton; Melanie Chisholm; Rodney Jerkins; LaShawn Daniels; Fred Jerkins III	3:57
2.	"Let Love Lead the Way" (radio edit)	Beckham; Brown; Bunton; Chisholm; Jerkins; Daniels; Jerkins III; Harvey Mason Jr.	4:15
3.	"Holler" (album version)		4:15
4.	"Holler" (TV edit)		3:38
5.	"Holler" (MAW Remix)		8:30
6.	"Holler" (MAW Tribal Vocal)		7:18
7.	"Holler" (MAW Spice Beats)		3:15
8.	"Holler" (MAW Dub)		6:44
9.	"Holler" (MAW Remix instrumental)		7:17
10.	"Holler" (MAW Tribal instrumental)		7:18
11.	"Holler" (karaoke version)		3:54
12.	"Let Love Lead the Way" (album version)		4:58
13.	"Let Love Lead the Way" (TV edit)		3:43
14.	"Let Love Lead the Way" (karaoke version)		4:16

CD12 "Tell Me Why"
No.	Title	Writer(s)	Length
1.	"Tell Me Why" (radio edit)	Beckham; Brown; Bunton; Jerkins; Daniels; Jerkins III; Mischke Butler	3:45
2.	"If You Wanna Have Some Fun" (radio edit)	Beckham; Brown; Bunton; Chisholm; James Harris III; Terry Lewis	4:00
3.	"Tell Me Why" (Jonathan Peters Edit)		3:24
4.	"Tell Me Why" (Jonathan Peters Club Mix)		9:20
5.	"Tell Me Why" (Thunderpuss Edit)		3:41
6.	"Tell Me Why" (ThunderDUB)		8:49
7.	"Tell Me Why" (Thunderpuss Club Mix)		10:57
8.	"Tell Me Why" (Tribe-A-Pella)		8:05
9.	"Tell Me Why" (Mixshow)		7:35
10.	"Tell Me Why" (Thunderpuss Radio instrumental)		3:40
11.	"Tell Me Why" (12" instrumental)		10:57

CD13 "Headlines (Friendship Never Ends)"
No.	Title	Writer(s)	Length
1.	"Headlines (Friendship Never Ends)"	Spice Girls; Stannard; Rowe	3:30
2.	"Wannabe" (Soul Seekerz Radio Edit)		3:32
3.	"Wannabe" (Soul Seekerz 2007 Remix)		6:56
4.	"Wannabe" (Soul Seekerz Dub)		6:56
5.	"2 Become 1" (Georgie Porgie's Radio Edit)		4:03
6.	"2 Become 1" (Georgie Porgie's Extended Mix)		7:16
7.	"2 Become 1" (Georgie Porgie's Dub Mix)		7:18
8.	"Spice Up Your Life" (Ralphi's Radio Edit)		3:39
9.	"Spice Up Your Life" (Ralphi's Vocal Mix)		9:06
10.	"Spice Up Your Life" (Ralphi's Dub Mix)		8:36
11.	"Spice Girls Megamix" (radio edit)		4:24
12.	"Spice Girls Club Megamix"		7:06

CD14 The Demos
No.	Title	Writer(s)	Length
1.	"Do You Think About Me" (demo)	Alan Glass; Georgie Trevorson; Roger Russell	4:07
2.	"Wannabe" (demo)		2:56
3.	"2 Become 1" (demo)		4:02
4.	"Mama" (demo)		4:52
5.	"Who Do You Think You Are" (demo)		3:48
6.	"Step To Me" (demo)		4:50
7.	"Love Thing" (demo)		3:42
8.	"Last Time Lover" (demo)		4:06
9.	"If U Can't Dance" (demo)		3:36
10.	"Feed Your Love" (demo)	Rowe; Stannard; Spice Girls	5:14

7-inch vinyl 1 "Wannabe"
No.	Title	Writer(s)	Length
1.	"Wannabe"	Spice Girls; Matt Rowe; Richard Stannard	2:54
2.	"Bumper to Bumper"	Paul Wilson; Andy Watkins; Cathy Dennis	3:42

7-inch vinyl 2 "Say You'll Be There"
No.	Title	Writer(s)	Length
1.	"Say You'll Be There" (single mix)	Spice Girls; Eliot Kennedy; Jon B.	3:58
2.	"Take Me Home"	Spice Girls; Wilson; Watkins	4:09
Total length:			8:07

7-inch vinyl 3 "2 Become 1"
No.	Title	Writer(s)	Length
1.	"2 Become 1" (single version)	Spice Girls; Rowe; Stannard	4:05
2.	"One of These Girls"	Wilson; Watkins	3:33
Total length:			7:38

7-inch vinyl 4 "Mama" / "Who Do You Think You Are"
No.	Title	Writer(s)	Length
1.	"Mama" (radio version)	Rowe; Stannard; Spice Girls	3:42
2.	"Who Do You Think You Are" (radio version)	Spice Girls; Watkins; Wilson	3:46

7-inch vinyl 5 "Step to Me"
No.	Title	Writer(s)	Length
1.	"Step to Me" (7" mix)	Spice Girls; Eliot Kennedy	4:05
2.	"Move Over"	Clifford Lane; Mary Wood; Spice Girls	2:44

7-inch vinyl 6 "Spice Up Your Life"
No.	Title	Writer(s)	Length
1.	"Spice Up Your Life" (Stent Radio Mix)	Spice Girls; Rowe; Stannard	2:56
2.	"Spice Invaders"	Wilson; Watkins	3:39

7-inch vinyl 7 "Too Much"
No.	Title	Writer(s)	Length
1.	"Too Much" (radio edit)	Spice Girls; Watkins; Wilson	3:54
2.	"Outer Space Girls"	Spice Girls; Rowe; Stannard	3:59

7-inch vinyl 8 "Stop"
No.	Title	Writer(s)	Length
1.	"Stop"	Spice Girls; Andrew Watkins; Paul Wilson	3:27
2.	"Ain't No Stoppin' Us Now" (featuring Luther Vandross)	Jerry Cohen; Gene McFadden; John Whitehead	4:57

7-inch vinyl 9 "Viva Forever"
No.	Title	Writer(s)	Length
1.	"Viva Forever" (radio edit)	Spice Girls; Rowe; Stannard	4:14
2.	"Viva Forever" (Tony Rich Remix)		5:21

7-inch vinyl 10 "Goodbye"
No.	Title	Writer(s)	Length
1.	"Goodbye" (radio edit)	Spice Girls; Stannard; Rowe	4:23
2.	"Christmas Wrapping"	Chris Butler	4:16

7-inch vinyl 11 "Holler" / "Let Love Lead the Way"
No.	Title	Writer(s)	Length
1.	"Holler" (radio edit)	Victoria Beckham; Melanie Brown; Emma Bunton; Melanie Chisholm; Rodney Jerkins; LaShawn Daniels; Fred Jerkins III	3:57
2.	"Let Love Lead the Way" (radio edit)	Beckham; Brown; Bunton; Chisholm; Jerkins; Daniels; Jerkins III; Harvey Mason Jr.	4:15

7-inch vinyl 12 "Tell Me Why"
No.	Title	Writer(s)	Length
1.	"Tell Me Why" (radio edit)	Beckham; Brown; Bunton; Jerkins; Daniels; Jerkins III; Mischke Butler	3:45
2.	"If You Wanna Have Some Fun" (radio edit)	Beckham; Brown; Bunton; Chisholm; James Harris III; Terry Lewis	4:00

7-inch vinyl 13 "Headlines (Friendship Never Ends)"
No.	Title	Writer(s)	Length
1.	"Headlines (Friendship Never Ends)"	Spice Girls; Stannard; Rowe	3:30
2.	"Wannabe" (Soul Seekerz radio edit)		3:32

7-inch vinyl 14 The Demos
No.	Title	Writer(s)	Length
1.	"Do You Think About Me" (demo)	Alan Glass; Georgie Trevorson; Roger Russell	4:07
2.	"2 Become 1" (demo)		4:02

== Charts ==
Weekly chart performance for The Singles Collection
Chart (2026)	Peak position
Scottish Albums (Official Charts)	41
Spanish Albums (Promusicae)	57
UK Albums (Official Charts)	74

== Release history ==
Release dates and formats for The Singles Collection
Region	Date	Format	Label	Ref.
Global	6 November 2026	CD; 7-inch vinyl; music download; streaming	UM^{e}; Virgin	
