= To All the Boys: Always and Forever (soundtrack) =

To All the Boys: Always and Forever (Music from the Netflix Film)

Soundtrack album by various artists
- Released: February 12, 2021
- Genre: Soundtrack
- Length: 53:58
- Label: Capitol
- Producers: Laura Webb; Lindsay Wolfington

Singles from To All the Boys: Always and Forever (Music from the Netflix Film)
- 1. "Beginning Middle End" Released: February 10, 2021

To All the Boys: Always and Forever (Music from the Netflix Film) is the soundtrack to the 2021 film To All the Boys: Always and Forever. It was released on February 12, 2021 by Capitol Records. The film, in its entirety featured over 45 songs: both original, incorporated, existing but previously unreleased tracks. Out of which, 16 tracks were compiled into the soundtrack album, with four original tracks produced for the film. The track "Beginning Middle End", was released as a single on February 10, prior to the soundtrack release.

== Development ==
For the third instalment, music supervisors and compilers, Laura Webb and Lindsay Wolfington had planned for about 47 songs, as they wanted to keep the tracks, true to Lara Jean's (Lana Condor) character and spirit. According to them, "The lush and dreamy musical landscape of the series also has an unintentional ‘80s influence, which ties in with the trilogy's John Hughes references and LJ's favorite films." For the soundtrack, they chose more K-pop tracks, since most of the story is set in South Korea. Songs from several artists, including bands such as The Greeting Committee, Spice Girls and Blossoms, and indie musicians such as Anna of the North, Leah Nobel, Jordan Suaste, Emmit Fenn among others were chosen to be compiled into the soundtrack.

== Track listing ==
To All the Boys: Always and Forever (Music from the Netflix Film)
No.	Title	Writer(s)	Performer(s)	Length
1.	"Beginning Middle End" (Version 1)	Leah Nobel; Quinn Redmond	Leah	3:14
2.	"Run For Your Money"	Addison Sartino; Austin Fraser; Brandon Yangmi; Jack Kennedy Herkel; Pierce Turcotte	The Greeting Committee	3:02
3.	"Dream Girl"	Anna Lotterud; Barnie Lister; Josh Record	Anna of the North	2:31
4.	"Wannabe"	Richard Stannard; Emma Bunton; Geri Halliwell; Matt Rowe; Mel B; Melanie C; Victoria Beckham	Spice Girls	2:53
5.	"On Fire Again"	Cameron Hale Lazar; Cari Fletcher	Fletcher	3:03
6.	"Eat Them Apples"	David Bayley; Suzanna McDermott	Suzi Wu	2:55
7.	"Beginning Middle End" (Version 2)	Addison; Austin; Brandon; Jack; Pierce	The Greeting Committee	3:15
8.	"Won't Let Go"	Hannah Kenny; Ian Kizanis; Keith Varon	Black Match	4:03
9.	"If The World Ended Tonight"	Jacob Ostler; Jordan Suaste	Jordan Suaste	3:56
10.	"Until We Leave the Ground"	Emmit Fenn; Neil Ormandy	Emmit Fenn	2:57
11.	"17"	Addison; Austin; Brandon; Jack; Pierce	The Greeting Committee	3:39
12.	"Oh No (I Think I'm in Love)"	Charlie Salt; Joe Donovan; Josh Dewhurst; Myles Kellock; Tom Ogden	Blossoms	3:42
13.	"In My Head"	Peter Manos	Peter	3:34
14.	"Unsung Songs"	Tim Perry	Ages and Ages	3:58
15.	"The Same"	Noah Conrad; Ashlyn Wilson	Ashe	3:53
16.	"Beginning Middle End" (Always and Forever Mix)	Leah; Quinn	Leah	3:16
Total length:				53:58

== Additional music ==
Songs that are featured in the film, but not in the soundtrack, include:

- "Gee" – Girls' Generation
- "Fancy" – Lana Condor, Janel Parrish and Anna Cathcart
- "Q&A" – Cherry Bullet
- "I Love You" – Laureline
- "Affection" – Lady Bri
- "Wannabe" – Sandflower
- "Me and My Mind" – Jazz Morley
- "All Right Now" – David Das
- "You're All I Need to Make It" – Johnson, Hawkins, Tatum, & Durr
- "Tutti Frutti" – Little Richard
- "Pretty Savage" – Blackpink
- "I Like Me Better (Ryan Riback Remix)" – Lauv
- "Heartshaker" – Tom Speight
- "Warm Glow" – Hippo Campus
- "Never Change" – ITS Studios
- "Do Not Disturb" – Dan Cipriano
- "Gold Star" – The Greeting Committee
- "Bambola" – Betta Lemme
- "Don't Speak" – Lune
- "Highway" – Suzi Wu
- "One More Chance" – Charlie Faye & The Fayettes
- "Don't Look Back in Anger" – Oasis
- "Peaches" – Milk & Bone, Alex Lustig
- "Feeling That" – Sioux Sioux
- "These Days" – IOLITE
- "Second Fiddle" – Ann Haggin
- "Real Love" – Ashe
- "I Will Take Care of You" – William Bell
- "Dancing in the Moonlight" – Toploader
- "Feeling Good" – John the Martyr

== Release history ==
Release dates and formats for To All the Boys: Always and Forever (Music from the Netflix Film)
Region	Date	Format(s)	Label	Ref.
Various	February 12, 2021	Digital download; streaming	Capitol	
United States	May 7, 2021	CD	Capitol	
United States	June 18, 2021	LP	Capitol	

== Reception ==
As similar to the soundtracks of the previous films, Always and Forever received positive critical response. Tamara Fuentess of Seventeen, called the soundtrack as "the best from the previous instalments". Olivia Truffaut Wong of Refinery29 called "the TATB: Always And Forever soundtrack is full of pretty good options. It features a mix of upbeat pop and more mellow indie faire, spanning from K-Pop to Oasis. But the real highlight comes from the inclusion of a few original songs written specifically for the film." Popbuzz called it as "an absolutely banging soundtrack". Abby Monteil of Elite Daily wrote "The songs on the To All The Boys 3 soundtrack is full of catchy tunes that'll leave you ready to fall for the series all over again [...] In many ways, it's the most mature and emotional installment of the franchise to date, which the soundtrack reflects. It also highlights plenty of exciting, upbeat moments."
