= Wembley live shows =

There are several Wikipedia articles which relate to Wembley live shows at the Wembley Arena or Wembley Stadium in Wembley, London

- Wembley live shows (Gladiators)
- Spice Girls Live at Wembley Stadium
- Girls Aloud: Greatest Hits Live From Wembley Arena
- Genesis Live at Wembley Stadium
- Foo Fighters Live at Wembley Stadium
- Wings Over Wembley
