= One Hour of Girl Power =

Video by Spice Girls
- Released: 14 April 1997
- Recorded: 1995–1997
- Genre: Pop
- Length: 60 minutes
- Label: Virgin

Spice Girls chronology
One Hour of Girl Power (1997)	Girl Power! Live in Istanbul (1997)

One Hour of Girl Power (also known as Spice—the Official Video—Vol. 1) is a VHS production by the Spice Girls released in the spring of 1997. It shows various performances and all the music videos filmed until that point, as well as behind the scenes of the videos. On iTunes, a five-minute abridged version of the video was released as a bonus track with the Greatest Hits album.

== Summary ==
One Hour of Girl Power shows private footage of the pre-fame Spice Girls arriving at a hotel in the United States in 1995, where they are seen running through the corridors in their robes and playing around by the pool (briefly singing the then yet to be released 'Love Thing' a cappella). Included on the video are the promotional video clips for their debut single, "Wannabe", as well as those for the following singles, "Say You'll Be There", "2 Become 1", "Mama" and "Who Do You Think You Are". The videos are interspersed with behind the scenes footage of the making of the videos, and a running commentary by the band. The video for "Who Do You Think You Are" appears in an alternate version, interspersed with behind the scenes footage featuring the 'Sugar Lumps', a Spice Girls spoof group made up of British celebrities Dawn French, Jennifer Saunders, Kathy Burke, Lulu and actress Llewella Gideon. The complete Sugar Lumps version was made to promote Comic Relief (Who Do You Think You Are was the Comic Relief single for 1997). Footage of the girls on promotional tours in America, Hong Kong and the UK make up the rest of the documentary portion of the video. The presentation concludes with an edited version of the Spice Girls' classic performance at the 1997 BRIT Awards, presented by Ben Elton.

== Sales ==
The video was very successful at the time of its release, selling almost 500,000 copies in the UK between April and June to become the best-selling pop video in the UK ever. The video peaked at number one on the UK Video Charts, and was the fifth best-selling video of 1997. It was also successful in many other countries such as Japan and the US. In the US, the video was the 20th best-selling video of 1998.

== Track listing ==
No.	Title	Writer(s)	Director(s)	Length
1.	"Interviews and Footage with The Girls' Commentary"
2.	"Wannabe" (music video)	Spice Girls; Matt Rowe; Richard Stannard	Johan Camitz	3:55
3.	"Say You'll Be There" (music video)	Spice Girls; Eliot Kennedy; Jon B.	Vaughan Arnell	3:52
4.	"2 Become 1" (music video)	Spice Girls; Matt Rowe; Richard Stannard	Big TV!	3:52
5.	"Mama" (music video)	Spice Girls; Matt Rowe; Richard Stannard	Big TV!	3:33
6.	"Who Do You Think You Are" (exclusive version^{[a]})	Spice Girls; Andy Watkins; Paul Wilson		3:40
Total length:				60:00

Notes

- ^{^[a]} 1997 Brit Awards performance.

== Certifications ==
Region	Certification	Certified units/sales
Canada (Music Canada)	8× Platinum	80,000^{^}
France (SNEP)	3× Platinum	60,000^{*}
United Kingdom (BPI)	13× Platinum	650,000^{*}
^{*} Sales figures based on certification alone.^{^} Shipments figures based on certification alone.
