= Spice World (video game) =

1998 video game

- Developer: Team SOHO
- Publishers: EU: Sony Computer Entertainment; NA: Psygnosis
- Producers: Martin Alltimes; Richard Milner; Mick Sawyer
- Programmers: Derek Whiteman; Phong Ly; Chris Emsen; Jason Page; Michael Braithwaite
- Artists: Jason Millson; Antonia Blackler; Colin Wren
- Composer: Jason Page
- Platform: PlayStation
- Release: EU: 19 June 1998; NA: 4 August 1998
- Genre: Music
- Mode: Single-player

Spice World is a 1998 music video game developed and published by Sony Computer Entertainment for the PlayStation. It was released by Sony subsidiary Psygnosis in North America.

== Content ==
With tracks like "Wannabe", "Who Do You Think You Are", "Move Over", "Spice Up Your Life" and "Say You'll Be There", each animated Spice Girl will offer a few comments as the player tours the game's stages, experiencing a DJ and dance instructor that speak in stereotypical fashions. There are eleven dance moves applicable, each one a different combination of four buttons: six "basic" ones (the sway, shoulder shimmy, point and sway, knee wiggle, twirl, and shuffle) and five "special" moves (freestyle point, freestyle wave, hip wiggle, and side-jump). There is one button combination which triggers a backflip for Mel C and a walk and wave for the other Spice Girls. The game also contains a dozen interviews along with other entertaining moments, such as Geri Halliwell groping the buttocks of the then-Prince Charles, and the girls wreaking havoc on a Japanese talk-show.

In the game, players go through different stages to prepare the animated Spice Girls for a live television performance. The game starts out in the Mixing Room, where the player chooses the song the group will perform and the order each of its nine sections will be played. From the Mixing Room, the game then moves into Dance Practice, where the player gets to choreograph the dance routines for the group's performance by hitting button combinations as they appear on the screen.

The player then records the routines by programming each animated Spice Girl's dance steps one by one; routines recorded in one member of the group can also be copied to another member. When it is time for the show at the TV Studio, the player acts as the camera-person, choosing from eight different camera shots that can be moved in four directions; the player gets to watch the animated group sing and dance as the player has directed them to, with the camera shots selected by the player. This is followed by a 20-minute video footage of the actual Spice Girls being interviewed in the South of France. Throughout the game, the player is instructed by a disco king on what to do.

Up to 15 mixes, dance routines, and TV studio recordings can be saved on a single memory card.

== Songs ==
- "Wannabe"
- "Say You'll Be There"
- "Who Do You Think You Are"
- "Spice Up Your Life"
- "Move Over"
- "If U Can't Dance" (featured in the intro and the Spice Network)
- "2 Become 1" (only in the Spice Network)
- "Naked" (only in the Spice Network)

== Development ==
After seeing PaRappa the Rapper (1997) attract new types of users to the PlayStation market in Japan, Sony Computer Entertainment Europe thought they could do the same with the European market by creating and releasing a music video game; this inspired them to convince 19 Entertainment to produce a game featuring the girl group Spice Girls, a brand with enough leverage to be endorsed by Walker's Crisps, Pepsi and Asda. As the video game's demographic was Spice Girls fans, who usually didn't play video games, Sony's plan from the start of development was to make it an "interactive magazine" where the player could be part of the girl group's lifestyle.

Production of Spice World began in June 1997. Spice World was developed by Sony Computer Entertainment Europe's internal team at Soho, using the same lighting engine as their previous game Porsche Challenge (1997). The developers originally planned for a realistic art style where the Spice Girls were animated with motion capture; however, lead artist Jason Millson changed the plan to a more caricatured style where the characters were animated manually, reasoning that it enhanced their personalities. From Millson's view, Spice World was the Spice Girls' version of the Beatles vanity project Yellow Submarine (1968). Peter Eley, manager of the project, admitted that some staff didn't take the project seriously: "At first a lot of them weren't that keen. Some of them viewed it as a bit of a ludicrous prospect."

The game was exhibited at the September 1997 European Computer Trade Show. Shortly before the game's release date in June 1998, Geri Halliwell left the Spice Girls which led to concerns by Sony that Spice World would have to be pulled or revised. The company was later given permission by Halliwell's lawyer to proceed with the game, two weeks before its scheduled release.

== Reception ==
Reception

Aggregate score
Aggregator	Score
GameRankings	40%

Review scores
Publication	Score
Computer and Video Games	1/5
Electronic Gaming Monthly	3.38/10 (Note: Four critics from Electronic Gaming Monthly rated Spice World differently: 6/10, 1.5/10, 2/10, and 4/10.)
Game Informer	3/10
GamePro	3.5/5 (Note: GamePro gave Spice World two 3/5 scores for control and fun factor, a 3.5/5 for graphics and a 4.5/5 for sound.)
GamesMaster	43/100
GameSpot	2.3/10
IGN	2/10
PlayStation Official Magazine – Australia	3/5
PlayStation Official Magazine – UK	4/10
PlayStation: The Official Magazine	2/5
Entertainment Weekly	B−
Los Angeles Times	1/4
PlayStation Plus	21%

Award
Publication	Award
Hyper	Worst Game of 1997–1998

The video game was sold out in the United Kingdom within several months of its release. Unlike most Sony PlayStation games at the time which "were almost exclusively bought by men," Spice World was mostly purchased by "mothers and daughters". The game sold 75,000 copies.

Although a top-ten seller in the United Kingdom and garnering some reviews suggesting it would appeal to young fans of the Spice Girls, Spice World was generally critically panned as an inferior PaRappa the Rapper game. Reviews panned its lack of substance and content, labeling it a non-gaming experience of only pressing buttons for a few minutes. GameSpot stated that its limited amount of samples in the mixing feature, including "few bridges" and "sung lines cut off halfway through," lead to "choppy, amateurish" tracks. J.C. Herz of The New York Times criticized Spice World for the same reason he disliked similar interactive music video games starring celebrity artists, for the mixture of "recycled content with the illusion of choice, the fake empowerment of mixing your own version of someone else's music with a keyboard or a joystick".

Critics also commented how it failed to capture the charm of the Spice Girls brand. Herz noted there wasn't even a feature to alter the Spice Girls' attire, while GameSpot claimed they were "transformed into personality-less cartoons, featuring only a few trademark idiosyncrasies." It also commented on the quality of the video segments: "the shocking levels of video compression and the poorly-synched voice dubbing renders the footage barely watchable."

GamePro criticized the horrifying look of the 3D Spice Girls, "clunky, confusing controls," and dances that "are neither clear nor exciting."

== See also ==
- Spice Girls merchandise and sponsorship deals
