= Suzi Wu =

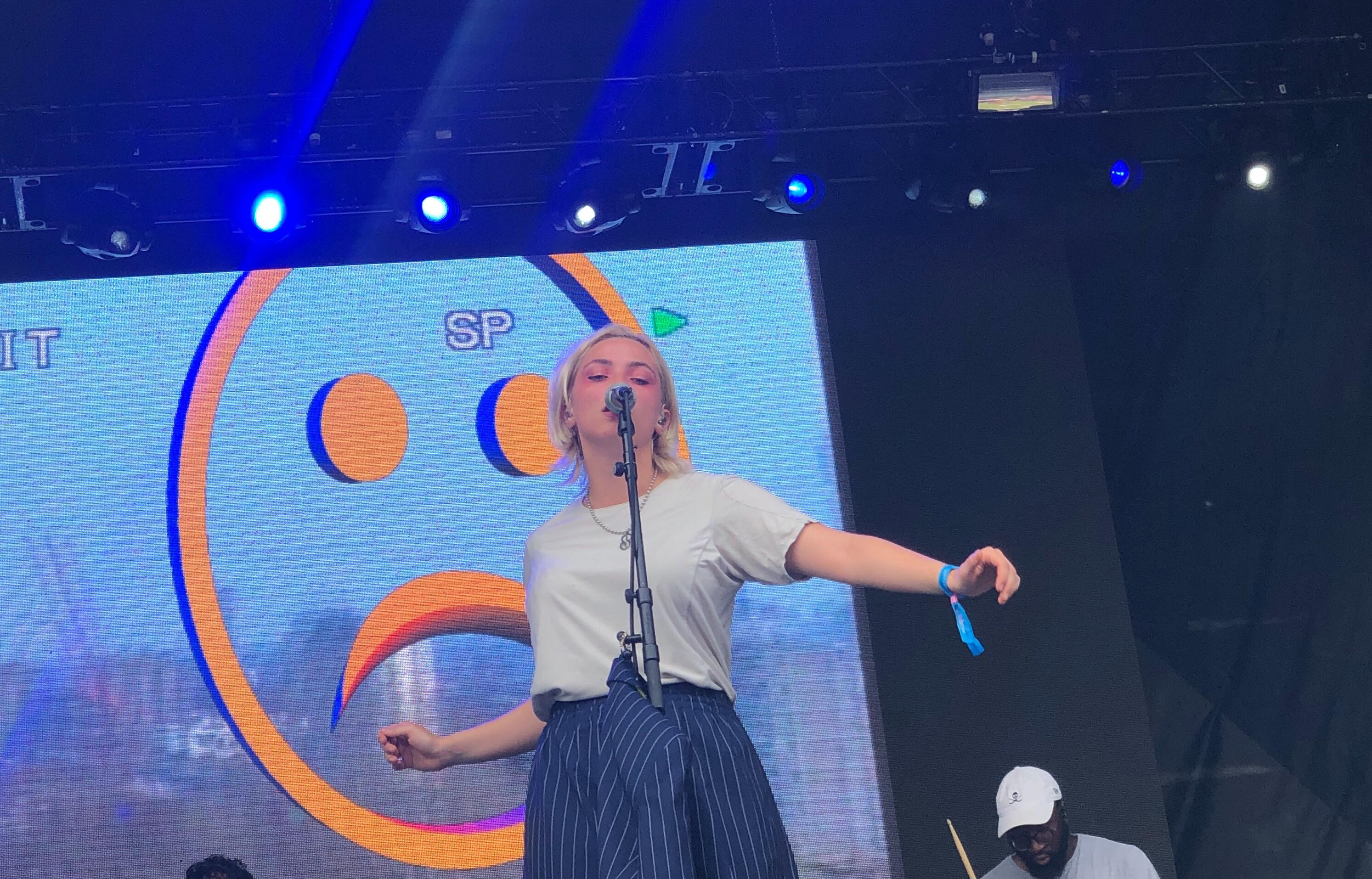
- Suzi Wu at the 2019 Governors Ball Music Festival

Background information
- Born: Suzie McDermott; 1998 (age 27–28)
- Origin: Blackpool, England
- Genres: British hip hop; electropop
- Occupation: Musician
- Years active: 2017–present
- Label: Def Jam Recordings
- Website: www.suzi-wu.com

Suzie McDermott, (born 1998) better known by her stage name Suzi Wu, is an English musician from London.

== Career ==
Wu released her debut EP in 2017 titled Teenage Witch.

=== 2019–present: Error 404 ===
In 2019, Wu signed to Def Jam Recordings and released her second EP titled Error 404.

Wu was featured on Billboard's list titled "The 10 Artists You Need to Know About for the 2019 Festival Season". Wu was also featured in the soundtrack for FIFA 20, with her song "Highway".

In October 2020, her song "Eat Them Apples" was featured in the TV ad for Apple's iPhone 12. The song was also featured on the soundtrack of NHL 21, which released in the same month.
