= Tell Me Why (Spice Girls song) =

2000 song by the Spice Girls

Promotional single by Spice Girls

from the album Forever
- Released: December 2000
- Recorded: 2000
- Genre: Pop; R&B
- Length: 4:13 (album version); 3:42 (radio edit)
- Label: Virgin
- Songwriters: Victoria Beckham; Melanie Brown; Emma Bunton; Rodney Jerkins; LaShawn Daniels; Fred Jerkins III; Mischke Butler
- Producers: Rodney Jerkins; LaShawn Daniels

Audio video
- "Tell Me Why" on YouTube

"Tell Me Why" is a song by British girl group, the Spice Girls, appearing as the second track on their third studio album Forever (2000). The song was written by Victoria Beckham, Melanie Brown, Emma Bunton, Rodney Jerkins, LaShawn Daniels, Fred Jerkins III and Mischke Butler. Jerkins and Daniels produced the song. It was released as a promotional single in December 2000. Originally planned as the second single from Forever, the release was scrapped.

== Background ==
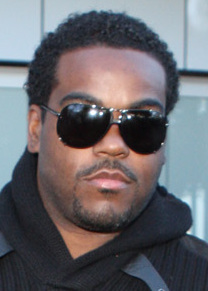
Rodney Jerkins writer and producer of "Tell Me Why" (pictured in 2013).

After the Spice Girls released "Goodbye" as their first single without member Geri Halliwell in December 1998, the group took a break. In mid-1999, they began working on their third studio album and for the first time worked with producer Rodney Jerkins. Jerkins said that he hoped to bring an "urban, danceable" feel to the project: "It will still have a pop appeal, but the beats will be a little harder".

== Release ==
"Tell Me Why" was released in December 2000 as one of the three songs released as promotional singles from the Spice Girls' third studio album Forever, along with "If You Wanna Have Some Fun" and "Weekend Love". In January 2001, Virgin Records issued a promotional disc featuring remixes of the song by Thunderpuss and Jonathan Peters. The single and its remixes were not commercially released due to the "disappointing" sales of the parent album. In the summer of 2001, a promotional single featuring the remixes was released in Australia as a competition prize in a cross-promotion with TV Hits Magazine.

Jonathan Peters' edit of "Tell Me Why" would later be commercially released in November 2007, as a bonus track and the seventeenth song on the deluxe edition of the group's Greatest Hits album.

The song was performed in the 2012–13 jukebox musical Viva Forever!, which was based on the songs of the Spice Girls.

In November 2026, the box set The Singles Collection was released–receiving its own CD and LP.

== Composition ==
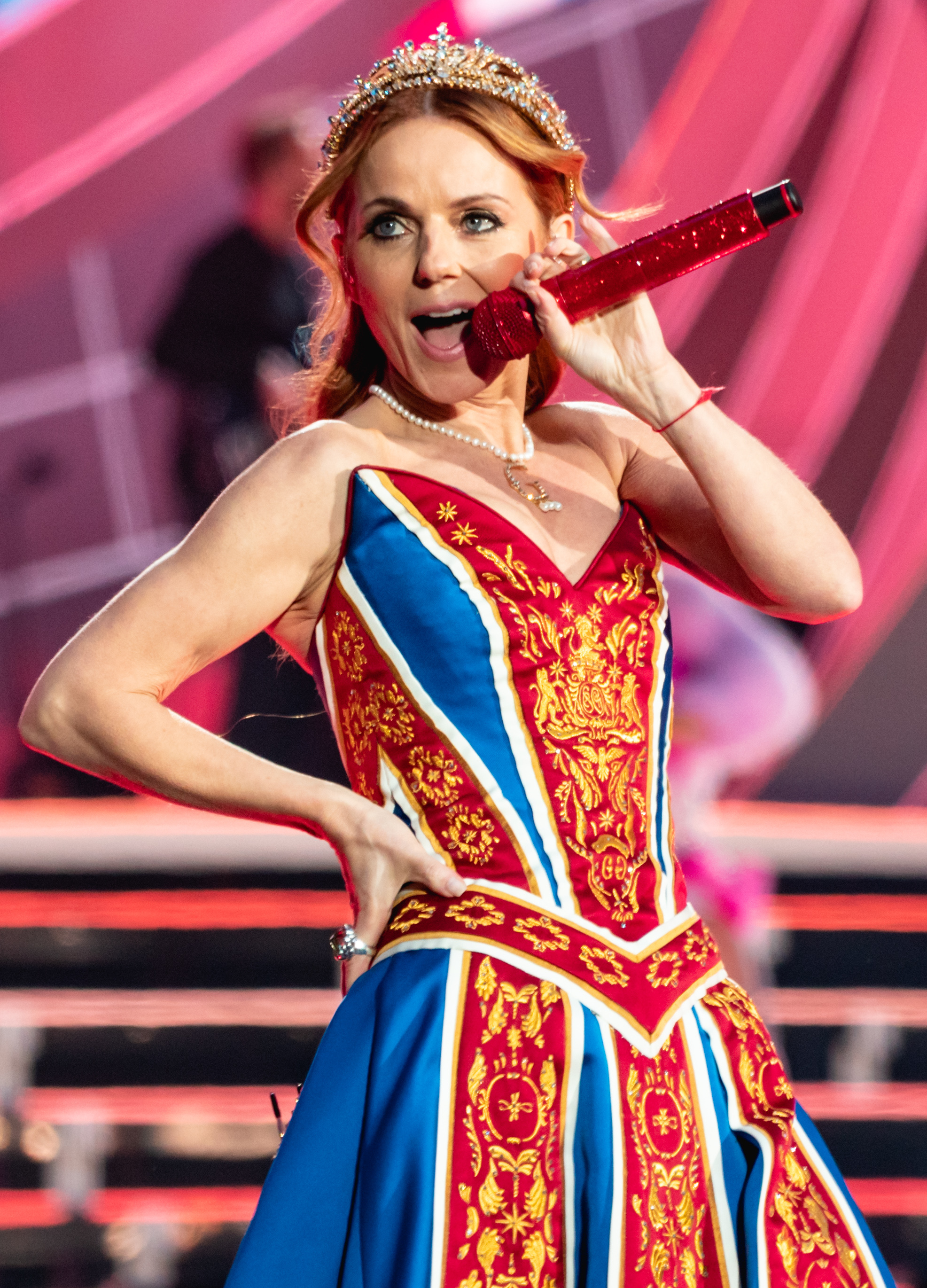
The song's lyrics were directed toward Geri Halliwell (pictured in 2019).

"Tell Me Why" was written by the members of the group Victoria Beckham, Melanie Brown and Emma Bunton, along with Rodney Jerkins, LaShawn Daniels, Fred Jerkins III and Mischke Butler. The production was handled by Jerkins and Daniels. The song is one of the three Spice Girls album tracks that Melanie C didn't receive a writing credit. It is described as a "sparse, uptempo slice of R&B, flecked with chattering electronics" by Alexis Petridis by The Guardian. In March 2019, Bunton stated that the song was about fellow Spice Girls member – Geri Halliwell, adding "we were writing songs, we were being very honest and open."

== Critical reception ==
James Hunter of Rolling Stone called the song as a "silky, spiky danceability" track. Anne T. Donahue of Vulture criticized the song and described it as attempt of the Spice Girls at throwing "shade" at Geri Halliwell, a former group member at the time. J.D. Considine of The Baltimore Sun described the track as an "itchy, keyboard-driven pulse." Dorian S. Ham of The Lantern called the song as a "right tune with its jerky guitar driven beat", and describing it as a "fairly entertaining imitation" of an upbeat Mariah Carey song.

Jamie Tabberer of Rolling Stone UK labeled the Thunderpuss Radio Instrumental of the song, as a highlight from the group's 2026 box set–The Singles Collection, and compared it to a Thunderpuss remix of Whitney Houston's song "It's Not Right but It's Okay".

== Commercial performance ==
According to Official Charts, "Tell Me Why" drew 1.5 million streams in United Kingdom.

== Format and track listing ==
Promotional CD

1. "Tell Me Why" (radio edit) – 3:42
2. "Tell Me Why" (Thunderpuss edit) – 3:39
3. "Tell Me Why" (Thunderpuss Club Mix) – 10:55
4. "Tell Me Why" (Jonathan Peters edit) – 3:22
5. "Tell Me Why" (Jonathan Peters Club Mix) – 9:19

The Singles Collection–"Tell Me Why" 7-inch vinyl

1. "Tell Me Why" (radio edit) – 3:44
2. "If You Wanna Have Some Fun" (radio edit) – 4:00

The Singles Collection–"Tell Me Why" CD

1. "Tell Me Why" (radio edit) – 3:44
2. "If You Wanna Have Some Fun" (radio edit) – 4:00
3. "Tell Me Why" (Jonathan Peters edit) – 3:24
4. "Tell Me Why" (Jonathan Peters Club Mix) – 9:19
5. "Tell Me Why" (Thunderpuss edit) – 3:40
6. "Tell Me Why" (ThunderDUB) – 8:49
7. "Tell Me Why" (Thunderpuss Club Mix) – 10:57
8. Tell Me Why" (Tribe-A-Pella) – 8:05
9. Tell Me Why" (Mixshow) – 7:34
10. Tell Me Why" (Thunderpuss Radio instrumental) – 3:40
11. Tell Me Why" (12″ instrumental) – 10:56

== Credits and personnel ==
Credits adapted from the liner notes of Forever.

- Victoria Beckham – lyrics, vocals
- Melanie Brown – lyrics, vocals
- Emma Bunton – lyrics, vocals
- Melanie Chisholm – vocals
- Rodney Jerkins – lyrics, production, music, audio mixing
- LaShawn Daniels – lyrics, vocal production
- Fred Jerkins III – lyrics
- Mischke Butler – lyrics
- Paul Foley – recorder
- Ben Garrison – audio mixing

Published by EMI Full Kneel Music, EMI Blackwood Inc., Rodney Jerkins Productions Inc., EMI April Music Inc., LaShawn Productions Inc., Ensign Music Corp. and Fred Jerkins Publishing.

== Release history ==
Release dates and formats for "Tell Me Why"
Region	Date	Format	Label	Ref.
United Kingdom	December 2000	Promotional CD	Virgin	
Greece	December 2000	Promotional CD	Virgin	
Canada	December 2000	Promotional CD	Virgin	
Australia	2001	Promotional CD	Virgin	
Global	6 November 2026	CD; 7-inch vinyl	UM^{e}; Virgin	
