= The Greeting Committee =

American indie rock band

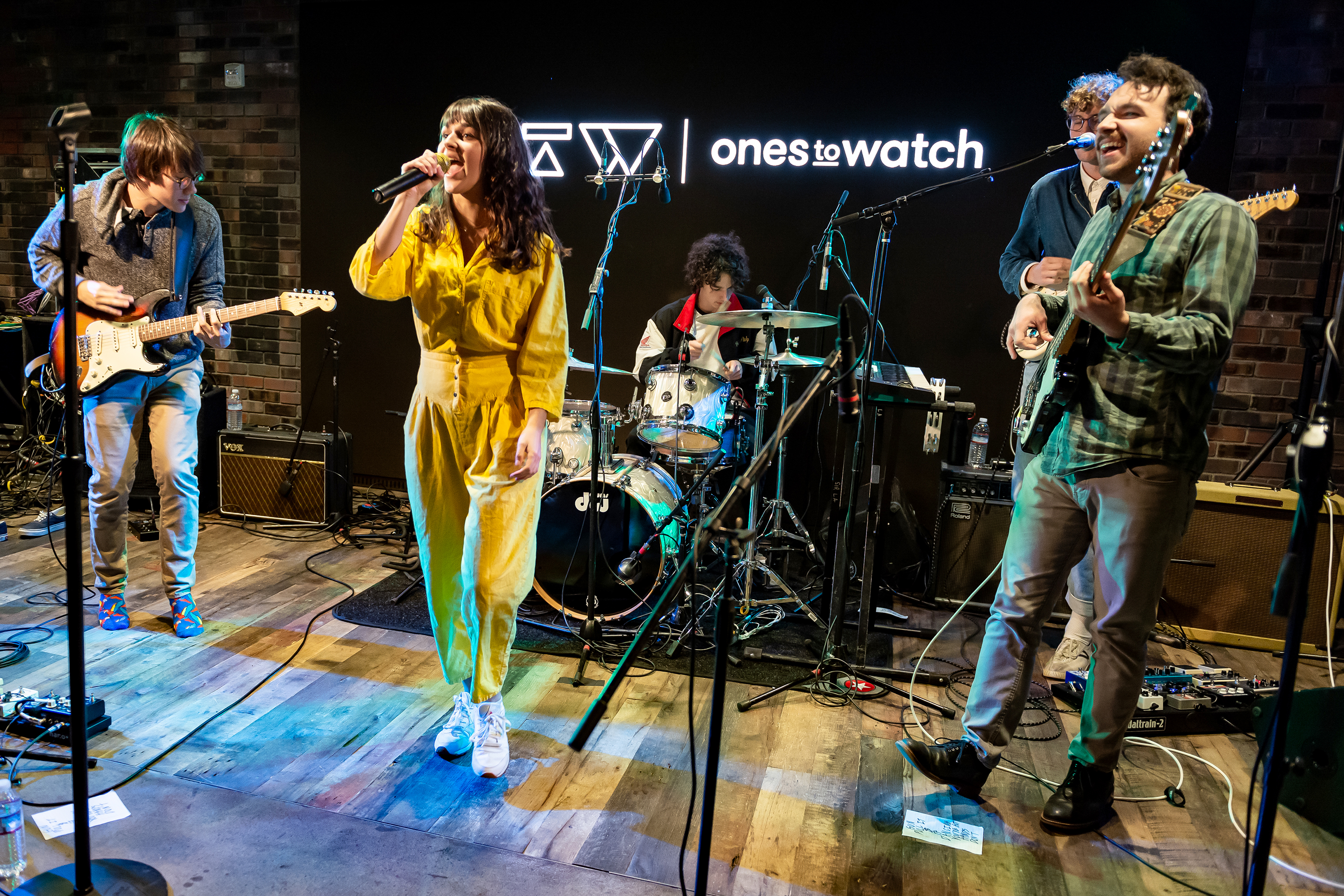

Background information
- Origin: Overland Park, Kansas
- Genres: Indie rock
- Years active: 2014-present
- Label: Harvest Records (2015 - 2022)
- Members: Addie Sartino; Pierce Turcotte; Micah Ritchie; Noah Spencer
- Past members: Austin Fraser; Brandon Yangmi
- Website: www.thegcband.com

The Greeting Committee is an American indie rock band from Overland Park, Kansas. The band initially received attention after its single, "Hands Down", received airplay on Kansas City's KRBZ radio station in 2015. Two EPs preceded the release of the group's debut studio album, This Is It, released in October 2018. The band released their second album Dandelion on September 21, 2021. The band's latest album Everyone’s Gone And I Know I'm The Cause released on June 21, 2024.

== History ==
The Greeting Committee, or T.G.C., was formed by Addie Sartino (lead vocals), Brandon Yangmi (guitar), Pierce Turcotte (bass), and Austin Fraser (drums) while the four were attending Blue Valley High School in Overland Park, Kansas in the summer of 2014. The group's first gig was at a school talent show that year. In March 2015, The Greeting Committee self-released its first EP, It's Not All That Bad. A copy of the collection was given to Lazlo Geiger, an on-air personality at Kansas City's KRBZ radio station. Geiger began playing the band's track, "Hands Down", on air. The song has gone on to accrue over 10 million streams on various platforms since then.

After the release of the EP and the radio airplay of "Hands Down", the band began performing as an opening act for a variety of concerts in Kansas City-area venues. They were also signed to Harvest Records, which re-released It's Not All That Bad in October 2015 with several re-recorded tracks and an additional song. In 2016, the band played at South by Southwest and Lollapalooza for the first time and toured with several bands including Kitten, The Mowgli's, and Judah & the Lion.

In March 2017, the band released its second EP, Meeting People Is Easy, on Harvest Records. That collection featured the singles, "Elise" and "She's a Gun". That year, the group opened for acts like Saint Motel, Andrew McMahon, and MisterWives. In the spring of 2018, The Greeting Committee toured with Jukebox the Ghost. It also released the single, "17", in April of that year. In June 2018, the band's lead singer, Addie Sartino, wrote a piece in Rookie magazine discussing growing up as part of the LGBTQ community, themes that often appear in her lyrics. Later in 2018, the group began releasing new tracks, including "Don't Go" and "You've Got Me".

Those songs would serve as the singles for the band's debut studio album, This Is It, released in October 2018 on Harvest Records. Nylon magazine listed the album as one of the "20 best music releases" of that week. In March 2019, the band released a music video for the song, "Is This It?", and opened for Arkells. They then embarked on a summer headlining tour across the United States in support of This Is It. In October 2019, the band released a 4-track EP entitled, I'm Afraid I'm Not Angry. The collection was produced by Jake Luppen of Hippo Campus.

The band released its sophomore album, Dandelion, in September 2021 on Harvest Records. It was announced in October 2021 that the band had parted ways with drummer and founding member Austin Fraser. An American headlining tour supporting Dandelion began in February 2022 and concluded in March, followed by a hometown show at Kansas City's Uptown Theater in April.

== Discography ==
=== Studio albums ===
Title	Details
This Is It	Released: October 26, 2018 (US); Label: Harvest; Formats: Digital download, CD, Vinyl
Dandelion	Released: September 24, 2021 (US); Label: Harvest; Formats: Digital download, CD, Vinyl
Everyone's Gone And I Know I'm The Cause	Released: June 21, 2024 (US); Label: Self-released; Formats: Digital download, CD, Vinyl

=== Extended plays ===
Title	Details
It's Not All That Bad	Released: March 2015 (US); Label: Self-released (re-released by Harvest on October 23, 2015); Formats: Digital download
Meeting People Is Easy	Released: March 17, 2017 (US); Label: Harvest; Formats: Digital download
I'm Afraid I'm Not Angry	Released: October 17, 2019 (US); Label: Harvest; Formats: Digital download
Animal At Best	Released: April 25, 2025 (US); Label: Self-released; Formats: Digital download

=== Singles ===
Title	Year	Album
"Hands Down"	2015	It's Not All That Bad
"Elise"	2017	Non-album single
"17"	2019	This Is It
"You've Got Me"	2019	This Is It
"Don't Go"	2019	This Is It
"Can I Leave Me Too?"	2021	Dandelion
"Float Away"	2021	Dandelion
"Ada"	2021	Dandelion
"Make Out"	2021	Dandelion
"Sort of Stranger" (feat. Briston Maroney)	2022	Dandelion (Deluxe)
"Hopscotch"	2022	Non-album singles
"Anything But You"	2022	Non-album singles
"popmoneyhits"	2024	Everyone’s Gone and I Know I’m The Cause
"Where'd All My Friends Go?" (feat. Flipturn)	2024	Everyone’s Gone and I Know I’m The Cause
"How It Goes"	2024	Everyone’s Gone and I Know I’m The Cause
"Cyclical"	2024	Everyone’s Gone and I Know I’m The Cause
"Animal At Best"	2025	Non-album singles
"Get Over It"	2025	Non-album singles
"What I Wouldn't Give"	2025	Non-album singles
