= Headlines (Friendship Never Ends) =

2007 song by the Spice Girls

Single by Spice Girls

from the album Greatest Hits
- Released: 5 November 2007
- Recorded: July 2007
- Genre: Pop
- Length: 3:31
- Label: Virgin
- Songwriters: Spice Girls; Richard Stannard; Matt Rowe
- Producers: Matt Rowe; Richard Stannard

Spice Girls singles chronology
"Holler" / "Let Love Lead the Way" (2000)	"Headlines (Friendship Never Ends)" (2007)

Music video
- "Headlines (Friendship Never Ends)" on YouTube

"Headlines (Friendship Never Ends)" is a song by English girl group the Spice Girls for their greatest hits album Greatest Hits (2007). It was written by the Spice Girls, Richard Stannard and Matt Rowe, whilst produced by the latter two. It was released as the only single from the album on 5 November 2007 by Virgin Records. The song was the first commercial single release to feature the group's original lineup since Geri Halliwell left in 1998. It was also the official Children in Need single of 2007. It is their last studio single to date.

"Headlines (Friendship Never Ends)" is a midtempo ballad, which lyrically talks about the group reuniting, and about their friendship throughout two decades together. The song received generally mixed to positive reviews from music critics, with some calling it a "classic" from the group, while others felt it was not good enough. "Headlines (Friendship Never Ends)" was a moderate success worldwide, peaking at number 11 on the UK Singles Chart, becoming the group's first single not to peak inside the top ten. Nevertheless, the single managed to reach number three on the UK Physical Singles Chart. It reached the top five in Italy, Spain and Sweden.

An accompanying music video for "Headlines (Friendship Never Ends)" was directed by Anthony Mandler at Pinewood Studios and premiered in early November 2007. The video depicts the girls in a stately room, with plum-coloured walls and antique furniture, wearing gowns designed by Roberto Cavalli. "Headlines (Friendship Never Ends)" was performed by the group at the 2007 Victoria's Secret Fashion Show and Children in Need 2007, as well as on their reunion tour, The Return of the Spice Girls Tour (2007–2008).

== Background ==
"It feels like taking a little bit of the past. You feel that flavor but then it's moving on. The other girls chipped in later, adding lyrics. It's magical. Before we'd even got the final yes from everyone, we kind of started putting words down".

—Geri Halliwell talking about the song's development.

The plan of a Spice Girls' reunion was first confirmed by Mel B in June 2005. She stated, "We'll get back together because we all want to. I know everyone is up for it. There is going to be a greatest hits album and we've got loads of new songs that nobody has heard yet." On 28 June 2007, the group held a press conference at The O2 Arena revealing their intention to reunite. During the conference, the group confirmed their intention to embark upon a worldwide concert tour, starting in Vancouver on 2 December 2007. "I want to be a Spice Girl again. We are like sisters and we have our arguments, but by the end of the day we get back together", said Emma Bunton, while Melanie Chisholm commented that the tour "will be a proper good farewell to our fans".

Initially, singer George Michael agreed to write a comeback song for them, but took longer than expected, prompting Halliwell and Bunton to write another one instead. The group's comeback single, "Headlines (Friendship Never Ends)", was announced as the official Children in Need charity single for 2007, and released on radio on 23 October, whilst released digitally on 5 November and commercially on 19 November 2007. Geri Halliwell described the single as a "big love song" and "a Spice Girl classic". Chisholm, in her 2008 appearance on Never Mind the Buzzcocks, commented that she thought the song was not good at all, and that at least she was against the release of any new material when the record company was trying to market the Greatest Hits release. She would later say, "'Headlines' grew on me, it really came in to its own when we toured it, and it really felt lovely on stage".

== Composition ==
"Headlines (Friendship Never Ends)"
A sample of the song's chourus, with the group singing it together.

"Headlines (Friendship Never Ends)" was written by the Spice Girls, along with Richard Stannard and Matt Rowe, who also produced the song. Musically, "Headlines (Friendship Never Ends)" is a midtempo pop ballad. It is written in the key of D-flat Major, and moves at a slow tempo of 76 beats per minute. Lyrically, it talks about the group reuniting, mainly discussing their friendship throughout two decades together. They sing: "Let's make the headlines/loud and true/I wanna tell the world I'm giving it all to you/Let's make the headlines/loud and clear/the best things only happen when you are near". The song is built around an acoustic guitar, syncopated rhythms, and lilting croon-styled vocals. The subtitle references a line from their breakthrough hit, "Wannabe".

According to Spence D. from IGN, the song "pretty much fits the mold of the Girls previous outings of this down tempo variety", like "2 Become 1" and "Viva Forever". He commented, "if it hadn't been singled out as a new track you'd easily swear that it was a "lost" B-side from one of their previous albums". For Nick Levine from Digital Spy, "The Spice Girls' comeback single is as hip and modern as Jeremy Clarkson's dress sense: the simple drum loop could have been laid down while they were recording their debut album; the flamenco guitar riffs are pure 'Viva Forever'; and, nine years down the line, Mel C is still taking on all the money notes, adding some real oomph to the middle 8".

== Reception ==
=== Critical response ===
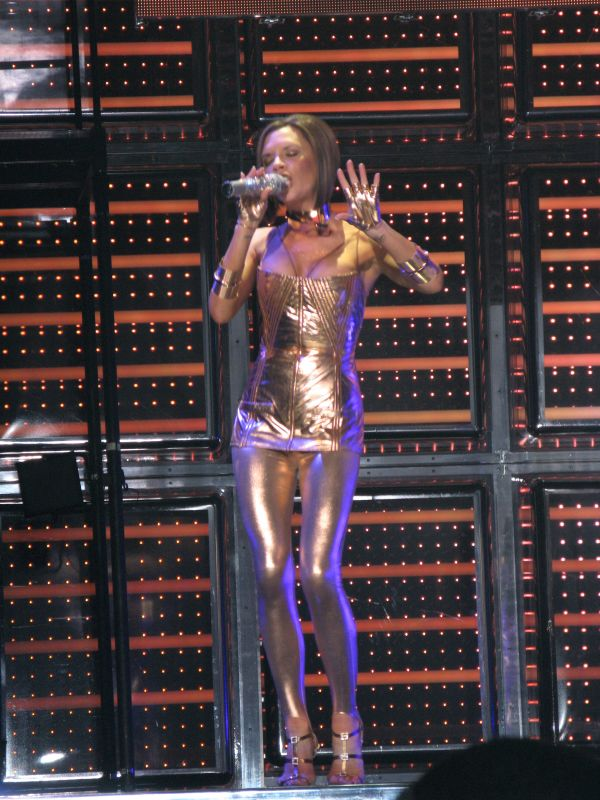
Victoria Beckham performing the song in Las Vegas, during the Return of the Spice Girls tour

"Headlines (Friendship Never Ends)" has received generally mixed to positive reviews from music critics. Talia Kraines, writing for BBC Music was positive in her review, and called the song a "classic Spice ballad". According to a writer from The Daily Collegian, "for the naysayers, who say the Spice Girls time has passed, two new tunes, "Headlines (Friendship Never Ends)" and "Voodoo" may grab your attention". Nick Levine from Digital Spy commented in his positive review, "'Headlines' won't be the first tune you skip to on the Spice Girls' Greatest Hits album – or, in all honesty, the tenth – but, as its pretty, gently melodic chorus surges gracefully, the feeling that comes over you is unmistakable. Nostalgia's a funny old thing, isn't it?"

NME gave it a mixed review, and said "new ballad "Headlines" is functional but lacks a certain, ahem, zig-a-zig aaaaaaargh." Stephen Thomas Erlewine from AllMusic gave it a mixed review, commenting that, along with "Voodoo", it was "forgettable" and a "sleepy" song. The reviewer also said that the song "isn't as self-referential or clever as its title suggests". However, Rosie Swash from The Guardian provided a negative review, stating, "the Spice Girls have never been the most sincere bunch of women and between an entirely forgettable melody and lyrics that go round in circles of crap about reaching into your soul and the time being now or never", completing that the biggest sound the song made was "the echo of total hollowness".

=== Commercial performance ===
"Headlines (Friendship Never Ends)" was first released in the United Kingdom. The song debuted at number 20 on 17 November 2007 on the UK Singles Chart, based on digital downloads. Two weeks later, the song climbed to its peak position of number 11, becoming the group's first single to miss the top two. Nevertheless, the single managed to reach number three on the UK Physical Singles Chart. The song debuted and peaked at number 90 on the US Billboard Hot 100, staying on the charts only for the week of 24 November 2007. "Headlines (Friendship Never Ends)" debuted at number 42 on the Canadian Hot 100, spending one week on the chart.

The song debuted at number 67 on the Austrian Singles Chart, the group's lowest-charting single in that country. The song debuted at number 52 on the Dutch Single Top 100 on 17 November 2007. It slipped to number 93 the following week, thus becoming the group's third single to miss the top 10 in that country. On 15 November 2007, "Headlines (Friendship Never Ends)" debuted at number three on the Swedish Singles Chart, the Spice Girls' highest-charting single since 1998's "Goodbye". The song stayed on the charts for five weeks. The song was also successful in Italy and Spain, peaking at number two in both countries.

== Music video ==
On 15 October 2007 episode of Dancing with the Stars, it was confirmed by Mel B that the Spice Girls would be filming a music video for "Headlines (Friendship Never Ends)" the following week. The filming took place at Pinewood Studios in Iver Heath, England, on 19 October 2007, and was directed by Anthony Mandler. Mel B commented, "We had such a laugh. It was great to be together again", and Victoria Beckham noted, "What's really wonderful is just being able to hang out with the girls again like this". A world exclusive screening of the video, which launched the run-up to the Children in Need night, aired on BBC One on 2 November 2007.

The video opens on a stately room, with plum-coloured walls and antique furniture. Bunton opens a large, black door and is followed by Halliwell, Beckham, Mel B and Chisholm. The girls are dressed in beautiful gowns throughout the video, presumably designed by Roberto Cavalli, who designed the costumes for their then-upcoming tour. Vignettes of the girls singing together and separately are sewn together to create a collage. Fading in and out, the music video ends with the girls combined although they are at different places.

== Live performances ==
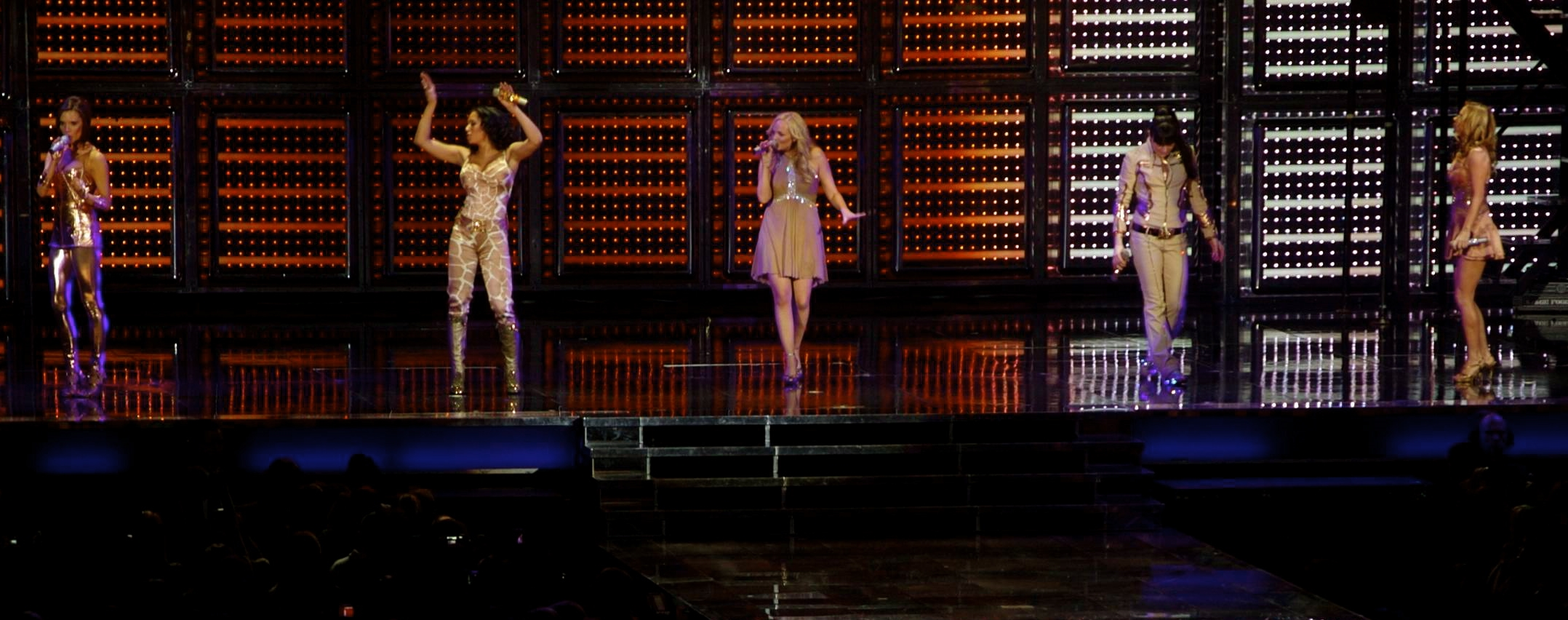
The Spice Girls performing "Headlines (Friendship Never Ends)" during The Return of the Spice Girls Tour

In November 2007, the group performed live together for the first time in nearly a decade at the 2007 Victoria's Secret Fashion Show, held in Los Angeles, California. The group dressed in military-themed outfits performed their old hit single "Stop", in front of giant glittering lights that spelled out "Spice" in the background. Then they performed "Headlines", wearing gowns from Roberto Cavalli, but the performance was excluded from the TV broadcast for unknown reasons. They also performed the songs at the Children in Need 2007 marathon.

"Headlines (Friendship Never Ends)" was also performed on their reunion tour, titled The Return of the Spice Girls Tour (2007–2008). Kitty Empire from The Observer reviewed the performance negatively, saying the song was "so unworthy of headlines that not even their fans have bought it". David Sinclair, whilst writing for The Sunday Times, also commented that "the pace flagged briefly with Headlines (Friendship Never Ends), the rather drab new song, which was accompanied by excerpts from its ill-judged promotional video". In 2019, Bunton confirmed to The Guardian that they would not perform the song on the Spice World – 2019 Tour.

== Track listings ==
- Digital download
1. "Headlines (Friendship Never Ends)" (radio version) – 3:29
- CD single
1. "Headlines (Friendship Never Ends)" – 3:30
2. "Wannabe" (Soul Seekerz 2007 Remix) – 6:55

== Credits and personnel ==
Credits adapted from the liner notes of Greatest Hits.

=== Management ===
- Published by Kobalt Music, Sony/ATV Music Publishing, Copyright Control and Peer Music (UK) Ltd.

=== Personnel ===
- Spice Girls – vocals
- Matt Rowe – production
- Richard Stannard – production
- Mark "Spike" Stent – mixing

== Charts ==
Chart performance for "Headlines (Friendship Never Ends)"
Chart (2007–2008)	Peak position
Argentina (CAPIF)	16
Australia (ARIA)	74
Austria (Ö3 Austria Top 40)	67
Belgium (Ultratip Bubbling Under Flanders)	11
Belgium (Ultratip Bubbling Under Wallonia)	19
Canada Hot 100 (Billboard)	42
Czech Republic Airplay (ČNS IFPI)	7
Germany (GfK)	46
Ireland (IRMA)	29
Italy (FIMI)	2
Netherlands (Tipparade)	8
Netherlands (Single Top 100)	52
Romania (Romanian Top 100)	64
Scotland Singles (OCC)	7
Slovakia Airplay (ČNS IFPI)	56
Spain (PROMUSICAE)	2
Sweden (Sverigetopplistan)	3
UK Singles (OCC)	11
UK Airplay (Music Week)	16
US Billboard Hot 100	90

== Release history ==
Release dates and formats for "Headlines (Friendship Never Ends)"
Region	Date	Format	Label	Ref.
United States	5 November 2007	Digital download	Virgin	
Germany	9 November 2007	CD single	EMI	
United Kingdom	19 November 2007	CD single	Virgin	
