= Live at Wembley Stadium (Spice Girls video) =

1998 video album by the Spice Girls

Video by Spice Girls
- Released: 9 November 1998
- Recorded: 20 September 1998
- Venue: Wembley Stadium, London
- Genre: Pop
- Length: 120 minutes
- Label: Virgin

Spice Girls video chronology
Girl Power! Live in Istanbul (1997)	Live at Wembley Stadium (1998)	Spice Girls in America: A Tour Story (1999)

Spice Girls Live at Wembley Stadium is the third video album by English girl group the Spice Girls. It was released on VHS on 9 November 1998 by Virgin Records, and was filmed at Wembley Stadium in London on 20 September 1998 during the Spiceworld Tour. The concert was first broadcast live in a pay-per-view special on Sky Box Office, and although the television broadcast was completely live, studio vocals were dubbed into several songs for the video version of the performance. It received a DVD release in the United Kingdom on 6 October 2008.

The show was recorded after Geri Halliwell left the band. Halliwell later revealed in the 2007 documentary film Giving You Everything that she watched the two-hour Sky One broadcast from her home in the United Kingdom after only quitting the band four months prior and said "it was one of the hardest things I've ever had to do" and that it was "so painful", to which Mel B jokingly replied, "That's her own fault".

== Set list ==
Act One

1. "Spiceworld Intro" (contains samples from "Wannabe", "Say You'll Be There", "2 Become 1" and "Mama")
2. "If U Can't Dance"
3. "Who Do You Think You Are" (contains samples of "Supermodel (You Better Work)")

Act Two

1. "Something Kinda Funny"
2. "Do It"
3. "Too Much"

Act Three

1. "Stop"
2. "Where Did Our Love Go?" (Emma Bunton solo performance)

Act Four

1. "Love Thing"

Act Five

1. "The Lady Is a Vamp"
2. "Say You'll Be There"
3. Interlude (with samples from Batman Forever (1995) for introduction)
4. "Naked"

Act Six

1. "2 Become 1"

Act Seven

1. "Sisters Are Doin' It for Themselves" (Mel B and Melanie C duet)
2. "Wannabe"
3. "Spice Up Your Life"
4. "Mama"

Act Eight

1. "Viva Forever" (contains samples from the motion picture Blade Runner and features additional vocals from Chickenshed)

Encore

1. "Never Give Up on the Good Times"
2. "We Are Family"

== Personnel ==
=== Vocals ===
- Victoria Beckham
- Mel B
- Emma Bunton
- Melanie C

=== Band ===
- Simon Ellis – musical direction, keyboards
- Andy Gangadeen – drums
- Paul Gendler – guitars
- Fergus Gerrand – percussion
- Steve Lewinson – bass guitar
- Michael Martin – keyboards

=== Dancers ===
- Takao Baba
- Carmine Canuso
- Jimmy Gulzar
- Eszteca Noya
- Robert Nurse
- Louie Spence

== Charts ==
Chart performance for Live at Wembley Stadium
Chart (1998)	Peak position
UK Music Videos (OCC)	6
US Top Music Videos (Billboard)	4

== Certifications ==
Certifications for Live at Wembley Stadium
Region	Certification	Certified units/sales
United Kingdom (BPI)	Platinum	50,000^{*}
United States (RIAA)	Platinum	100,000^{^}
^{*} Sales figures based on certification alone.^{^} Shipments figures based on certification alone.
