= Greatest Hits (Spice Girls album) =

2007 album by the Spice Girls

Greatest hits album by Spice Girls
- Released: 7 November 2007
- Recorded: 1995–2007
- Genre: Pop
- Length: 54:54
- Label: Virgin
- Producers: Absolute; Andy Bradfield; LaShawn "The Big Shiz" Daniels; Rodney Jerkins; Harvey Mason Jnr; Matt Rowe; Richard Stannard

Spice Girls chronology
| Forever (2000) | Greatest Hits (2007) | The Singles Collection (2026) |

Singles from Greatest Hits
- 1. "Headlines (Friendship Never Ends)" Released: 5 November 2007

Greatest Hits is a greatest hits album by the English girl group Spice Girls. It received a physical release worldwide throughout November 2007, except for the United States where it received a limited release on 6 November 2007 through Victoria's Secret and a full release on 15 January 2008. It was their first album to be released in seven years and was supported by an accompanying world tour. The album sold 1.7 million copies by the end of 2007 and was the world's best-selling girl group album of that year. In August 2012, after the Spice Girls' performance at the 2012 Summer Olympics in London, the album re-charted in the top ten, twenty and thirty of most major charts worldwide including the United Kingdom, United States, New Zealand and Australia.

The album's only single, "Headlines (Friendship Never Ends)", was released on radio on 23 October, whilst released digitally on 5 November and commercially on 19 November 2007. It was also announced as the official Children in Need charity single for 2007. The single managed to go to number three on the UK Physical Singles Chart.

== Background ==
"I think for us it's about celebrating the past, enjoying each other and it's about our fans. It was kind of now or never."

"A girl is allowed to change her mind [about the regrouping] and also this is something that we have only seriously started this year really. I think really all of us have had our fears and doubts but we feel that the time is right."

— Geri Halliwell and Melanie C talking about the group's reunion.

The plan to reform and release a greatest hits had long been speculated by the media, but its planned release was first confirmed by Melanie Brown in June 2005. She stated, "We'll get back together because we all want to. I know everyone is up for it. There is going to be a greatest hits album and we've got loads of new songs that nobody has heard yet." In 2007, rumours aroused again about the group's reunion. Melanie C commented about the rumours, saying "For the first time ever, there is some truth in the rumours…it could happen", but it would just be for "a very short space of time…a final goodbye", and a thank you to the fans. She also added that when it came to decide whether they would regroup or not, the singer was the last to make her decision, as she was "scared we couldn't do it again. It was a weird time of my life, I had a lot of personal s**t to get over after the Spice Girls".

On 28 June 2007, the group held a press conference at The O2 Arena to finally reveal their intention to reunite. During the conference, the group confirmed their intention to embark upon a worldwide concert tour, starting in Vancouver on 2 December 2007. The tour would cover six continents within 11 dates. "I want to be a Spice Girl again. We are like sisters and we have our arguments, but by the end of the day we get back together", said Emma Bunton, whilst Melanie C commented that the tour "will be a proper good farewell to our fans". Victoria Beckham also elaborated that "My main reason for doing this is for my kids - so they can see what mummy used to do. I'm going to be the cool one in the family for once!". They reportedly received £10 million each for the reunion.

== Release ==
The album was released in several different formats, including versions with bonus DVDs and CDs. The limited edition box set includes the normal standard edition CD, a karaoke CD, a remix CD, a DVD of the group's music videos, individual postcards of each Spice Girl and a friendship bracelet bearing the words Spice Girls. In the United States, the album was initially released only through Victoria's Secret stores, including three downloadable remixes of "Wannabe", "2 Become 1" and "Spice Up Your Life", Simon Fuller, the group's manager, said, "I am delighted to be working with Victoria's Secret on the Greatest Hits album and welcome their innovative approach to marketing". The album was released digitally via the iTunes Store on the same day. The album was released nationwide on 15 January 2008. Despite the revision of the Billboard charts in the United States, defining that albums sold by exclusive retailers were eligible to chart on the Billboard 200, Greatest Hits sold over 600,000 copies through Victoria's Secret stores, but was not eligible to chart in the week of 13 November 2007 due to Victoria's Secret not being SoundScan enabled.

== Artwork ==
The artwork for Greatest Hits was revealed through the group's official website in August 2007. According to the announcement, the group were all involved with the design, and were pleased with the outcome. It features a jewel encrusted logo, which pays homage to their debut album, Spice (1996). The jewels were designed by David Morris and each letter represents one member of the group. The "S" is made from amber and represents Victoria Beckham; the ruby pink "P" is Emma Bunton; Melanie C's letter "I" is made from a diamond; Geri Halliwell is the "C", made from amethyst stones and the emerald "E" is Melanie B. According to a source, they wanted something simple and stylish.

== Promotion ==
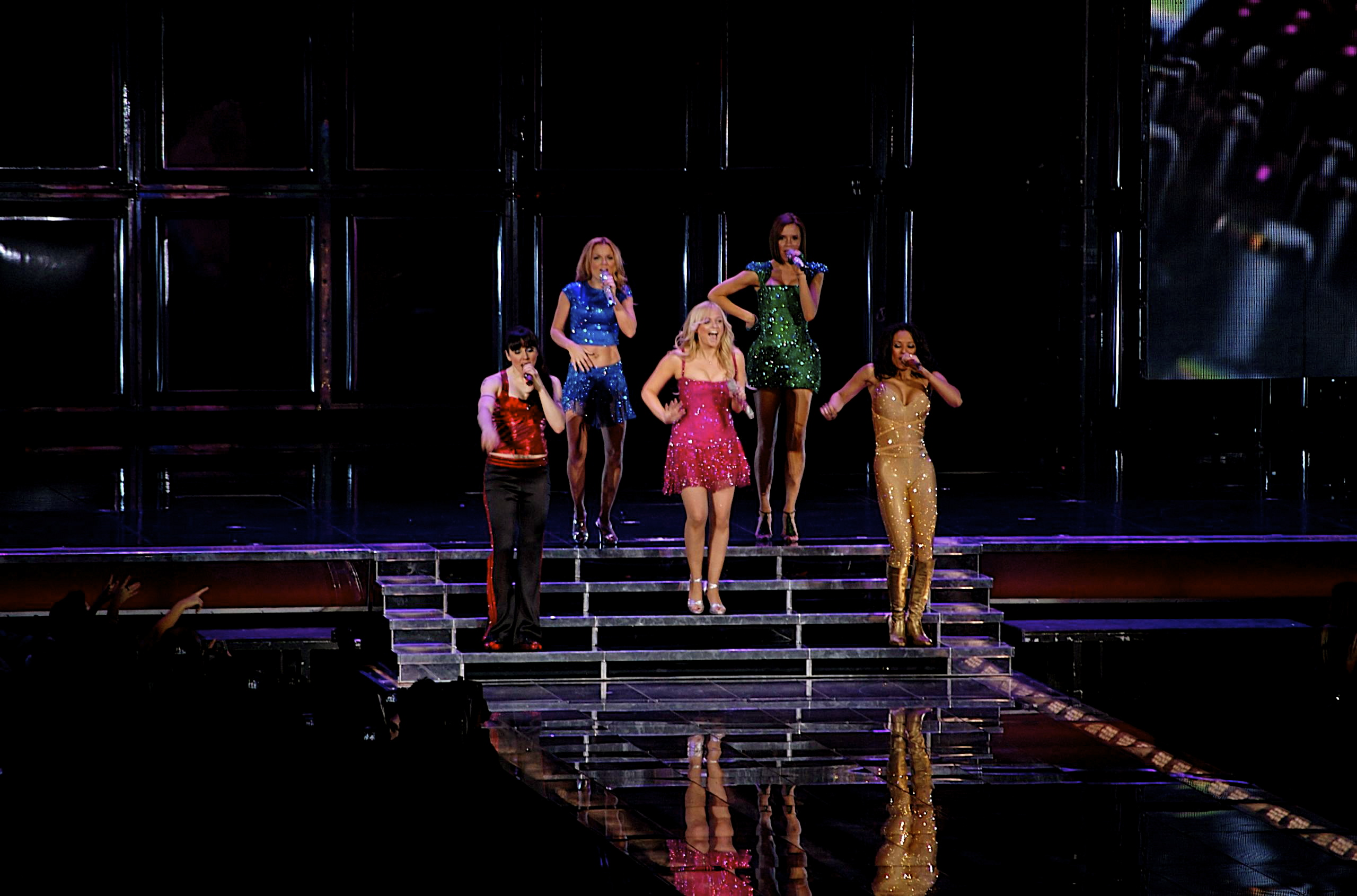
The Spice Girls performing their first worldwide hit "Wannabe" during their reunion tour

In November 2007, the group performed together for the first time in nearly a decade at the 2007 Victoria's Secret Fashion Show, held in Los Angeles, California. The group dressed in military-themed outfits performed "Stop" and "Headlines (Friendship Never Ends)" miming to a backing track, in front of giant glittering lights that spelled out "Spice" in the background. A taped performance of the group lyp-synching the songs, while dressed in blue sailor outfits, aired on 17 November 2007 for the Children in Need 2007 telethon. The song was also the official Children in Need single of 2007. In addition, they performed "2 Become 1" on the finale of the fifth season of the British television show Strictly Come Dancing.

Filmmaker Bob Smeaton, directed an official documentary on the reunion. It was entitled Spice Girls: Giving You Everything and was first aired on Australia's Fox8 on 16 December 2007, followed by BBC One in the United Kingdom, on 31 December. According to the group's manager Simon Fuller, it covered "the highs and the lows, the laughter and the tears. From their pre-Spice Girls days and the forming of the group, to the first taste of success, world domination and ultimately the break up and the aftermath."

On 28 June 2007, the group held a press conference at The O2 Arena revealing their intention to reunite and embark upon a tour. They announced The Return of the Spice Girls tour on their website, and it would start in Vancouver on 2 December 2007. Ticket sales for the first London date of the tour sold out in 38 seconds. It was reported that over one million people signed up in the UK alone and over five million worldwide for the ticket ballot on the band's official website. Sixteen additional dates in London had been added and sold out. In the United States, Las Vegas, Los Angeles and San Jose shows also sold out, prompting additional dates to be added. It was announced that the Spice Girls would be playing dates in Chicago, Detroit and Boston, as well as additional dates in New York to keep up with the demand. On the first concert in Canada, they performed to an audience of 15,000 people, singing twenty songs and changing a total of eight times. On 1 February 2008, it was announced that due to personal and family commitments their tour would come to an end in Toronto on 26 February 2008, meaning that tour dates in Beijing, Hong Kong, Shanghai, Sydney, Cape Town and Buenos Aires were cancelled.

== Single ==
The album's only new single, "Headlines (Friendship Never Ends)", was released on radio on 23 October, whilst released digitally on 5 November and commercially on 19 November 2007. It was also announced as the official Children in Need charity single for 2007. Spice Girls member Geri Halliwell described the song as a "big love song" and "a Spice Girl classic". "Headlines (Friendship Never Ends)" peaked at number 11 in the United Kingdom. However, the single managed to go to number three on the UK Physical Singles Chart.

== Reception ==
=== Critical response ===
Professional ratings
Review scores
| Source | Rating |
|---|---|
| AllMusic | 4.5/5 stars |
| The Austin Chronicle | 1/5 stars |
| BBC Music | positive |
| IGN | positive |
| NME | 6/10 stars |
| The Daily Collegian | A |

Stephen Thomas Erlewine of AllMusic wrote that the songs featured on the album "have aged exactly as you thought they might". Spence D. of IGN cited Greatest Hits as being "pretty much what you would expect it to be". According to a writer from The Daily Collegian, the greatest hits compilation "shows us that when these five women sing, they sound awesome", whilst also commenting that its members "have changed in their time away from each other, but the distinctive sound of the Spice Girls remains the same as it always was". Talia Kraines, writing for BBC Music was positive in her review, saying that "if you were one of the many haters of the Spice Girls back in the day, then this CD isn't going to change your mind about them. But if you grew up watching their every move, then this is a slice of nostalgia that miraculously still sounds fresh today". Nick Levine of Digital Spy website noted that "none of the group's three albums was devoid of filler, and their singles tended to be their very best songs, so Greatest Hits is a very welcome addition to the band's canon".

NME gave the compilation a mixed review, stating that "about halfway through this comp it hits home how dramatically the Spice Girls lost the plot", whilst commenting that songs like "Say You'll Be There" and "Goodbye" were "fine songs in any age". San Francisco Chronicle's Aidin Vaziri commented: "After an exuberant run out of the gate with delicious pop fodder such as "Wannabe" and "Say You'll Be There," things go horribly wrong midway through the set. All of a sudden, Ginger goes missing, self-awareness kicks in and the girls start playing catch-up with Destiny's Child, using songs that sound like that band's castoffs". San Antonio Current criticized their solo vocals and called them the reason why they did not have successful solo careers, and commented that it was "no surprise, then, that the Spices sound best in the anonymous disco surroundings" of "Who Do You Think You Are", "Stop", and "Spice Up Your Life". Criag Mathieson from The Age newspaper said "With their failed third album, Forever, getting cursory coverage, it's all about their first two discs", whilst adding that "their debut single Wannabe remains a zesty proposition", and "the plethora of sleeve photos allow you to compare before-and-after plastic surgery looks". Darcie Stevens of The Austin Chronicle gave the album one out of five stars and said "Fifteen songs of girl power, in case you didn't get enough the first time around".

=== Commercial performance ===
In the group's home country of the United Kingdom, the album missed the top spot, peaking at number two on the UK Albums Chart, beaten by Leona Lewis' Spirit by 300,000 copies. To date, it has sold in excess of 400,000 in the country. Despite missing number one in the United Kingdom, it managed to become the group's first number-one album in Australia, and was certified platinum there (for shipments of over 70,000 units).

For reasons stated above, despite selling over 600,000 copies through Victoria's Secret stores in the United States, the album barely made the top 100 of the Billboard 200, peaking at number 93. Elsewhere, the album peaked at number 3 in Ireland, number 15 in New Zealand, and managed to peak inside the top 20 in Italy, the top 50 in Sweden and Germany, and the top 75 in Switzerland, Austria, and the Netherlands. The album made the top 10 at number 7 on the European Top 100 Albums chart, published by Billboard. In August 2012, after the Spice Girls' performance at the 2012 Summer Olympics in London, the album re-charted in the top ten, twenty and thirty of most major charts worldwide including the United Kingdom, United States, New Zealand and Australia.

In June 2019, Greatest Hits was certified Double platinum for sales of 600,000 in the UK. In August 2020, the album was certified Gold by IFPI Denmark for sales of 10,000.

== Track listing ==
| No. | Title | Writer(s) | Producer(s) | Length |
|---|---|---|---|---|
| 1. | "Wannabe" (single edit; from Spice, 1996) | Spice Girls; Richard Stannard; Matt Rowe | Rowe; Stannard | 2:54 |
| 2. | "Say You'll Be There" (single mix; from Spice) | Spice Girls; Jonathan Buck; Eliot Kennedy | Absolute | 3:58 |
| 3. | "2 Become 1" (single version; from Spice) | Spice Girls; Stannard; Rowe | Rowe; Stannard; Andy Bradfield^{[a]} | 4:04 |
| 4. | "Mama" (radio version; from Spice) | Spice Girls; Stannard; Rowe | Rowe; Stannard | 3:42 |
| 5. | "Who Do You Think You Are" (radio version; from Spice) | Spice Girls; Andy Watkins; Paul Wilson | Absolute | 3:46 |
| 6. | "Move Over (Generation Next)" ((from Spiceworld, 1997) | Spice Girls; Clifford Lane; Stannard; Mary Wood | Rowe; Stannard | 2:44 |
| 7. | "Spice Up Your Life" (Stent radio mix, from Spiceworld) | Spice Girls; Stannard; Rowe | Rowe; Stannard | 2:56 |
| 8. | "Too Much" (radio edit; from Spiceworld) | Spice Girls; Watkins; Wilson | Absolute | 3:53 |
| 9. | "Stop" (single edit; from Spiceworld) | Spice Girls; Watkins; Wilson | Absolute | 3:26 |
| 10. | "Viva Forever" (radio edit; from Spiceworld) | Spice Girls; Stannard; Rowe | Rowe; Stannard | 4:14 |
| 11. | "Let Love Lead the Way" (radio edit; from Forever, 2000) | Victoria Beckham; Melanie Brown; Emma Bunton; Melanie Chisholm; LaShawn "The Big Shiz" Daniels; Fred Jerkins III; Rodney Jerkins; Harvey Mason Jr. | Mason Jr.; Daniels; Jerkins | 4:16 |
| 12. | "Holler" (radio edit; from Forever) | Beckham; Brown; Bunton; Chisholm; Daniels; Jerkins III; Jerkins | Daniels; Jerkins | 3:57 |
| 13. | "Headlines (Friendship Never Ends)" (new recording) | Spice Girls; Stannard; Rowe | Rowe; Stannard | 3:31 |
| 14. | "Voodoo" (new recording) | Spice Girls; Stannard; Rowe | Rowe; Stannard | 3:11 |
| 15. | "Goodbye" (single edit; non-album single, 1998; later released on Forever) | Beckham; Brown; Bunton; Chisholm; Stannard; Rowe | Rowe; Stannard | 4:22 |
| Total length: | | | | 54:54 |

iTunes Store bonus tracks
| No. | Title | Writer(s) | Producer(s) | Length |
|---|---|---|---|---|
| 16. | "Wannabe" (Junior Vasquez Gomis dub) | Spice Girls; Stannard; Rowe | Rowe; Stannard | 6:38 |
| 17. | "Tell Me Why" (Jonathan Peters edit) | Beckham; Brown; Bunton; Jerkins; Daniels; Jerkins III; Mischke Butler | Daniels; Jerkins | 3:24 |
| 18. | "Say You'll Be There" (Junior's X-Beats) | Spice Girls; Buck; Kennedy | Absolute | 6:57 |
| 19. | "Girl Power" (video) | | | 5:26 |

International special edition bonus DVD
| No. | Title | Writer(s) | Director(s) | Length |
|---|---|---|---|---|
| 1. | "Wannabe" | Spice Girls; Stannard; Rowe | Johan Camitz |
| 2. | "Say You'll Be There" | Spice Girls; Buck; Kennedy | Vaughan Arnell |
| 3. | "2 Become 1" | Spice Girls; Stannard; Rowe | Big TV |
| 4. | "Mama" | Spice Girls; Stannard; Rowe | Big TV |
| 5. | "Who Do You Think You Are" | Spice Girls; Watkins; Wilson | Gregg Masuak |
| 6. | "Spice Up Your Life" | Spice Girls; Stannard; Rowe | Marcus Nispel |
| 7. | "Too Much" | Spice Girls; Watkins; Wilson | Howard Greenhalgh |
| 8. | "Stop" | Spice Girls; Watkins; Wilson | James Brown |
| 9. | "Viva Forever" | Spice Girls; Stannard; Rowe | Steve Box |
| 10. | "Let Love Lead the Way" | Beckham; Brown; Bunton; Chisholm; Daniels; Jerkins III; Jerkins; Mason Jnr | Masuak |
| 11. | "Holler" | Beckham; Brown; Bunton; Chisholm; Daniels; Jerkins III; Jerkins | Jake Nava |
| 12. | "Goodbye" | Beckham; Brown; Bunton; Chisholm; Stannard; Rowe | Greenhalgh |

US special edition bonus DVD
| No. | Title | Writer(s) | Director(s) | Length |
|---|---|---|---|---|
| 12. | "Headlines (Friendship Never Ends)" | Spice Girls; Stannard; Rowe | Anthony Mandler |
| 13. | "Goodbye" | Beckham; Brown; Bunton; Chisholm; Stannard; Rowe | Greenhalgh |

Box set karaoke CD
| No. | Title | Writer(s) | Producer(s) | Length |
|---|---|---|---|---|
| 1. | "Wannabe" (karaoke version) | Spice Girls; Stannard; Rowe | Rowe; Stannard | 2:54 |
| 2. | "Say You'll Be There" (karaoke version) | Spice Girls; Buck; Kennedy | Absolute | 3:58 |
| 3. | "2 Become 1" (karaoke version) | Spice Girls; Stannard; Rowe | Rowe; Stannard; Bradfield^{[a]} | 4:04 |
| 4. | "Mama" (karaoke version) | Spice Girls; Stannard; Rowe | Rowe; Stannard | 3:42 |
| 5. | "Who Do You Think You Are" (karaoke version) | Spice Girls; Watkins; Wilson | Absolute | 3:46 |
| 6. | "Move Over" (karaoke version) | Spice Girls; Lane; Stannard; Wood | Rowe; Stannard | 2:44 |
| 7. | "Spice Up Your Life" (karaoke version) | Spice Girls; Stannard; Rowe | Rowe; Stannard | 2:56 |
| 8. | "Too Much" (karaoke version) | Spice Girls; Watkins; Wilson | Absolute | 3:53 |
| 9. | "Stop" (karaoke version) | Spice Girls; Watkins; Wilson | Absolute | 3:26 |
| 10. | "Viva Forever" (karaoke version) | Spice Girls; Stannard; Rowe | Rowe; Stannard | 4:14 |
| 11. | "Let Love Lead the Way" (karaoke version) | Beckham; Brown; Bunton; Chisholm; Daniels; Jerkins III; Jerkins; Jnr | Mason Jnr; Daniels; Jerkins | 4:16 |
| 12. | "Holler" (karaoke version) | Beckham; Brown; Bunton; Chisholm; Daniels; Jerkins III; Jerkins | Daniels; Jerkins | 3:57 |
| 13. | "Goodbye" (karaoke version) | Beckham; Brown; Bunton; Chisholm; Stannard; Rowe | Rowe; Stannard | 4:22 |

Box set remix disc
| No. | Title | Length |
|---|---|---|
| 1. | "Wannabe" (Motiv 8 Vocal Slam Mix) | 6:21 |
| 2. | "Say You'll Be There" (Junior's Main Pass) | 8:35 |
| 3. | "2 Become 1" (Dave Way Remix) | 4:02 |
| 4. | "Mama" (Biffco Mix) | 5:50 |
| 5. | "Who Do You Think You Are" (Morales Club Mix) | 9:31 |
| 6. | "Spice Up Your Life" (Murk Cuba Libre Mix) | 8:07 |
| 7. | "Too Much" (SoulShock & Karlin Remix) | 3:54 |
| 8. | "Stop" (Morales Remix) | 7:25 |
| 9. | "Viva Forever" (Tony Rich Remix) | 5:21 |
| 10. | "Holler" (MAW Remix) | 8:32 |
| 11. | "Goodbye" (Orchestral Mix) | 4:16 |

Victoria's Secret edition bonus downloads
| No. | Title | Length |
|---|---|---|
| 1. | "Wannabe" (Soul Seekerz Edit) | 3:31 |
| 2. | "Spice Up Your Life" (Ralphi's Radio Edit) | 3:38 |
| 3. | "2 Become 1" (Georgie Porgie's Radio Edit) | 4:02 |

=== Notes ===
- ^{^[a]} signifies an additional producer

== Charts ==
=== Weekly charts ===
| Chart (2007–2008) | Peak position |
|---|---|
| Argentine Albums (CAPIF) | 8 |
| Australian Albums (ARIA) | 1 |
| Austrian Albums (Ö3 Austria) | 70 |
| Belgian Albums (Ultratop Flanders) | 62 |
| Belgian Albums (Ultratop Wallonia) | 78 |
| Canadian Albums (Billboard) | 11 |
| Dutch Albums (Album Top 100) | 73 |
| European Top 100 Albums (Billboard) | 7 |
| German Albums (Offizielle Top 100) | 50 |
| Greek Albums (IFPI) | 9 |
| Irish Albums (IRMA) | 3 |
| Italian Albums (FIMI) | 20 |
| Japanese Albums (Oricon) | 18 |
| Mexican Albums (Top 100 Mexico) | 34 |
| New Zealand Albums (RMNZ) | 15 |
| Scottish Albums (Official Charts) | 6 |
| Spanish Albums (Promusicae) | 23 |
| Swedish Albums (Sverigetopplistan) | 50 |
| Swiss Albums (Schweizer Hitparade) | 52 |
| Taiwanese Albums (G-Music) | 6 |
| UK Albums (Official Charts) | 2 |
| US Billboard 200 | 93 |

=== Year-end charts ===
| Chart (2007) | Peak position |
|---|---|
| Australian Albums (ARIA) | 36 |
| UK Albums (OCC) | 42 |

== Certifications and sales ==
| Region | Certification | Certified units/sales |
|---|---|---|
| Australia (ARIA) | Platinum | 70,000^{^} |
| Brazil (Pro-Música Brasil) | Gold | 30,000^{*} |
| Canada (Music Canada) | Gold | 50,000^{^} |
| Denmark (IFPI Danmark) | Gold | 10,000^{‡} |
| Ireland (IRMA) | Platinum | 15,000^{^} |
| New Zealand (RMNZ) | Gold | 7,500^{^} |
| United Kingdom (BPI) | 3× Platinum | 900,000^{‡} |
| United States | — | 600,000 |
^{*} Sales figures based on certification alone.^{^} Shipments figures based on certification alone.^{‡} Sales+streaming figures based on certification alone.

== Release history ==
| Country | Date | Format | Label |
|---|---|---|---|
| Japan | 7 November 2007 | CD; CD+DVD | EMI Music Japan |
| Germany | 9 November 2007 | Box set; CD; CD+DVD | EMI |
| United Kingdom | 12 November 2007 | Box set; CD; CD+DVD | Virgin |
| Canada | 13 November 2007 | CD | Virgin |
| United States | 13 November 2007 | CD | Virgin |
| Japan | 28 November 2007 | Box set | EMI Music Japan |
| United States | 15 January 2008 | Box set; CD; CD+DVD | Virgin |
| Japan | 10 February 2010 | CD | EMI Music Japan |
| Japan | 5 December 2012 | CD | EMI Music Japan |
| Japan | 11 June 2014 | SHM-CD | EMI Music Japan |
| United Kingdom | 5 July 2019 | Limited edition LP | UMC |
| United Kingdom | 13 March 2020 | LP | UMC |
