= 2 Become 1 =

1996 single by the Spice Girls

Single by Spice Girls

from the album Spice
- B-side: "One of These Girls"; "Sleigh Ride"; "2 Become 1" (Spanish version)
- Released: 16 December 1996
- Recorded: 10 December 1995
- Studio: Strongroom, London
- Genre: Pop
- Length: 4:01 (album version); 4:05 (single version)
- Label: Virgin
- Songwriters: Spice Girls; Matt Rowe; Richard Stannard
- Producers: Matt Rowe; Richard Stannard

Spice Girls singles chronology
"Say You'll Be There" (1996)	"2 Become 1" (1996)	"Mama" / "Who Do You Think You Are" (1997)

Music video
- "2 Become 1" on YouTube

"2 Become 1" is a song by the British girl group the Spice Girls. Written by the group members, together with Matt Rowe and Richard Stannard during the group's first professional songwriting session, it was produced by Rowe and Stannard for the group's debut album, Spice (1996). "2 Become 1" is an R&B-influenced pop ballad that features instrumentation from a guitar, an electronic keyboard and string instruments. The lyrics focus on the bonding of two lovers, and they also address the importance of safe sex. Its Big TV!-directed music video, which features the group performing against time-lapse footage of Times Square in New York City, was completely shot against a blue screen at a studio in London. The backdrop was later superimposed.

Released as the group's third single on 16 December 1996 by Virgin, it was generally well received by music critics and was a commercial success. It topped the UK Singles Chart for three weeks, becoming the group's third consecutive chart-topper, their second million-selling single, and their first Christmas number-one single in the United Kingdom. In July 1997, the song was released in the United States, peaking at number four on the Billboard Hot 100, and receiving a gold certification by the Recording Industry Association of America (RIAA). It performed similarly internationally, peaking inside the top ten on the majority of the charts that it entered. The song was named "Song of the Year" at the 1998 ASCAP London Music Awards.

In 2019, Emma Bunton covered the song, as a duet, with Robbie Williams on her fourth solo album, My Happy Place. In December 2024, an orchestral version by Bunton with the Budapest Scoring Orchestra was released.

== Background ==
In December 1994, the Spice Girls persuaded their former managers—father-and-son team Bob and Chris Herbert—to set up a showcase in front of industry writers, producers and A&R men at the Nomis Studios in Shepherd's Bush, London. Producer Richard Stannard was originally at the studio to meet pop star Jason Donovan, but he ended up in the showcase after hearing Melanie Brown, as she went charging across the corridor. Stannard recalls:

More than anything, they just made me laugh. I couldn't believe I'd walked into this situation. You didn't care if they were in time with the dance steps or whether one was overweight or one wasn't as good as the others. It was something more. It just made you feel happy. Like great pop records.

Stannard stayed after everyone had left the showcase to talk to the group. He then reported back to his songwriter partner Matt Rowe that he had found the pop group of their dreams. In January 1995, Chris Herbert booked the group's first professional songwriting session with the producers at the Strongroom in Curtain Road, East London. Rowe remember feeling similarly to Stannard when he first met the group, "I love them. Immediately. [...] They were like no one I'd met before, really." The session was productive as the duo seemed to get along with the group; together they discussed the songwriting process and what they wanted to do with the record. In her autobiography, Brown recalled that the duo instinctively understood their point of view and knew how to incorporate "the spirit of five loud girls into great pop music".

== Writing and inspiration ==
It's basically a love song, but it's got a message—make sure you put a condom on if you're going to have sex. We all think that's very important!

— Melanie Brown talking about the song's theme.

"2 Become 1" was co-written by the Spice Girls along with partners Richard Stannard and Matthew Rowe. Stannard and Rowe also co-produced the track. After writing more uptempo dance-based songs, such as "Wannabe", the group and the two producers decided to write a slow ballad. But as the group were writing the song, they realised that it was a bit too slushy, so it was decided to address the importance of contraception with the lyrics: "Be a little bit wiser, baby. Put it on, put it on".

The song was inspired by the "special relationship" that was developing between Geri Halliwell and Rowe. Brown hinted at this development in her autobiography, commenting: "When [Rowe] and Geri started making eyes at each other I knew what was going on, even though they denied it. I knew them both too well for it to be a secret for me." Stannard commented about the fondness between Halliwell and Rowe: "I don't want to get into the side of things. They were very close. They clicked. And I think the lyrics in '2 Become 1' came from that, especially the first verse, which they wrote together."

=== Spanish version ===
The group recorded a European Spanish version of the song, written by them, Rowe, Stannard, and N. Maño. The title was "2 Become 1" (Spanish Version), although the title is loosely translated in one line of the song, "Seremos Uno Los Dos". It was released as the eleventh track of their debut album, Spice, in Latin America and South Africa, in a special re-edition of the album in Spain, and as one of the tracks of the "2 Become 1" maxi-single in the US. A Spanglish edit that traded verses between the English and Spanish versions was created by DJ Mike Rizzo and production director Bill Schultz for New York-based radio WKTU.

== Composition ==
2 Become 1
A 25-second sample from "2 Become 1" featuring Bunton singing the first verse. The sound of string arrangements is used as a background.

"2 Become 1" is a pop ballad with R&B influences, written in the key of F♯ major; it is set in the time signature of common time and moves at a slow tempo of 72 beats per minute. The song is constructed in a verse–chorus form, and its instrumentation comes from a guitar, an electronic keyboard, and string instruments. The song opens with an instrumental introduction, with a chord progression of E♭m add_{9}–D♭/F–G♭–A♭m_{7} sus_{4}, that is also used during the first part of the verses. The last two lines of each verse changes the progression to C♭–B♭m_{7}–A♭m_{7}–D♭_{11}, and changes again during each chorus to G♭–D♭–C♭–D♭. It closes with a string outro that uses the chord progression F♭–G♭–B♭♭–C♭, which is arranged by Scottish composer Craig Armstrong.

The lyrics focus on how the bonding of two lovers can become so strong that they practically become one entity, through the act of sexual intercourse. Apart from the sexual connotations, there is an aspirational undercurrent to the lyrics, and like many of their subsequent songs, desire is explicitly linked to ambition: "Free your mind of doubt and danger/Be for real don't be a stranger/We can achieve it/We can achieve it".

Two different versions of the song, each with different lyrics, were recorded: in the album version, the two first verses are sung by Melanie C and Melanie Brown, Emma Bunton sings the pre-choruses, the next second two verses are sung by Melanie C and Geri Halliwell, and the first and third lines of the chorus are sung by Bunton and Halliwell together, the second and fourth lines are sung by Melanie C and Victoria Beckham together and the fifth line is sung by Brown. The second line of the second verse, "Any deal that we endeavour/Boys and girls feel good together", was changed in the single version to: "Once again if we endeavour/Love will bring us back together". Halliwell sings on the album version, while Beckham sings on the single version, after Halliwell confessed that she had a hard time singing in that particular key. Bunton later stated that the lyric change was necessary after realising that the group had become LGBT icons. Despite the original lyrics still being used in album pressings of Spice, due to the album not being revised since 1997, the single version appeared on the 25th anniversary reissue of the album, in place of the album version. The single version also contains slightly different vocals from the rest of the group.

The single version appears in the music video and is available on the group's Greatest Hits album, and on stage the girls always performed the single version before and after Halliwell's departure.

== Release ==
"2 Become 1" was released in the United Kingdom on 16 December 1996, in three single versions. The first one, a maxi single that included the single version of the track, an orchestral take, the Junior Vasquez remix of "Wannabe", and "One of These Girls", a song written by the group with Paul Wilson and Andy Watkins—the songwriters and production duo known as Absolute. The second version was the special Christmas pack, a standard CD single in a cardboard case that included a signed postcard with a Christmas message from the group. This version contained the single version, the Dave Way remix, and their own version of Leroy Anderson's "Sleigh Ride". The third version was a two-track cassette single, featuring the single version and the orchestral take of the song. The same track listing was also used for the release of the European CD single. In the United States, the single was serviced to contemporary hit radio on 1 July 1997. Four weeks later, on 29 July, two CD singles were issued in the US.

== Reception ==
=== Critical response ===
The song was generally well received by music critics. Brian Grosz from Albumism described it as "a smooth R&B jam". Stephen Thomas Erlewine of AllMusic called it a "perfect adult contemporary confection". In a review of the group's 2007 compilation album, Greatest Hits, Talia Kraines of BBC Music called it "shimmering", adding that "only a cold heart could fail to love their first festive #1". Larry Flick of Billboard magazine said that "they are surprisingly adept at weaving warm and romantic imagery over a sweet melody", adding that "[Everyone] will delight in the track's arrangement of soft harmonies and delicate acoustic guitar riffs". Greg Kot of the Chicago Tribune said that their first album "is a compendium of slick secondhand urban pop encompassing [...] G-funk synths on 'Say You'll Be There' [...] and Babyface's guitar and strings balladry on '2 Become 1'". Digital Spy's Nick Levine noted that the group's slower songs were "probably their strongest suit", and thought that the song "manages to combine every element of the perfect Christmas ballad–a touch of elegance, a hint of romance, a soupcon of sexiness and a generous sprinkling of sparkle–and still finds time for a coy safe sex message". Whitney Pastorek of Entertainment Weekly said that it is "too slow, and the lyrics appear to have been written by a safe-sex-loving unicorn", adding that "it's almost impossible to identify the individual Spice Girls by their voices here, so airbrushed are the proceedings". A reviewer from Music Week rated the song five out of five, adding, "No turkey this as Spice Girls virtually guarantee a third chart topper and look a strong bet for the Christmas number one with a seasonally lush ballad. Anticipate much smooching 'neath the mistletoe." Time magazine's Christopher John Farley called it a "slumberous ballad [...] [that] seem[s] designed to amuse, titillate, ingratiate". In a review of the group's debut album Spice, Dev Sherlock of Yahoo! Music Radio called it a "glossy ballad that would do Mariah Carey proud".

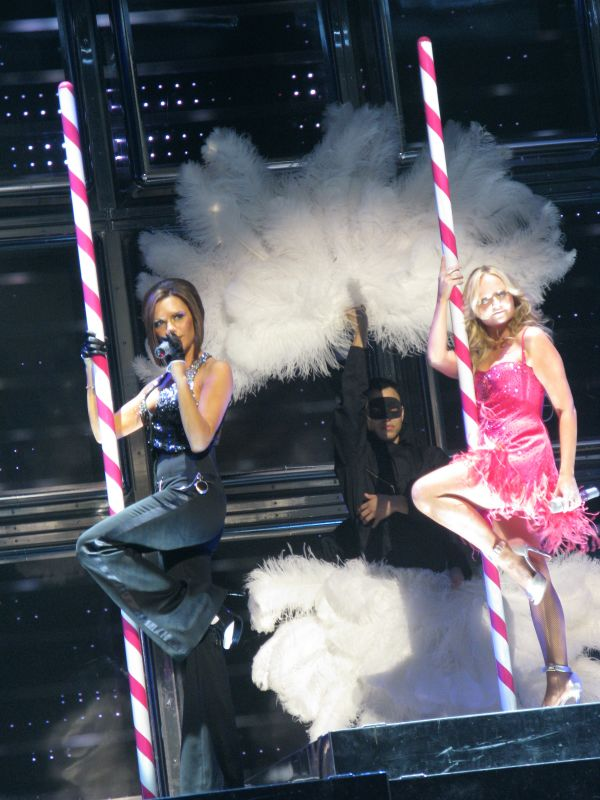
Victoria Beckham and Emma Bunton in Las Vegas, Nevada, on 11 December 2007, performing "2 Become 1".

=== Chart performance ===
"2 Become 1" was originally going to be released in the UK on 9 December 1996, but the release date was delayed to let Dunblane's "Knockin' on Heaven's Door"—a tribute to the children killed at the Dunblane Primary School in Scotland—stay at the top of the UK Singles Chart. The single was released the next week, debuting at the top, becoming the group's third chart-topper and their first Christmas number-one single in the UK. It sold 209,000 copies in the first three days of release and 462,000 in the first week, becoming the fifth best-selling single of the year. "2 Become 1" sold 1.14 million copies in total, giving the Spice Girls their second and final million-selling single in the UK. Despite being released during the final two weeks of 1996, "2 Become 1" was the 5th best seller of the year and that year's fastest selling single of the year.

In Ireland, "2 Become 1" was the group's second number-one single, and their first to debut at the top of the Irish Singles Chart. It stayed at the top position for six weeks, and became their first Christmas number-one single in the country. "2 Become 1" peaked at No. 3 on the Eurochart Hot 100, and performed similarly across the rest of Europe, topping the maxi-singles chart of Spain, peaking inside the top ten in Austria, Denmark, Finland, France, Italy, the Netherlands, Norway, Sweden and Switzerland, and inside the top fifteen in Belgium and Germany. It was also commercially successful in Australia and New Zealand, peaking inside the top three on both countries.

In July 1997, "2 Become 1" debuted on the Canadian RPM 100 Hit Tracks chart at No. 87, peaked at No. 3 on its fifth week, and ended at No. 25 on the year-end chart. On the Adult Contemporary chart, it peaked at No. 4, and ended at No. 27 on the year-end chart. In the United States, the song debuted on 16 August 1997 at No. 6, reaching a peak of No. 4 in its fourth week, becoming the group's third consecutive top five in the country. The song has sold 700,000 copies in the US as of December 1997. It peaked at four on the Top 40/Mainstream chart and had crossover success, peaking at four on the Rhythmic Top 40 and at number eight on the Adult Contemporary chart.

== Music video ==
=== Background ===
The music video for "2 Become 1" was directed between 5 and 6 November 1996 by Big TV! at a studio in Old Compton Street, London. Cinematographer Stephen Keith-Roach, who worked in other music videos such as Jamiroquai's "Virtual Insanity" and U2's "Discothèque", was in charge of the photography. The shoot involved the group dressed in winter attire, wandering around the studio against a green screen, interspersed with close-up camera angles, so that the backdrop could be superimposed later. To achieve the effect of the wind rippling through their hair, the group was required to lip synch the song in double time while wind machines were blowing on them.

=== Synopsis ===
The music video features the group members in various places in New York City, including Times Square, with fast moving cars appearing around multi-coloured lights; scenes of the members appearing alone, with one other member, or as a quintet, are intercut with scenes of lovers experiencing moments of togetherness. According to the group's first official book Girl Power!, the closing scene, which features a deer in the middle of Times Square, gave them a running gag all throughout the shoot—"Whenever anyone made a mistake it was, 'Oh, deer'." Sometimes, the closing scene would not be shown on television, due to the song fading out following a 40-second instrumental.

In the same book, Victoria Beckham wrote about the shoot: "I think '2 Become 1' is my favourite video. [...] It was really different to the other videos–shot entirely in the studio, with high technology and loads of effects. It was really weird having to sing passionately into the camera, I was feeling a right mug in front of all those people singing 'wanna make love to ya baby'."

== Live performances ==
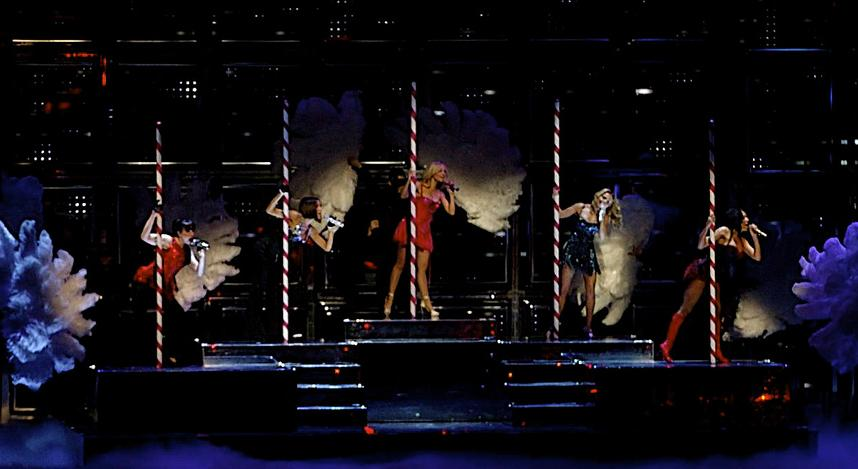
The Spice Girls performing "2 Become 1" at the Air Canada Centre in Toronto, Ontario, Canada, during the Return of the Spice Girls tour.

The song was performed many times on television, including the Bravo Supershow, GMTV, Live & Kicking, Noel's House Party, and Top of the Pops. In October 1997, the group performed "2 Become 1" as the eighth song of their first live concert at the Abdi İpekçi Arena in Istanbul, Turkey. The performance was broadcast on Showtime in a pay-per-view event titled Spice Girls in Concert Wild!, and was later included in the VHS and DVD release Girl Power! Live in Istanbul. The group was scheduled to perform the song on the semi-final of the fifth season of the British television show Strictly Come Dancing, on 16 December, but it was postponed to the finale, 22 December, as Emma sprained her ankle badly and was not able to perform.

The Spice Girls have performed the song on their four tours, the Spiceworld Tour, the Christmas in Spiceworld Tour, the Return of the Spice Girls Tour and the Spice World - 2019 Tour. After Halliwell's departure in 1998, Bunton sang the first and third lines of the chorus alone during the Spiceworld Tour, but in the Christmas in Spiceworld Tour Beckham replaced Halliwell during the first and third lines of the chorus along with Bunton, while Brown replaced Beckham during the second and fourth lines of the chorus along with Melanie C. The performance at the Spiceworld Tour's final concert can be found on the video: Spice Girls Live at Wembley Stadium, filmed in London, on 20 September 1998. For the Return of the Spice Girls Tour, the group performed it during the second segment of the show. After the "Too Much" performance, each of the girls emerged from a cocoon of oversized swan wings and danced around a set of barber's poles while singing the song. For the Girls return without Beckham for Spice World - 2019 Tour, Halliwell sang a mixture of her and Beckham's original lines – "Any deal that we endeavour/Love will bring us back together...". This was the first time Halliwell had sung a solo live on the track since the Spice debut album.

== Cover versions ==
"2 Become 1" has been covered both in albums and live performances:

- In 1998, The Countdown Singers recorded a sound-alike version of the song for their album Today's Love Songs.
- Lester Bowie's Brass Fantasy did an instrumental jazz cover for the 1999 album The Odyssey of Funk & Popular Music.
- American guitarist Paul Gilbert covered the song for his fourth album, Alligator Farm.
- Wildside recorded a dance remake for the 1997 album Mega Hits Dance Party, Vol. 1, which was later included on the 2005 album Let's Hear It for the 90's, Vol. 1.
- Filipino bossa nova singer Sitti Navarro recorded a cover of the song for her second album, My Bossa Nova.
- During her solo career, Emma Bunton has performed live covers of the song on television programmes such as CD:UK and Popworld, and it was also included as part of her set list for the Pepsi Silver Clef Concert. She performed the song as a duet twice with her former bandmate Melanie C on 9 November 2013 as part of the Oxford Street Lights Switch on and on 11 January 2014 for Sporty's Forty at 02 Shepherd's Bush Empire.
- Olly Alexander of the band Years & Years performed the song with special guest Melanie C at a charity event at London's Union Chapel.
- In December 2016, Melanie C performed the song with former bandmate Victoria Beckham at the latter's New Year's Eve party concert. She also performed the song on her own for a live session on BBC Radio 2 in January 2017, and with both Bunton and Nicole and Natalie Appleton from All Saints at her one off concert for her 50th birthday at Koko in London in January 2024.
- In 2019, Bunton covered the song, as a duet, with Robbie Williams on her fourth solo album, My Happy Place. In October 2021, Chris Martin of Coldplay performed a duet of the song with Melanie C at the Hollywood Bowl for the Audacy 8th Annual "We Can Survive" concert.
- On 20 December 2024, Emma Bunton released an solo, orchestral version of "2 Become 1"; the single was created with the Budapest Scoring Orchestra. Bunton performed the single on the Christmas special of BBC's Strictly Come Dancing, which aired on 25 December 2024.

== Formats and track listings ==
- UK CD1; Australian, Brazilian, European, and South African CD
1. "2 Become 1" (single version) – 4:05
2. "2 Become 1" (orchestral version) – 4:05
3. "One of These Girls" – 3:33
4. "Wannabe" (Junior Vasquez remix edit) – 5:57
- UK CD2
1. "2 Become 1" (single version) – 4:05
2. "2 Become 1" (Dave Way remix) – 4:01
3. "Sleigh Ride" – 3:18
- European and French 2-track CD
1. "2 Become 1" (single version) – 4:05
2. "2 Become 1" (orchestral version) – 4:05
- Japanese CD
1. "2 Become 1" (single version) – 4:05
2. "2 Become 1" (orchestral version) – 4:05
3. "One of These Girls" – 3:33
4. "Sleigh Ride" – 3:18
- US CD1
1. "2 Become 1" (single version) – 4:05
2. "One of These Girls" – 3:33
- US CD2
1. "2 Become 1" (single version) – 4:05
2. "2 Become 1" (Dave Way remix) – 4:01
3. "One of These Girls" – 3:33
4. "2 Become 1" (Spanish version) – 4:05
5. "2 Become 1" (orchestral version) – 4:05
- Spanish 12-inch vinyl single

A1. "2 Become 1" (single version) – 4:05
A2. "2 Become 1" (orchestral version) – 4:05
B1. "Wannabe" (Junior Vasquez remix edit) – 5:57
B2. "One of These Girls" – 3:33

- UK 12-inch vinyl single

A1. "2 Become 1" (Dave Way remix) – 4:01
B1. "Wannabe" (Junior Vasquez remix edit) – 5:57
B2. "Wannabe" (Junior Vasquez Gomix dub) – 6:36

- Digital EP
1. "2 Become 1" (single version) – 4:05
2. "2 Become 1" (orchestral version) – 4:05
3. "One of These Girls" – 3:33
4. "Wannabe" (Junior Vasquez remix edit) – 5:57
5. "2 Become 1" (Dave Way remix) – 4:01
6. "Sleigh Ride" – 3:18

== Credits and personnel ==
- Spice Girls – lyrics, vocals
- Matt Rowe – lyrics, producer, keyboards and programming
- Richard Stannard – lyrics, producer, keyboards and programming
- Andy Bradfield – additional production and audio mixing
- Adrian Bushby – recording engineer
- Patrick McGovern – assistant
- Pete Davis, Paul Waller and Statik – additional programming
- Greg Lester – guitar
- Craig Armstrong – string arrangement
- Isobel Griffiths – orchestral contractor
- Perry Montague-Masson – orchestral leader
- Mark "Spike" Stent – audio mixing
- Dave Way – remixing
- Published by Windswept Pacific Music Ltd. and PolyGram Music Publishing Ltd.

== Charts ==
=== Weekly charts ===
Weekly chart performance for "2 Become 1"
Chart (1996–1997)	Peak position
Australia (ARIA)	2
Austria (Ö3 Austria Top 40)	9
Belgium (Ultratop 50 Flanders)	11
Belgium (Ultratop 50 Wallonia)	5
Czech Republic (IFPI CR)	7
Canada Top Singles (RPM)	3
Canada Adult Contemporary (RPM)	4
Canada Dance/Urban (RPM)	18
Denmark (IFPI Danmark)	7
Estonia (Eesti Top 20)	2
Estonia Airplay (Eesti Top 15)	2
Europe (European Hot 100)	3
Finland (Suomen virallinen lista)	9
France (SNEP)	4
Germany (GfK)	13
Hungary (Mahasz)	9
Iceland (Íslenski Listinn Topp 40)	13
Ireland (IRMA)	1
Israel (IBA)	1
Italy (FIMI)	9
Italy Airplay (Music & Media)	3
Latvia (Latvijas Top 20)	2
Lithuania (M-1)	8
Netherlands (Dutch Top 40)	3
Netherlands (Single Top 100)	2
New Zealand (Recorded Music NZ)	3
Norway (VG-lista)	3
Scottish Singles Sales (Official Charts)	1
Spain Maxi-Singles(AFYVE)	1
Sweden (Sverigetopplistan)	7
Switzerland (Schweizer Hitparade)	10
UK Singles (Official Charts)	1
UK Airplay (Music Week)	1
UK Pop Tip Club Chart (Music Week) with "Wannabe"	1
US Billboard Hot 100	4
US Adult Contemporary (Billboard)	8
US Adult Pop Airplay (Billboard)	27
US Dance Singles Sales (Billboard)	24
US Pop Airplay (Billboard)	4
US Rhythmic Airplay (Billboard)	4

=== Year-end charts ===
1996 year-end chart performance for "2 Become 1"
Chart (1996)	Position
UK Singles (OCC)	5
UK Pop Tip Club Chart (Music Week) with "Wannabe"	48

1997 year-end chart performance for "2 Become 1"
Chart (1997)	Position
Australia (ARIA)	32
Belgium (Ultratop 50 Flanders)	72
Belgium (Ultratop 50 Wallonia)	65
Brazil (Crowley)	5
Canada Top Singles (RPM)	25
Canada Adult Contemporary (RPM)	27
Europe (European Hot 100)	19
France (SNEP)	41
Germany (Media Control)	72
Netherlands (Dutch Top 40)	42
Netherlands (Single Top 100)	85
New Zealand (RIANZ)	37
Romania (Romanian Top 100)	28
Sweden (Topplistan)	96
UK Singles (OCC)	35
UK Airplay (Music Week)	44
US Billboard Hot 100	35
US Rhythmic Top 40 (Billboard)	24
US Top 40/Mainstream (Billboard)	24

== Certifications and sales ==
Certifications and sales for "2 Become 1"
Region	Certification	Certified units/sales
Australia (ARIA)	Platinum	70,000^{^}
Belgium (BRMA)	Gold	25,000^{*}
France (SNEP)	Gold	250,000^{*}
New Zealand (RMNZ)	Gold	15,000^{‡}
Norway (IFPI Norway)	Gold	
United Kingdom (BPI)	2× Platinum	1,523,000
United States (RIAA)	Platinum	1,036,000
^{*} Sales figures based on certification alone.^{^} Shipments figures based on certification alone.^{‡} Sales+streaming figures based on certification alone.

== Release history ==
Release dates and formats for "2 Become 1"
Region	Date	Format(s)	Label(s)	Ref.
France	16 December 1996	Maxi CD	EMI	
Germany	16 December 1996	Maxi CD	EMI	
United Kingdom	16 December 1996	Cassette; two maxi CDs	Virgin	
Japan	21 December 1996	Maxi CD	Toshiba EMI	
France	7 February 1997	CD	EMI	
Australia	6 April 1997	Maxi CD	EMI	
United States	1 July 1997	Contemporary hit radio	Virgin	
United States	29 July 1997	CD	Virgin	
United States	12 August 1997	Maxi CD	Virgin	

== Bibliography ==
- Brown, Melanie (2002). Catch a Fire: The Autobiography. Headline Book Publishing. ISBN 0-7553-1063-2.
- Cripps, Rebecca; Peachey, Mal; Spice Girls (1997). Real Life: Real Spice The Official Story. Zone/Chameleon Books. ISBN 0-233-99299-5.
- De Ribera Berenguer, Juan (1997). Colección: Ídolos del Pop-Spice Girls (in Spanish). Editorial La Máscara. ISBN 84-7974-236-4.
- Golden, Anna Louise (1997). The Spice Girls. Ballantine Books. ISBN 0-345-41965-0.
- Halliwell, Geraldine (1999). If Only. Delacorte Press. ISBN 0-385-33475-3.
- McGibbon, Rob (1997). Spice Power: The Inside Story. Macmillan Publishers Ltd. ISBN 0-7522-1142-0.
- Sinclair, David (2004). Wannabe: How the Spice Girls Reinvented Pop Fame. Omnibus Press. ISBN 0-7119-8643-6.
- Spice Girls (1997). Girl Power!. Zone/Chameleon Books. ISBN 0-233-99165-4.
- Spice Girls (2008). Spice Girls Greatest Hits (Piano/Vocal/Guitar) Artist Songbook. Hal Leonard Corporation. ISBN 978-1-4234-3688-1.
