= Forever (Spice Girls album) =

2000 studio album by the Spice Girls

Studio album by Spice Girls
- Released: 1 November 2000
- Recorded: July 1998 ("Goodbye"); August 1999 – July 2000
- Genres: Pop; R&B
- Length: 49:28
- Label: Virgin
- Producers: Rodney Jerkins; Jimmy Jam and Terry Lewis; Harvey Mason Jr.; Matt Rowe; Robert Smith; Richard Stannard; Uncle Freddie

Spice Girls chronology
| Spiceworld (1997) | Forever (2000) | Greatest Hits (2007) |

Singles from Forever
- 1. "Holler" / "Let Love Lead the Way" Released: 23 October 2000

Forever is the third and final studio album by English girl group the Spice Girls, released on 1 November 2000 by Virgin Records. It is their only album without Geri Halliwell, who had left the group in 1998.

Forever peaked at number two on the UK Albums Chart, becoming the group's only studio album to not top the UK charts. It was later certified Platinum by the British Phonographic Industry (BPI). The album reached number 39 on the US Billboard 200. Worldwide, the album has sold over two million copies.

The lead and only single, the double A-side "Holler" and "Let Love Lead the Way", went on to debut at number one on the UK Singles Chart, becoming the group's ninth number one single. Their 1998 Christmas single "Goodbye", released almost two years earlier, was also included on the album as the closer. "Tell Me Why", "Weekend Love", and "If You Wanna Have Some Fun" were released as promotional singles from the album, with the latter having a montage music video released exclusively to European music stations.

== Background ==
During the Spiceworld Tour in early 1998, the group took on an initial project to write and record songs for a possible third album and a live album. The original concept for this album was to showcase solo songs, duets, and cover songs featuring all five members, in order to promote the idea that the Spice Girls were all individuals, yet could come together as one. The girls went to Dublin's Windmill Lane Studios with longtime collaborators Richard Stannard and Matt Rowe to work on a new album and create master recordings for a live album. With the sudden departure of Geri Halliwell, the project took a major turn, with many of the already produced songs scrapped and the live album cancelled.

The Spice Girls recorded their Christmas single, "Goodbye", in July 1998, during the North American leg of their Spiceworld Tour. Once again, the girls teamed up with Stannard and Rowe. The following year, they recorded "My Strongest Suit" for the concept album for the musical Aida. In the two years between the release of "Goodbye" in December 1998 and the release of Forever in November 2000, the group, along with the pop-music landscape in general, changed dramatically. Hoping to cultivate a more mature image, the group teamed up with a team of American producers to give Forever a more R&B sound. However, initial recording sessions maintained the pop sound of their previous works.

== Recording ==
Recording for the album initially began in mid-1999, and the first tracks recorded for the album were recorded at Abbey Road Studios with Stannard and Rowe. The group continued working on tracks through August and September, working on tracks with Eliot Kennedy at Steelworks Studios and tracks with Rodney Jerkins and Jimmy Jam and Terry Lewis at Whitfield Street Studios respectively. Following these sessions, work on the album was put on a pause. Melanie Chisholm began promoting her first solo album Northern Star, released in October, and the group began preparations for the Christmas in Spiceworld tour, in which they premiered the tracks "Right Back At Ya", "W.O.M.A.N." and "Holler". Following the tour, Chisholm continued to promote Northern Star, and the other members worked on preparing their own solo material. Recording for the album did not resume until April 2000, when further tracks were recorded with Jerkins in Miami, followed by the final recording session on 17 July 2000.

Sessions with Stannard and Rowe were eventually scrapped from the album, and Kennedy's only surviving contribution to the album was "Right Back at Ya", included on the album in a re-recorded, remixed, R&B form that Kennedy described as a "plodding, boring, bottom drawer R&B song". In an interview with biographer David Sinclair, Stannard relayed his disappointment in the omission of "W.O.M.A.N.": "I thought that song was really interesting lyrically, because it was making the progression from girls to women, which was something Matt and I thought it was time for them to do. They needed something to suggest that they were still the same group of friends, but they were gaining more maturity." Bunton explained that the song was not included because "the sound [had] moved on" in the time since it was recorded.

== Release and promotion ==
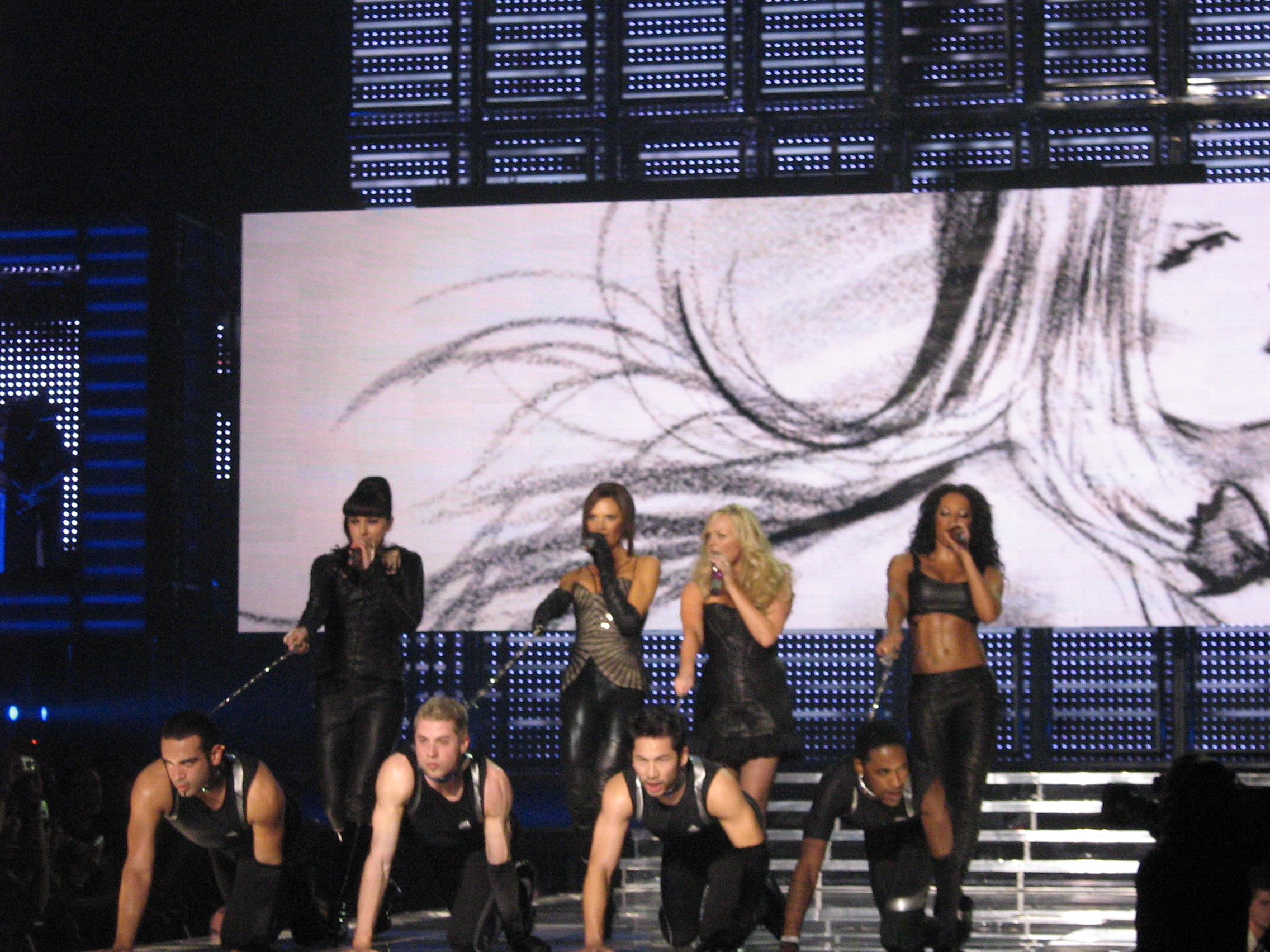
The Spice Girls as a four-piece performing "Holler" in Cologne, Germany in 2007

In August 2000, the album's title was revealed through a poll on the group's official website, in which fans voted for what they thought the title would be. The album's cover has the girls "clinging to each other as if they were holding on for dear life", according to PopMatters's Peter Piatkowski.

EMI Music Japan first released Forever in Japan on 1 November 2000, with a remix of "Holler" serving as a bonus track. It was distributed five days later in the United Kingdom by Virgin Records and on 7 November in North America by EMI. The album leaked on Napster a week prior to its release.

To promote Forever, the Spice Girls performed "Holler" and "Let Love Lead the Way" on British televised shows such as The National Lottery Stars, SMTV Live, Top of the Pops and CD:UK. The group also gave a performance "Holler" at the 2000 MTV Europe Music Awards on 16 November 2000 in Stockholm, Sweden; before the performance, Chisholm declared that it would be their last appearance together before going on a hiatus to focus on their solo careers. During the performance, the group wore leather outfits, ending with them going through the floor with large orange pyrotechnic flames blazing up. Additionally, the band's members hosted TFI Friday on 10 November, as part of the album's promotion.

In October 2000, Melanie Brown mentioned that a tour to promote Forever would take place in late 2001 and that it would be global, including dates in America. However, the tour never came to fruition due to their solo projects.

The Spice Girls did not heavily promote Forever as much as their previous albums, and the promotional campaign was ceased in December 2000 as the group went on an indefinite hiatus. The following month, group member Emma Bunton officially stated that "the record seems to have come to a natural end. I want to concentrate on solo projects and there is no time to release a single now. All our individual projects are scheduled and we wouldn't have time for any promotion."

=== Singles ===
"Holler" and "Let Love Lead the Way" were chosen to serve as the official lead single from Forever. Released as a double A-side single, it was released commercially in the United Kingdom on 23 October 2000 as a CD and cassette single. It debuted at number one on the UK Singles Chart and became the Spice Girls' ninth number-one single in the United Kingdom, tying with ABBA's nine singles that have reached the top of the charts, and behind only The Beatles, Elvis Presley, Cliff Richard and Madonna as the acts with the most UK number-one singles. It also peaked in the top 10 in several other countries in Europe, including Denmark, Ireland, Italy and Spain. In Canada, the songs were released separately; "Holler" reached number two, whereas "Let Love Lead the Way" peaked at number five on the chart compiled by Nielsen Soundscan. The music videos released for the tracks depicted the girls playing one of the four elements each.

On 18 October 2000, Emma Bunton revealed that the group would not be releasing a Christmas single that year. The following January, she confirmed that no further singles would be released from the album. "Tell Me Why", "Weekend Love", and "If You Wanna Have Some Fun" were released as promotional singles in November 2000. An official promotional montage video was released for "If You Wanna Have Some Fun" the same month which was compiled from previously released footage. "Tell Me Why" had several commissioned remixes, only one of which was commercially released as a bonus track seven years later on the deluxe edition of Greatest Hits. The final promotional push for the Forever album was a promotional single featuring these remixes that was released in Australia in the summer of 2001 as a competition prize in a cross-promotion with TV Hits Magazine.

== Critical reception ==
Professional ratings
Aggregate scores
| Source | Rating |
|---|---|
| Metacritic | 45/100 |
Review scores
| Source | Rating |
| AllMusic | 2/5 stars |
| The Baltimore Sun | 2.5/5 stars |
| Dotmusic | 1/5 stars |
| entertainment.ie | 2/5 stars |
| Entertainment Weekly | C |
| The Guardian | 2/5 stars |
| Jam! | 4/5 stars |
| Los Angeles Times | 2.5/4 stars |
| Rolling Stone | 2.5/5 stars |
| The New Rolling Stone Album Guide | 2/5 stars |

Forever received mixed reviews from music critics. At Metacritic, which assigns a normalised rating out of 100 to reviews from mainstream publications, the album received an average score of 45, based on nine reviews. In a mixed review, James Hunter of Rolling Stone expressed that "Forever will probably provoke a reaction somewhere in the middle—with one exception, it's just OK." Music critics had ambivalent opinions on the record's change in sound compared to the group's previous releases. Stephen Thomas Erlewine of AllMusic wrote that on Forever, the Spice Girls "make all the right moves, hiring superstar producer Rodney Jerkins to helm most of the tracks and attempting to seem mature, but this all results in a record that is curiously self-conscious and flat". Andrew Lynch from entertainment.ie opined, "The production is as slick as ever, but a huge part of that old Girl Power enthusiasm seems to have drained and fallen away—and with it most of the fun that used to redeem their fundamental tackiness." David Browne of Entertainment Weekly commented, "Every genre cliché, from homogenized harmonies to delicately plucked stringed instruments to male rapper interjections, is securely in place. The music is so tasteful, restrained, and assembly line proficient that it makes early singles like 'Say You'll Be There' sound like the rawest punk rock." Betty Clarke of The Guardian gave Forever a negative review, stating it "ultimately makes you yearn for those heady dans when the Spice Girls were pop and proud of it."

Other reviews were more positive of the album's production. Michael Paoletta of Billboard gave the album a positive review, stating it "oozes with timely funk beats and the kind of well-crafted songs that No. 1 hits are made of." In a positive review, Stephanie McGrath from Jam! wrote that the album was the group's attempt at "toning down their former flashiness and giving their catchy brand of pop music a sophisticated twist." She wrote that the group sounded "more comfortable" with the album's style and described it as being "full of good pop music." Natalie Nichols from the Los Angeles Times described the vocals on the album as an improvement over those on its predecessor, writing that "the girls muster more vocal passion and authority" when compared to Spiceworld. A review from The Sonic Net wrote that the album sounded "very professional" but also wrote that "only a hardcore fan can deny that the bloom is definitely off the rose."

== Commercial performance ==
Forever debuted at number two on the UK Albums Chart with 71,000 copies sold in its first week, over 160,000 copies behind Westlife's Coast to Coast. The album spent a total of 10 weeks on the chart. It was certified Platinum by the British Phonographic Industry (BPI) on 17 November 2000, denoting shipments in excess of 300,000 copies. In the United States, the album debuted at number 39 on the Billboard 200, selling 34,000 copies in its first week. It spent seven weeks on the chart. By July 2006, it had sold 207,000 copies in the US.

In Australia, it peaked at number nine, and was certified Gold. The album reached number 10 in Austria, and was also certified Gold. In Canada, it peaked at number six and was certified double Platinum, the highest certification achieved for Forever. The album also peaked at number six in Germany, and was certified Gold. In Ireland, it peaked at number 15. The album reached number 25 on the charts in New Zealand, where it was certified Gold. In Switzerland, it peaked at number 11 and was certified Platinum. As of January 2001, Forever had sold two million copies worldwide.

== Track listing ==
| No. | Title | Writer(s) | Producer(s) | Length |
|---|---|---|---|---|
| 1. | "Holler" | Victoria Beckham; Melanie Brown; Emma Bunton; Melanie Chisholm; Rodney Jerkins; LaShawn Daniels; Fred Jerkins III | Jerkins; LaShawn "The Big Shiz" Daniels^{[a]} | 4:15 |
| 2. | "Tell Me Why" | Beckham; Brown; Bunton; Jerkins; Daniels; Jerkins III; Mischke Butler | Jerkins; Daniels^{[a]} | 4:13 |
| 3. | "Let Love Lead the Way" | Beckham; Brown; Bunton; Chisholm; Jerkins; Daniels; Jerkins III; Harvey Mason Jr. | Mason Jr.; Jerkins; Daniels^{[a]} | 4:57 |
| 4. | "Right Back at Ya" | Beckham; Brown; Bunton; Chisholm; Eliot Kennedy; Tim Lever | Uncle Freddie; Daniels^{[a]}; Kennedy^{[b]}; Sue Drake^{[b]} | 4:09 |
| 5. | "Get Down with Me" | Beckham; Brown; Bunton; Jerkins; Daniels; Jerkins III; Butler; Robert Smith | Jerkins; Smith; Daniels^{[a]} | 3:45 |
| 6. | "Wasting My Time" | Brown; Bunton; Chisholm; Daniels; Jerkins III | Uncle Freddie; Daniels^{[a]} | 4:13 |
| 7. | "Weekend Love" | Beckham; Brown; Bunton; Chisholm; Jerkins; Daniels; Jerkins III | Jerkins; Daniels^{[a]} | 4:04 |
| 8. | "Time Goes By" | Beckham; Brown; Bunton; Jerkins; Daniels; Jerkins III; Butler | Jerkins; Uncle Freddie; Daniels^{[a]} | 4:51 |
| 9. | "If You Wanna Have Some Fun" | Beckham; Brown; Bunton; Chisholm; James Harris III; Terry Lewis | Jimmy Jam and Terry Lewis | 5:25 |
| 10. | "Oxygen" | Beckham; Brown; Bunton; Chisholm; Harris III; Lewis | Jimmy Jam and Terry Lewis | 4:55 |
| 11. | "Goodbye" | Beckham; Brown; Bunton; Chisholm; Richard Stannard; Matt Rowe | Stannard; Rowe | 4:35 |

Japanese edition bonus track
| No. | Title | Writer(s) | Producer(s) | Length |
|---|---|---|---|---|
| 12. | "Holler" (MAW remix) | Beckham; Brown; Bunton; Chisholm; Jerkins; Daniels; Jerkins III | Jerkins; Daniels^{[a]}; Masters at Work^{[c]} | 8:30 |

=== Notes ===
- ^{^[a]} signifies a vocal producer
- ^{^[b]} signifies an additional vocal producer
- ^{^[c]} signifies a remixer

== Personnel ==
Credits adapted from the liner notes of Forever.

=== Musicians ===
- Eliot Kennedy – backing vocals (track 4)
- Sue Drake – backing vocals (track 4)
- Jimmy Jam and Terry Lewis – arrangement, all musical instruments (tracks 9, 10)
- Wil Malone – strings arrangement (track 11)
- Paul Waller – drum programming (track 11)

=== Technical ===
- Rodney Jerkins – production, mixing (tracks 1–3, 5, 7, 8)
- LaShawn "The Big Shiz" Daniels – vocal production (tracks 1–8)
- Harvey Mason Jr. – Pro Tools (tracks 1, 3, 7); production (track 3)
- Brad Gilderman – recording, mixing (tracks 1, 3, 7)
- Dave Russell – recording assistance (tracks 1, 3, 4, 6, 7)
- Ian Robertson – recording assistance (tracks 1, 3, 7)
- Paul Foley – recording (tracks 2, 5, 8)
- Ben Garrison – mixing (tracks 2, 4–6, 8); recording (tracks 4, 6)
- Fred Jerkins III – production (as Uncle Freddie) (tracks 4, 6, 8); mixing (tracks 4, 6)
- Eliot Kennedy – additional vocal production (track 4)
- Sue Drake – additional vocal production (track 4)
- Robert Smith – production (track 5)
- Jimmy Jam and Terry Lewis – production (tracks 9, 10)
- Steve Hodge – engineering, mixing (tracks 9, 10)
- Brad Yost – engineering assistance, mixing assistance (tracks 9, 10)
- Xavier Smith – engineering assistance, mixing assistance (tracks 9, 10)
- Tony Salter – vocal engineering (tracks 9, 10)
- Richard Stannard – production (track 11)
- Matt Rowe – production (track 11)
- Adrian Bushby – engineering (track 11)
- Jake Davies – engineering assistance (track 11)
- Mark "Spike" Stent – mixing (track 11)
- Paul Walton – mixing assistance (track 11)
- Jan Kybert – mixing assistance (track 11)
- Bernie Grundman – mastering at Bernie Grundman Mastering (Los Angeles)

=== Artwork ===
- Terry Richardson – photography
- Vince Frost – design

== Charts ==
=== Weekly charts ===
Weekly chart performance for Forever
| Chart (2000) | Peak position |
|---|---|
| Australian Albums (ARIA) | 9 |
| Australian Dance Albums (ARIA) | 5 |
| Austrian Albums (Ö3 Austria) | 10 |
| Belgian Albums (Ultratop Flanders) | 44 |
| Belgian Albums (Ultratop Wallonia) | 39 |
| Canadian Albums (Billboard) | 6 |
| Dutch Albums (Album Top 100) | 30 |
| European Albums (Music & Media) | 5 |
| Finnish Albums (Suomen virallinen lista) | 24 |
| French Albums (SNEP) | 43 |
| German Albums (Offizielle Top 100) | 6 |
| Greek Albums (IFPI) | 4 |
| Hungarian Albums (MAHASZ) | 20 |
| Icelandic Albums (Tónlist) | 14 |
| Irish Albums (IRMA) | 15 |
| Italian Albums (FIMI) | 11 |
| Japanese Albums (Oricon) | 12 |
| Malaysian Albums (RIM) | 2 |
| New Zealand Albums (RMNZ) | 25 |
| Norwegian Albums (VG-lista) | 26 |
| Polish Albums (ZPAV) | 22 |
| Scottish Albums (Official Charts) | 4 |
| Singapore Albums (SPVA) | 4 |
| Spanish Albums (AFYVE) | 26 |
| Swedish Albums (Sverigetopplistan) | 24 |
| Swiss Albums (Schweizer Hitparade) | 11 |
| UK Albums (Official Charts) | 2 |
| US Billboard 200 | 39 |

Weekly chart performance for Forever
| Chart (2020) | Peak position |
|---|---|
| UK Albums Downloads | 66 |
| UK Vinyl Albums | 15 |

Weekly chart performance for Forever 25th anniversary release
| Chart (2025) | Peak position |
|---|---|
| UK Albums Sales | 47 |
| UK Physical Albums | 45 |
| UK Vinyl Albums | 22 |

=== Year-end charts ===
Year-end chart performance for Forever
| Chart (2000) | Position |
|---|---|
| Australian Albums (ARIA) | 74 |
| Canadian Albums (Nielsen SoundScan) | 99 |
| UK Albums (OCC) | 59 |

== Certifications and sales ==
Certifications for Forever
| Region | Certification | Certified units/sales |
|---|---|---|
| Australia (ARIA) | Gold | 35,000^{^} |
| Austria (IFPI Austria) | Gold | 25,000^{*} |
| Belgium (BRMA) | Gold | 25,000^{*} |
| Brazil (Pro-Música Brasil) | Gold | 100,000^{*} |
| Canada (Music Canada) | 2× Platinum | 200,000^{^} |
| Finland | — | 10,029 |
| France (SNEP) | Gold | 100,000^{*} |
| Germany (BVMI) | Gold | 150,000^{^} |
| Netherlands (NVPI) | Gold | 40,000^{^} |
| New Zealand (RMNZ) | Gold | 7,500^{^} |
| South Korea | — | 12.159 |
| Spain (Promusicae) | Gold | 50,000^{^} |
| Switzerland (IFPI Switzerland) | Platinum | 50,000^{^} |
| United Kingdom (BPI) | Platinum | 300,000^{^} |
| United States | — | 208,000 |
Summaries
| Worldwide | — | 2,000,000 |
^{*} Sales figures based on certification alone.^{^} Shipments figures based on certification alone.

== Release history ==
Release dates and formats for Forever
| Region | Version | Date | Format | Label | Ref. |
|---|---|---|---|---|---|
| Japan | Standard | 1 November 2000 | CD | EMI Music Japan | |
| United Kingdom | Standard | 6 November 2000 | CD | Virgin | |
| Canada | Standard | 7 November 2000 | CD | EMI | |
| United States | Standard | 7 November 2000 | CD | Virgin | |
| Various | Forever25 | 7 November 2025 | Vinyl | Virgin | |
