= Goodbye (Spice Girls song) =

1998 single by Spice Girls

Single by Spice Girls
- B-side: "Christmas Wrapping"; "Sisters Are Doin' It for Themselves"; "We Are Family"
- Released: 24 November 1998
- Recorded: July 1998
- Studio: Ocean Way (Nashville)
- Genre: Pop
- Length: 4:35
- Label: Virgin
- Songwriters: Spice Girls; Richard Stannard; Matt Rowe
- Producers: Richard Stannard; Matt Rowe

Spice Girls singles chronology
"Viva Forever" (1998)	"Goodbye" (1998)	"Holler" / "Let Love Lead the Way" (2000)

Music video
- "Goodbye" on YouTube

"Goodbye" is a song recorded by British girl group Spice Girls. It was written by the group, Richard Stannard, and Matt Rowe, while it was produced by the latter two. The song became the group's first song without the vocals of Geri Halliwell. It was released by Virgin Records on 24 November 1998 and was later included on their third studio album Forever (2000). "Goodbye" is a pop ballad that lyrically consists of the group's farewell to a friend, specifically Halliwell. The lyrics were also seen, by the media and fans alike, as the group's end, although the idea was dismissed by the members.

"Goodbye" received positive reviews from music commentators, who said it was one of the group's best singles. The song was a commercial success, peaking atop the UK Singles Chart and making the Spice Girls the first act to have had three consecutive Christmas number-one singles since the Beatles in 1965. Internationally, it was also commercially successful, reaching the top spots in Canada, New Zealand, Ireland and Italy and peaking inside the top five on the charts in Australia, Denmark, El Salvador, Finland, Hungary, Malaysia, Netherlands, Sweden and Taiwan. Additionally, "Goodbye" peaked at number 11 on the US Billboard Hot 100.

The accompanying music video for "Goodbye" was filmed at Mentmore Towers and featured the group singing the song at a castle; Melanie Brown and Victoria Beckham were both pregnant at the time. To promote "Goodbye", the Spice Girls performed the song on several television shows, such as the Royal Variety Performance and Top of the Pops, and later on their concert tours Christmas in Spiceworld (1999), The Return of the Spice Girls (2007–2008) and Spice World – 2019 Tour (2019).

== Background ==
On 31 May 1998, member Geri Halliwell announced her departure from the Spice Girls. Through her solicitor, she stated, "Sadly I would like to confirm that I have left the Spice Girls. This is because of differences between us. I'm sure the group will continue to be successful and I wish them all the best." Halliwell claimed that she was suffering from exhaustion and wanted to take a break. She would later express, via several media outlets—as well as in her autobiography If Only—that she had been invited to speak at a breast cancer awareness event (Halliwell had a benign breast tumor removed at age 19) but was concerned the other Spice Girls wouldn’t approve, as this was during their European tour and just prior to their North American tour. Her departure from the group made news headlines around the world and became one of the biggest entertainment news stories of the year. The four remaining members were adamant that the group would carry on.

In July 1998, during the American leg of their Spiceworld Tour, the group decided to rework "Goodbye", which had been written when Halliwell was still part of the group. For this, songwriters and music producers Richard Stannard and Matt Rowe flew to Nashville, Tennessee, to meet the group. Recording footage was shown in the Channel 4 documentary Spice Girls in America: A Tour Story. During the documentary, Mel B is filmed recording vocals for the song before abruptly removing her headphones and walking out of the studio. She is later interviewed, saying that the recording process for the song had been difficult, and that “…it is about Geri.” Additionally, in an interview two months later in September 1998, she clarified whether or not the song signified the group's split, saying:

"That was the first time I've cried listening to one of our songs, the first time I instantly cried. It's got a full orchestra on there and it just sounds fantastic. [The song] is really obviously about what's happened during the year, with Geri leaving and then being strong. [...] The song is called 'Goodbye', but it's not goodbye-goodbye, cause the chorus actually is 'goodbye my friend, it's not the end'. So for all those people thinks we're breaking up, we're not. So correct that".

In the Spice Girls' 1999 autobiography, Forever Spice, group member Melanie C said, "'Goodbye' was originally about a relationship ending, but now it's about Geri and it's really sad". Stannard elaborated, saying, "It was about moving on and saying ‘goodbye’ to the old Spice Girls. It wasn't ‘Goodbye’ to Geri; it wasn't really literal. A lot of that song was written when they were touring in America. We wrote it in Nashville so I think it has that sentimental feel to it because everyone was kind of homesick and knackered". Halliwell later declared that she found it "very flattering that they dedicated it to me."

== Release ==
"Goodbye" was released in the United Kingdom on 14 December 1998 as a CD and cassette single. In the United States, the single was serviced to rhythmic contemporary and contemporary hit radio on 24 November 1998, and a maxi-CD was issued on 8 December 1998. The maxi-CD contains a cover of the Waitresses' 1981 single "Christmas Wrapping", as well as live versions of "Sisters Are Doin' It for Themselves" and "We Are Family" that were recorded at Wembley Stadium on 20 September 1998. "Christmas Wrapping" features vocals only from Melanie Chisholm and Emma Bunton due to the pregnancies of Melanie Brown and Victoria Beckham. The American release also included a set of four stickers of the girls, portraying them as fairies, similar to their appearance in the music video of "Viva Forever".

== Composition ==
According to the sheet music published at Musicnotes.com by BMG Rights Management, "Goodbye" is set in common time with a key of E major. The girls' vocals range between G_{3} to C_{5}. The song has a slow tempo of 68 beats per minute. The song is a ballad which has the girls singing what Sarah Davis at Dotmusic called a "sugar-coated" farewell to friend Geri Halliwell, who left the group months prior. Coming to a similar conclusion, Kristie Rohwedder with Bustle noted that in the chorus of the song, the Spice Girls sing "Goodbye my friend/I know you're gone, you said you're gone, but I can still feel you here" and "It's not the end/You gotta keep it strong before the pain turns into fear".

Davis also remarked that, as with their previous two end-of-year songs, "2 Become 1" and "Too Much", "Goodbye" is another ballad in which "the girls take turns at the lead with a chance to come together" on the chorus. Chuck Taylor of Billboard agreed that it "follows in the spirit of Too Much". Metro's Joe O'Brien called its sound "wintry". Fraser McAlpine from BBC America noted that the song "captures that feeling of a tribute paid to a lost loved one".

== Critical reception ==
"Goodbye" was met with positive reception by music critics. Quentin Harrison from Albumism described it as "a touching ode to beginnings and endings inspired by Horner. As 1998 closed, the triumph of that single in the United Kingdom and abroad was proof positive that the power of the Spice Girls had not been diminished by Horner’s exit." Stephen Thomas Erlewine from AllMusic commented that the song was "actually a pretty good finale". Fraser McAlpine from BBC America said that "this is the song they wrote after Geri left, and is also, coincidentally, the last decent thing they ever did as a group". Tania Kraines from BBC Music said "the heartbroken post-Geri 'Goodbye' provided the girls with their last really good single".

Chuck Taylor from Billboard called the song's melody "absolutely beautiful, in fact, one of the group's most memorable, with well-rounded harmonies". Another editor, Jason Lipshutz ranked it as the seventh of "The Top 8 Spice Girls Songs" list, based on the songs' performances on the Hot 100 chart, whilst also stating that "the pangs of sorrow resulting in the realization that the Spice Girls' pop reign had effectively ended makes "Goodbye" a bittersweet hit". During his review of the 2007 compilation Greatest Hits, Nick Levine of Digital Spy said, "Best of all is 'Goodbye', the supremely elegant ballad that became a post-Halliwell Christmas number one". Sarah Davis from Dotmusic website commented that the "feelgood" chorus was "strong enough for this otherwise unremarkable song to be lifted above ordinariness".

Alexis Petridis, a journalist from The Guardian, ranked "Goodbye" 16th on their list "All 43 Spice Girls songs ranked", stating that "calling your comeback single Goodbye was pretty daft – it suggests you have already thrown in the towel – but it was a decent enough song". British music magazine NME said "Goodbye" was a fine song in any age. A review of Sputnikmusic considered the song "very tasteful and emotionally sweeping". Whitney Matheson of USA Today, whilst reviewing their last studio album Forever, wondered, "who the heck ends their album with an old chart-topper? Is this — like the repeated mentions of Carnie, Wendy and Chyna — a subliminal message? Are the Spice Girls simply playing a game, or are they perhaps saying goodbye to their fans?".

== Chart performance ==
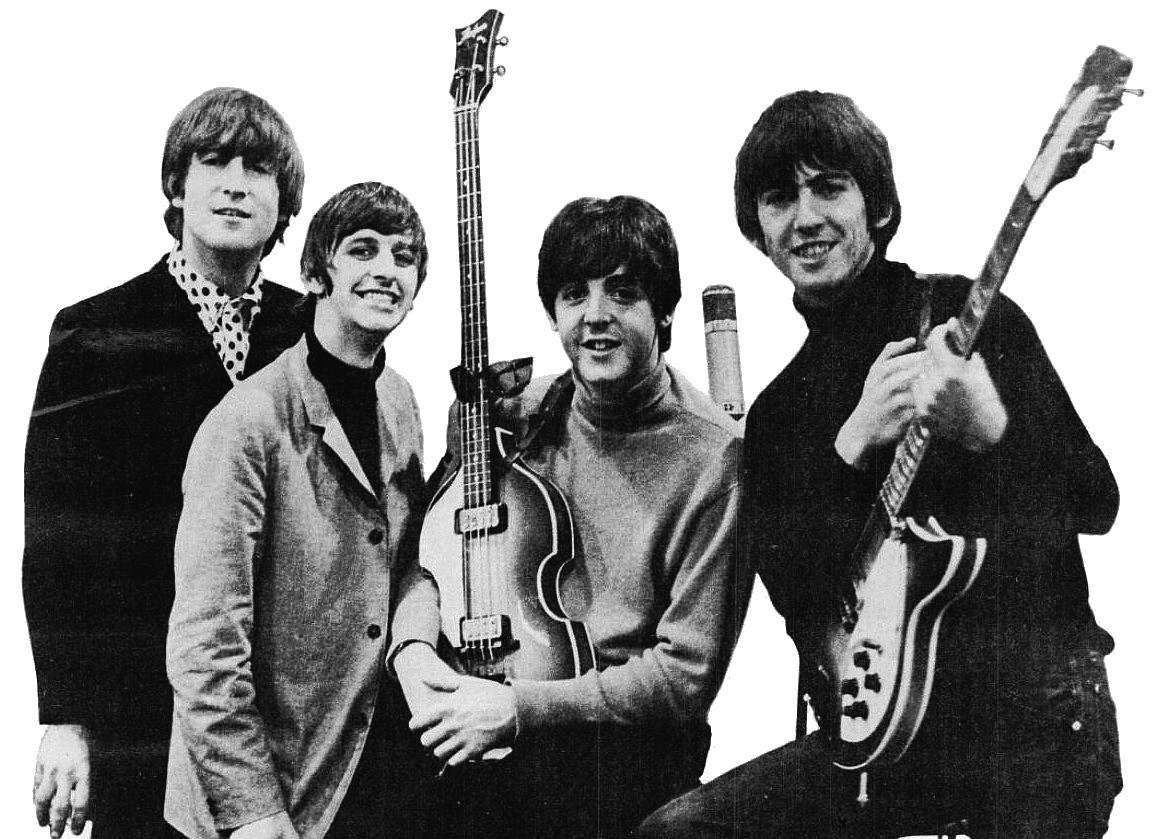
With "Goodbye", the Spice Girls became the first act to have three consecutive Christmas number-one singles since the Beatles in 1965.

On 20 December 1998, "Goodbye" became the Spice Girls' eighth number-one single in the UK, selling 380,000 copies in the first week. With the song, the group became the first act to have three consecutive Christmas number-one singles since the Beatles in 1965. "Goodbye" stayed at number one for one week, remaining inside the chart for twenty-one weeks, and was certified platinum by the British Phonographic Industry (BPI) only four days after it was released, on 18 December 1998. As of December 2020, the song has sold 949,000 copies in the United Kingdom, including 5.6 million streams. "Goodbye" is their second best-selling Christmas single and overall their fifth biggest single in the UK.

Around the world, the song was also successful. In Europe, it reached number two on the Eurochart Hot 100; reached number one in Ireland and Scotland; peaked inside the top ten in Denmark, Finland, Greece, Italy, and Spain; and inside the top twenty in Austria, Belgium (both the Flemish and Walloon charts), and Germany. In Oceania, it debuted on Australia's ARIA Singles Chart at number eight, peaking at number five in its fifth week and staying there for another week. It remained on the chart for sixteen weeks, and was certified gold by the Australian Recording Industry Association (ARIA). In New Zealand, it debuted at the top of the chart, remaining there for the following week and was certified platinum by Recorded Music NZ (RMNZ). It gave the group their third and final number-one single in New Zealand.

In the United States, "Goodbye" debuted at number eleven on the Billboard Hot 100, on the issue dated 26 December 1998. Although it was receiving radio airplay, it was not until its commercial release that it was able to debut on the chart, with 74,000 copies sold. The song was their seventh single to chart, and their best debut since "2 Become 1", which debuted at number six in 1997. "Goodbye" spent three weeks at its peak, eleven weeks on the Hot 100, and was certified gold by the Recording Industry Association of America (RIAA). In Canada, the song reached number fifteen on the RPM 100 Hit Tracks chart, becoming the girls' seventh top 10 hit. Meanwhile, it peaked at number one on the Canadian Singles Chart for 13 consecutive weeks, published by Billboard magazine.

== Music video ==
The group as a quartet, in the music video for "Goodbye".

The accompanying music video for "Goodbye" was filmed at Mentmore Towers in Mentmore, Buckinghamshire on 1 and 2 November 1998, being directed by Howard Greenhalgh, who previously directed their music video for "Too Much" (1997). It was premiered through MTV on 20 November 1998. Brown and Beckham were pregnant during the filming of this video. It opens with each of the girls in four different black cars – 1957 Cadillac Fleetwood 75, 1941 Cadillac Fleetwood 75, 1955 Imperial Newport, Tatra 603 – and white wolves running. They arrive at a castle and walk up the stairs arm-in-arm. When they enter within dry ice clouds, there are frozen couples that the girls observe. The video also shows shots of each girl inside the castle in a different setting with falling objects, namely sheets of paper (Beckham), toilet paper rolls (Bunton), plates (Brown), and an exploding chandelier (Chisholm). They are also seen singing the song together as a group. The video ends with the ice melting off the people as they come back to life, then shows the shot of the girls entering in reverse to look like they are leaving.

== Live performances ==
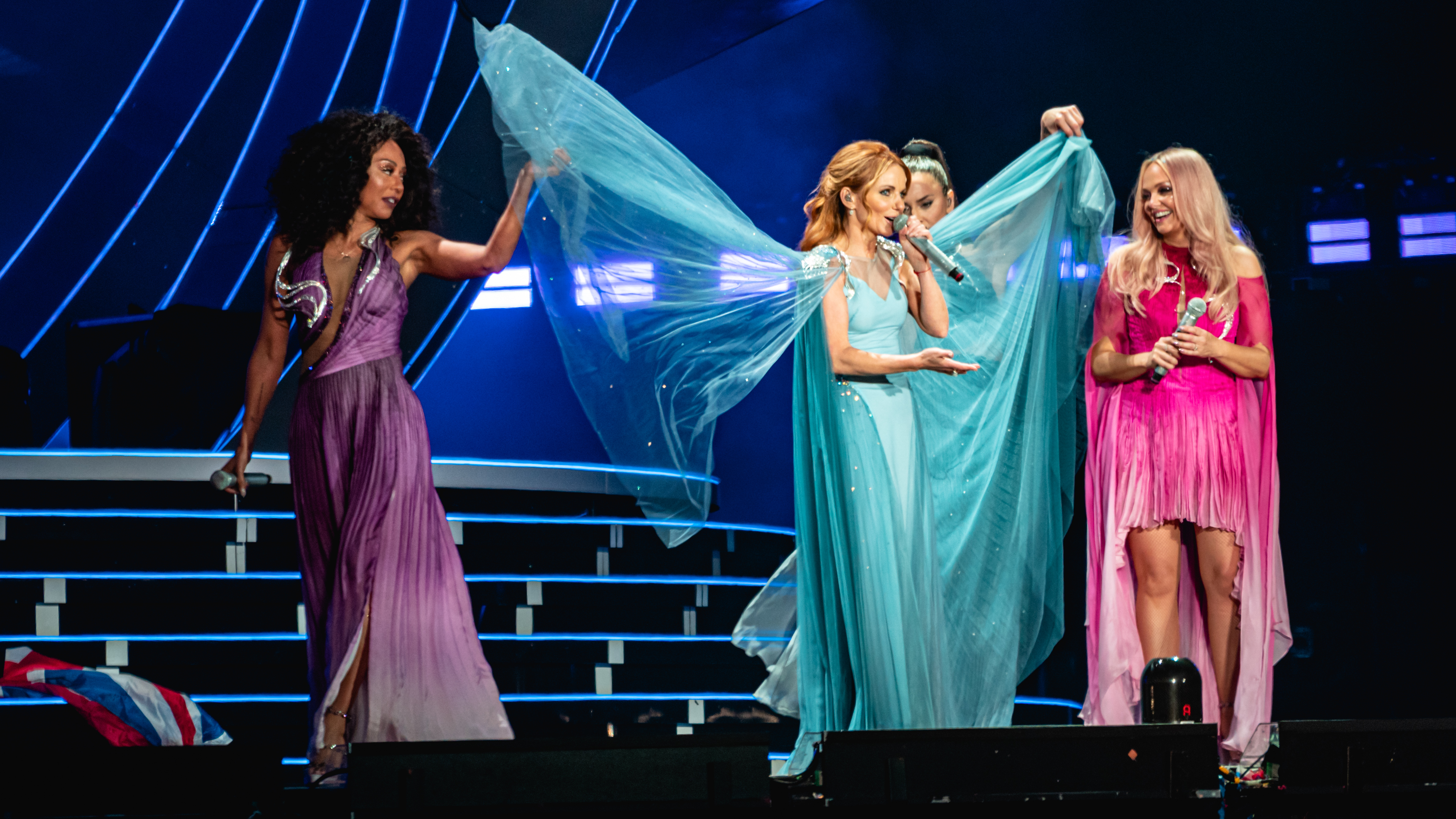
The Spice Girls performing "Goodbye" on the Spice World - 2019 Tour

The first live performance of "Goodbye" was on Channel 5's Pepsi Chart, before the single's commercial release. The group followed with performances of the song on the Royal Variety Performance, where they sang sitting down so that Beckham and Brown did not have to dance. They went on to perform "Goodbye" on Children in Need, The National Lottery Draws, Live & Kicking, CD:UK, and on the Top of the Pops 1998 Christmas special. The song was performed at the 2000 Brit Awards along with "Spice Up Your Life", "Say You'll Be There" and "Holler", which would be released as a single later that year. During the ceremony, the Spice Girls received an award for Outstanding Contribution to Music.

The Spice Girls have performed the song on three of their tours, the Christmas in Spiceworld Tour, the Return of the Spice Girls Tour, and the Spice World – 2019 Tour. "Goodbye" was first included on the setlist of the Christmas in Spiceworld Tour, which had stops in London and Manchester in December 1999. In 2007 and 2008, the song was performed on The Return of the Spice Girls Tour, with Geri Halliwell singing the harmony with the rest of the girls. It was the first song recorded without her vocals that she participated in. It was also performed on the Spice World - 2019 Tour with Beckham's parts being sung by Halliwell. It was on the 2019 tour that Halliwell also performed “Holler”, another song that was recorded without her vocals, with the rest of the group. She sang Beckham’s part during that song. During the tour's last show in London's Wembley Stadium, Halliwell publicly apologised for quitting the band before performing the song.

== Formats and track listings ==
These are the formats and track listings of major single releases of "Goodbye".

- UK CD 1
1. "Goodbye" (radio edit) – 4:20
2. "Christmas Wrapping" – 4:14
3. "Goodbye" (orchestral mix) – 4:14
- UK CD 2
1. "Goodbye" (album version) – 4:35
2. "Sisters Are Doin' It for Themselves" (live) – 4:22
3. "We Are Family" (live) – 3:35
- US and Canadian CD single
1. "Goodbye" (album version) – 4:35
2. "Christmas Wrapping" – 4:14
3. "Sisters Are Doin' It for Themselves" (live) – 4:35
4. "We Are Family" (live) – 3:22
- Asian CD; Thai EP
1. "Goodbye" (Album Version) – 4:35
2. "Christmas Wrapping" – 4:14
3. "Sisters Are Doin' It for Themselves" (Live) – 4:22
4. "We Are Family" (Live) – 3:35
5. "Goodbye" (Orchestral Mix) – 4:14
6. "Goodbye" (Music Video - Enhanced Interactive Element) – 4:34

== Credits and personnel ==
Credits are adapted from the Forever album liner notes.

- Spice Girls – lyrics, vocals
- Richard Stannard – lyrics, production
- Matt Rowe – lyrics, production
- Adrian Bushby – record engineering
- Jake Davies – assistance
- Wil Malone – string arrangement
- Paul Waller – drum programming
- Mark "Spike" Stent – audio mixing
- Paul "P.Dub" Walton – assistant
- Jan Kybert – assistant

== Charts ==
=== Weekly charts ===
Weekly chart performance for "Goodbye"
Chart (1998–1999)	Peak position
Australia (ARIA)	3
Austria (Ö3 Austria Top 40)	13
Belgium (Ultratop 50 Flanders)	14
Belgium (Ultratop 50 Wallonia)	12
Canada (Nielsen SoundScan)	1
Canada Top Singles (RPM)	15
Canada Adult Contemporary (RPM)	10
Canada Dance/Urban (RPM)	22
Denmark (IFPI)	5
El Salvador (Notimex)	2
Eurochart Hot 100 (Music & Media)	2
Finland (Suomen virallinen lista)	2
France (SNEP)	21
Germany (GfK)	17
Greece (IFPI)	7
Hungary (MAHASZ)	2
Iceland (Íslenski Listinn Topp 40)	21
Ireland (IRMA)	1
Italy (FIMI)	1
Italy Airplay (Music & Media)	4
Malaysia (RIM)	5
Netherlands (Dutch Top 40)	4
Netherlands (Single Top 100)	5
New Zealand (Recorded Music NZ)	1
Norway (VG-lista)	6
Scottish Singles Sales (Official Charts)	1
Spain (AFYVE)	8
Sweden (Sverigetopplistan)	2
Switzerland (Schweizer Hitparade)	8
Taiwan (IFPI)	3
UK Singles (Official Charts)	1
UK Airplay (Music Week)	1
US Billboard Hot 100	11

=== Year-end charts ===
1998 year-end chart performance for "Goodbye"
Chart (1998)	Position
Australia (ARIA)	99
Sweden (Hitlistan)	29
UK Singles (OCC)	8

1999 year-end chart performance for "Goodbye"
Chart (1999)	Position
Australia (ARIA)	45
Brazil (Crowley)	35
Canada Top Singles (RPM)	96
Canada Adult Contemporary (RPM)	75
Eurochart Hot 100 (Music & Media)	41
Netherlands (Dutch Top 40)	107
Netherlands (Single Top 100)	64
UK Singles (OCC)	121

=== Decade-end charts ===
Decade-end chart performance for "Goodbye"
Chart (1990–1999)	Position
Canada (Nielsen SoundScan)	3

== Certifications ==
Certifications and sales for "Goodbye"
Region	Certification	Certified units/sales
Australia (ARIA)	Platinum	70,000^{^}
Canada (Music Canada)	2× Platinum	200,000^{^}
New Zealand (RMNZ)	Platinum	10,000^{*}
Sweden (GLF)	Gold	15,000^{^}
United Kingdom (BPI)	Platinum	949,000
United States (RIAA)	Gold	600,000
^{*} Sales figures based on certification alone.^{^} Shipments figures based on certification alone.

== Release history ==
Release dates and formats for "Goodbye"
Region	Date	Format(s)	Label(s)	Ref(s).
United States	24 November 1998	Contemporary hit radio; rhythmic contemporary radio	Virgin	
Germany	7 December 1998	Maxi CD	EMI	
Canada	8 December 1998	Maxi CD	EMI	
France	8 December 1998	CD; maxi CD	EMI	
United States	8 December 1998	Cassette; maxi CD	Virgin	
United Kingdom	14 December 1998	Cassette; two maxi CDs	Virgin	
Japan	23 December 1998	Maxi CD	Toshiba EMI	
