= Let Love Lead the Way =

2000 single by Spice Girls

Single by Spice Girls

from the album Forever
- A-side: "Holler"
- Released: 23 October 2000
- Recorded: 1999
- Genre: R&B
- Length: 4:57
- Label: Virgin
- Songwriters: Victoria Beckham; Melanie Brown; Emma Bunton; Melanie Chisholm; Rodney Jerkins; LaShawn Daniels; Fred Jerkins III; Harvey Mason Jr.
- Producers: Darkchild; Harvey Mason Jr.

Spice Girls singles chronology
| "Goodbye" (1998) | "Holler" / "Let Love Lead the Way" (2000) | "Headlines (Friendship Never Ends)" (2007) |

Music video
- "Let Love Lead the Way" on YouTube

"Let Love Lead the Way" is a song by British girl group Spice Girls, from their third studio album, Forever (2000). It was written by the band members, with additional writing by Rodney "Darkchild" Jerkins, LaShawn Daniels, Fred Jerkins III and Harvey Mason Jr., while production was handled by Darkchild and Mason Jr. The track was released as a double A-side single with "Holler" on 23 October 2000 in the United Kingdom by Virgin Records, and served as the lead single from Forever. "Let Love Lead the Way" is an R&B ballad which lyrically finds the group singing words of encouragement for the future to a girl, which some critics believed was directed to Geri Halliwell, former member of the group. Group member Melanie C described the track's lyrics as being "just about love conquering all".

"Let Love Lead the Way" received mixed reviews from music critics. While some of them complimented the track, others thought the R&B-driven production did not suit the band. The song was a commercial success, peaking at number one on the UK Singles Chart, becoming the group's ninth number-one single in the region, and making them the female group with the most singles to reach the top of the charts. Internationally, it was also commercially successful, peaking inside the top ten in countries such as Denmark, Finland, Ireland, Italy, and Spain.

A music video for "Let Love Lead the Way" was directed by Greg Masuak, and shared the same concept as the video for "Holler", depicting the girls playing one of the four elements each. The song was promoted by the Spice Girls on British televised shows such as The National Lottery Stars, CD:UK, and Top of the Pops during a brief promotional tour for the single, and was later included on two of their concert tours: The Return of the Spice Girls Tour (2007-08) and the Spice World - 2019 Tour (2019).

== Background and release ==
After finishing the Spiceworld Tour in September 1998 and releasing their single "Goodbye" in December, the Spice Girls went into a hiatus period, during which the members of the group launched their solo careers and focused on their personal lives. The group resumed work on their third studio album, Forever, in August 1999. They recruited American recording producers such as Rodney "Darkchild" Jerkins and Jimmy Jam and Terry Lewis to work on the album; Darkchild was signed up to give the project a "tougher" sound. He stated, "I went out to dinner with a couple of the Spice Girls about a month and a half ago and they told me that they want me to, you know, do some work on their album". At the time, he hoped to give an "urban, danceable" vibe for the project and revealed that it would still have a pop appeal, but the beats would be "a little harder". Darkchild traveled to London to work with the group, and together they wrote three songs in five days, revealing that "everybody I've been playing them for can't believe it's the Spice Girls".

Regarding the sessions, band member Melanie C commented that the record was "a bit more mature, but it's not a mature album, but you know, a little bit more mature than the first two. Still very poppy, quite R&B based... we feel vocally a lot stronger now after the world tour and being a four-piece", adding that the group was "stronger after being apart for a while and we're very happy to have been back in the studio. This strength will show on this new album, which I think is our best yet". She revealed during an interview with Heat magazine in May 2000 that the lead single from Forever would be a ballad titled "Let Love Lead the Way" and would be released in August, and confirmed to BBC Radio 1 in late July that it would be a double A-side with "Holler". The girls wrote on their official website that the decision was made as they "love[d] both just as much as each other and couldn't decide which to release [first]". "Let Love Lead the Way" received its world premiere on Malaysian radio station Hitz on 14 September 2000. The double A-side single was released in the United Kingdom on 23 October 2000 as a CD and cassette single.

== Composition ==
"Let Love Lead the Way"
A 30-second sample of the song, with the group singing over a R&B production.

"Let Love Lead the Way" was written by the group's members Victoria Beckham, Melanie Brown, Emma Bunton and Melanie C, along with Darkchild, LaShawn Daniels, Fred Jerkins III and Harvey Mason Jr., while production was handled by Darkchild and Mason Jr. Darkchild also served as the audio mixer, while Mason Jr. was in charge of the Pro Tools for the track. Brad Gilderman recorded the song while also providing audio mixing, whereas Dave Russell and Ian Robertson served as assistants during its production. "Let Love Lead the Way" was mastered by Bernie Grundman at Bernie Grundman Mastering in Los Angeles, California, along with all other tracks present on Forever.

"Let Love Lead the Way" is an R&B ballad, with J.D. Considine from The Baltimore Sun also describing it as "vaguely Celtic". Considine also noted that when Bunton "sings counterpoint against the other Spices on the second chorus", there was "a hint of soul" in her singing. Lyrically, it finds the group singing words of encouragement for the future to a girl; some critics believed it was directed to former member Geri Halliwell, who departed from the group years prior. Conversely, BBC News noted that the lyrics reveal a maternal side from the group, as they sing "words of wisdom to their babies", as members Beckham and Brown had become mothers. In the chorus, they sing, "Part of me laughs/Part of me cries/Part of me wants to question why [...] Just keep the faith/And let love lead the way". For Billy Sloan and Steve Hendry from the Sunday Mail, "the group want[s] to finally bury the hatchet with Geri" after her departure from the group with the track, while according to Tom Ewing from the e-zine Freaky Trigger, the song deals with "big, airy questions in winsome fashion", with lyrics such as "Why is there joy? Why is there pain? Why is there sunshine and the rain?". Chisholm described the lyrical content of the song as "just about love conquering all, really. Highs and lows, happy times and sad times - it's about life".

== Critical reception ==
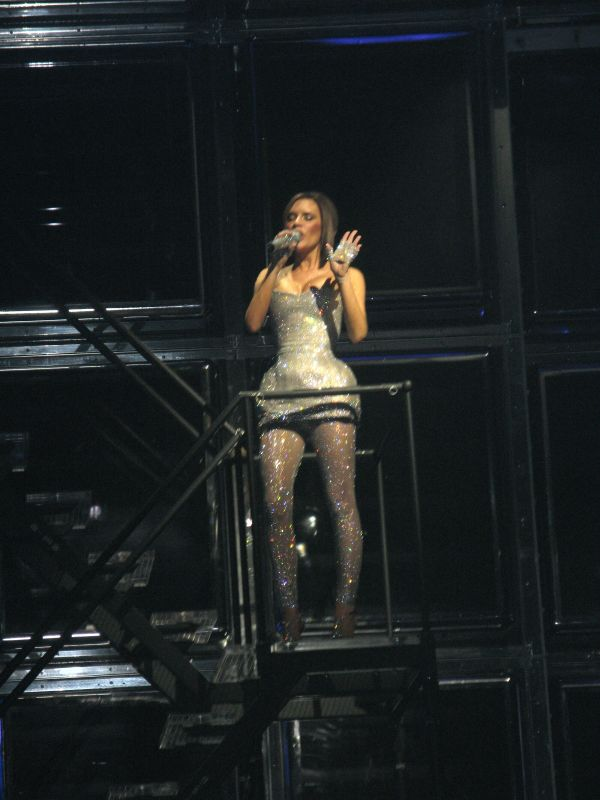
Beckham performing "Let Love Lead the Way" during The Return of the Spice Girls Tour

"Let Love Lead the Way" received mixed reviews from music critics. A reviewer from the Birmingham Evening Mail considered the track a "haunting ballad". Nigel Packer from BBC News said, "as song lyrics go it's not exactly Leonard Cohen, but a definite improvement on 'zig-a-zag-ah'." Worldpop's Tammy Hoyle pointed out that it "sounds even better in the context of the album." On his review for the album, Arion Berger, a journalist of The Washington Post, declared, "On 'Forever', boilerplate girl-group R&B like 'Let Love Lead the Way' doesn't reinvent the genre, but it has a nice sing-along chorus." Lennat Mak of MTV Asia commented that the track "actually stand[s] out better than the up-tempo tracks" on Forever. David Browne of Entertainment Weekly criticised the track, writing that it "could be sung by any urban radio girl group." Similarly, Esther Sadler, a writer for Virgin.net, stated, "The songs on Forever, in particularly Tell me Why, Let Love Lead the Way, Get Down With Me and loads more could be anyone's." According to Jackson Langford from MTV Australia, the song "is let down by its misuse of the group's charm", as "their appeal came from the fact they had complete disregard for the rules wherever they went, and 'Let Love Lead The Way' strips them of that fun entirely."

For Will Stroude from Attitude, while "parts of the Spice Girls’ attempts to embrace R&B-tinged noughties pop trends worked for them", the song "most definitely didn’t. Thank you, next." In a similar vein, Nick Levine of Digital Spy wrote that "Jerkins' slick, stuttering R&B numbers" from Forever failed to capitalise on the group's "very British sense of mischief." Writing for the same publication, Lewis Corner opined that "Let Love Lead the Way" was "nice enough, but isn't packed with the Spice personality their early material conquered the world with." Whitney Matheson of USA Today criticised the lyrics and wrote that "I've heard catchier jingles on feminine product commercials, although I must admit I'm impressed with the deeply imaginative third-person perspective". The Guardian's Alexis Petridis opined that "this is not a bad ballad in polished, Heart FM-friendly style, but there is nothing spectacular about it". Peter Robinson of British music magazine NME commented that the group had "chosen a deeply unfashionable R&B; sound" for the track. According to Cyd Jaymes from Dotmusic, "Holler" and "Let Love Lead The Way" were the best songs on Forever "by a country mile", but they still did not "deserve to be singles". From the same publication, Jenny North said, "Sadly, 'Let Love Lead The Way' doesn't take up where '2 Become 1' or 'Goodbye' (ballads that didn't bore) left off. It sounds like something Celine Dion would have rejected on the grounds that it was 'too soppy'."

== Commercial performance ==
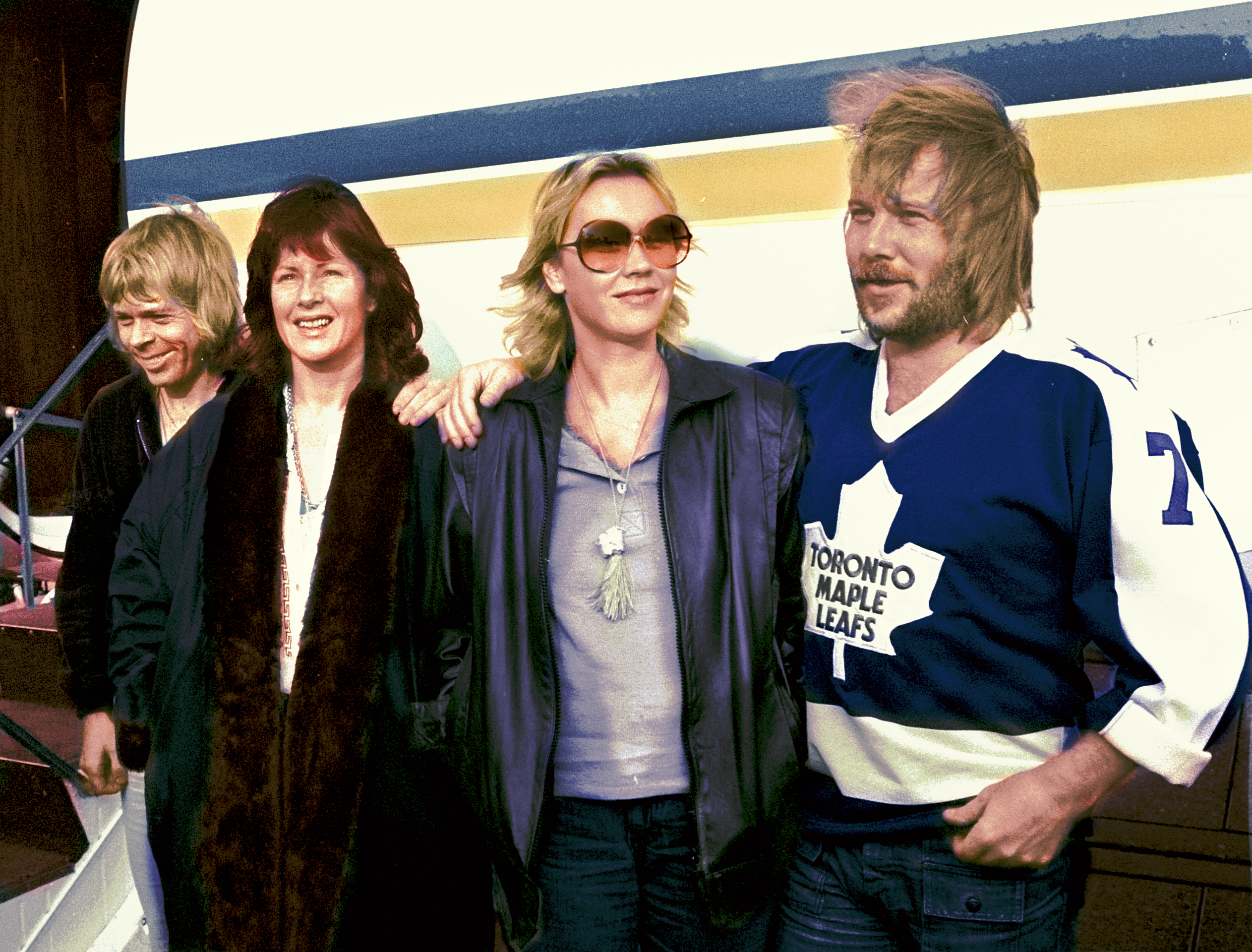
In the UK, "Let Love Lead the Way" placed the Spice Girls in a tie with ABBA (pictured) as the group with the most singles to reach the top of the charts

In the UK, early sales figures reported that "Holler"/"Let Love Lead the Way" was set to debut at number one. It sold 31,000 copies during its first day on sale. On 29 October 2000, the release debuted at the top of the UK Singles Chart, having sold 106,000 copies during its first week. With this feat, the Spice Girls became the first female group to have nine number-one singles, sharing this record with Swedish group ABBA. They were placed only behind The Beatles, Elvis Presley, Cliff Richard and Madonna overall. The song also became Melanie C's 11th number-one single as a songwriter in the region, making her the female artist with more number ones than any other in chart history at the time. She remains the only female performer to top the charts as a solo artist, as part of a duo, quartet and quintet in the UK. The single stayed at number one for one week, remaining inside the chart for 21 weeks, and was certified silver by the British Phonographic Industry (BPI) only four days after it was released, on 27 October 2000. As of May 2019, it has sold 287,000 copies in the country, becoming their 10th best selling single there.

Around the world, "Holler"/"Let Love Lead the Way" was also successful. In Europe, it reached number two on the Eurochart Hot 100; and peaked inside the top ten in countries such as Denmark, Finland, Ireland, Italy, and Spain; and inside the top twenty in Belgium's Walloon region, Germany and the Netherlands. In Oceania, the release entered at its peak of number two on Australia's ARIA Charts, staying there for another week, and becoming their highest charting-single in the country since "Viva Forever" (1998). It remained on the chart for 15 weeks, and was certified platinum by the Australian Recording Industry Association (ARIA). In New Zealand, "Holler"/"Let Love Lead the Way" debuted at number 47 on the charts, remaining for another week at the position. The following weeks, it rose to its peak of number two, becoming the band's 10th consecutive top-10 single, and was certified gold by Recorded Music NZ (RMNZ). "Let Love Lead the Way" was released separately from "Holler" in Canada; it debuted at number five on the Canadian Singles Chart, whereas "Holler" peaked at number two the same week.

== Music video ==
The group representing one of the four elements each in the music video for "Let Love Lead the Way"

The music video for "Let Love Lead the Way" was filmed in two days during July of 2000, and was directed by Greg Masuak, who had previously directed the video for the Spice Girls' "Who Do You Think You Are" (1997). Beckham stated that the video was easier to be filmed when compared to that of "Holler", which was filmed around the same time. Before its release, Chisholm revealed that the girls would play one of the four elements each – water, air, fire and earth – in both videos: "We liked the theme ‘coz [sic] we’re all so different and we all come together and make the Spice Girls and the elements come together to make the earth."

In the video, Bunton appears representing earth and wearing a green dress. She is shown reclining in a forest, underneath a large tree. Brown portrays the element air, dressed entirely in white and dancing in a white room with the canvas walls billowing outwards as if being blown by the wind, while white feathers continuously fall from the sky. Beckham is wearing a dark red dress, representing fire. She is slowly dancing in a barren desert at night, with bursts of fire flaring up behind her. Chisholm plays the part of water, dressed in predominantly blue clothes. She is standing on a blue platform as water cascades from the ceiling to the floor.

Throughout the verses of the song, the girls sing in their own areas, before coming together in one of the rooms for the chorus. Towards the end of the song, each of the elements begin to mix, such as water falling down in the fiery desert and wind blowing through the forest. The four girls are then seen singing together in the desert where all the elements are present plus a shower of sparks behind the girls. The song finishes with a slow-motion shot of each of the girls in their own areas, and then a final shot of each of them together in the white room.

== Live performances ==
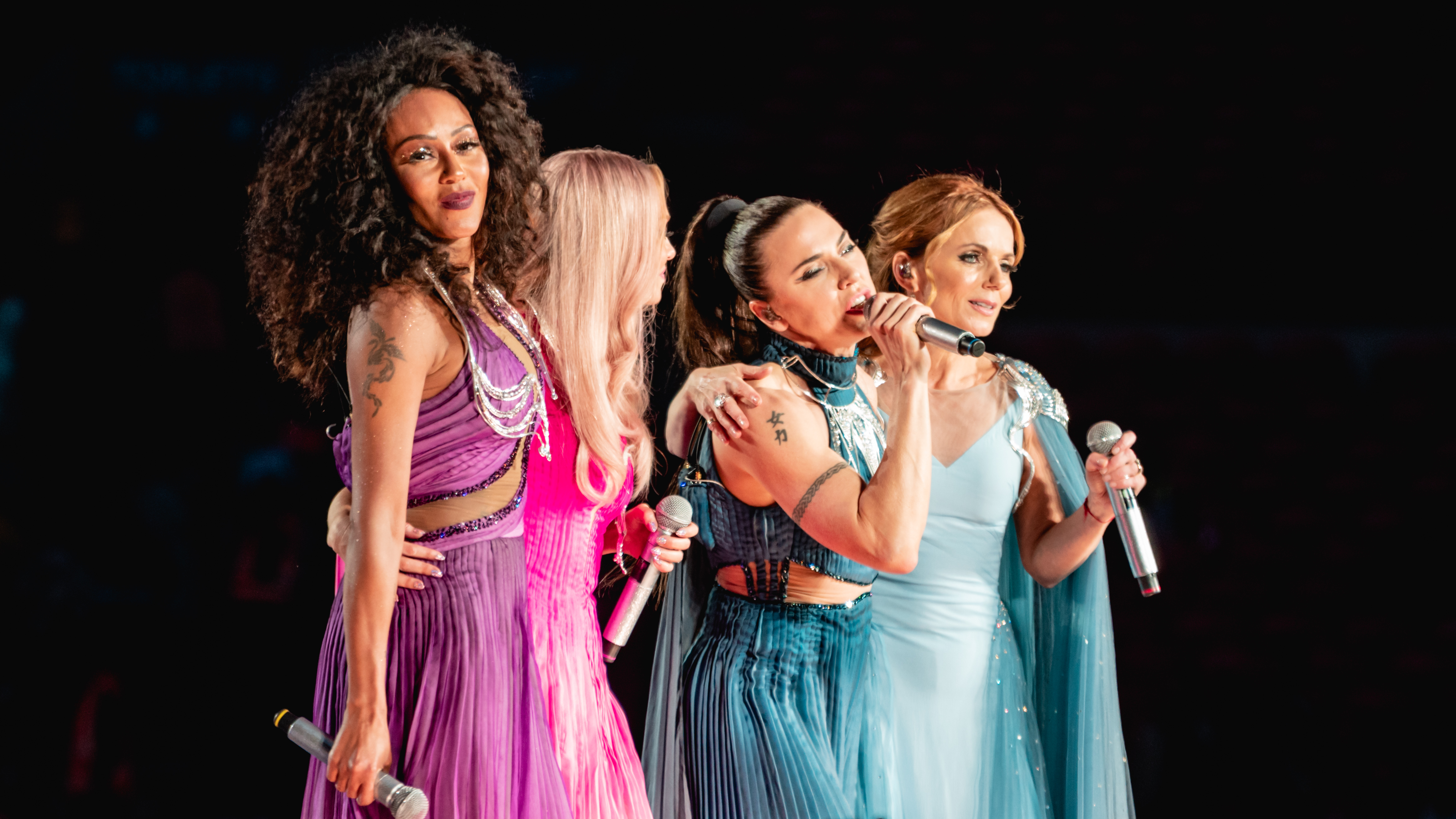
The Spice Girls performing the song on the Spice World - 2019 Tour

Upon its release in 2000, the Spice Girls performed "Let Love Lead the Way" on British televised shows such as The National Lottery Stars, CD:UK, and Top of the Pops, as well as on the latter's Christmas special. The group have also performed the song on two of their concert tours. On the 2007-08 Return of the Spice Girls Tour, they sang the track without Halliwell, although she had returned to the group by this point. Writing for the Vancouver Sun, Amy O'Brien opined that "there was clearly a void in the group's dynamic" with Halliwell's absence.

It was also included on the setlist for their Spice World - 2019 Tour (2019), with the group wearing flowing dresses as they "glided around on stage and sang their parts". Simon Duke of Evening Chronicle noted that putting "Let Love Lead the Way" and other ballads "Viva Forever" and "Goodbye" in quick succession was a "real trump card on the group's part as voices were raised and phones held aloft". David Sinclair, writing for The Spectator, commented that the performance was "surprisingly affecting amid the clamour and glamour that was the show’s default setting." Melanie C later revealed that she found hard and challenging singing the song on the tour, as her voice range was higher at the time of its release, although she loved performing it.

== Track listings ==
- UK CD 1, European and Australian Maxi CD 1
1. "Holler" (radio edit) – 3:55
2. "Let Love Lead the Way" (radio edit) – 4:15
3. "Holler" (MAW Remix) – 8:30
- UK CD 2, European and Australian Maxi CD 2
1. "Let Love Lead the Way" (radio edit) – 4:15
2. "Holler" (radio edit) – 3:55
3. "Holler" (MAW Tribal Vocal) – 7:10
4. "Let Love Lead the Way" (video) – 4:14
5. "Let Love Lead the Way" (behind the scenes) – 7:10
- European and French CD single
1. "Holler" (radio edit) – 3:55
2. "Let Love Lead the Way" (radio edit) – 4:15
- Japanese CD single
1. "Holler" (radio edit) – 3:55
2. "Let Love Lead the Way" (radio edit) – 4:15
3. "Holler" (video) – 4:11
4. "Let Love Lead the Way" (video) – 4:14
- Digital EP
1. "Holler" (radio edit) – 3:55
2. "Let Love Lead the Way" (radio edit) – 4:15
3. "Holler" (MAW Remix) – 8:30
4. "Holler" (MAW Remix Instrumental) - 7:16

== Credits and personnel ==
Credits and personnel adapted from the liner notes of Forever.

- Spice Girls – lyrics, vocals
- Rodney "Darkchild" Jerkins – lyrics, production, music, audio mixing
- LaShawn Daniels – lyrics, vocal production
- Fred Jerkins III – lyrics
- Harvey Mason Jr – lyrics, production, music, Pro Tools
- Brad Gilderman – recorder, audio mixing
- Dave Russell – assistant
- Ian Robertson – assistant

== Charts ==
=== Weekly charts ===
Weekly chart performance for "Let Love Lead the Way"
| Chart (2000–2001) (Note: "Let Love Lead the Way" charted along with "Holler".) | Peak position |
|---|---|
| Australia (ARIA) | 2 |
| Australian Dance (ARIA) | 2 |
| Austria (Ö3 Austria Top 40) | 24 |
| Belgium (Ultratop 50 Flanders) | 35 |
| Belgium (Ultratop 50 Wallonia) | 15 |
| Canada (Nielsen SoundScan) | 5 |
| Denmark (Tracklisten) | 4 |
| Europe (European Hot 100 Singles) | 2 |
| Finland (Suomen virallinen lista) | 6 |
| France (SNEP) | 44 |
| Germany (GfK) | 17 |
| Ireland (IRMA) | 3 |
| Italy (FIMI) | 3 |
| Netherlands (Dutch Top 40) | 15 |
| Netherlands (Single Top 100) | 12 |
| New Zealand (Recorded Music NZ) | 2 |
| Norway (VG-lista) | 4 |
| Scottish Singles Sales (Official Charts) | 1 |
| Spain (AFYVE) | 5 |
| Sweden (Sverigetopplistan) | 8 |
| Switzerland (Schweizer Hitparade) | 15 |
| UK Singles (Official Charts) | 1 |
| UK R&B/Hip Hop | 1 |

=== Year-end charts ===
2000 year-end chart performance for "Let Love Lead the Way"
| Chart (2000) | Position |
|---|---|
| Australia (ARIA) | 61 |
| Ireland (IRMA) | 78 |
| UK Singles (OCC) | 57 |

2001 year-end chart performance for "Let Love Lead the Way"
| Chart (2001) | Position |
|---|---|
| Canada (Nielsen SoundScan) | 175 |

== Certifications ==
Certifications and sales for "Let Love Lead the Way"
| Region | Certification | Certified units/sales |
|---|---|---|
| Australia (ARIA) | Platinum | 70,000^{^} |
| New Zealand (RMNZ) | Gold | 5,000^{*} |
| United Kingdom (BPI) | Silver | 287,000 |
^{*} Sales figures based on certification alone.^{^} Shipments figures based on certification alone.

== Release history ==
Release dates and formats for "Let Love Lead the Way" (Note: On physical formats, "Let Love Lead the Way" was released as a double A-side single with "Holler".)
| Region | Date | Format(s) | Label(s) | Ref. |
|---|---|---|---|---|
| United Kingdom | 23 October 2000 | Cassette; maxi CD | Virgin | |
| France | 24 October 2000 | Maxi CD | EMI | |
| Japan | 22 November 2000 | Maxi CD | Toshiba EMI | |
| France | 28 November 2000 | CD | EMI | |
