= Holler (Spice Girls song) =

2000 single by Spice Girls

Single by Spice Girls

from the album Forever
- A-side: "Let Love Lead the Way"
- Released: 23 October 2000
- Recorded: September 1999
- Studio: Sarm Hook End and Whitfield Street Studios (London)
- Genre: R&B; dance
- Length: 4:15 (album version); 3:55 (radio edit)
- Label: Virgin
- Songwriters: Victoria Beckham; Melanie Brown; Emma Bunton; Melanie Chisholm; Rodney Jerkins; LaShawn Daniels; Fred Jerkins III
- Producer: Darkchild

Spice Girls singles chronology
"Goodbye" (1998)	"Holler" / "Let Love Lead the Way" (2000)	"Headlines (Friendship Never Ends)" (2007)

Music video
- "Holler" on YouTube

"Holler" is a song by British girl group Spice Girls, from their third studio album, Forever (2000). It was written by the group, with additional writing by Rodney "Darkchild" Jerkins, LaShawn Daniels and Fred Jerkins III, with Darkchild also serving as the producer. The track was released on 23 October 2000 in the United Kingdom by Virgin Records as the lead single from Forever, as a double A-side single with "Let Love Lead the Way"; the group had previously premiered the song on their official website on 11 September. "Holler" is an R&B and dance song, depicting a departure from the group's past bubblegum pop works. Lyrically, it consists of the members singing "come-ons" to a male.

"Holler" received mixed reviews from music critics; while some complimented the song's production and the Spice Girls' vocals, others found it too similar to works by Destiny's Child, Sister Sledge and TLC and thought it was too different from the group's previous sounds. The song was a commercial success, topping the UK Singles Chart and becoming the band's ninth number-one single in the region. This gave the Spice Girls the record for being the girl group with the most number-one singles. Internationally, it was also commercially successful, peaking inside the top ten in countries such as Canada, Denmark, Finland, Ireland, and Spain. In the United States, it did not reach the Billboard Hot 100, but managed to reach number 12 on the Bubbling Under Hot 100 Singles chart.

The music video for "Holler" was directed by Jake Nava, and filmed around the same time as the video for "Let Love Lead the Way". It depicted the girls playing one of the four elements each, with them also appearing together inside a glass pyramid. The song was promoted by the Spice Girls with performances on British televised shows such as SMTV Live, CD:UK, and Top of the Pops, as well as on the 2000 MTV Europe Music Awards in Stockholm, Sweden. "Holler" was performed on three of their concert tours, Christmas in Spiceworld Tour (1999), The Return of the Spice Girls Tour (2007–08) and the Spice World - 2019 Tour (2019).

== Background and release ==
After finishing the Spiceworld Tour in September 1998 and releasing their single "Goodbye" in December, the Spice Girls went into a hiatus period, during which the members of the group focused on their personal lives. The group resumed work on their third studio album, Forever, in August 1999. They recruited American recording producers such as Rodney Jerkins and Jimmy Jam and Terry Lewis to work on the album; the former was signed up to give the project a "tougher" sound. He stated that he hoped to bring an "urban, danceable" feel to the project, with "a little harder" beats, while still maintaining a pop appeal. Darkchild traveled to London to work with the group, and together they wrote three songs in five days; the producer also revealed that although he knew he had scheduled recording sessions with them 10 months beforehand, he did not write anything before meeting the girls in London. He also revealed that "everybody I've been playing them for can't believe it's the Spice Girls".

The girls embarked on the brief Christmas in Spiceworld Tour in December 1999, where they debuted three new tracks recorded for Forever, "Right Back at Ya", "W.O.M.A.N." and "Holler", known at the time as "Holler Holler". In May 2000, member Melanie Chisholm told Heat magazine that the lead single from Forever would be a ballad titled "Let Love Lead the Way" and would be released in August; however, months later, a representative for the group stated that the first single had not been chosen yet. Finally, in late July, Chisholm confirmed to BBC Radio 1 that the lead single would be a double A-side of "Let Love Lead the Way" and "Holler", with the latter being available for streaming through the band's official website on 11 September. The girls wrote on their official website that the decision was made because they "love[d] both just as much as each other and couldn't decide which to release [first]". The single was released in the United Kingdom on 23 October 2000 as a CD and cassette single. "Holler" was later sent to US contemporary hit radio on 24 October 2000.

== Composition ==
"Holler"
A 24-second audio sample of "Holler", depicting a more mature R&B sound, different than the group's previous work.

"Holler" was recorded in September 1999 at Sarm Hook End and Whitfield Street Studios in London, United Kingdom by Brad Gilderman, who also provided audio mixing for the track. It was written by the members of the group along with Rodney "Darkchild" Jerkins, LaShawn Daniels and Fred Jerkins III. Production was handled by Darkchild, while vocal production was done by LaShawn Daniels. Mason Jr. was in charge of the Pro Tools for the track, whereas Dave Russell and Ian Robertson served as assistants during its production. "Holler" was mixed at Larrabee North Studios in Los Angeles, California, by Gilderman and Darkchild, while being mastered by Bernie Grundman at Bernie Grundman Mastering, along with all other tracks present on Forever.

Musically, "Holler" is an R&B and dance song, representing a shift from the previous bubblegum pop works from the group, transitioning into a more mature and sexier sound. Quentin Harrison from Albumism also noted a "contemporaneous electronic sheen" into its composition. The track also contains vocoder effects on the vocals. It starts with Darkchild's voice announcing, "Spice Girls, Darkchild, 2000"; he became the first male vocalist to be featured on a Spice Girls track. During the song, the members sing "come-ons" to a male, with lyrics such as "Let me take you into my fantasy room" and "I wanna make you holler, and hear you scream my name". At one point, Chisholm sings "I want to make you do things you thought you'd never do". Luke Abrahams for the London Evening Standard commented on the lyrical content, "Geri [Halliwell] was gone, and so was all the subtlety." According to Billboard's Chuck Taylor, "each of the girls is given the chance to shine" on the song. Emma Bunton commented on "Holler"'s production:

"[I]t's a real dance track that everyone can groove to. Then, as soon as you hear our voices and our melodies, you can tell straight away that it's the Spice Girls, and that is what we wanted to achieve. We wanted to make it funkier, and we're all grown up [...] But we still wanted it to have a Spice-y feel, and I think it's definitely worked out well."

== Critical reception ==
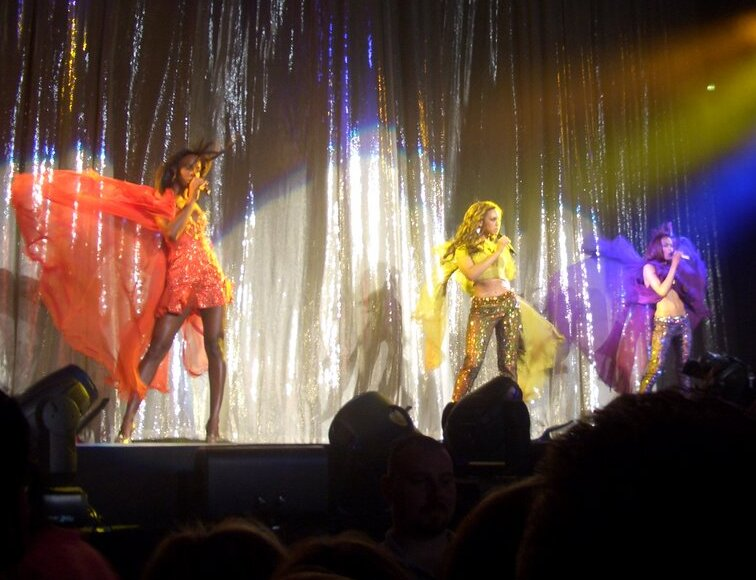
"Holler" was compared to works by Destiny's Child (pictured in 2005)

Upon its release, "Holler" received mixed reviews from music critics. Taylor highlighted the quality and confidence of the members' vocals, as well as the "bold, saucy attitude evident here that's more convincing than in the past." He also complimented the "swift, clever, kicky" production. Craig Seymour of Entertainment Weekly gave the track a B− rating, writing that the girls "sound like they really, really wanna be Destiny's Child" on the song. Seymour also praised "its charms", praising the "easy yet funky groove, their exaggerated British accents", as well as Darkchild's "familiar slapping, kinetic beats". He also called it "their most compelling reason to dance" since their single "Say You'll Be There" (1996). Stephen Thomas Erlewine of AllMusic simply picked the song as one of the best from Forever. According to Jackson Langford from MTV Australia, "Holler" was "easily the biggest surprise the Spice Girls ever managed to pull off", but it "feels so far apart from what fans are used to", although being "at least somewhat enjoyable". Similarly, Julia Jafaar from the New Straits Times wrote, "Those who have heard the hit single, Holler, from the new album, would probably attest that the music arrangement and style" were atypical of the group and its previous hits.

Jenny North from Dotmusic considered the track "slick, fun, as catchy as crabs and the girls are sounding sexier than ever before", predicting it would "lodge itself in your head with the rest of their back catalogue" after a few listens. Writing for the same website, Cyd Jaymes wrote that "Holler" and "Let Love Lead The Way" were the best songs on Forever "by a country mile", but they still did not "deserve to be singles". Whitney Matheson of USA Today called it similar to the works of Sister Sledge, Destiny's Child and Nu Shooz songs, writing that, "while the No Scrubs-y vibe briefly tempted me to shout a dirty word and bare my navel, styrofoam phrases such as 'Don't be afraid to play my game' are more Teletubby than T-Boz." Arion Berger of The Washington Post compared the track to "catching your little sister making out with some guy at the mall". In a review for the album, the Lincoln Journal Star staff considered that "attempts at uptempo, funky sounds" such as "Holler" "fall flat almost instantly".

Retrospective reviews for the single have also been mixed. Will Stroude of Attitude considered the track "funky, attitude-filled", but acknowledged that retrospective reviews of the song "haven’t always been kind, but they make the mistake of defining the era based on the cultural craze that had come before, rather than taking it on its own terms", but asserted that "connoisseurs know that ‘Holler’ still slaps almost two decades later." While reviewing their Greatest Hits album, Nick Levine of Digital Spy stated that "Jerkins' slick, stuttering R&B numbers" from Forever, which included "Holler", failed to capitalise on the group's "very British sense of mischief". According to The Guardian's Alexis Petridis, Jerkins was a "great signing" as producer, although his "more avant tendencies" were "hemmed in by the necessity of making Spice Girls records with direct pop appeal"; hence, he described "Holler" as "serviceable, rather than thrilling". Dom Passantino of Stylus Magazine rated the single 3/10, saying the song is his "personal pick for the worst production job in musical history, ol' Darkchild took the most unique, epoch-defining, cultural maelstrom of a group he could find, and turned them into a facsimile of Fanmail-era TLC." Tom Ewing of e-zine Freaky Trigger said the song "shifts and shuffles in a competent, modish way", but criticized the group and the producer for "not trying to change any games". He also described the intro as sounding dated: "Like 'Holler' needed to sound any more 2000."

== Chart performance ==
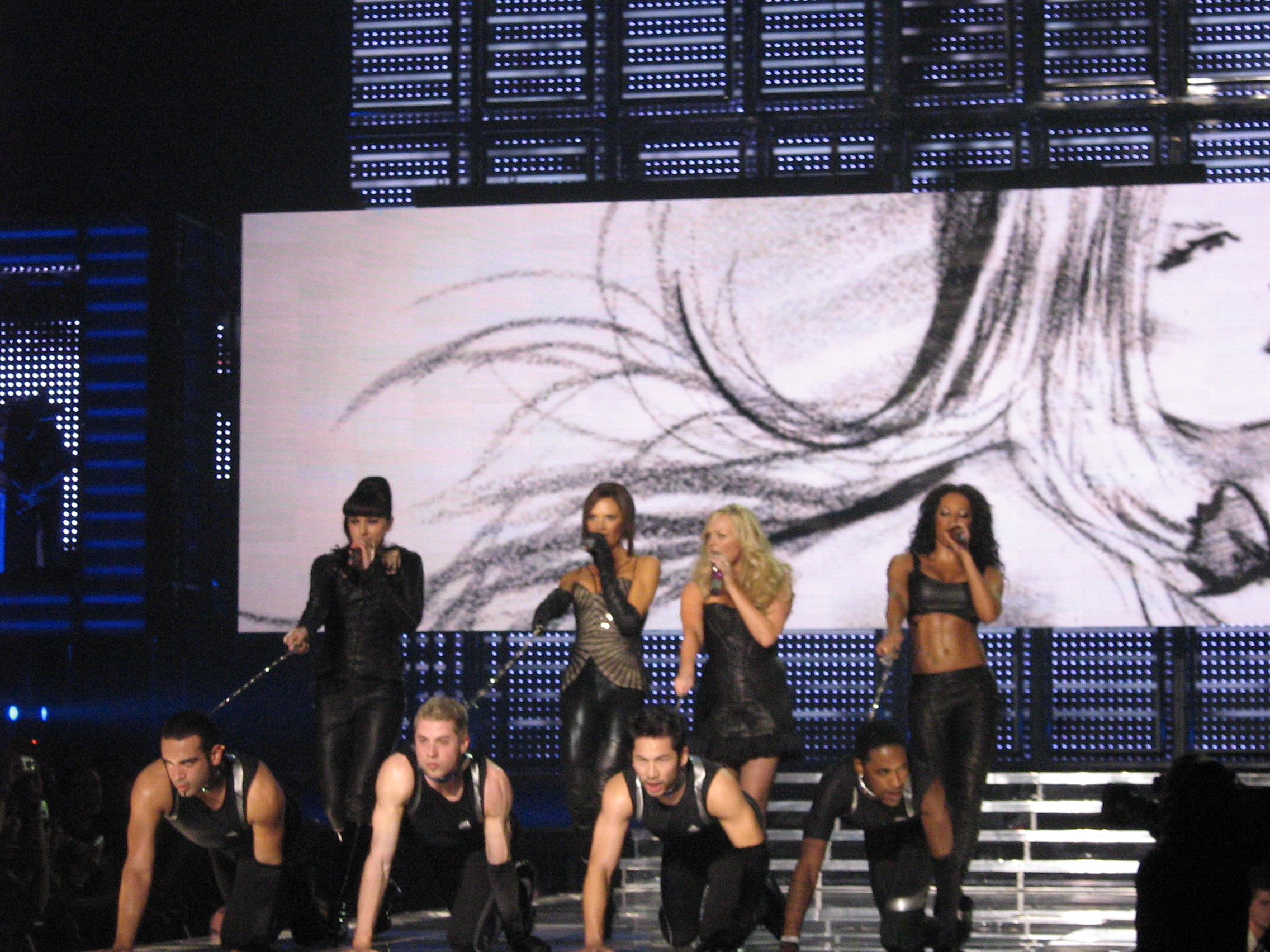
The Spice Girls performing "Holler" during the Return of the Spice Girls Tour; the song became the group's ninth number-one single in the United Kingdom

On 24 October 2000, early sales figures reported that "Holler"/"Let Love Lead the Way" was set to debut at number one on the UK Singles Chart, selling 31,000 copies during the first day on sale. On 29 October 2000, the song debuted at the top of the charts, selling 106,000 copies on its first week. With this feat, the Spice Girls became the first female group to have nine number-one singles, sharing the same amount with ABBA. They were placed only behind The Beatles, Elvis Presley, Cliff Richard and Madonna overall. The song also became Chisholm's 11th number-one single as a songwriter in the region, making her the female artist with more number ones than any other in chart history at the time. She remains the only female performer to top the charts as a solo artist, as part of a duo, quartet and quintet. The single stayed at number one for one week, remaining inside the chart for 21 weeks, and was certified silver by the British Phonographic Industry (BPI) only four days after it was released, on 27 October 2000. As of May 2019, it has sold 287,000 copies in the United Kingdom, becoming their 10th biggest selling single in the region.

Around the world, "Holler"/"Let Love Lead the Way" was also successful. In Europe, it reached number two on the Eurochart Hot 100; and reached number one in Scotland; peaked inside the top ten in countries such as Denmark, Finland, Ireland, Italy, and Spain; and inside the top twenty in Belgium's Walloon region, Germany and the Netherlands. In Oceania, the release entered at its peak of number two on Australia's ARIA Charts, staying there for another week, becoming their highest charting-single in the country since "Viva Forever" (1998). It remained on the chart for 15 weeks, and was certified platinum by the Australian Recording Industry Association (ARIA). In New Zealand, "Holler"/"Let Love Lead the Way" debuted at number 47 on the charts, remaining for another week at the position. The following weeks, it rose to its peak of number two, becoming the band's 10th consecutive top-10 single, and was certified gold by Recorded Music NZ (RMNZ).

"Holler" was released separately from "Let Love Lead the Way" in Canada. It debuted at number two on the chart compiled by Nielsen Soundscan, only behind the Backstreet Boys' "Shape of My Heart", whereas "Let Love Lead the Way" peaked at number five the same week. On the RPM magazine's chart, the song managed to reach number 12, until publication was ceased in November 2000. In the United States, the track peaked at number 12 on the Bubbling Under Hot 100 Singles chart, an extension of the Billboard Hot 100 chart. "Holler" additionally reached numbers 31 and 40 on the Dance Club Songs and Rhythmic charts, compiled by Billboard.

== Music video ==
The Spice Girls inside a glass pyramid in the music video for "Holler"

The music video for "Holler" was filmed at the Elstree Studios in Borehamwood, England, during July 2000, and was directed by Jake Nava. It was filmed around the same time as the music video for "Let Love Lead the Way". Before its release, Chisholm revealed that the girls would play one of the four elements each – water, air, fire and earth – in both videos: "We liked the theme coz' we’re all so different and we all come together and make the Spice Girls and the elements come together to make the earth." For her part, Brown described the visual as "very, very futuristic and it's very funky. We had a great time doing it." The clip first premiered through the Spice Girls' official website on 11 September 2000, before airing on television for the first time through MuchMusic the following day.

The video begins zooming into a seemingly glass pyramid where the four girls are dancing on a square platform in a circle. Melanie Brown represents fire as she sits in a dark room with fire rolling along the floor. Chisholm is seen levitating above cracked mud inside a room with wooden walls as the floor blooms into plant life, representing earth. Bunton wears a short blue dress with a white coat, while dancing in a blue room under water with reflections bouncing off the walls. Finally, Victoria Beckham, who embodies the element of air, is seen inside a wind tunnel playing with shiny prisms as they are blown by. All the girls are then seen together in the pyramid watching their respective male dancers – who are seen in each of their solo shots – dancing on the square platform. At the end of the video, the group embrace in a hug.

Rockol website commented that "the four put aside striped trousers and improbable outfits with preposterous colors to focus, also in this case, on black and above all on sexy winks and at least naughty necklines." According to Mark Elliott from Yahoo! Music, it "suggests much of what might have proved a fascinating new musical direction if the band hadn’t taken a lengthy break after the album’s release." Niellah Arboine of Bustle noted that "it all feels a bit more grown. Mel B’s gone blonde, Emma’s not in pink, and can we take a moment to appreciate Victoria Beckham with long hair in a white jumpsuit and sunglasses getting Matrix-style blown around in a wind tunnel?". John Dingwall from the Daily Record compared the video to works by Robbie Williams and Kylie Minogue, as the group "squeezed into leather and looking mean and moody". The clip received the "Worst Video" prize at the 2000 Smash Hits Poll Winners Party. It was ripped off in the music video for Nawal El Zoghbi's song "Elli Tmaneito" (2002), which was called "a total copycat" of "Holler".

== Live performances ==
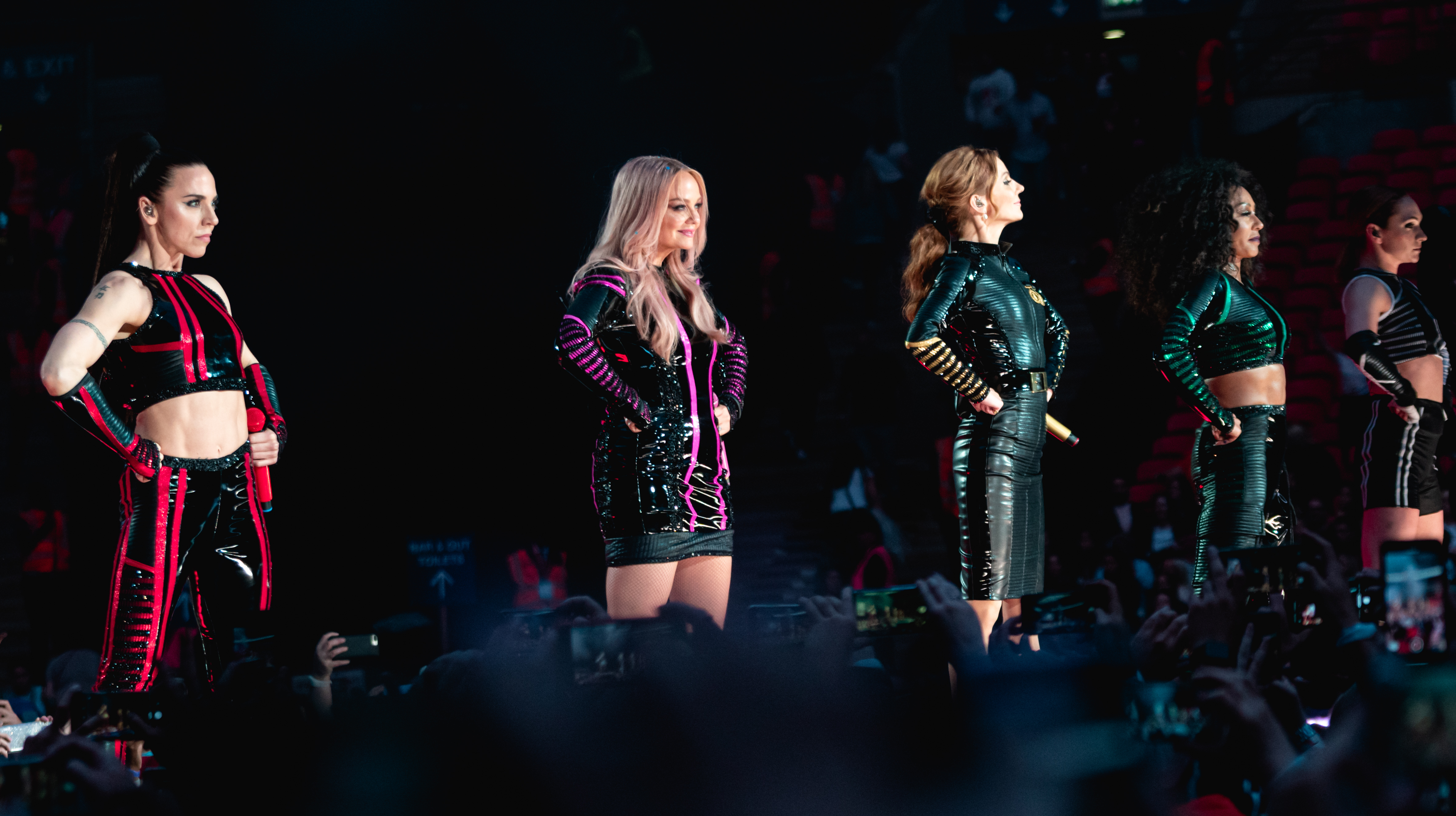
The Spice Girls during the performance of "Holler" on the Spice World - 2019 Tour

The group first performed "Holler" on their Christmas in Spiceworld tour in December 1999, as one of the songs to be included on their then-upcoming third studio album. The song was later performed at the 2000 Brit Awards and was excluded from the TV broadcast due to technical problems arising during the performance but the song was heard on the live radio broadcast. During the ceremony, the Spice Girls received an award for Outstanding Contribution to Music. In order to promote Forever, the group performed it on British televised shows such as SMTV Live, Top of the Pops and CD:UK. They also performed the track at the 2000 MTV Europe Music Awards on 16 November 2000 in Stockholm, Sweden; before the performance, Chisholm declared that it could be their last appearance together before going on a hiatus to focus on their solo careers. For the number, the group wore leather outfits, ending with them going through the floor with large orange pyrotechnic flames blazing up.

The Spice Girls performed the song on their first reunion tour, The Return of the Spice Girls Tour in 2007 and 2008. They were dressed in dominatrix leather outfits, and had their dancers on leashes, on their knees. Jon Pareles from The New York Times considered the performance the "raciest stage moment" of the show, while according to Chicago Tribune's Alison Bonaguro, the number "took things too far with the Spice Girls dressed in black leather and the dancers in collars and leashes." Though Halliwell had returned to the group at this point, she did not take part in the performance. For their second reunion tour, the Spice World - 2019 Tour, "Holler" was performed with elements of "Sound Off"; it also marked the first time Halliwell performed the song live with the group. Holly Williams from The Independent reacted negatively to the number, saying it reminds "why they stopped making music". She also called a "real misstep" when "over a marching band (very budget Beyoncé) they revive their old chant 'we know how we got this far/strength and courage in a Wonderbra'. As a vision of feminism, this maybe – maybe – passed muster in the Nineties, but sounds woefully out of step in 2019".

== Track listings ==
- UK CD 1 / Australian CD 2
1. "Holler" (radio edit) – 3:55
2. "Let Love Lead the Way" (radio edit) – 4:15
3. "Holler" (MAW Remix) – 8:30
4. "Holler" (video) – 4:11
- Japanese CD single
1. "Holler" (radio edit) – 3:55
2. "Let Love Lead the Way" (radio edit) – 4:15
3. "Holler" (Video) – 4:11
4. "Let Love Lead the Way" (Video) – 4:14
5. "Let Love Lead the Way" (4x30 sec Behind the Scenes Clips)
- Digital EP
1. "Holler" (radio edit) – 3:55
2. "Let Love Lead the Way" (radio edit) – 4:15
3. "Holler" (MAW Remix) – 8:30
4. "Holler" (MAW Remix Instrumental) – 8:30
- Digital EP (MAW Remixes)
1. "Holler" (MAW Tribal Vocal) – 7:10
2. "Holler" (MAW Spice Beats) – 3:12
3. "Holler" (MAW Dub) – 6:46
4. "Holler" (MAW Tribal Instrumental) – 7:15
- European CD single
1. "Holler" (radio edit) – 3:55
2. "Let Love Lead the Way" (radio edit) – 4:15
- UK 12-inch single

A1. "Holler" (MAW Remix) – 8:30
A2. "Holler" (MAW Spice Beats) – 3:12
B1. "Holler" (MAW Tribal Vocal) – 7:10
B2. "Holler" (MAW Dub) – 6:46
C1. "Holler" (MAW Remix Instrumental) – 8:30
C2. "Holler" (MAW Tribal Instrumental) – 7:15

== Credits and personnel ==
- Spice Girls – lyrics, vocals
- David Adams - Backing vocals
- Rodney "Darkchild" Jerkins – lyrics, production, audio mixing
- LaShawn Daniels – lyrics, vocal production
- Fred Jerkins III – lyrics
- Harvey Mason Jr – Pro Tools
- Brad Gilderman – recorder, audio mixing
- Dave Russell – assistant
- Ian Robertson – assistant

Published by Rodney Jerkins Productions, EMI Music Publishing Ltd., Fred Jerkins Music Publishing, Famous Music Corp and EMI Music Publishing (WP) Ltd.

== Charts ==
=== Weekly charts ===
Weekly chart performance for "Holler"
Chart (2000–2001)	Peak position
Australia (ARIA)	2
Australian Dance (ARIA)	2
Austria (Ö3 Austria Top 40)	24
Belgium (Ultratop 50 Flanders)	35
Belgium (Ultratop 50 Wallonia)	15
Canada Top Singles (RPM)	12 (Note: "Holler" reached number 12 when RPM ceased publication in November 2000.)
Canada (Nielsen SoundScan)	2
Croatia International Airplay (HRT)	1
Denmark (Tracklisten)	4
El Salvador (El Siglo de Torreón)	6
Europe (European Hot 100 Singles)	2
Finland (Suomen virallinen lista)	6
France (SNEP)	44
Germany (GfK)	17
Greece (IFPI)	5
Iceland (Íslenski Listinn Topp 20)	4
Ireland (IRMA)	3
Italy (FIMI)	3
Latvia (Latvijas Top 30)	18
Netherlands (Dutch Top 40)	15
Netherlands (Single Top 100)	12
New Zealand (Recorded Music NZ)	2
Norway (VG-lista)	4
Poland (Polish Singles Chart)	1
Portugal (AFP)	3
Romania (Romanian Top 100)	4
Scottish Singles Sales (Official Charts)	1
Spain (AFYVE)	5
Sweden (Sverigetopplistan)	8
Switzerland (Schweizer Hitparade)	15
UK Singles (Official Charts)	1
UK Airplay (Music Week)	2
UK Hip Hop/R&B (Official Charts)	1
US Bubbling Under Hot 100 (Billboard)	12
US Dance Club Songs (Billboard)	31
US Rhythmic Airplay (Billboard)	40

=== Year-end charts ===
2000 year-end chart performance for "Holler"
Chart (2000)	Position
Australia (ARIA)	61
Brazil (Crowley)	30
Iceland (Íslenski Listinn Topp 40)	79
Ireland (IRMA)	78
Romania (Romanian Top 100)	54
UK Singles (OCC)	57

2001 year-end chart performance for "Holler"
Chart (2001)	Position
Canada (Nielsen SoundScan)	156

== Certifications ==
Certifications and sales for "Holler"
Region	Certification	Certified units/sales
Australia (ARIA)	Platinum	70,000^{^}
New Zealand (RMNZ)	Gold	5,000^{*}
United Kingdom (BPI)	Silver	350,000
^{*} Sales figures based on certification alone.^{^} Shipments figures based on certification alone.

== Release history ==
Release dates and formats for "Holler" (Note: On physical formats, "Holler" was released as a double A-side single with "Let Love Lead the Way".)
Region	Date	Format(s)	Label(s)	Ref.
Various	11 September 2000	Streaming	Virgin	
Germany	23 October 2000	Maxi CD	EMI	
United Kingdom	23 October 2000	Cassette; maxi CD	Virgin	
United States	24 October 2000	Contemporary hit radio	Virgin	
Japan	22 November 2000	Maxi CD	Toshiba EMI	
France	28 November 2000	CD	EMI	
