= The Return of the Spice Girls Tour =

2007–08 concert tour by the Spice Girls

- Tour by Spice Girls
- Location: North America • Europe
- Associated album: Greatest Hits
- Start date: 2 December 2007
- End date: 26 February 2008
- Legs: 2
- No. of shows: 47
- Attendance: 581,066 (45 shows)
- Box office: $70.1 million (45 shows)

Spice Girls concert chronology
- Christmas in Spiceworld Tour (1999); The Return of the Spice Girls Tour (2007–2008); Spice World – 2019 Tour (2019)

The Return of the Spice Girls Tour was the third concert tour by English girl group the Spice Girls, running from December 2007 to February 2008. It was the group's first tour since Christmas in Spiceworld (1999), a small British Christmas-season tour, and their only full tour with all five members, as Geri Halliwell had left the group before the North American portion of the Spiceworld Tour in 1998.

Across 45 shows (out of 47), the tour sold 581,066 tickets, with a box-office gross of $70.1 million, and earned an additional $100 million from merchandising. Overall, the tour was the eighth highest-grossing concert tour of 2008. The seventeen-night sellout residency at London's O_{2} Arena was the highest-grossing engagement of the year, taking in $33.8 million and drawing an audience of 256,647, winning the 2008 Billboard Touring Award for Top Boxscore. This was also the most recent Spice Girls tour to feature Victoria Beckham, as she declined to participate in their subsequent reunion tour due to other commitments.

== Background ==
In June 2007, the Spice Girls held a press conference at the O_{2} Arena in London, formally announcing their intention to reunite as a group, a plan that had long been speculated on by the media. During the press conference, the group laid out their plans to embark on a world concert tour that would be seen as a celebration of the group's history and to tour as a quintet for the last time. Initially, eleven dates were announced, spanning North America, Europe, Asia, Oceania, Africa and South America, and fans were informed that they had to pre-register for tickets on the group's website. On 30 September, the successful applicants for the Los Angeles, Las Vegas, Vancouver and London concerts were informed of how they could purchase their tickets, via email and text alerts, from valid ticket vendors. Demand was so high that many dates quickly sold out and new dates in London were immediately announced after the first date at the O_{2} Arena sold out in only 38 seconds. Sixteen additional dates in London were eventually added, all selling out within one minute.

== Concert synopsis ==
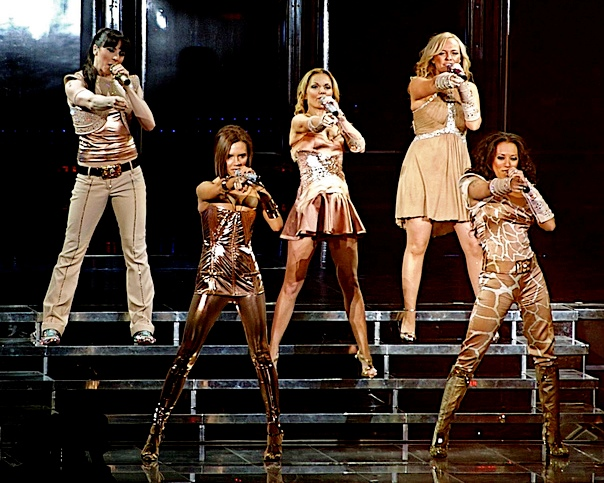
The Spice Girls performing "Spice Up Your Life" as the opening number of their Return of the Spice Girls tour, at the Air Canada Centre, in Toronto; wearing tight metallic coloured outfits designed by Roberto Cavalli.

The show begins with a video introduction of five young girls playing inside a house when they find a magic box. When they open it, fireworks appear, and the five girls all wish to become pop stars when they grow up. An instrumental of "Spice Up Your Life" begins as various music videos and press headlines about the Spice Girls are shown. As the video ends, the Spice Girls enter the stage on five platforms and perform "Spice Up Your Life". They then perform a mashup of their 1998 hit "Stop" and "It's Like That" by Jason Nevins and Run-DMC, which famously blocked "Stop" from the number 1 position on the UK Singles Chart. After the girls introduce themselves at the end of the second song, they perform "Say You'll Be There" remixed with "Fix" by Blackstreet. Their reunion single "Headlines (Friendship Never Ends)" is the last song in the first act. The second act begins with a jazz theme for "The Lady Is A Vamp" having a showgirl-style performance. An up-tempo jazz version of "Too Much" is performed with the group dressed in tuxedos, while doing a striptease behind neon pink-coloured, heart-shaped doors. "2 Become 1" is performed next while each of the girls emerge from a cocoon of oversized swan wings and dance around a set of barber's poles while singing the song.

The third act begins with a video of falling money and the titles Baby, Posh, Sporty, Scary and Ginger appear on the screen with their signature themes. Geri Halliwell then enters the stage wearing a sequin Union Jack dress, while Emma Bunton wears a small pink coat, and Melanie C appears wearing a sports track suit. Victoria Beckham then appears wearing a little black lace dress, while Mel B wears her trademark leopard print catsuit, and the group perform "Who Do You Think You Are". The song symbolises the height of the Spice Girls in their heyday. Beckham is then left on stage giving a Catwalk / Runway dance to a remix of "Like a Virgin" by Madonna and "Supermodel (You Better Work)" by RuPaul. Mel B then performs solo, taking a male member of the audience and subsequently chains him to a ladder as she performs a cover of "Are You Gonna Go My Way" by Lenny Kravitz. Bunton gives a 1960s-inspired performance of her 2003 hit "Maybe".

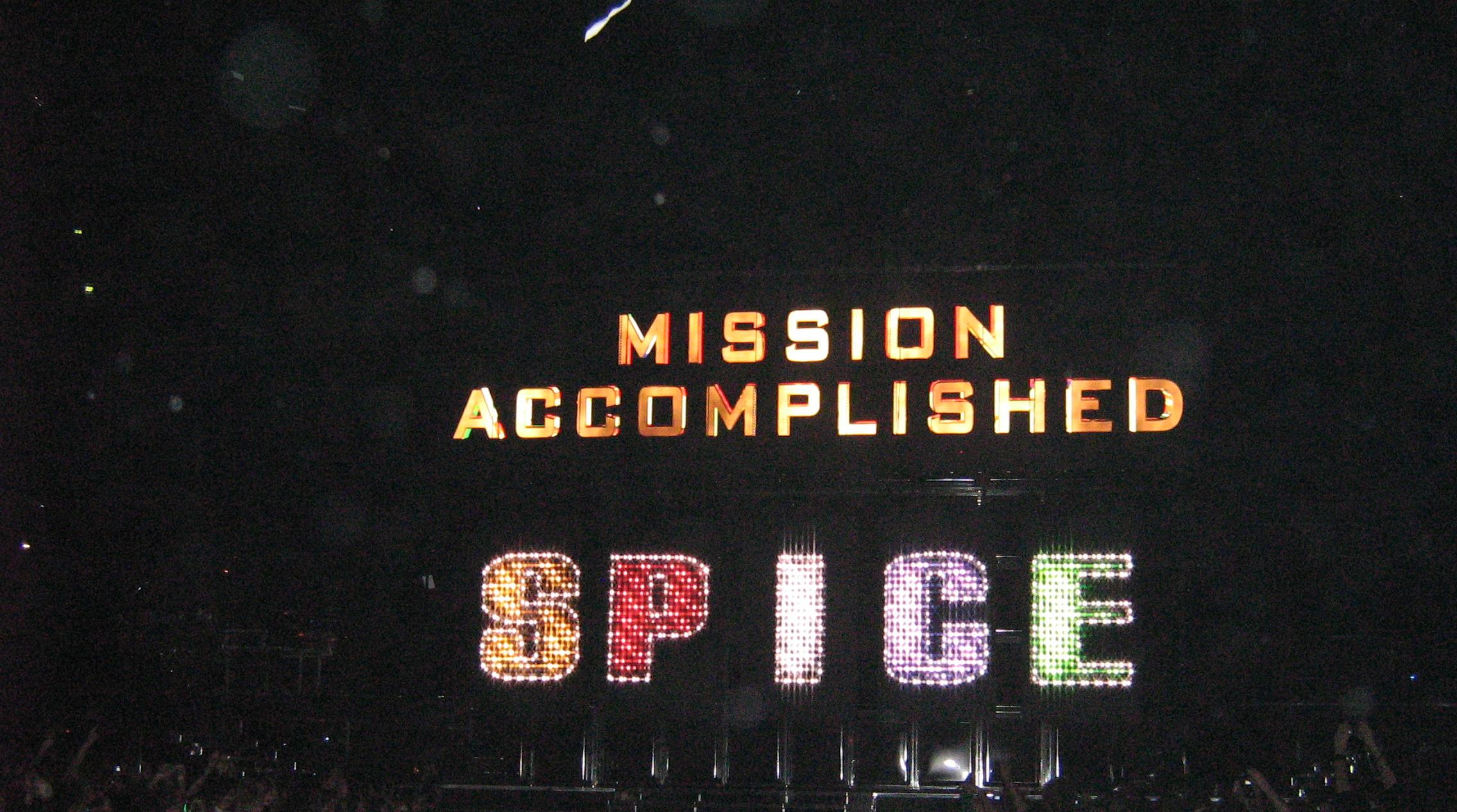
The show ends with the slogan "MISSION ACCOMPLISHED – SPICE"

Following a cape dance interlude, "Viva Forever" is performed with a Latin theme and tango/fan dance break, the song ends with Halliwell exiting the stage early, acknowledging her departure from the band in 1998. "Holler" is then performed by the four remaining members, with a dominatrix theme similar to the video of the song. Halliwell then returns solo to perform her single "It's Raining Men", followed by Melanie C who performs her song, "I Turn to You". Mel B, Melanie C, Bunton, and Beckham then perform "Let Love Lead the Way" dressed in white and silver. Halliwell returns from under the stage at the end of the song. The five girls come together holding hands and walk to the center stage, raising their hands to signify their reunion and bond as a quintet. They then perform "Mama" with personal photographs of themselves with their mothers and children. For the British shows, fifty young girls from the Capital Children's Choir dressed in white came out from a platform and lined the stage against the backdrop screens to sing with the Spice Girls. This was then followed by the "Celebration Medley", a mash-up of "Celebration", "Shake Your Body (Down to the Ground)", "That's The Way (I Like It)", and "We Are Family". The girls then perform "Goodbye".

The encore begins with a "Humpty Dance" interlude by the dancers as it segues into "If U Cant Dance" with the girls wearing a different coloured robe. The girls then take off their robes to reveal glittery outfits: Mel B in gold, Halliwell in blue, Melanie C in red, Beckham in green, and Bunton in pink. They then perform their biggest hit and debut single "Wannabe". Finally they perform a heavily remixed version of "Spice Up Your Life". At the end, a cannon exploded showering the stage with pieces of gold, white and black paper strips, while flags from different countries flashed across the backdrop screens.

== Controversy ==
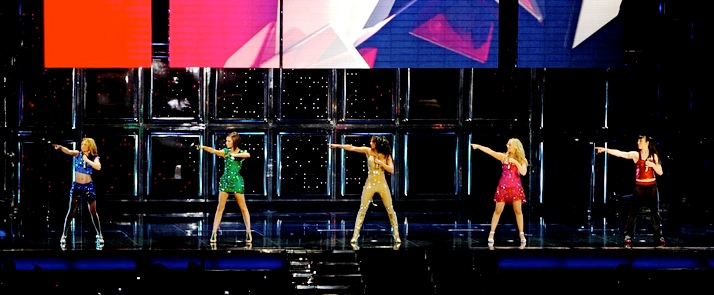
The group performing a remix of "Spice Up Your Life" at the Air Canada Centre, during the encore.

In late 2007, a fake email was posted by blogger Perez Hilton on his site, stating that the Spice Girls had cancelled their Buenos Aires date, prompting an official statement to be released, stating that Buenos Aires and the other world tour dates were "being finalized". However, due to the extending of the British and American legs of the tour, Hilton's claim was ultimately confirmed to be true; on 1 February 2008, the tour was announced as officially ending in Toronto, Ontario, on 26 February 2008. This confirmed that the originally planned shows in Buenos Aires, Cape Town, Hong Kong, Sydney and Tokyo, among other potential locations, were cancelled.

Many media outlets reported that the tour’s shortening was due to Melanie Chisholm and Melanie Brown leaving the group, although this was not the case and was later denied in an official video message. Still, the band suffered international fan backlash, with some creating Facebook hate- and slander-groups, speculating that the official announcement was "indirect" and vague, and that the Spice Girls and their management "knew the dates were cancelled", even before they added 16 dates at London’s O2, and that they strategically decided to announce the change near the end of the tour to "minimize controversy".

In 2026, Mel B revealed in an interview that the abuse within her marriage to Stephen Belafonte was the reason the tour had ended early. "I couldn't hide it anymore" she said. "It was my fault why that tour came to a halt"

== Broadcasts and recordings ==
BBC Radio 2 recorded the shows in London on 15 and 16 December 2007. An hour-long "highlights special" was broadcast on 22 and 31 December 2007 that included eleven of the twenty-two songs performed. It was confirmed on the Spice Girls official website that there would not be a DVD release. The lack of an official DVD released caused negativity. After many e-mails from fans to the management, it was officially announced that no official DVD had been recorded at all. However, Mel B confirmed on her website that footage of the tour was recorded but the quality was poor and they felt it was wrong to release a DVD for local distribution. In 2017, Melanie C clarified in a YouTube interview that although the concerts had recording for the on-stage video-screens and promotional purposes, a DVD was never recorded due to "poor organization". Because the tour sold out quickly, it was impossible to have empty seats and make room for cameramen and extra lighting, making it impossible to film a high-quality DVD.

In May 2020, two previously unseen video-screen recordings in New York and Philadelphia were uploaded online by Ivan "Flipz" Valez, who was one of the dancers.

== Set list ==
The following set list is representative of the Vancouver show on 2 December 2007. It is not representative of all concerts for the duration of the tour.

1. "Spice Up Your Life"
2. "Stop"
3. "Say You'll Be There"
4. "Headlines (Friendship Never Ends)"
5. "The Lady Is a Vamp"
6. "Too Much"
7. "2 Become 1"
8. "Who Do You Think You Are"
9. "Like a Virgin" / "Supermodel (You Better Work)" (Victoria Beckham solo interlude)
10. "Are You Gonna Go My Way" (Mel B solo)
11. "Maybe" (Emma Bunton solo)
12. "Viva Forever"
13. "Holler"
14. "It's Raining Men" (Geri Halliwell solo)
15. "I Turn to You" (Melanie C solo)
16. "Let Love Lead the Way"
17. "Mama"
18. "Celebration" / "Shake Your Body (Down to the Ground)" / "That's the Way (I Like It)" / "We Are Family" (disco mix)
19. "Goodbye"

Encore

20. "If U Can't Dance"
21. "Wannabe"
22. "Spice Up Your Life" (reprise)

== Tour dates ==
List of concerts, showing date, city, country, and venue
Date	City	Country	Venue	Attendance	Revenue
North America
2 December 2007	Vancouver	Canada	General Motors Place	—N/a	—N/a
4 December 2007	San Jose	United States	HP Pavilion	—N/a	—N/a
5 December 2007	Los Angeles	United States	Staples Center	24,502 / 24,502	$2,673,311
7 December 2007	Los Angeles	United States	Staples Center	24,502 / 24,502	$2,673,311
8 December 2007	Las Vegas	United States	Mandalay Bay Events Center	—N/a	—N/a
9 December 2007	Las Vegas	United States	Mandalay Bay Events Center	—N/a	—N/a
11 December 2007	Las Vegas	United States	Mandalay Bay Events Center	—N/a	—N/a
Europe
15 December 2007	London	England	The O_{2} Arena	256,647 / 256,647 (Note: This score data is combined from all shows at The O_{2} Arena, London)	$33,829,250
16 December 2007	London	England	The O_{2} Arena	256,647 / 256,647	$33,829,250
18 December 2007	London	England	The O_{2} Arena	256,647 / 256,647	$33,829,250
20 December 2007	Cologne	Germany	Kölnarena	—N/a	—N/a
23 December 2007	Madrid	Spain	Madrid Arena	—N/a	—N/a
2 January 2008	London	England	The O_{2} Arena	—	—
3 January 2008	London	England	The O_{2} Arena	—	—
4 January 2008	London	England	The O_{2} Arena	—	—
6 January 2008	London	England	The O_{2} Arena	—	—
8 January 2008	London	England	The O_{2} Arena	—	—
9 January 2008	London	England	The O_{2} Arena	—	—
11 January 2008	London	England	The O_{2} Arena	—	—
12 January 2008	London	England	The O_{2} Arena	—	—
13 January 2008	London	England	The O_{2} Arena	—	—
15 January 2008	London	England	The O_{2} Arena	—	—
16 January 2008	London	England	The O_{2} Arena	—	—
18 January 2008	London	England	The O_{2} Arena	—	—
20 January 2008	London	England	The O_{2} Arena	—	—
22 January 2008	London	England	The O_{2} Arena	—	—
23 January 2008	Manchester	England	Manchester Evening News Arena	41,323 / 41,323	$5,388,122
24 January 2008	Manchester	England	Manchester Evening News Arena	41,323 / 41,323	$5,388,122
26 January 2008	Manchester	England	Manchester Evening News Arena	41,323 / 41,323	$5,388,122
North America
30 January 2008	Boston	United States	TD Banknorth Garden	—N/a	—N/a
31 January 2008	Montreal	Canada	Bell Centre	—N/a	—N/a
3 February 2008	Toronto	Canada	Air Canada Centre	58,368 / 58,368 (Note: This score data is combined from all shows at Air Canada Centre, Toronto)	$6,396,302
4 February 2008	Toronto	Canada	Air Canada Centre	58,368 / 58,368	$6,396,302
6 February 2008	Uniondale	United States	Nassau Coliseum	22,622 / 24,207	$2,427,714
7 February 2008	Uniondale	United States	Nassau Coliseum	22,622 / 24,207	$2,427,714
10 February 2008	Newark	United States	Prudential Center	23,430 / 25,143	$2,565,726
11 February 2008	Newark	United States	Prudential Center	23,430 / 25,143	$2,565,726
13 February 2008	East Rutherford	United States	Izod Center	—N/a	—N/a
15 February 2008	Chicago	United States	United Center	—N/a	—N/a
16 February 2008	Auburn Hills	United States	The Palace of Auburn Hills	—N/a	—N/a
18 February 2008	New York City	United States	Madison Square Garden	—N/a	—N/a
19 February 2008	Philadelphia	United States	Wachovia Center	—N/a	—N/a
21 February 2008	Washington, D.C.	United States	Verizon Center	—N/a	—N/a
22 February 2008	Hartford	United States	XL Center	—N/a	—N/a
24 February 2008	Montreal	Canada	Bell Centre	—N/a	—N/a
25 February 2008	Toronto	Canada	Air Canada Centre	—	—
26 February 2008	Toronto	Canada	Air Canada Centre	—	—
Total				581,066 (45 shows)	$70,100,000 (45 shows)

== Cancelled dates ==
List of concerts, showing date, city and country
Date	City	Country
Asia
10 January 2008	Beijing	China
12 January 2008	Hong Kong	
Oceania
17 January 2008	Sydney	Australia
Africa
20 January 2008	Cape Town	South Africa
South America
24 January 2008	Buenos Aires	Argentina

== Personnel ==
=== Vocals ===
- Mel B
- Emma Bunton
- Geri Halliwell
- Victoria Beckham
- Melanie C

=== Band ===
- Simon Ellis – Musical Director / Keyboards
- Paul Gendler – Guitars
- Greg Hatwell – Guitars
- Nick Nasmyth – Keyboards
- Scott Firth – Bass
- Sudha Kheterpal or Thomas Dyani – Percussion
- Vinnie Lammi – Drums

=== Dancers ===
- Gus Carr (Dance Captain)
- Scotty Nguyen (Dance Captain)
- Alex Larson
- Antonio Hudnell
- Cassidy Noblett
- Dougie Styles
- Ivan "Flipz" Valez
- Leo Moctezuma
- Victor Rojas
- Vinh Bui

=== Main crew ===
- Musical Director: Simon Ellis
- Creative Director: Jamie King
- Production & Lighting: LeRoy A. Bennett
- Assistant Director: Carla Kama
- Supervising Choreographer: Stefanie Roos
- Video Director: Dago Gonzalez for Veneno, Inc.
- Costume Design: Roberto Cavalli
- Manager: Simon Fuller
- Executive Producer: Spice Girls and 19
