= Mama (Spice Girls song) =

1997 single by the Spice Girls

Single by Spice Girls

from the album Spice
- A-side: "Who Do You Think You Are"
- B-side: "Baby Come Round"
- Released: 3 March 1997
- Studio: Strongroom (London, England)
- Genre: Pop
- Length: 5:04 (album version); 3:41 (radio version)
- Label: Virgin
- Songwriters: Matt Rowe; Richard Stannard; Spice Girls
- Producers: Matt Rowe; Richard Stannard

Spice Girls singles chronology
| "2 Become 1" (1996) | "Mama" / "Who Do You Think You Are" (1997) | "Spice Up Your Life" (1997) |

Music video
- "Mama" on YouTube

"Mama" is a song by the British girl group the Spice Girls. It was written by the Spice Girls, Matt Rowe and Richard Stannard, and produced by Rowe and Stannard for the group's debut album Spice, released in November 1996. "Mama" is a pop ballad that features instrumentation from keyboards, a rhythm guitar, a cello, and a violin, and its lyrics deal with the difficulties in relationships between mothers and daughters that appear during their childhood.

It was released as a double A-side with "Who Do You Think You Are", and became the official single of the 1997 Comic Relief. Its Big TV! directed music video, featured the group singing to an audience of children and their own mothers. Despite receiving mixed reviews from music critics, "Mama" was commercially successful. Released as the album's fourth single in March 1997, it became their fourth consecutive number-one single in the United Kingdom, which made the Spice Girls the first act in UK chart history to have its first four singles reach number one. It was certified platinum by the British Phonographic Industry (BPI). The single performed well internationally, reaching the top ten in many European countries and New Zealand, and the top fifteen in Australia.

== Writing and inspiration ==
"Mama" was written by the Spice Girls with songwriting partners Matt Rowe and Richard Stannard. In an interview about the writing process between the group and the duo, Rowe credits Mel B as the one who came up with the song's concept. During the writing process, each member wrote a small verse in a different corner of the recording studio, while the chorus was finished around the piano with a guitar. Then, the producers added a gospel choir filled with the group's harmonies at the end of the song. Brown explained the song's inspiration in the book Real Life: Real Spice The Official Story:

We wrote 'Mama' when I was going through a bad phase with my mum. The sentiments are really that your mum's probably the best friend that you've got. Whether she's an over-protective mother or a bit of a landmine, she probably knows you better than yourself in some ways.

In the same book, Melanie C further elaborated: "'Mama's all about how you're such a cow to your mum when you're going through that rebellious teenage stage. Then when you get a bit older, you realise that whatever she was doing, she was only doing it for your own good. And you think: 'God, I was really horrible.'" "Mama" was released in the UK and Ireland as a double A-side along with "Who Do You Think You Are" in March 1997, timed not only for the Comic Relief telethon, but also for Mothering Sunday.

== Composition ==
Mama
A 30-second sample of "Mama", featuring the Spice Girls singing the last part of the song, while a choir arranged by Mark Beswick, supplemented them.

"Mama" is a pop ballad, written in the key of A-flat major, it is set in the time signature of common time and moves at a moderate tempo of 100 beats per minute. The song is constructed in a verse-chorus form, with a bridge before the third chorus, and its instrumentation comes from keyboards, a rhythm guitar, a cello, and a violin.

It opens with an instrumental introduction, with a chord progression of D♭–E♭–Fm–E♭/G–A♭, that is used in the entire song. Bunton and Brown sing the first and second verse respectively. The bridge and third chorus follow. Then a choir, arranged by Mark Beswick, supplements the group during the last part of the song. "Mama" ends with the group repeating the chorus until the song gradually fades out. Lyrically, the song deals with the difficulties in the relationships between mothers and teenagers that appears during the adolescence, and it was dedicated to the group's mothers.

== Reception ==
=== Critical response ===
"Mama" received mixed reviews from music critics. The Daily Mirror criticised the song saying "Yuk! We don't want our Spice Girls sweet, ta very much. They should concentrate on the raunch and let Daniel O'Donnell take care of the mums." Dev Sherlock of Yahoo! Music Radio called it a "glossy ballad that would do Mariah Carey proud". Edna Gundersen of the USA Today said that their album Spice "is assembly-line dance-pop", adding that "only the funky 'Say You'll Be There' and touchingly cornball 'Mama' hint at depth".

In a review of their album Spice, Ken Tucker from Entertainment Weekly called it "a fearlessly corny ballad", and added that it "will likely keep them from being one-hit wonders in America". Melissa Ruggieri of the Richmond Times-Dispatch said that in the song, the girls "are sunny vocalists who harmonize with perfumey sweetness when called upon". Daniel Incognito of Sputnikmusic said that in "Mama" the group "sing with heartfelt emotion", and added that "their somewhat amateurish singing is brought up and pushed along by the production crew, harmonising nicely into a stirring pop hook".

=== Chart performance ===
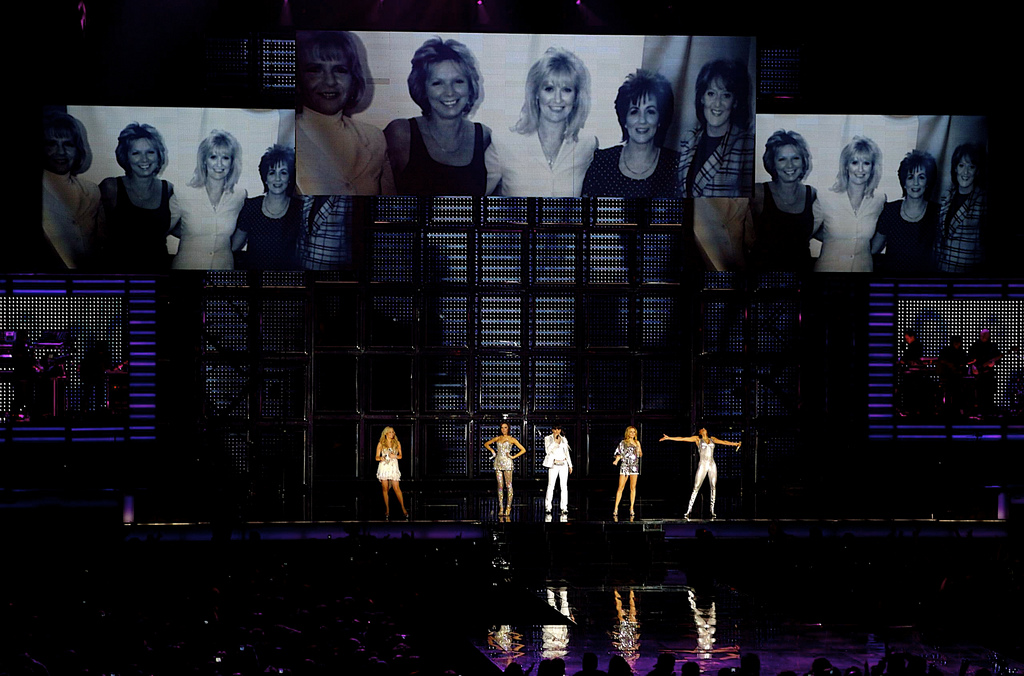
The group performing "Mama" at the Air Canada Centre in Toronto, Canada, during the Return of the Spice Girls tour, with the backdrop screens showing a picture of their mothers.

"Mama" was released in the UK as a double A-side single with "Who Do You Think You Are" on 3 March 1997. It debuted on the UK Singles Chart at number one on Mother's Day, with sales of 248,000 copies, becoming the group's fourth consecutive chart-topper. This achievement made the Spice Girls the first act in UK chart history to have its first four singles reach number one, breaking the record set by Gerry & The Pacemakers, Frankie Goes to Hollywood, Jive Bunny and the Mastermixers, and Robson & Jerome with three number ones each. It spent three weeks at number one, nine weeks in the top forty, fifteen weeks in the top seventy-five, and sold 786,000 copies as of May 2019, earning a platinum certification by the British Phonographic Industry (BPI).

"Mama" was commercially successful in Europe. It peaked at number three on the Eurochart Hot 100, and performed similarly in other European charts. It became the group's third number-one single in Ireland, and peaked inside the top ten in Belgium (both the Flemish and French charts), Germany, the Netherlands, Sweden, and Switzerland. "Mama" was released as a standalone single in Austria and Finland. In Austria, it was released on 23 March 1997, debuting on the Ö3 Austria Top 40 at number thirty-one. It peaked at number one in its ninth week, and remained fifteen weeks on the chart.

In Oceania, its commercial performance was generally positive, though not as overwhelming as their three first singles. In New Zealand, it debuted on 23 March 1997 at number ten, while their three first singles were slowly descending from the chart. It peaked at number six and stayed fifteen weeks on the chart. In Australia, it did not perform as well as their previous releases. On 27 July 1997, it debuted on the singles chart at number thirteen, but was unable to reach a higher position and dropped off the chart after fourteen weeks.

== Music video ==
The group in a studio singing "Mama" to an audience of children.

The music video for "Mama" was filmed on 15 January 1997 by Big TV!, and filmed in a studio in Ealing, London. It features the group singing to an audience of children and their own mothers. The video alternated between this scenes and shots of 10 child actors playing younger versions of the Spice Girls doing various things all together, such as playing and practicing singing and dancing, though none of the group's members grew up together. It also shows each mother of the girls holding a picture of their daughter.

There are two versions of the music video, which are edited slightly differently to one another.

The original video features the crowd chanting "Spice Girls," then Geri and Emma arriving at the stage in a convertible, Victoria and Mel B entering the stage through a set of wooden French doors, and Mel C arriving on the stage by sliding down a rope. It has a young boy directing the show, and has Emma start the singing standing up on stage.

Whereas the re-edited version pans to the girls already sat in a circle on stage, along with a slide show displaying photos of the real band members as children. This version has Emma start the singing sitting down on her stool.

About the shoot, Victoria Beckham commented: "It took such a long time to film the 'Mama' video, but it was nice that our mums were there and could see what we're doing. It's good, because they were actually knackered at the end of the day and I said to my mum: 'Ha! Now you know how I feel every day!" Geri Halliwell commented: "I found it a bit bizarre bringing my mum to work with me on the 'Mama' video. You know: 'This is what I do—come and do it, too.' If you worked in Sainsbury's, you wouldn't get your mum to sit with you on the till".

== Live performances ==
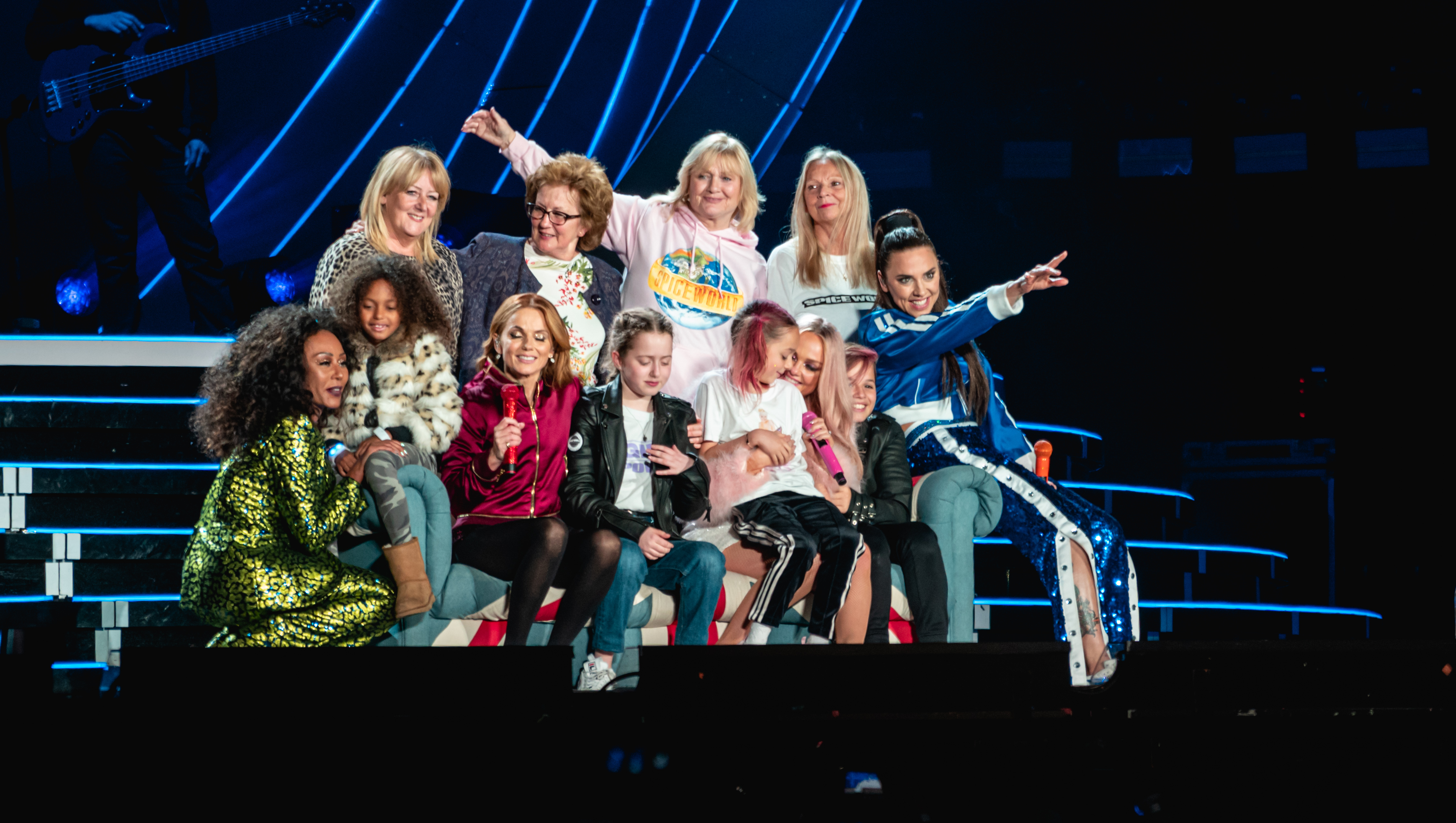
The Spice Girls, accompanied by their mothers and children, performing the song at the final night of their Spice World - 2019 Tour at the Wembley Stadium in London.

The song was performed many times on television, including An Audience with..., Live & Kicking, Top of the Pops, the 1997 Prince's Trust Gala, and the 1997 Comic Relief. In October 1997, the group performed it as the thirteenth song of their first live concert at the Abdi İpekçi Arena in Istanbul, Turkey. The performance was broadcast on Showtime in a pay-per-view event titled Spice Girls In Concert Wild!. However, the VHS and DVD release of the concert, Girl Power! Live in Istanbul, does not include the performance. The song was also used during the climax of their 1997 film, Spice World. In the scene, the group performs "Mama" at London's Royal Albert Hall, surrounded by the media and thousands of fans. The scene was included as a bonus performance in the VHS and DVD release of the movie.

The group have performed the song on their four tours, the Spiceworld Tour, the Christmas In Spiceworld Tour, the Return of the Spice Girls Tour and the Spice World - 2019 Tour. It remained in the group's live set after Halliwell's departure at the end of the European leg of the Spiceworld Tour. The performance at the tour's final concert can be found on the video: Spice Girls Live at Wembley Stadium, filmed in London, on 20 September 1998. During the Return of the Spice Girls tour, "Mama" was performed as the second song from the show's fifth segment. All five girls stood together holding hands to perform it, while the LED screens in the background showed photos of their mothers holding baby pictures of the group, and a montage of them and their children. For the British shows, fifty young girls from the Capital Children's Choir dressed in white came out from a platform and lined the stage against the backdrop screens to sing with the Spice Girls.

== Formats and track listings ==
- UK, Australian and European CD1; Japanese CD single
1. "Mama" (radio version) – 3:40
2. "Who Do You Think You Are" (radio version) – 3:44
3. "Baby Come Round" – 3:22
4. "Mama" (Biffco mix) – 5:49
- German CD
1. "Mama" (radio version) – 3:40
2. "Mama" (album version) – 5:03
3. "Who Do You Think You Are" (radio version) – 3:44
- Digital EP
1. "Mama" (Biffco mix) – 5:49
2. "Who Do You Think You Are" (radio version) – 3:44
3. "Baby Come Round" – 3:22

== Credits and personnel ==
- Spice Girls – lyrics, vocals
- Matt Rowe – lyrics, producer, keyboards and programming
- Richard Stannard – lyrics, producer, keyboards and programming
- Dave Way and Absolute – audio mixing
- Adrian Bushby – recording engineer
- Patrick McGovern – assistant
- Greg Lester – rhythm guitar
- Tony Ward – cello
- Jackie Drew – violin
- Mark Beswick – choir arrangement

Published by Windswept Pacific Music Ltd and PolyGram Music Publishing Ltd.

== Charts ==
All entries charted with "Who Do You Think You Are" unless otherwise noted.

=== Weekly charts ===
Weekly chart performance for "Mama"
| Chart (1997–2013) | Peak position |
|---|---|
| Australia (ARIA) | 13 |
| Austria (Ö3 Austria Top 40) "Mama" only | 1 |
| Belgium (Ultratop 50 Flanders) | 10 |
| Belgium (Ultratop 50 Wallonia) | 7 |
| Estonia Airplay (Eesti Top 25) | 3 |
| Europe (Eurochart Hot 100) | 3 |
| Finland (Suomen virallinen lista) "Mama" only | 15 |
| France (SNEP) | 16 |
| Germany (GfK) | 4 |
| Hungary (Mahasz) | 8 |
| Ireland (IRMA) | 1 |
| Italy (Musica e dischi) | 12 |
| Italy Airplay (Music & Media) "Mama" only | 7 |
| Japan (Japan Hot 100) "Mama" only | 72 |
| Latvia (Latvijas Top 20) "Mama" only | 1 |
| Netherlands (Dutch Top 40) | 2 |
| Netherlands (Single Top 100) | 3 |
| New Zealand (Recorded Music NZ) | 6 |
| Norway (VG-lista) | 12 |
| Scottish Singles Sales (Official Charts) | 1 |
| Sweden (Sverigetopplistan) | 5 |
| Switzerland (Schweizer Hitparade) | 6 |
| UK Singles (Official Charts) | 1 |
| UK Airplay (Music Week) | 15 |

| Chart (2021) | Peak position |
|---|---|
| UK Downloads (OCC) | 31 |

=== Year-end charts ===
Year-end chart performance for "Mama"
| Chart (1997) | Position |
|---|---|
| Australia (ARIA) | 95 |
| Austria (Ö3 Austria Top 40) | 21 |
| Belgium (Ultratop 50 Flanders) | 46 |
| Belgium (Ultratop 50 Wallonia) | 28 |
| Europe (Eurochart Hot 100) | 22 |
| Germany (Media Control) | 46 |
| Netherlands (Single Top 100) | 30 |
| New Zealand (RIANZ) | 44 |
| Sweden (Topplistan) | 33 |
| Switzerland (Schweizer Hitparade) | 31 |
| UK Singles (OCC) | 15 |

== Certifications ==
Certifications and sales for "Mama"
| Region | Certification | Certified units/sales |
|---|---|---|
| Belgium (BRMA) | Gold | 25,000^{*} |
| Germany (BVMI) | Gold | 250,000^{^} |
| Netherlands (NVPI) | Gold | 50,000^{^} |
| New Zealand (RMNZ) | Gold | 5,000^{*} |
| Sweden (GLF) | Gold | 15,000^{^} |
| United Kingdom (BPI) | Platinum | 786,000 |
^{*} Sales figures based on certification alone.^{^} Shipments figures based on certification alone.

== Release history ==
Release dates and formats for "Mama" (Note: "Mama" was released as a double A-side single with "Who Do You Think You Are".)
| Region | Date | Format(s) | Label(s) | Ref. |
|---|---|---|---|---|
| Germany | 3 March 1997 | Maxi CD | EMI | |
| United Kingdom | 3 March 1997 | Cassette; two maxi CDs | Virgin | |
| Japan | 16 April 1997 | Maxi CD | Toshiba EMI | |
| Germany | 25 April 1997 | Maxi CD (limited) | EMI | |

== Bibliography ==
- Canfield, Jack; Hansen, Mark Victor; Geffen, Jo-Ann; Dozier, Lamont (2009). Chicken Soup for the Soul: The Story behind the Song. Chicken Soup for the Soul. ISBN 978-1-935096-40-5.
- Cripps, Rebecca; Peachey, Mal; Spice Girls (1997). Real Life: Real Spice The Official Story. Zone/Chameleon Books. ISBN 0-233-99299-5.
- De Ribera Berenguer, Juan (1997). Colección: Ídolos del Pop-Spice Girls (in Spanish). Editorial La Máscara. ISBN 84-7974-236-4.
- Kutner, Jon; Leigh, Spencer (2005). 1000 UK Number One Hits. Omnibus Press. ISBN 1-84449-283-4.
- McGibbon, Rob (1997). Spice Power: The Inside Story. Macmillan Publishers Ltd. ISBN 0-7522-1142-0.
- Sinclair, David (2004). Wannabe: How the Spice Girls Reinvented Pop Fame. Omnibus Press. ISBN 0-7119-8643-6.
- Spice Girls (1997a). Girl Power!. Zone/Chameleon Books. ISBN 0-233-99165-4.
- Spice Girls (1997b). Spice World: The Movie. Three Rivers Press. ISBN 0-609-80338-7.
- Spice Girls (2008). Spice Girls Greatest Hits (Piano/Vocal/Guitar) Artist Songbook. Hal Leonard Corporation. ISBN 978-1-4234-3688-1.
