= Christmas in Spiceworld Tour =

1999 concert tour by the Spice Girls

- National tour by Spice Girls
- Location: England, Europe
- Start date: 4 December 1999
- End date: 15 December 1999
- Legs: 1
- No. of shows: 8
- Attendance: 153,717
- Box office: US$5,784,510

Spice Girls concert chronology
- Spiceworld Tour (1998); Christmas in Spiceworld Tour (1999); The Return of the Spice Girls (2007–2008)

Christmas in Spiceworld Tour was the second concert tour by English girl group the Spice Girls. The eight-show tour was launched following "solo projects, marriages, motherhood and another round of slagging in the press", as a reunion for the girls. The eight-show tour was attended by more than 153,000 people, grossing $5.7 million in ticket sales. The first four shows saw the group play at Manchester Evening News Arena to over 72,400 fans, grossing $2.6 million; the second portion of the tour saw the group play another four shows at Earls Court Arena to 81,300 fans, grossing $3.1 million.

== Background ==
After a period of hiatus, during which the members of the group launched their solo careers and focused on their personal lives, the media started speculating that they would break-up. However, in April 1999, they announced a Christmas tour for that year. Band member Victoria Beckham commented about the tour, saying, "We can't wait. We've had a bit of time to come home, chill out, do bits and pieces on our own so we're going to get back together".

== Development ==
The stage was their most complex and most accommodating. It was set up at the far right corner of the arena with a small platform with some props such as Christmas trees. From the small platform, there was a 100ft catwalk that led to a pentagonal main stage capped with a giant icicle. The main stage was nearly in the middle of the arena, and in its center there was a pit that contained the band. Above the pit were four small runways onto the circular center piece of the stage which could be raised up and rotated. Above the main stage, in addition to stage lights, there were Christmas-type features such as a fake ice pillar. During the whole show the girls would move from the main stage to the circular one in the center on the main stage.

== Concert synopsis ==
The show was divided into three sections: Forever Spice, Supergirls, and It's Christmas!. The concert starts out with a musical intro composed by Nathan McCree. The girls then made their entrance on the small stage and performed "Spice Up Your Life" as they made their way down the catwalk to the main stage, while a man on the screens delivered the lyrics in sign-language. They next performed "Something Kinda Funny" as the second song. When "Say You'll Be There" was performed, it started with a slightly faster a cappella version of the song. They next sang "Right Back At Ya", introduced by the girls as a comeback song and as a get back to the critics, who said they would split. Next was "Step to Me", and then they sang "Mama" sat on Val Doonican stools, as a gospel choir appeared and a string section rose through the floor. After a performance of "Too Much", "W.O.M.A.N" was introduced as a new song from their third album. For the last song of the set, Mel B and Emma Bunton would go into the audience and pick two members of the audience to join them in "2 Become 1".

There was a short intermission, during which the tour dancers performed on roller skates. After the intermission, the girls reappeared and began "Stop" on the center stage while it rotated around the stage. "Holler" was sung by them as one of the new songs. "Who Do You Think You Are" was remixed into an orchestral song. "Never Give Up On The Good Times" had an interlude before the final verse and the girls acted as superheroes. "Wannabe" was also remixed for the tour and "Goodbye" was performed with a choir and ended with a long orchestral interlude as the girls left the stage. At the beginning of the third section, church bells were heard before "Viva Forever" started. The choir performed for the final time with the Spice Girls during "Viva Forever". Next, the girls sang a Christmas medley, before reprising "Wannabe".

== Incident ==
A crew member died on 16 December 1999 after falling "more than 80ft" at Earls Court Arena while dismantling the set from the Spice Girls' performance.

== Broadcast ==
The full concert at Earl's Court was broadcast live on Sky One at 8 p.m. and also included a behind-the-scenes documentary containing rehearsals and interviews with the Spice Girls.

== Set list ==
1. "Spice Up Your Life"
2. "Something Kinda Funny"
3. "Say You'll Be There"
4. "Right Back at Ya"
5. "Step to Me"
6. "Mama"
7. "Too Much"
8. "W.O.M.A.N"
9. "2 Become 1"
10. "Stop"
11. "Holler"
12. "Who Do You Think You Are"
13. "Never Give Up on the Good Times"
14. "Wannabe"
15. "Goodbye"

Encore

16. "Viva Forever"
17. "Merry Xmas Everybody" / "I Wish It Could Be Christmas Everyday"
18. "Wannabe" (Reprise)

== Tour dates ==
Date	City	Country	Venue	Attendance	Revenue
4 December 1999	Manchester	England	Manchester Evening News Arena	72,408 / 72,408	$2,648,990
5 December 1999	Manchester	England	Manchester Evening News Arena	72,408 / 72,408	$2,648,990
7 December 1999	Manchester	England	Manchester Evening News Arena	72,408 / 72,408	$2,648,990
8 December 1999	Manchester	England	Manchester Evening News Arena	72,408 / 72,408	$2,648,990
11 December 1999	London	England	Earls Court Arena	81,309 / 81,309	$3,135,520
12 December 1999	London	England	Earls Court Arena	81,309 / 81,309	$3,135,520
14 December 1999	London	England	Earls Court Arena	81,309 / 81,309	$3,135,520
15 December 1999	London	England	Earls Court Arena	81,309 / 81,309	$3,135,520
Total				153,717 / 153,717 (100%)	$5,784,510

== Personnel ==
Performers

- Emma Bunton - vocals
- Melanie Brown - vocals
- Melanie Chisholm - vocals
- Victoria Beckham - vocals

Band

- Simon Ellis - musical director / keyboards
- Michael Martin - keyboards
- Paul Gendler - guitar
- John Thompson - bass
- Fergus Gerrand - drums

Brass

- James Lynch - trumpet
- Mike Lovitt - trumpet
- Howard McGill - sax
- Winston Rollins - trombone

Strings

- Audrey Riley - arranger
- Chris Tomling - 1st violin

Violins

- Greg Warren Wilson
- Richard George
- Anne Morffe
- Laura Melhewish
- Darren Morgan
- Helen Patterson

Violas

- Susan Dench
- Peter Collyer
- Bridget Carrie

Celli

- Sophie Harris
- Joy Hayley

Management and additional personnel

- Richard Jones - tour manager
- Peter Barnes - show producer, lighting & set designer
- Chris Vaughan - production manager
- Ray Furze - sound engineer
- Darrin Henson, Melinda McKenna - choreography
- Julien MacDonald and Academy Costumes - Stage outfits
