= Mel B discography =

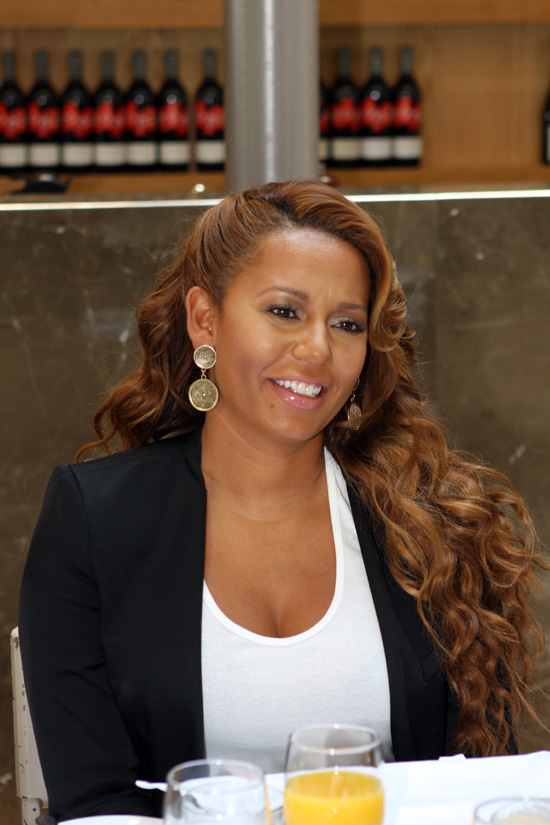
- Melanie Brown in 2011
- Studio albums: 2
- Singles: 7
- Music videos: 8

The discography of Mel B, an English pop singer-songwriter, consists of two studio albums, six singles, six music videos and one DVD.

On 9 October 2000 she released her first studio album, "Hot", which also included her number one duet with Missy Elliott for the song "I Want You Back". The second single release from the album was "Word Up", reaching No. 14 in the UK. "Tell Me" was released in 2000, debuted at No. 4 on the UK Singles Chart. The song sold approximately 100,000 copies, making it the 158th highest-selling single of 2000. A fourth single was released in February 2001, "Feels So Good", which peaked at No. 5, followed by a final single, "Lullaby", a pop number dedicated to her daughter. The single entered and peaked at No. 13. The album was not a success and garnered mediocre reviews, selling 7,419 copies in its first week and charting at No. 28, before quickly falling out of the charts, leading to Virgin dumping Brown from their label.

In 2005 Brown decided to release a new album by independent label Amber Café. L.A. State of Mind was released on 27 June 2005 in two formats: as a regular CD and as a limited edition with a DVD documentary. The only single from the album, "Today", peaked at number 41 in the UK. The album did not reach the UK Albums Chart.

In September 2013, Brown independently released her first single in eight years, "For Once in My Life".

In April 2026, Hot was released, for the first time, on vinyl. The album reached a new peak of number 3 on the UK R&B Albums Chart, on 24 April 2026.

== Studio albums ==
List of studio albums, with selected chart positions, sales and certifications
| Title | Details | Peak chart positions | | | | | Certifications |
| Title | Details | UK | UK R&B | AUS | JPN | SCO | Certifications |
|---|---|---|---|---|---|---|---|
| Hot | Released: 9 October 2000; Format: cassette, CD, digital download; Label: Virgin | 28 | 3 | 144 | 10 | 47 | BPI: Silver |
| L.A. State of Mind | Released: 27 June 2005; Format: CD, digital download; Label: Amber Café | 453 | — | — | — | | |

== Singles ==
=== As main artist ===
List of singles, showing year released, selected chart positions, certifications and originating album
| Title | Year | Peak chart positions | | | | | | | | | | Certifications | Album |
| Title | Year | UK | UK Indie | AUS | BEL | IRE | ITA | NL | SCO | SWI | US Dance | Certifications | Album |
|---|---|---|---|---|---|---|---|---|---|---|---|---|---|
| "I Want You Back" (featuring Missy Elliott) | 1998 | 1 | — | 12 | 24 | 6 | — | 6 | 6 | 25 | — | BPI: Silver | Why Do Fools Fall in Love |
| "Word Up" | 1999 | 13 | — | 114 | — | — | 34 | 86 | 19 | — | — | | Austin Powers |
| "Tell Me" | 2000 | 4 | — | 43 | 58 | 22 | 61 | 44 | 7 | 66 | — | | Hot |
| "Feels So Good" | 2001 | 5 | — | — | 60 | 42 | — | 85 | 8 | 88 | — | | Hot |
| "Lullaby" | 2001 | 13 | — | — | — | 47 | — | — | 18 | — | — | | Hot |
| "Today" | 2005 | 41 | 7 | — | — | — | — | — | 38 | — | — | | L.A. State of Mind |
| "For Once in My Life" | 2013 | — | 30 | — | — | — | — | — | — | — | 2 | | Non-album single |
"—" denotes releases that did not chart or were not released in that territory

=== As featured artist ===
List of singles as featured artist, showing year released, selected chart positions and originating album
| Title | Year | Peak chart positions | | Album |
| Title | Year | UK | SCO | Album |
|---|---|---|---|---|
| "Proper Crimbo" (amongst Bo' Selecta! cast) | 2003 | 4 | 5 | Non-album single |

== Music videos ==
List of music videos, showing year released, director and notes
| Title | Year | Director | Notes |
|---|---|---|---|
| "I Want You Back" | 1998 | Hype Williams | Featuring Missy Elliott |
| "Word Up" | 1999 | Jimmy Gulzar & Wiz | UK version |
| "Word Up" | 1999 | Matthew Rolston | U.S. version |
| "Tell Me" | 2000 | Nigel Dick | |
| "Feels So Good" | 2000 | Martin Weisz | |
| "Lullaby" | 2001 | Andy Orrick | |
| "Proper Crimbo" | 2003 | —N/a | |
| "Today" | 2005 | Mark McConnell | |
| "The One That Got Away" | 2007 | Ray Kay | Starring Johnta Austin |
| "2012 (It Ain't the End)" | 2010 | Erik White | Starring Jay Sean |
| "Vacation" | 2013 | Hannah Lux Davis | Starring G.R.L. |
| "For Once in My Life" | 2013 | Martin Weisz | |
| "Spice Girl" | 2017 | Adam Aminé Daniel | Starring Aminé |
| "Love Should Not Hurt" | 2021 | Fabio D’Andrea | Starring Fabio D'Andrea |
