= Mel B =

British singer and TV personality (born 1975)

Mel B MBE
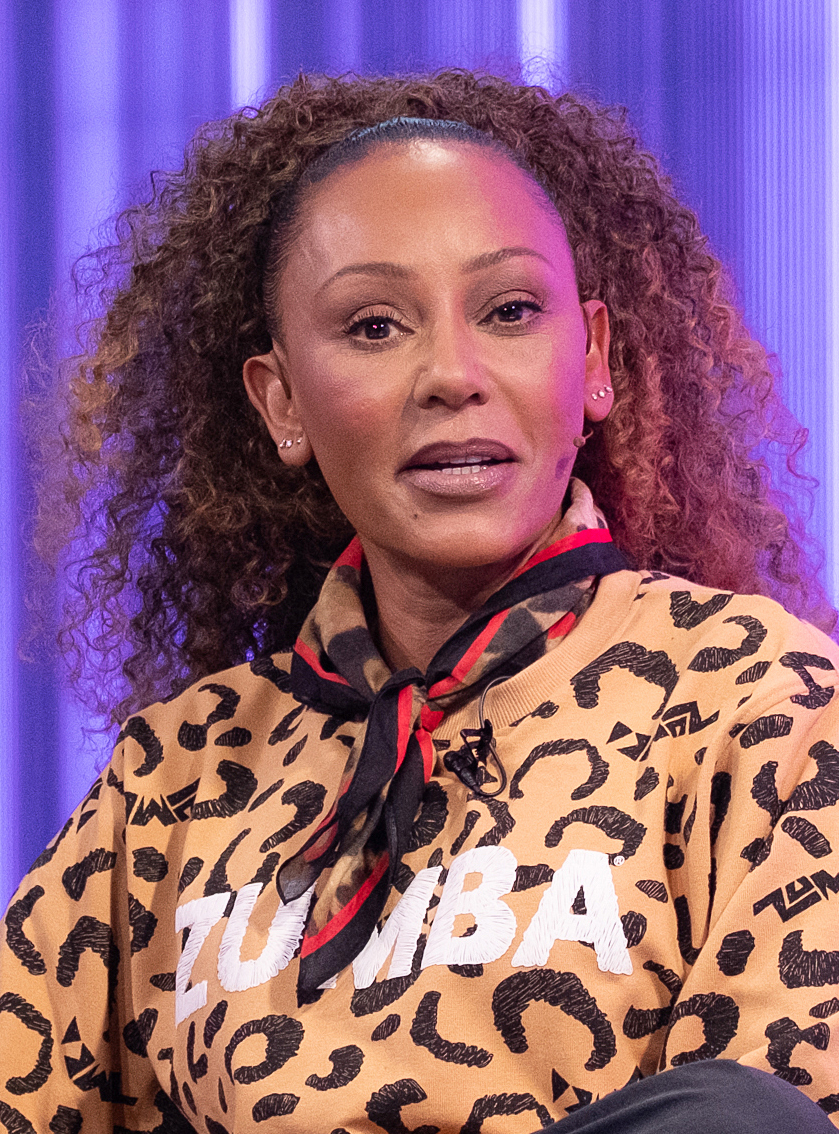
- Mel B at SXSW London 2026
- Born: Melanie Janine Brown; 29 May 1975 (age 51); Leeds, West Yorkshire, England
- Other names: Scary Spice; Melanie B; Mel G; Melanie G; Melanie Gulzar; Melanie McPhee
- Occupations: Singer; television personality; actress; dancer
- Years active: 1993–present
- Works: Solo discography; Spice Girls discography and songs
- Spouses: Jimmy Gulzar (m. 1998; div. 2000); Stephen Belafonte (m. 2007; div. 2017); Rory McPhee (m. 2025)
- Partners: Max Beesley (2000–2002); Christine Crokos (2002–2006); Eddie Murphy (2006)
- Children: 3
- Relatives: Christian Cooke (cousin)
- Awards: Hon D Univ, Leeds Beckett University
- Musical career
- Genres: R&B; pop; hip hop; dance
- Instrument: Vocals
- Labels: Virgin; Amber Café; EMI
- Formerly of: Spice Girls

Melanie Janine Brown (born 29 May 1975), commonly known as Mel B or Melanie B, is an English singer, television personality, and actress. She rose to prominence in the mid-1990s as a member of the pop group the Spice Girls, where she was nicknamed Scary Spice. With over 100 million records sold worldwide, the Spice Girls are the best-selling female group in history. The group went on an indefinite hiatus in 2000, before reuniting for a greatest hits album in 2007 and two concert tours: the Return of the Spice Girls (2007–2008) and Spice World (2019).

Mel B debuted as a solo artist in 1998 with the release of "I Want You Back" which peaked atop the UK Singles Chart. Her debut solo studio album, Hot (2000), produced the successful singles "Tell Me" and "Feels So Good". Her second studio album, L.A. State of Mind (2005), spawned the single "Today". Mel B released "For Once in My Life" in 2013, her first single in eight years; it peaked at number 2 on the Billboard Hot Dance Club Songs chart.

Since 2007, Mel B has established herself as a television personality and talent show judge. She participated on the fifth season of the American dance competition series Dancing with the Stars (2007), finishing in second place with her professional partner, Maksim Chmerkovskiy. Between 2011 and 2016, Mel B served as a guest and main judge on the Australian and British shows of The X Factor. In 2012, she co-presented the Australian version of Dancing with the Stars for one season. Mel B has also judged on America's Got Talent (2013–2018, 2025–present), The Voice Kids Australia (2014), The Masked Singer Australia (2022–2023), Queen of the Universe (2023), and America's Got Talent: Fantasy League (2024). From 2016 to 2018, she co-presented Lip Sync Battle UK alongside rapper Professor Green.

Mel B was appointed Member of the Order of the British Empire (MBE) in the 2022 New Year Honours for services to charitable causes.

== Early life ==
Melanie Janine Brown was born in Harehills, Leeds, and grew up in the Burley area of the city, the daughter of Martin Brown and wife Andrea Dixon, daughter of Stanley Dixon and wife Eileen Mary Dixon. Her father was from Saint Kitts and Nevis and her mother is English. Through her mother, Mel B is a first cousin of actor and director Christian Cooke; Cooke's mother Di and Mel B's mother Andrea are sisters. On her paternal side, Carlisle Powell, a former Nevisian government minister, is one of her cousins; his son is cricketer Kieran Powell.

During her youth in Leeds, Mel B reportedly babysat Micah Richards, who later became a professional footballer and England international. Richards recalled the experience during an episode of the football podcast The Rest Is Football, which he co-hosts alongside Alan Shearer and Gary Lineker.

Mel B attended Kirkstall Road Primary School in Kirkstall, Leeds, and she studied performing arts at Intake High School in Rodley, Leeds before entering the entertainment industry.

For a time, she worked as a dancer in Blackpool, Lancashire.

== Career ==
=== 1994–2000: Spice Girls ===
In 1994, Mel B, along with Melanie C, Geri Halliwell and Victoria Adams responded to an advertisement in The Stage magazine. Around 400 women who answered the advertisement attended auditions at Danceworks Studios in Mayfair, London. Halliwell, Melanie C, Adams, Mel B, and Michelle Stephenson were originally chosen as the members of the group which was known as Touch. Stephenson later left and was replaced by Emma Bunton.

The group were unsatisfied with their original management, Heart Management, and broke with them. In 1995, they toured record labels in London and Los Angeles. After teaming up with music manager Simon Fuller, they signed a deal with Virgin Records and the group name was changed to Spice Girls. Their debut album, Spice, was a worldwide commercial success. The album peaked at number one in more than 17 countries and was certified multi-platinum in 27 countries. The group's massive and sudden popularity was compared to Beatlemania. In total the album sold 30 million copies worldwide and became the biggest-selling album in music history by a girl group and one of the most successful albums of all time. The album's first single, "Wannabe", reached number one in 37 countries and all of the subsequent singles from the album – "Say You'll Be There", "2 Become 1", "Who Do You Think You Are" and "Mama" – also peaked at number one in United Kingdom.

In 1997, they released their second album, Spiceworld. The album's first two singles "Spice Up Your Life" and "Too Much" reached number one in the UK, marking seven consecutive number one singles, an all-time record for a musical group. The album was a global best seller, selling 20 million copies worldwide. The group also starred in their own film, Spiceworld: The Movie, which grossed $100 million worldwide. The third single from Spiceworld, "Stop", peaked at two, breaking the group's sequence of number ones. "Viva Forever" was released as the album's final single in July 1998. The single was another number one and was the group's first single released following Halliwell's departure from the group in May 1998.

Mel B debuted as a solo artist in September 1998 with the release of "I Want You Back". The single charted at number 1 on the UK Singles Chart and also had success around the globe. The song was recorded for the soundtrack of the film Why Do Fools Fall in Love. The single sold 218,000 copies and became the 82nd Bestselling British Single of the year. In late 1998, the Spice Girls released "Goodbye" as a four-piece. It topped the UK Singles Chart and became their third consecutive Christmas number-one – equalling the record previously set by The Beatles.

=== 1999–2004: Hot and acting ===
In 1999, Mel B began recording her debut album, working with producers Sisqó, Teddy Riley, and Jimmy Jam and Terry Lewis, the latter of whom she was also working with on the Spice Girls' third album, Forever. At the suggestion of her then-husband Jimmy Gulzar, Mel B covered Cameo's 1986 hit "Word Up" as her next solo release. The track was included on the soundtrack to Austin Powers: The Spy Who Shagged Me. The song charted poorly, peaking at fourteen on the UK Singles Chart, making it the lowest-charting Spice Girls-related single of the '90s. Turning to television work, she hosted Pure Naughty, a weekly BBC2 magazine show focusing on black music. She hosted the MOBO Awards on two occasions, in 1998 with Bill Bellamy and in 1999 with Wyclef Jean, and took part in the BBC-funded short film Fish. She hosted a number of TV shows such as This Is My Moment (a talent show) for ITV1 and shot a documentary called Voodoo Princess for Channel 4. She took part in smaller projects as a presenter such as Top of the Pops, Party in the Park for The Prince's Trust and The All Star Animal Awards. She appeared as herself in an advert for the Yorkshire tourist board in a series which included contributions from other Yorkshire-born celebrities, and in the film Happy Birthday Oscar Wilde.

Mel B's debut album Hot was released in October 2000, a month before the final Spice Girls album Forever was released. Following the release of Forever, which was far less successful than their previous two albums, the Spice Girls stopped recording and the members began investing more time into their solo careers. Hot was not a success and garnered mediocre reviews, selling a disappointing 7,419 copies in its first week and charting at No.28. Hot was preceded by the lead single "Tell Me" in September 2000. "Tell Me" debuted at No. 4 in the UK charts with about 40,000 copies sold in its first week of release. It sold approximately 100,000 copies, making it the 158th "best seller" of 2000. In February 2001, "Feels So Good" was released as the second single from the album and peaked at No.5. It followed by "Lullaby" in June, a pop number dedicated to her daughter. It was accompanied by a video shot in Morocco and featured Mel B with Phoenix Chi. The media criticised Mel B for using her child in the music video and single artwork, labelling her "Desperate Spice" and insinuating that she was exploiting her child as a marketing tool. The single entered and peaked at No. 13. Mel B left Virgin records in July 2001.

In 2002, Mel B released her autobiography, Catch a Fire, which reached No.7 in the official books chart, and saw her touring the UK to promote it with a run of book signings. In 2003 Mel B's first movie role came in the form of a British drama, Burn It. She acted in a long run of shows as part of the cast for The Vagina Monologues. She was in the movie The Seat Filler, co-produced by Will Smith and starring Destiny's Child star Kelly Rowland. In April 2004, Mel B took part in the musical Rent as Mimi Marquez on Broadway.

=== 2005–2008: L.A. State of Mind and Spice Girls reunion ===
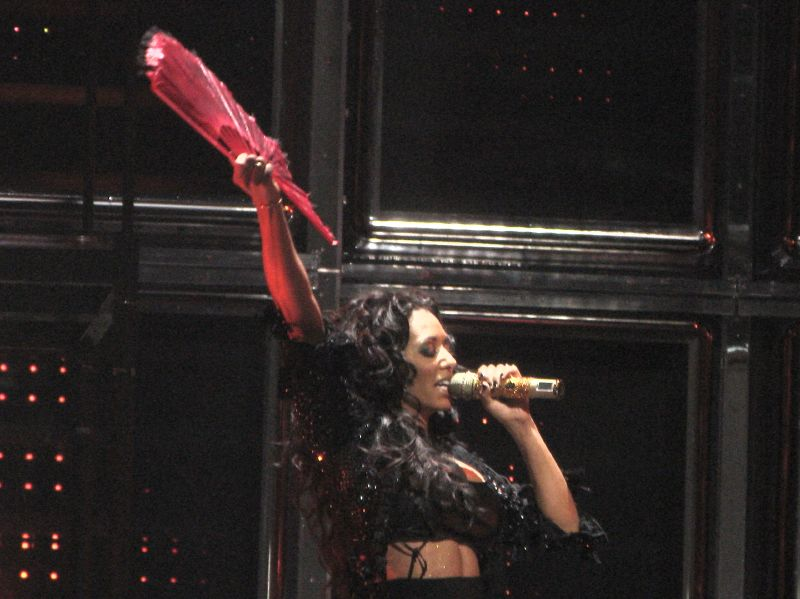
Mel B performing in 2007 with the Spice Girls

After Rent, Mel B began recording new songs and decided to release them through an independent label, Amber Café. Mel B said that she was working on acoustic music in contrast with her previous releases. The resulting album, L.A. State of Mind, was released on 27 June 2005. It was released with a bonus DVD featuring an in-depth documentary filmed and directed by Mark McConnell. In a scathing review, AllMusic stated that this album was one of the worst pop albums of the decade. The only single from the album, "Today", saw a UK release in June 2005. "Today" entered the singles chart at No. 41, selling around 1,000 copies in its first week. The same year, Mel B appeared in the films Telling Lies and LD 50 Lethal Dose. In 2006, Mel B appeared in the short film Love Thy Neighbor.

In September 2007, Mel B joined the fifth season of the US television dance competition, Dancing with the Stars with her partner Maksim Chmerkovskiy. On 27 November 2007, they took second place in the show, losing to Hélio Castroneves and his partner, Julianne Hough. That year, the Spice Girls re-grouped and announced plans for a reunion tour, from which they were said to have earned £10 million each (approximately $20 million). The group released Greatest Hits in early November 2007 and the tour began on 2 December 2007. The Spice Girls appeared in Tesco advertisements, for which they were paid £1 million each.

=== 2009–2018: Television and other projects ===
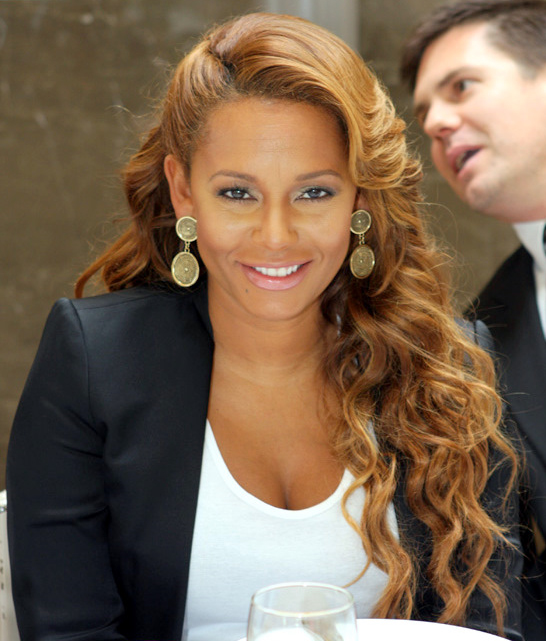
Mel B at The New Face of Jenny Craig, in 2011

In April 2009, Mel B joined actress and former Dancing with the Stars champion Kelly Monaco as original stars of a Las Vegas revue called Peepshow at the Las Vegas Planet Hollywood Hotel and Casino. In September 2009, Mel B appeared for a week of shows as a visiting panellist on ITV1's daily lunchtime show Loose Women. From June through August 2010, Mel B hosted the Oxygen weight loss show Dance Your Ass Off. In September 2010, her own reality show aired on the Style Network called Mel B: It's an Scary World. In November 2010, the console game Get Fit with Mel B was released in North America and Europe. Mel B served as a celebrity mentor on the second season of the Australia show of The X Factor during the quarter-final of the live shows in 2010. During the results show, she performed a duet with the remaining five acts singing "Stop" originally by the Spice Girls.

Mel B was featured as a judge for the third series of the Australia show of The X Factor, which premiered in August 2011 as Kyle Sandilands' replacement. She appeared alongside Ronan Keating, Guy Sebastian, and Natalie Bassingthwaighte. For her first series on the show, she was given the Girls category. In April 2012, Mel B appeared as co-host on twelfth season of the Australian version of Dancing with the Stars. On 31 March, it was announced that Mel B signed a global partnership with EMI Music Australia for the release of her third studio album, but she later broke from the contract.

Mel B returned for the fourth series of The X Factor Australia and mentored the Boys category. Her contestant Jason Owen reached the final, but runner-up to Samantha Jade, mentored by Guy Sebastian. In June 2012, Mel B appeared as a guest judge for the Manchester auditions of The X Factor UK.

In July 2012, Mel B reunited with the Spice Girls for a one-off performance at the 2012 Summer Olympics Closing Ceremony in London, performing their hits "Wannabe" and "Spice Up Your Life". The performance was the most tweeted moment of the entire Olympics with over 116,000 tweets on Twitter per minute. Later in the year, the Spice Girls reunited again to launch and attend the premiere of the musical Viva Forever!. The group appeared in the documentary Spice Girls' Story: Viva Forever!, which aired on 24 December 2012 on ITV1.

In March 2013 it was confirmed that Mel B would judge Australia's Got Talent to replace Dannii Minogue and that she would not return as a judge for the fifth season of The X Factor Australia and was replaced by Minogue, due to her commitments with Australia's Got Talent. However, Seven, the Australian TV network that airs The X Factor Australia, filed suit to prevent Mel B from appearing on Australia's Got Talent and any rival networks. The judge ruled that Mel B was still under contract with Seven until January 2014, which prevented her from appearing on a programme aired by another network until after that date.

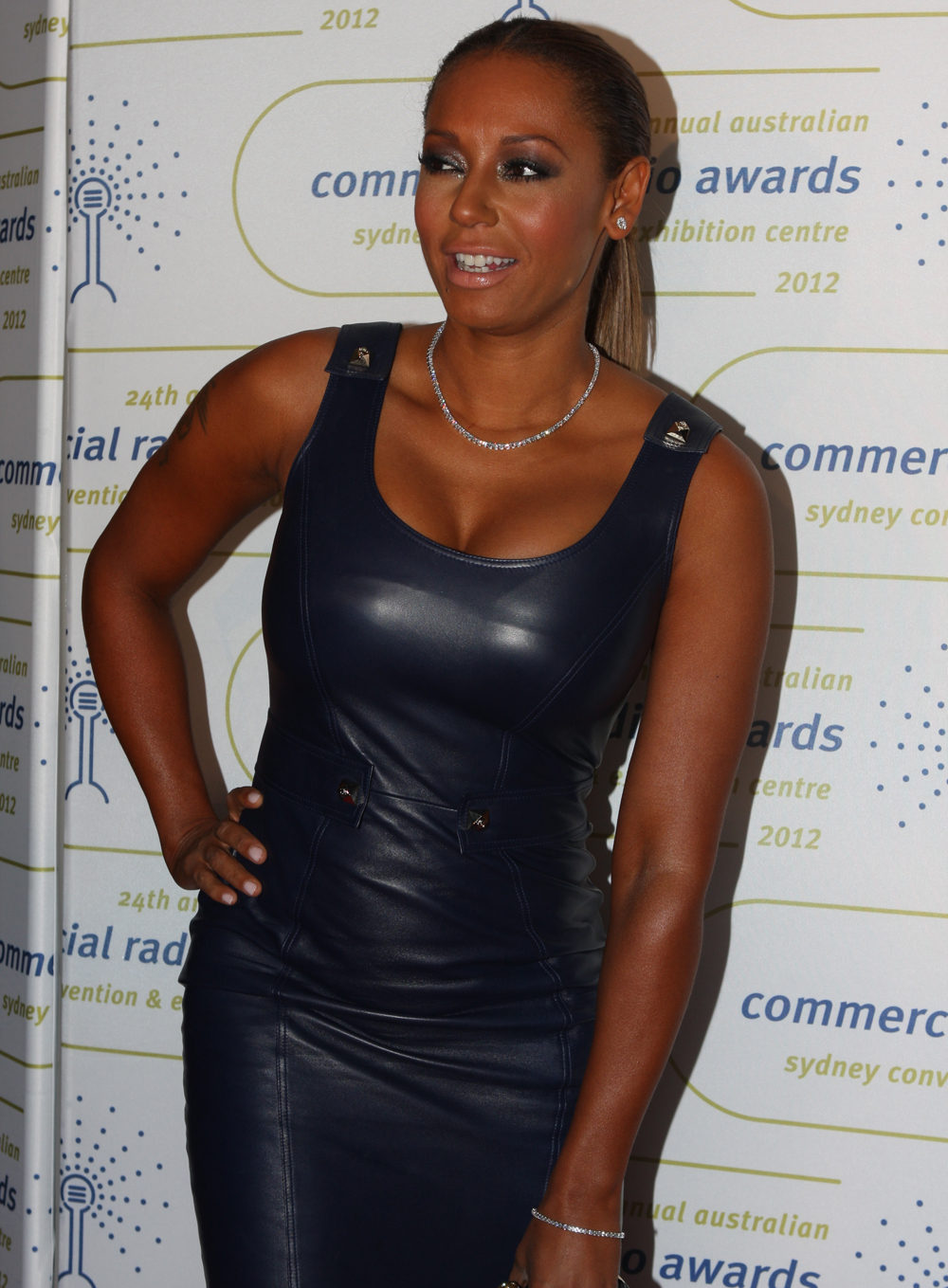
Mel B at the Australian Commercial Radio Awards in October 2012

Mel B had a small part in the final episode of the ITV2 drama series Secret Diary of a Call Girl. In 2013, she appeared in the Lifetime movie Twelve Trees of Christmas. From August to September 2013, she was a judge on the televised dancing show, Stepping Out, alongside choreographers Wayne Sleep and Jason Gardiner. That month, Mel B released her first single in eight years, "For Once in My Life". The single peaked at No.2 on the Billboard Hot Dance Club Songs charts.

On 20 February 2013, NBC announced that Mel B would be a judge on America's Got Talent for its eighth season, alongside Howie Mandel, Howard Stern, Heidi Klum, and later Simon Cowell in 2016. Mel B judged seasons 8 through 13, and the first season of America's Got Talent: The Champions before her departure was announced in February 2019.

In early 2014, Mel B become a coach on the Australia show of The Voice Kids, alongside singers Joel Madden and Delta Goodrem. Later that year, Mel B was a permanent judge for the eleventh series of The X Factor UK when she replaced Nicole Scherzinger. In December 2014, Mel B missed The X Factor UK Saturday final due to illness and did not return for the twelfth series, and was replaced by Rita Ora In the same year, Mel B became a guest co-host on the Breakfast programme of Sydney radio station 2Day FM, alongside Jules Lund, Merrick Watts and Sophie Monk. In late 2014, she appeared on The Big Fat Quiz of the Year and a sketch with the cast of Coronation Street for charity telethon Text Santa.

In January 2016, Mel B began presenting Lip Sync Battle UK alongside Professor Green. Later that year, Mel B guest judged the thirteenth series of The X Factor UK at the London auditions for Scherzinger. In 2016 she announced that the Spice Girls – except for Victoria Beckham and Melanie C – were working on new material and a 20th anniversary tour for 2017. Plans for a reunion were dropped when Halliwell announced she was expecting her second child. Mel B also confirmed her return to The X Factor Australia after a three-year absence to replace Minogue. In 2017 she returned to Broadway to star in the musical Chicago as Roxie Hart. The same year, she returned to acting in the movie Chocolate City: Vegas Strip and made a cameo in the movie Killing Hasselhoff. In late 2017, Mel B had a cameo appearance in the music video for "Spice Girl" by Aminé.

=== 2018–2025: Second Spice Girls reunion and further television work ===
On 5 November 2018, Mel B announced the Spice Girls reunion tour on her Instagram profile. It was confirmed that Mel B and ex-bandmates Melanie C, Bunton and Halliwell (but not Beckham) would return for a 13-date UK and Ireland stadium tour Spice World - 2019 Tour, their first in a decade. In 2021, Mel B appeared on the second series of The Masked Singer as "Seahorse" and finished in 11th place. In May 2021, Mel B collaborated with Fabio D'Andrea in his short music film, "Love Should Not Hurt", in support of Women's Aid. In 2021, she also appeared on the Spanish version of The Masked Singer as "Medusa" and finished in ninth place. Mel B later appeared on the panel of the fourth season of the Australian version of The Masked Singer as Minogue's replacement, and remained on the panel for the fifth season in the second half of 2023. Also in the same year, she appeared as a guest star in the French version of The Masked Singer and covered Katy Perry's "Roar".

Mel B was appointed Member of the Order of the British Empire (MBE) in the 2022 New Year Honours for services to charitable causes and vulnerable women. Mel B was also appointed as a tourism ambassador from the United Kingdom to Nevis in 2022. In November 2022, Mel B presented the BBC documentary Trailblazers: A Rocky Mountain Road Trip alongside Ruby Wax and Emily Atack. In December 2022, she starred in the Christmas TV A New Diva’s Christmas Carol, alongside Ashanti and Vivica A. Fox.

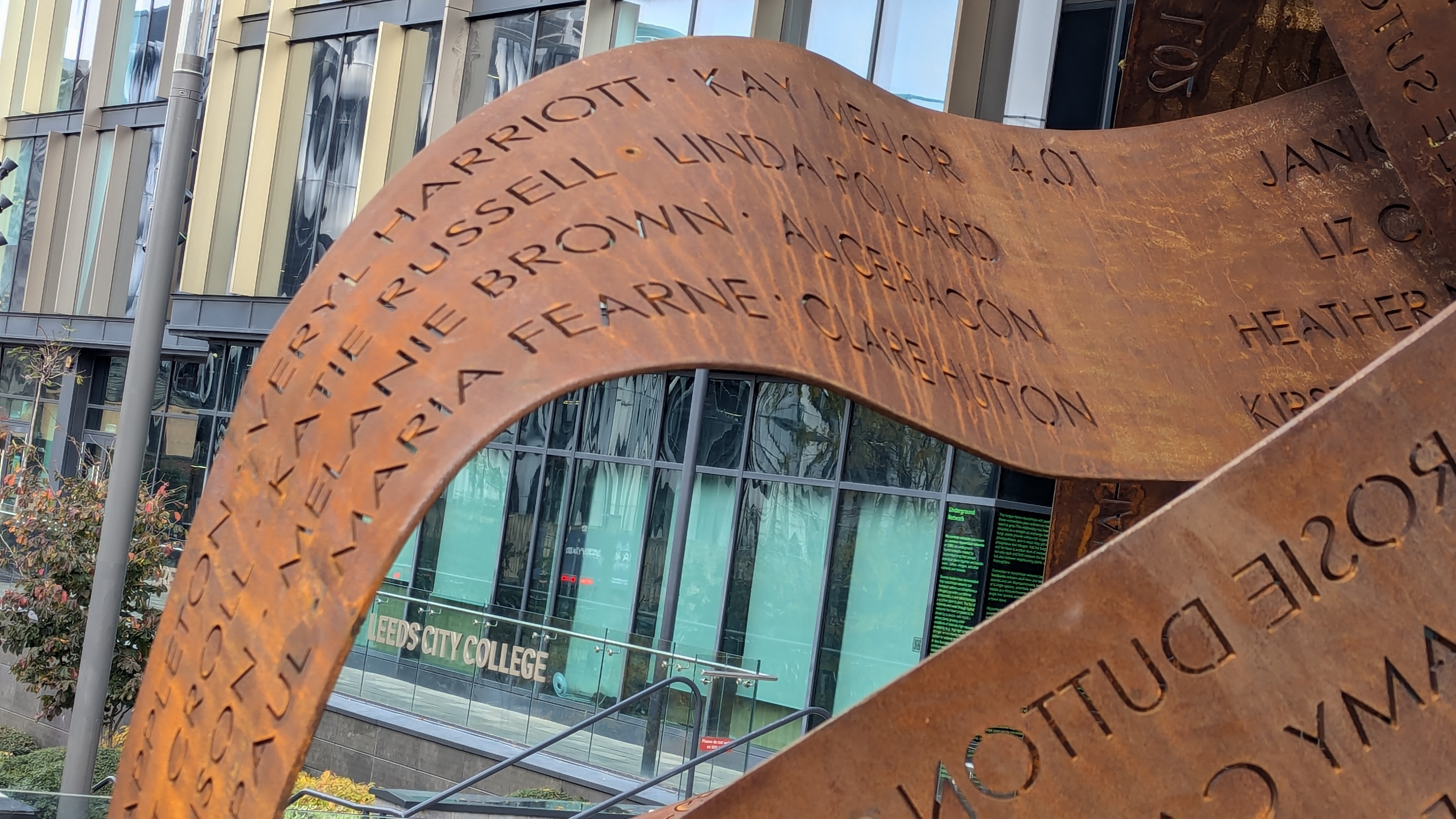
Segment of Ribbons sculpture, unveiled in 2024, featuring names of Mel B, geologist Maria Fearne, Alice Bacon, and Kay Mellor

In June 2023, Mel B announced that she would appear as a judge on the second season of the Paramount+ reality series Queen of the Universe. In 2024, Mel B returned to America's Got Talent to judge on the spinoff, America's Got Talent: Fantasy League. In 2025, Mel B was a contestant on Netflix's reality competition television series, Celebrity Bear Hunt. On 3 February 2025, it was announced Mel B would return as a judge for the 20th season of the main America's Got Talent show after her last appearance in 2019 replacing Heidi Klum.

=== 2026: Hot vinyl release ===
On 18 April 2026, Hot was released on vinyl for the first time, as part of that year's Record Store Day; one week later, the album reached a new peak of number three on the UK R&B Albums Chart.

== Personal life ==
From 1996 to 1997, Mel B dated Icelandic businessman Fjölnir Thorgeirsson.

In March 1998, Mel B began a relationship with Dutch dancer Jimmy Gulzar while on the Spiceworld Tour. They became engaged on 13 May 1998; she became pregnant that June, and the couple were married in Little Marlow, Buckinghamshire, on 13 September 1998. Mel B changed her stage name to Melanie G while they were married. Their daughter was born on 19 February 1999. Mel B filed for divorce in 2000, and the divorce was finalised later that year. Mel B won custody, and paid a settlement of £1.25 million to Gulzar. Gulzar was prosecuted for threatening Mel B and attacking her sister, Danielle. In April 2001, Gulzar was found guilty of the assault, but later cleared by the court.

From 2000 to 2002, Mel B was in a relationship with actor Max Beesley.

From 2002 to 2006, she was in a relationship with the film producer Christine Crokos. Mel B and Crokos lived together in Los Angeles, California. Speaking to Gay Star News about the relationship, she said: "It wasn't experimentation. I fell in love with a woman for five years. An experiment doesn't last five years." Asked about the relationship, Mel B said: "People call me lesbian, bisexual or heterosexual, but I know who's in my bed and that's it. I have a huge libido and a great sex life." Mel B and Crokos's relationship ended in 2006. Mel B said that she had had a four-year relationship with a woman when she was in her teens. In a 2019 interview with Piers Morgan, Mel B was asked if she had slept with Halliwell in an intimate manner and she nodded yes. Halliwell released a statement saying that the press reports following the interview had been "hurtful to her family". Mel B later said: "I just said it was like a little thing and we giggled about it the next day and that’s that. It's the press [who] have taken it onto a whole new level."

Mel B became the subject of tabloid stories during her relationship with actor Eddie Murphy, who is the father of Mel B's second child, born 3 April 2007. By early December 2006, Mel B and Murphy had separated. Murphy told a journalist that the parentage of Mel B's then-unborn baby could not be proven until a paternity test was performed. On 22 June 2007, a court-ordered DNA test confirmed that Murphy was the child's father. Murphy admitted paternity and indicated that he and Mel B had reached a paternity settlement of $US7 million.

In February 2007, Mel B began dating film producer Stephen Belafonte. They secretly married on 6 June 2007 in Las Vegas, US. They renewed their vows in front of their families on 8 November 2008 in Hurghada, Egypt. On 1 September 2011, Mel B gave birth to her third daughter. On 11 December 2014, she attempted suicide by taking nearly 200 Aspirin pills. Mel B and Belafonte separated in December 2016. Mel B filed for divorce from her second marriage in March 2017, and accused Belafonte of emotional and physical abuse. In court, Belafonte's representative said that due to the couple's "extravagant and affluent" lifestyle, Mel B had "wiped out all her Spice Girls money – approximately $50 million (£38.3 million), if not more". The divorce was finalised on 15 December 2017. Mel B cited her divorce from Belafonte and her father's death as her reasons for seeking treatment for PTSD. In November 2018, Mel B became a patron of the domestic violence survivors' charity Women's Aid.

In December 2018, Mel B collapsed, breaking several of her ribs and suffering a serious cut to her hand, for which she underwent emergency surgery. In 2019, Mel B revealed she has been diagnosed with anxiety, dyspraxia, dyslexia and ADHD. In October 2022, Mel B announced she was engaged to Rory McPhee. It is thought the pair have been in a relationship since 2018. In January 2024, she said that former Spice Girls group member, Victoria Beckham, would be designing her wedding dress. On 5 July 2025, the couple married at St Paul's Cathedral in London.

In July 2024, Mel B was awarded an Honorary Doctorate by Leeds Beckett University for her career and work for the charity Women's Aid.

== Discography ==
- Hot (2000)
- L.A. State of Mind (2005)

== Filmography ==
=== Television ===
Year	Title	Role	Notes
1993	Coronation Street	Amy Nelson (uncredited)	1 episode
1993–1994	Emmerdale	Extra	2 episodes
1998	MOBO Awards	Co-presenter	With Bill Bellamy
1999	Pure Naughty	Presenter	
1999	MOBO Awards	Co-presenter	With Wyclef Jean
2001	This Is My Moment	Presenter	Television singing competition
2002	Voodoo Princess	Presenter	Television documentary
2003	Burn It	Claire McAdams	Main role
2004	The Seat Filler	Sandy	Supporting Role
2005	Bo' Selecta!	Herself	Episode: "Avid Merrion's Christmas Special"
2007	Dancing with the Stars	Contestant	Season 5
2008	Miss Universe 2008	Presenter	
2008	The Singing Office	Presenter	
2008	Step It Up and Dance	Guest Judge	Episode: "An Scary Surprise"
2009	Loose Women	Panellist	Series 14
2009	Living on the Breadline	Mother	Television documentary
2010	Dance Your Ass Off	Presenter	Season 2
2010	Mel B: It's a Scary World	Herself	Reality series
2010	The Spin Crowd	Herself	Episode: "The SPINdustry"
2010–2012, 2016	The X Factor	Judge / Mentor	Season 2 (guest); Season 3–4, 8 (main)
2011	Secret Diary of a Call Girl	Sylvia Burke	Episode: "4.8"
2012	The Spice Girls Story: Viva Forever!	Herself	Television documentary
2012	Dancing with the Stars Australia	Presenter	Season 12
2012	Britain's Next Top Model	Guest Judge	1 episode
2012–2016	The X Factor UK	Judge / Mentor	Series 9 and 13 (guest); Series 11 (main)
2013	Twelve Trees of Christmas	Cordelia	Television film
2013	The Eric Andre Show	Herself	
2013	Miss Universe 2013	Presenter	
2013	Stepping Out	Judge	
2013–2018, 2025–present	America's Got Talent	Judge	Season 8–13, 20–present
2014	Whose Line Is It Anyway?	Herself	Episode: "Mel B"
2014	The Voice Kids: Australia	Judge / Mentor	
2014	The Pro	Herself	Television film
2014	Black Dynamite	Connie Lingus (voice)	Episode: "How Honeybee Got Her Groove Back"
2014	MOBO Awards	Co-presenter	With Sarah-Jane Crawford
2014	Text Santa	Santa's Body Guard	Television special
2014	The Big Fat Quiz of the Year	Panelist	
2015	Project Runway	Guest Judge	Season 14; Episode: "The Runway's in 3D!"
2015	RuPaul's Drag Race	Guest Judge	Season 7 Episodes: "ShakesQueer" and "Countdown to the Crown"
2016	Running Wild with Bear Grylls	Herself	1 episode
2016	Ant & Dec's Saturday Night Takeaway	Herself	1 episode
2016–2018	Lip Sync Battle UK	Presenter	
2018	Loose Women	Panelist	
2019	America's Got Talent: The Champions	Judge	
2019	Drop the Mic	Herself	Series 3, Episode 6
2019–2020	Celebrity Juice	Panelist	Team Captain on 2 series
2020	Michael McIntyre's The Wheel	Herself	Celebrity Expert on The Spice Girls
2021	The Masked Singer UK	Herself / The Seahorse	
2021	Mask Singer: Adivina quién canta	Herself / The Jellyfish (Medusa)	
2021	Name That Tune	Herself	Guest; 1 episode
2022	The Circle	Contestant	Season 4; played with Emma Bunton, as catfish "Jared"
2022	RuPaul's Drag Race UK	Guest Judge	Series 4
2022	Trailblazers: A Rocky Mountain Road Trip	Presenter	
2022	A New Diva's Christmas Carol	Herself	Television Christmas movie
2022	Special Forces: World's Toughest Test	Contestant	Voluntarily Withdrawn in Episode 3
2022–2024	Celebrity Gogglebox	Herself	Series "Celebrity 4" and "Celebrity 6" (appears alongside daughter Phoenix Chi in the latter)
2022–2023	The Masked Singer Australia	Judge	Seasons 4–5
2023	Queen of the Universe	Judge	
2023	The Masked Singer France	Herself / The Sun	Season 5 Special Guest, 1 episode
2024	America's Got Talent: Fantasy League	Judge/Mentor	
2025	KPopped	Herself / Western Collaborator	Episode: "Itzy"
2025	Happy Town	Herself / Narrator	Seasons 1 & 2

=== Films ===
Year	Title	Role	Notes
1997	Spice World	Scary Spice	Golden Raspberry Award for Worst Actress; Nominated – Golden Raspberry Award for Worst New Star
1998	Creche Landing	Lola (voice)	
2000	Fish	Angela	
2003	LD 50 Lethal Dose	Louise	
2004	Happy Birthday Oscar Wilde	Herself	Documentary
2005	The Seat Filler	Sandie	
2005	Telling Lies	Maggie Thomas	
2006	Love Thy Neighbor	Lonnie	
2007	Giving You Everything	Herself	Documentary
2014	Tinker Bell and the Legend of the NeverBeast	Fury (voice)	UK version
2017	Chocolate City: Vegas Strip	Brandy	
2017	Killing Hasselhoff	Herself	
2021	Love Should Not Hurt	Victim	Short Film in support of Women's Aid

== Theatre credits ==
Year	Title	Role
2004	Rent	Mimi Marquez
2009	Peepshow	Peep Diva
2016–2017	Chicago	Roxanne "Roxie" Hart
2019	Brutally Honest	Herself

== Bibliography ==
- Brown, Melanie. (2002). Catch a Fire: The Autobiography. Headline Book Publishing. ISBN 978-0755310630
- Brown, Melanie. (2018). Brutally Honest. Quadrille Publishing Ltd. ISBN 9781787133525
- Brown, Melanie. (2024). Brutally Honest: The Sunday Times Bestseller. Quadrille Publishing Ltd. ISBN 9781837831562
