= Lip Sync Battle UK =

- Genre: Reality competition
- Based on: Lip Sync Battle
- Presented by: Mel B Professor Green
- Opening theme: "20th Century Boy" performed by T. Rex
- Country of origin: United Kingdom
- No. of series: 2
- No. of episodes: 15

Production
- Production location: BBC Elstree Centre
- Running time: 30 minutes (inc. adverts)
- Production company: Whizz Kid Entertainment (eOne)

Original release
- Network: Channel 5
- Release: 8 January 2016 – 7 April 2018

Lip Sync Battle UK is a British musical reality competition television series based on the American version of the same name. It premiered on Channel 5 on 8 January 2016. It is hosted by Mel B and Professor Green. The concept was introduced on the American chat show Late Night with Jimmy Fallon, in which celebrities battle each other with lip sync performances. It has been used as a recurring segment on The Tonight Show Starring Jimmy Fallon before being developed as a separate show.

== Production ==
Whizz Kid Entertainment, producers of the series, announced that the first series would consist of eight episodes. However, upon broadcast, only six episodes were shown, with two episodes, Daisy Lowe vs Matt Richardson and Chris Ramsey vs Aston Merrygold, remaining unaired. On 7 November 2016 Channel 5 confirmed that a second series, comprising six episodes, plus an additional Christmas Special, had been ordered and would broadcast from January 2017.

Despite this, only four episodes aired, with episodes Robert Webb vs Sally Phillips and Joey Essex vs Louie Spence going unaired. In March 2018, the third run of episodes was broadcast by Channel 5; however, despite some listings referring to them as a third series, the four-episode run consisted of the four unaired episodes from the first two series.

== Series overview ==
| Series | Episodes | Originally aired | | Series average (millions) |
| Series | Episodes | First aired | Last aired | Series average (millions) |
|---|---|---|---|---|
| 1 | 8 | 8 January 2016 | 20 May 2016 | 1.83 |
| CS | 1 | 20 December 2016 | | TBA |
| 2 | 6 | 6 January 2017 | 7 April 2018 | TBA |

== Episodes ==
Winners are listed in bold

=== Series 1 (2016) ===
| No. overall | No. in series | Contestants | Original release date | UK viewers (millions) |
|---|---|---|---|---|
| 1 | 1 | **Alesha Dixon** vs. David Walliams | 8 January 2016 | 2.36 |
Dixon: "Shutdown" by Skepta "Bad Blood" by Taylor Swift Walliams: "Work It" by Missy Elliott "Hello" by Adele
| 2 | 2 | **Jason Manford** vs. Michelle Keegan | 15 January 2016 | 2.35 |
Manford: "Forget You" by CeeLo Green "Let It Go" by Idina Menzel Keegan: "Wannabe" by Spice Girls "Sex on Fire" by Kings of Leon
| 3 | 3 | **Rufus Hound** vs. Jorgie Porter | 22 January 2016 | 1.95 |
Hound: "And I Am Telling You I'm Not Going" by Jennifer Holliday "Boom! Shake the Room" by DJ Jazzy Jeff & The Fresh Prince Porter: "Talk Dirty" by Jason Derulo "I'm a Slave 4 U" by Britney Spears
| 4 | 4 | **Katherine Ryan** vs. Kayvan Novak | 29 January 2016 | 1.70 |
Ryan: "Pass Out" by Tinie Tempah "Sorry" by Justin Bieber Novak: "Roll with It" by Oasis "Faith" by George Michael
| 5 | 5 | **Carol Vorderman** vs. Martin Kemp | 5 February 2016 | 1.58 |
Vorderman: "All About That Bass" by Meghan Trainor "Gold" by Spandau Ballet Kemp: "Best Song Ever" by One Direction "Gangsta's Paradise" by Coolio
| 6 | 6 | **Johnny Vegas** vs. Vic Reeves | 12 February 2016 | 1.05 |
Vegas: "Can't Feel My Face" by The Weeknd "There Must Be an Angel (Playing with My Heart)" by Eurythmics Reeves: "Harder, Better, Faster, Stronger" by Daft Punk "Israelites" by Desmond Dekker
| 7 | 7 | **Chris Ramsey** vs. Aston Merrygold | 25 March 2016 | N/A |
Ramsey: "Ignition (Remix)" by R. Kelly "St. Elmo's Fire (Man in Motion)" by John Parr Merrygold: "SexyBack" by Justin Timberlake "Like A Virgin" by Madonna
| 8 | 8 | Daisy Lowe vs. **Matt Richardson** | 20 May 2016 | N/A |
Lowe: "The Real Slim Shady" by Eminem "Fever" by Peggy Lee Richardson: "Livin' on a Prayer" by Bon Jovi "I Want It That Way" by Backstreet Boys

=== Christmas Special (2016) ===
| No. overall | No. in series | Contestants | Original release date | UK viewers (millions) |
|---|---|---|---|---|
| 8 | – | **Shane Richie** vs. Jessie Wallace | 20 December 2016 | 0.69 |
Richie: "Fairytale of New York" by The Pogues feat. Kirsty MacColl (as Kirsty MacColl) "Low" by Flo Rida feat. T-Pain Wallace: "Fairytale of New York" by The Pogues feat. Kirsty MacColl (as Shane MacGowan) "Get the Party Started" by Pink Also featured a special guest appearance from Johnny Vegas.

=== Series 2 (2017–2018) ===
| No. overall | No. in series | Contestants | Original release date | UK viewers (millions) |
|---|---|---|---|---|
| 9 | 1 | **Craig Revel Horwood** vs. Danny Dyer | 6 January 2017 | 1.75 |
Revel Horwood: "Total Eclipse of the Heart" by Bonnie Tyler "Toxic" by Britney Spears Dyer: "Fire" by Kasabian "Back to Black" by Amy Winehouse
| 10 | 2 | **Alexander Armstrong** vs. Jimmy Carr | 13 January 2017 | 1.61 |
Armstrong: "I Don't Feel Like Dancin'" by Scissor Sisters "I Believe in a Thing Called Love" by The Darkness Carr: "Lose Yourself" by Eminem "Poker Face" by Lady Gaga
| 11 | 3 | **Ben Fogle** vs. Katie Price | 20 January 2017 | 1.52 |
Fogle: "Party in the USA" by Miley Cyrus "Bonkers" by Dizzee Rascal feat. Armand Van Helden Price: "My Humps" by The Black Eyed Peas "9 to 5" by Dolly Parton
| 12 | 4 | **Peter Andre** vs. Gino D'Acampo | 27 January 2017 | 1.61 |
Andre: "Bad" by Michael Jackson "Get Ur Freak On" by Missy Elliott D'Acampo: "Mysterious Girl" by Peter Andre "I Believe I Can Fly" by R. Kelly
| 13 | 5 | **Robert Webb** vs. Sally Phillips | 17 March 2018 | TBC |
Webb: "Careless Whisper" by George Michael "Can’t Get You Out Of My Head" by Kylie Minogue Phillips: "Gangnam Style" by PSY "I'm Gonna Be (500 Miles)" by The Proclaimers
| 14 | 6 | **Joey Essex** vs. Louie Spence | 7 April 2018 | TBC |
Essex: "No Scrubs" by TLC "Smooth Criminal" by Michael Jackson Spence: "Rapper's Delight" by The Sugarhill Gang "I Wanna Dance with Somebody (Who Loves Me)" by Whitney Houston
