= List of songs recorded by the Spice Girls =

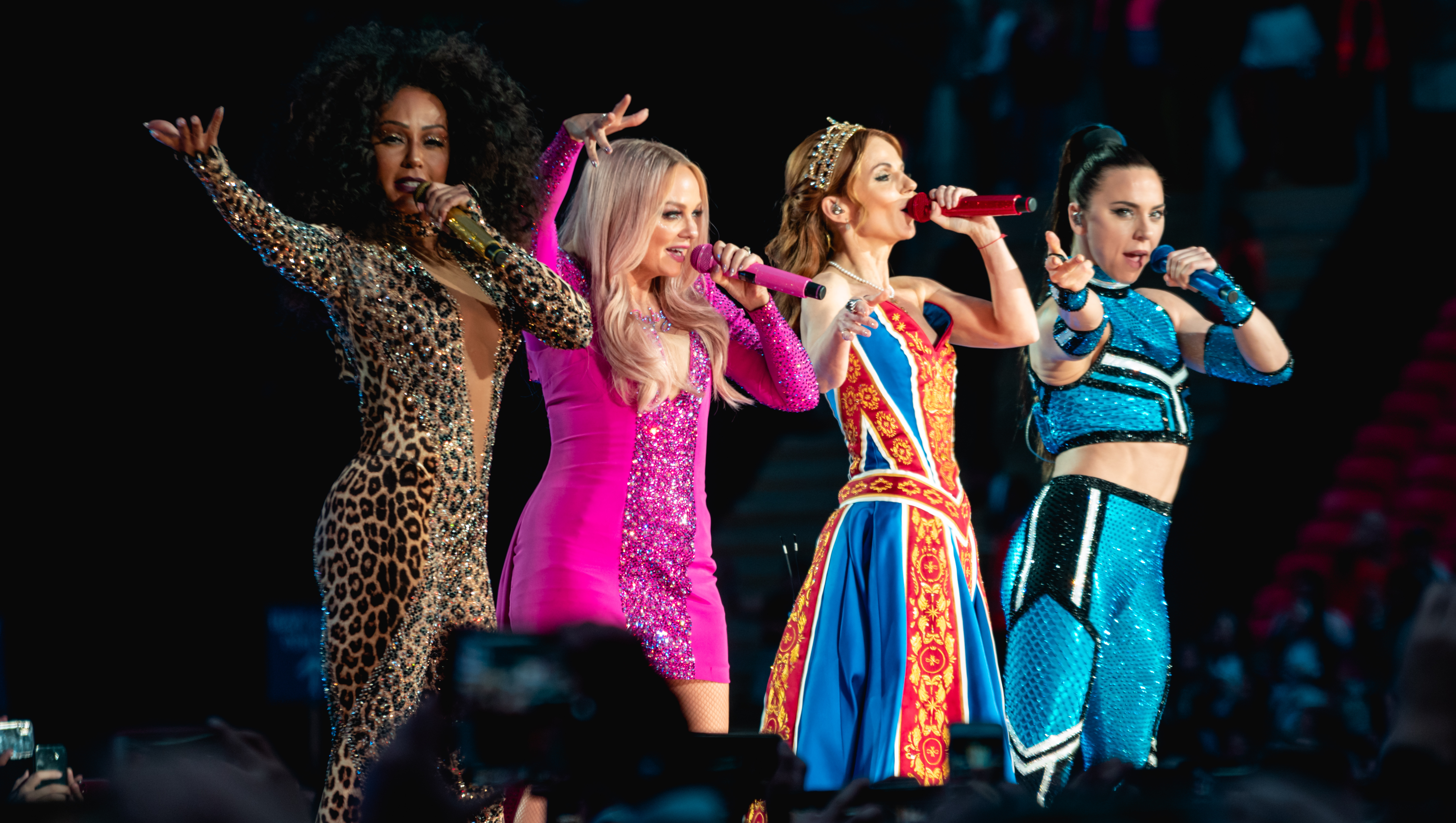
The Spice Girls in 2019

The Spice Girls are an English girl group that consists of Mel B, Victoria Beckham, Emma Bunton, Melanie C and Geri Halliwell. The following is a list of songs by the group.

== Released songs ==
List of released songs, showing writers name, original release and year released
Song	Writer(s)	Originating album	Year released	Ref.
"(How Does It Feel to Be) On Top of the World"	Ian McCulloch; Johnny Marr	Non-album single	1998	
"2 Become 1"	Victoria Beckham; Emma Bunton; Mel B Melanie C Geri Halliwell; Richard Stannard; Matt Rowe	Spice	1996	
"Ain't No Stoppin' Us Now"	Jerry Cohen; Gene McFadden; John Whitehead	Non-album single (B-side of "Stop")	1997	
"Baby Come Round"	Victoria Beckham; Emma Bunton; Mel B Melanie C Geri Halliwell; Richard Stannard; Matt Rowe	Non-album single (B-side of "Mama"/"Who Do You Think You Are")	1996	
"Bumper to Bumper"	Victoria Beckham; Emma Bunton; Mel B Melanie C Cathy Dennis; Geri Halliwell; Andy Watkins; Paul Wilson	Non-album single (B-side of "Wannabe")	1996	
"Christmas Wrapping"	Chris Butler	Non-album single (B-side of "Goodbye")	1998	
"Denying"	Victoria Beckham; Emma Bunton; Mel B Melanie C Geri Halliwell; Andy Watkins; Paul Wilson	Spiceworld	1997	
"Do It"	Victoria Beckham; Emma Bunton; Mel B Melanie C Geri Halliwell; Andy Watkins; Paul Wilson	Spiceworld	1997	
"Do You Think About Me"	Alan Glass; Georgie Trevorson; Roger Russell	The Singles Collection	2026	
"Feed Your Love"	Victoria Beckham; Emma Bunton; Mel B Melanie C Geri Halliwell; Richard Stannard; Matt Rowe	Wannabe 25	2021	
"Get Down with Me"	Victoria Beckham; Emma Bunton; Mischke Butler; Mel B LaShawn Daniels; Rodney Jerkins; Fred Jerkins III; Robert Smith	Forever	2000	
"Goodbye"	Victoria Beckham; Emma Bunton; Mel B Melanie C Richard Stannard; Matt Rowe	Forever	2000	
"Headlines (Friendship Never Ends)"	Victoria Beckham; Emma Bunton; Mel B Melanie C Geri Halliwell; Richard Stannard; Matt Rowe	Greatest Hits	2007	
"Holler"	Victoria Beckham; Emma Bunton; Mel B Melanie C LaShawn Daniels; Rodney Jerkins; Fred Jerkins III	Forever	2000	
"If U Can't Dance"	Victoria Beckham; Emma Bunton; Mel B Melanie C Geri Halliwell; Richard Stannard; Matt Rowe	Spice	1996	
"If You Wanna Have Some Fun"	Victoria Beckham; Emma Bunton; Mel B Melanie C James Harris III; Terry Lewis	Forever	2000	
"It's Only Rock 'n Roll (But I Like It)"	Jagger–Richards	Non-album single	1999	
"The Lady is a Vamp"	Victoria Beckham; Emma Bunton; Mel B Melanie C Geri Halliwell; Andy Watkins; Paul Wilson	Spiceworld	1997	
"Last Time Lover"	Victoria Beckham; Emma Bunton; Mel B Melanie C Geri Halliwell; Andy Watkins; Paul Wilson	Spice	1996	
"Let Love Lead the Way"	Victoria Beckham; Emma Bunton; Mel B Melanie C LaShawn Daniels; Rodney Jerkins; Fred Jerkins III; Harvey Mason Jr.	Forever	2000	
"Love Thing"	Cary Bayliss; Victoria Beckham; Emma Bunton; Mel B Melanie C Geri Halliwell; Eliot Kennedy	Spice	1996	
"Mama"	Victoria Beckham; Emma Bunton; Mel B Melanie C Geri Halliwell; Richard Stannard; Matt Rowe	Spice	1996	
"Move Over"	Victoria Beckham; Emma Bunton; Mel B Melanie C Geri Halliwell; Clifford Lane; Mary Wood	Spiceworld	1997	
"My Strongest Suit"	Elton John	Elton John and Tim Rice's Aida	1999	
"Naked"	Victoria Beckham; Emma Bunton; Mel B Melanie C Geri Halliwell; Andy Watkins; Paul Wilson	Spice	1996	
"Never Give Up on the Good Times"	Victoria Beckham; Emma Bunton; Mel B Melanie C Geri Halliwell; Richard Stannard; Matt Rowe	Spiceworld	1997	
"One of These Girls"	Victoria Beckham; Emma Bunton; Mel B Melanie C Geri Halliwell; Richard Stannard; Matt Rowe	Non-album single (B-side of "2 Become 1")	1996	
"Outer Space Girls"	Victoria Beckham; Emma Bunton; Mel B Melanie C Geri Halliwell; Andy Watkins; Paul Wilson	Non-album single (B-side of "Too Much")	1997	
"Oxygen"	Victoria Beckham; Emma Bunton; Mel B Melanie C James Harris III; Terry Lewis	Forever	2000	
"Power of 5"	Victoria Beckham; Emma Bunton; Mel B Melanie C Geri Halliwell; Richard Stannard		1997	
"Right Back at Ya"	Victoria Beckham; Emma Bunton; Mel B Melanie C Eliot Kennedy; Tim Lever	Forever	2000	
"Saturday Night Divas"	Victoria Beckham; Emma Bunton; Mel B Melanie C Geri Halliwell; Richard Stannard; Matt Rowe	Spiceworld	1997	
"Say You'll Be There"	Victoria Beckham; Emma Bunton; Mel B Melanie C Geri Halliwell; Eliot Kennedy	Spice	1996	
"Sleigh Ride"	Leroy Anderson	Non-album single (B-side of "2 Become 1")	1996	
"Something Kinda Funny"	Victoria Beckham; Emma Bunton; Mel B Melanie C Geri Halliwell; Andy Watkins; Paul Wilson	Spice	1996	
"Spice Invaders"	Victoria Beckham; Emma Bunton; Mel B Melanie C Geri Halliwell; Andy Watkins; Paul Wilson	Non-album single (B-side of "Spice Up Your Life")	1997	
"Spice Up Your Life"	Victoria Beckham; Emma Bunton; Mel B Melanie C Geri Halliwell; Richard Stannard; Matt Rowe	Spiceworld	1997	
"Step to Me"	Victoria Beckham; Emma Bunton; Mel B Melanie C Geri Halliwell; Eliot Kennedy	Spiceworld	1997	
"Stop"	Victoria Beckham; Emma Bunton; Mel B Melanie C Geri Halliwell; Andy Watkins; Paul Wilson	Spiceworld	1997	
"Take Me Home"	Victoria Beckham; Emma Bunton; Mel B Melanie C Geri Halliwell; Andy Watkins; Paul Wilson	Non-album single (B-side of "Say You'll Be There")	1996	
"Tell Me Why"	Victoria Beckham; Emma Bunton; Mischke Butler; Mel B LaShawn Daniels; Rodney Jerkins; Fred Jerkins III	Forever	2000	
"Time Goes By"	Victoria Beckham; Emma Bunton; Mischke Butler; Mel B LaShawn Daniels; Rodney Jerkins; Fred Jerkins III	Forever	2000	
"Too Much"	Victoria Beckham; Emma Bunton; Mel B Melanie C Geri Halliwell; Andy Watkins; Paul Wilson	Spiceworld	1997	
"Viva Forever"	Victoria Beckham; Emma Bunton; Mel B Melanie C Geri Halliwell; Richard Stannard; Matt Rowe	Spiceworld	1997	
"Voodoo"	Victoria Beckham; Emma Bunton; Mel B Melanie C Geri Halliwell; Richard Stannard; Matt Rowe	Greatest Hits	2007	
"Walk of Life"	Victoria Beckham; Emma Bunton; Mel B Melanie C Geri Halliwell; Andy Watkins; Paul Wilson	Non-album single (B-side of "Too Much")	1997	
"Wannabe"	Victoria Beckham; Emma Bunton; Mel B Melanie C Geri Halliwell; Richard Stannard; Matt Rowe	Spice	1996	
"Wasting My Time"	Emma Bunton; Mel B Melanie C LaShawn Daniels; Fred Jerkins III	Forever	2000	
"Weekend Love"	Victoria Beckham; Emma Bunton; Mel B Melanie C LaShawn Daniels; Rodney Jerkins; Fred Jerkins III	Forever	2000	
"Who Do You Think You Are"	Victoria Beckham; Emma Bunton; Mel B Melanie C Geri Halliwell; Andy Watkins; Paul Wilson	Spice	1996	

== Unreleased songs ==
List of unreleased songs, showing writers name
Song	Writer(s)	Ref.
"A Day in Your Life"	Victoria Beckham; Emma Bunton; Mel B Melanie C Eliot Kennedy	
"Angels"	Victoria Beckham; Heidrun Anna Bjoernsdottir; Emma Bunton; Mel B Melanie C Geri Halliwell; Luc Emile Leroy; Stephane Mickael Mace Yann	
"Go Go Go"	Victoria Beckham; Emma Bunton; Mel B Melanie C Richard Stannard	
"If It's Lovin' on Your Mind"	Victoria Beckham; Emma Bunton; Mel B Melanie C Eliot Kennedy	
"Image & Likeness"	Victoria Beckham; Emma Bunton; Mel B Melanie C Geri Halliwell	
"Overnight"	Victoria Beckham; Emma Bunton; Mel B Melanie C Richard Stannard	
"Pain Proof"	Victoria Beckham; Emma Bunton; Mel B Melanie C Eliot Kennedy	
"Seven Days"	Victoria Beckham; Emma Bunton; Mel B Melanie C Geri Halliwell; Sheppard Solomon; Mark Taylor	
"Song for Her"	Emma Bunton; Mel B Geri Halliwell; Eliot Kennedy	
"Spice is Back"	Victoria Beckham; Emma Bunton; Mel B Melanie C Geri Halliwell; Greg Hatwell	
"Strong Enough"	Victoria Beckham; Emma Bunton; Mel B Melanie C Geri Halliwell; Eliot Kennedy	
"Too Hot"	Victoria Beckham; Emma Bunton; Mel B Melanie C Richard Stannard	
"Treasure"	Victoria Beckham; Emma Bunton; Mel B Melanie C Richard Stannard	
"W.O.M.A.N."	Victoria Beckham; Emma Bunton; Mel B Melanie C Richard Stannard	
