= Dance Your Ass Off season 1 =

Dance Your Ass Off
- Season 1
- Presented by: Marissa Jaret Winokur
- No. of episodes: 11

Release
- Original network: Oxygen Network
- Original release: June 29 – September 7, 2009

Season chronology
- Next → Season 2

The first season of Dance Your Ass Off aired from June 29, 2009, to September 7, 2009. It aired on the Oxygen network. It was the only season to feature Marissa Jaret Winokur as host. The show featured twelve overweight contestants competing to dance and lose weight. The medical doctor was Rob Huizenga from the USA Biggest Loser. For this season, the judges were Danny Teeson, Lisa Ann Walter and Mayte Garcia.

On the finale, Ruben defeated Pinky and Shayla to become the first ever Dance Your Ass Off champion.

== Contestants ==
- Angela - Eliminated Week 1
- Warren - Eliminated Week 2
- Karla - Eliminated Week 3
- Tara - Eliminated Week 4
- Brandon - Eliminated Week 4
- Miles - Eliminated Week 5
- Trice - Eliminated Week 6
- Mara - Eliminated Week 7
- Alicia - Eliminated Week 9
- Shayla - 2nd Runner-Up - Fan Favorite
- Pinky - Runner-Up
- Ruben - Winner

== Weigh ins - Pounds lost per week ==
Most Weight Lost
Least Weight Lost

Contestant	Age	Height	Weight	1	2	3	4	5	6	7	8	9	Finale
Ruben	43	6'0"	314.3	-13.9	-5.1	-7.8	-4.7	-10.3	-6.2	-6.4	-5.4	-7.1	-7.5
Pinky	29	5'3"	186.9	-2.4	-2.6	-2.0	-1.4	-4.2	-1.3	-6.4	-3.7	-1.9	-4.4
Shayla	27	5'7"	206.5	-4.9	-2.7	-2.3	-4.3	-5.0	-3.4	-2.4	-4.5	-2.1	-4.0
Alicia	23	5'4"	257.6	-7.5	-2.8	-2.3	-6.4	-4.2	-6.0	-6.4	-5.9	-3.5	
Mara	32	5'2"	261.9	-6.6	-3.2	-1.8	-3.5	-5.0	-3.0	-2.9			
Trice	24	5'3"	274.9	-11.4	-2.7	-2.9	-5.9	-3.9	-4.2				
Miles	29	5'10"	260.8	-6.9	-2.9	-4.6	-4.3	-6.0					
Brandon	20	5'6"	230.4	-3.6	-1.5	-4.3	-1.7						
Tara	33	5'8"	237.4	-4.5	-3.8	-2.0	-4.2						
Karla	29	5'2"	174.9	-9.5	-4.4	-1.0							
Warren	29	6'0"	357.6	-11.6	-3.6								
Angela	24	5'7"	185.9	-3.5									

== Contestants & Weight per week ==
Contestants are listed in chronological order of elimination.

Contestant	Starting BMI	Current BMI	Starting Weight	Week									Finale	Pounds Lost	Percentage Lost
Contestant	Starting BMI	Current BMI	Starting Weight	1	2	3	4	5	6	7	8	9	Finale	Pounds Lost	Percentage Lost
Ruben	42.6	32.5	314.3	300.4	295.3	287.5	282.8	272.5	266.3	259.9	254.5	247.4	239.9	74.4	23.75
Pinky	33.1	27.7	186.9	184.5	181.9	179.9	178.5	174.3	173.3	166.6	162.9	161	156.6	30.3	16.21
Shayla	32.3	26.8	206.5	201.6	198.9	196.6	192.3	187.3	183.9	181.5	177	174.9	170.9	35.6	17.24
Alicia	44.2	35.9	257.6	250.1	247.3	245	238.6	234.4	228.4	222	216.1	212.6	209.4	48.2	18.71
Mara	47.9	42.1	261.9	255.3	252.1	250.3	246.8	241.8	238.8	235.9			230.4	31.5	12.03
Trice	48.7	41.7	274.9	263.5	260.8	257.9	252	248.1	243.9				235.5	39.4	14.33
Miles	37.4	30.9	260.8	253.9	251	246.4	242.1	236.1					215.5	45.3	17.37
Brandon	37.2	33.7	230.4	226.8	225.3	221	219.3						208.9	21.5	9.33
Tara	36.1	31.4	237.4	232.9	229.1	227.1	222.9						206.3	31.1	13.10
Karla	32.0	27.6	174.9	165.4	161	160							151.1	23.8	13.61
Warren	48.5	44.5	357.6	346	342.4								328.5	29.1	8.14
Angela	29.1	25.6	185.9	182.4									163.6	22.3	12.00

BMI
Normal (18.5 - 24.9 BMI)
Overweight (25 - 29.9 BMI)
Obese Class I (30 - 34.9 BMI)
Obese Class II (35 - 39.9 BMI)
Obese Class III (greater than 40 BMI)
Rankings
Eliminated Contestants Weigh-In (Finale)
Winner ($100,000)
Eliminated Winner ($5,000)
Last person eliminated before finale

== Contestants' average dance scores ==
Best Score of the week.
Worst Score of the week

Contestant	1	2	3	4	5	6	7	8	9	Finale
Ruben	6.0	7.7	7.7	8.7	7.3	8.7	9.2	9.4	9.2	9.5
Pinky	7.3	6.7	8.0	7.7	6.7	8.0	8.0	8.2	9.5	9.5
Shayla	7.0	7.0	7.7	8.7	8.3	9.0	9.4	8.8	9.2	9.0
Alicia	6.3	5.3	7.7	6.3	6.7	8.7	7.7	8.7	8.4	
Mara	7.3	7.3	8.3	6.0	7.7	8.3	8.7			
Trice	6.0	7.3	6.3	6.7	7.0	6.7				
Miles	7.3	6.7	7.7	6.3	5.3					
Brandon	6.7	7.3	6.3	6.0						
Tara	5.7	5.7	7.3	4.3						
Karla	7.0	5.3	5.7							
Warren	5.3	5.0								
Angela	5.3									

Notes:

- The first perfect 10 came in Week 6. The recipient was Shayla. That same week Ruben also received a 10.
- The first perfect score (Three 10's) was the tango that Ruben had danced in Week 7.
- No one was eliminated on Week 8.

== Contestants' overall scores ==
Contestant was in the bottom two of weight loss
Contestant was eliminated
Contestant was in the bottom two of weight loss and eliminated
Contestant was in the bottom two for weight loss and was the winner that week
Contestant was the winner for that week
Contestant danced their ass off and was declared the winner of the show

Contestant	1	2	3	4	5	6	7	8	9	Finale
Ruben	10.43	9.4	10.34	10.33	10.94	10.98	11.60	11.48	11.99	12.53
Pinky	8.58	8.11	9.10	8.48	9.05	8.75	11.70	10.42	10.67	12.23
Shayla	9.37	8.34	8.86	10.89	10.90	10.82	10.71	11.28	10.39	11.29
Alicia	9.21	6.42	8.63	8.91	8.46	11.26	10.50	11.36	10.02	
Mara	9.82	8.55	9.01	7.40	9.73	9.54	9.97			
Trice	10.15	8.32	7.41	8.99	8.55	8.39				
Miles	9.95	7.84	9.53	8.05	7.78					
Brandon	8.26	7.96	8.21	6.77						
Tara	7.60	7.33	8.17	6.15						
Karla	12.43	7.96	6.32							
Warren	8.54	5.90								
Angela	7.18									

== Reunion ==
First aired September 7, 2009
Shayla won Fan Favorite and a check for $5000. Ruben lost more weight, totaling to 90 lbs. Miles and Alicia also lost 90 lbs by the reunion.

Contestant gained some weight back by the reunion.

Contestant	Age	Height	Starting BMI	Finale BMI	Reunion BMI	Start Weight	Finale Weight	Reunion Weight	lbs lost finale	lbs lost reunion
Ruben	43	6'0"	42.6	32.5	30.4	314.3	239.9	224.3	74.4	90
Pinky	29	5'3"	33.1	27.7	27.4	186.9	156.6	154.9	30.3	32
Shayla	27	5'7"	32.3	26.8	24.5	206.5	170.9	156.5	35.6	50
Alicia	23	5'4"	44.2	35.9	28.8	257.6	209.4	167.6	48.2	90
Mara	32	5'2"	47.9	42.1	39.9	261.9	230.4	217.9	31.5	44
Trice	24	5'3"	48.7	41.7	36.5	274.9	235.5	205.9	39.4	69
Miles	29	5'10"	37.4	30.9	24.5	260.8	215.5	170.8	45.3	90
Brandon	20	5'6"	37.2	33.7	34.0	230.4	208.9	210.4	21.5	20
Tara	33	5'8"	36.1	31.4	28.4	237.4	206.3	185.4	31.1	52
Karla	29	5'2"	32.0	27.6	28.3	174.9	151.4	154.9	23.5	20
Warren	29	6'0"	48.5	44.5	45.1	357.6	328.5	332.6	29.1	25
Angela	24	5'7"	29.1	25.6	23.5	185.9	163.6	149.9	22.3	36

BMI
Normal (18.5 - 24.9 BMI)
Overweight (25 - 29.9 BMI)
Obese Class I (30 - 34.9 BMI)
Obese Class II (35 - 39.9 BMI)
Obese Class III (greater than 40 BMI)

== Updates ==
- Warren - he topped the scales at 400 lbs then turned his life around and lost 150 lbs. He has kept the weight off.
- Mara – has lost 60 lbs and wants to lose 20 lbs more - had lost 44 lbs at the reunion
- Trice – has lost 74 lbs - had lost 69 lbs at the reunion
- Alicia – has lost 110 lbs - had lost 90 lbs at the reunion
- Ruben – got Head of Wardrobe position for Cirque du Soleil's newest show, “Viva Elvis” at City Center in Las Vegas
- Tara – has lost 60 lbs, and doing cross-fit to lose 15 more. She is a host for the LIPS Tour-Ladies International Poker Series and Orlando's American Heart Assoc Health Ambassador.
