= Dance Your Ass Off season 2 =

Dance Your Ass Off
- Season 2
- Presented by: Melanie Brown
- No. of episodes: 13

Release
- Original network: Oxygen Network
- Original release: 7 June – 30 August 2010

Season chronology
- ← Previous; Season 1

The second season of Dance Your Ass Off aired from 7 June 2010 to 30 August 2010. This season introduced Melanie Brown as the new host. This was also the first season feature a rotating guest judge every week, with regulars Danny Teeson and Lisa Ann Walter. Like the first season, twelve contestants competed in a dance and weight loss competition.

On the finale, Latoya defeated Adamme & Michael to become the second Dance Your Ass Off champion.

== Contestants ==
- Caleb – Eliminated Week 1
- Meredith – Eliminated Week 2
- Sarah – Eliminated Week 3
- Kiki – Eliminated Week 4
- Briana – Eliminated Week 5 (Injured)
- Erica – Eliminated Week 6
- Katie – Eliminated Week 7
- Stephanie – Eliminated Week 8
- Corey – Eliminated Week 9
- Michael – Eliminated Week 10, Returned Finale, 2nd Runner-Up
- Adamme – Runner-Up
- Latoya – Winner

== Weight ins - pounds lost per week ==
Most Weight Lost
Least Weight Lost
Pounds Lost Not Shown
weight gained
season 2 winner

| Contestant | Age | Height | Weight | 1 | 2 | 3 | 4 | 5 | 6 | 7 | 8 | 9 | 10 | Reunion | Finale |
|---|---|---|---|---|---|---|---|---|---|---|---|---|---|---|---|
| Latoya | 26 | 5'7" | 217 | −9.8 | -0.9 | −8.4 | −2.3 | −4.7 | −3.2 | −6.2 | −6.2 | -5.1 | -1.5 | −10.3 | -4.6 |
| Adamme | 31 | 5'10" | 301.8 | −13.9 | −8.2 | -0.5 | -17.6 | -8.5 | −5.0 | -9.5 | −7.7 | −6.6 | -10.0 | −19.8 | −5.7 |
| Michael | 29 | 6'1" | 285.6 | −13.5 | -8.9 | −9.1 | −5.0 | −6.5 | −6.7 | −4.0 | −6.2 | -9.6 | −4.1 | −12.2 | −5.7 |
| Corey | 29 | 6'5" | 325.9 | -15.2 | −7.3 | -9.3 | −3.8 | −5.6 | -7.8 | −5.7 | -8.1 | −6.1 | | -11.5 | |
| Stephanie | 22 | 5'5" | 207 | −10.9 | −7.9 | −6.3 | -1.4 | −4.0 | -1.7 | −4.5 | +1.0 | | | +1.0 | |
| Katie | 25 | 5'4" | 215.9 | −8.6 | −4.6 | −6.4 | −2.1 | −3.9 | −6.0 | -3.2 | | | | -22.2 | |
| Erica | 29 | 5'4" | 232.7 | -7.9 | −6.5 | −6.8 | -1.4 | −2.5 | −3.8 | | | | | -21.2 | |
| Briana | 22 | 5'1" | 289.6 | −14.3 | −5.8 | −5.7 | −3.1 | N/A | | | | | | -32.3 | |
| Kiki | 27 | 5'4" | 220.4 | −8.4 | −4.5 | −4.7 | −3.1 | | | | | | | -28.3 | |
| Sarah | 24 | 5'3 | 218.7 | −9.8 | −3.1 | −3.6 | | | | | | | | -6.0 | |
| Meredith | 28 | 5'1" | 214.5 | −8.9 | −3.9 | | | | | | | | | -32.8 | |
| Caleb | 25 | 6'4" | 297 | −14.4 | | | | | | | | | | -15.7 | |

== Overall pounds lost ==
weight gained
season 2 winner

| Contestant | Age | Height | Weight | 1 | 2 | 3 | 4 | 5 | 6 | 7 | 8 | 9 | 10 | Reunion | Finale |
|---|---|---|---|---|---|---|---|---|---|---|---|---|---|---|---|
| Latoya | 26 | 5'7" | 217 | 9.8 | 10.7 | 19.1 | 21.4 | 26.1 | 29.3 | 35.5 | 41.7 | 46.8 | 48.3 | 58.6 | 63.2 |
| Adamme | 31 | 5'10" | 301.8 | 13.9 | 22.1 | 22.6 | 40.2 | 47.1 | 52.1 | 61.6 | 69.3 | 75.9 | 85.9 | 105.7 | 111.4 |
| Michael | 29 | 6'1 | 285.6 | 13.5 | 22.4 | 31.5 | 36.5 | 43.0 | 49.7 | 53.7 | 59.9 | 69.5 | 73.6 | 85.8 | 91.5 |
| Corey | 29 | 6'5" | 325.9 | 15.2 | 22.5 | 31.8 | 35.6 | 41.2 | 49.0 | 54.7 | 62.8 | 68.9 | | 80.4 | |
| Stephanie | 22 | 5'5" | 207 | 10.9 | 18.8 | 25.1 | 26.5 | 30.5 | 32.2 | 36.7 | 35.7 | | | 34.7 | |
| Katie | 25 | 5'4" | 215.9 | 8.6 | 13.2 | 19.6 | 21.7 | 25.6 | 31.6 | 34.8 | | | | 56.9 | |
| Erica | 29 | 5'4" | 232.7 | 7.9 | 14.4 | 21.2 | 22.6 | 25.1 | 28.9 | | | | | 50.1 | |
| Briana | 22 | 5'1" | 289.6 | 14.3 | 20.1 | 25.8 | 28.9 | N/A | | | | | | 61.4 | |
| Kiki | 27 | 5'4" | 220.4 | 8.4 | 12.9 | 17.6 | 20.7 | | | | | | | 49.0 | |
| Sarah | 24 | 5'3" | 218.7 | 9.8 | 12.9 | 16.5 | | | | | | | | 22.5 | |
| Meredith | 28 | 5'2" | 214.5 | 8.9 | 12.8 | | | | | | | | | 45.6 | |
| Caleb | 25 | 6'4" | 297 | 14.4 | | | | | | | | | | 30.1 | |

== Contestants & weight per week ==
Contestants are listed in chronological order of elimination.

weight not shown
weight gained
winner

| Contestant | Starting BMI | Current BMI | Starting Weight | Week | | | | | | | | | | | Finale | lbs Lost | % Lost |
| Contestant | Starting BMI | Current BMI | Starting Weight | 1 | 2 | 3 | 4 | 5 | 6 | 7 | 8 | 9 | 10 | Reunion | Finale | lbs Lost | % Lost |
|---|---|---|---|---|---|---|---|---|---|---|---|---|---|---|---|---|---|
| Latoya | 34.0 | 24.1 | 217.0 | 207.2 | 206.3 | 197.9 | 195.6 | 190.9 | 187.7 | 181.5 | 175.3 | 170.2 | 168.7 | 158.4 | 153.8 | 63.2 | 29.12% |
| Adamme | 43.3 | 27.3 | 301.8 | 289.5 | 281.3 | 280.8 | 263.2 | 254.7 | 249.7 | 240.2 | 232.5 | 225.9 | 215.9 | 196.1 | 190.4 | 111.4 | 36.9% |
| Michael | 37.6 | 25.6 | 285.6 | 272.1 | 263.2 | 254.1 | 249.1 | 242.6 | 235.9 | 231.9 | 225.7 | 216.1 | 212.0 | 199.8 | 194.1 | 91.5 | 32% |
| Corey | 38.6 | 29.9 | 325.9 | 310.7 | 303.4 | 294.1 | 290.3 | 284.7 | 276.9 | 271.2 | 263.1 | 257.0 | | 245.5 | | 80.4 | 24.7% |
| Stephanie | 34.4 | 28.7 | 207.0 | 196.1 | 188.2 | 181.9 | 180.5 | 176.5 | 174.8 | 170.3 | 171.3 | | | 172.3 | | 34.7 | 16.7% |
| Katie | 37.1 | 27.3 | 215.9 | 207.3 | 202.7 | 196.3 | 194.2 | 190.3 | 184.3 | 181.2 | | | | 159.0 | | 56.9 | 26.35% |
| Erica | 39.1 | 29.5 | 232.7 | 224.8 | 218.3 | 211.5 | 210.1 | 207.6 | 203.8 | | | | | 182.6 | | 50.1 | 21.53% |
| Briana | 54.7 | 43.2 | 289.6 | 275.3 | 269.5 | 263.8 | 260.7 | N/A | | | | | | 228.4 | | 61.4 | 21.2% |
| Kiki | 37.8 | 29.4 | 220.4 | 212.0 | 207.5 | 202.8 | 199.7 | | | | | | | 171.4 | | 49.0 | 22.2% |
| Sarah | 40.0 | 35.9 | 218.7 | 208.9 | 205.8 | 202.2 | | | | | | | | 196.2 | | 22.5 | 10.28% |
| Meredith | 39.8 | 26.5 | 214.5 | 205.6 | 201.7 | | | | | | | | | 168.9 | | 45.6 | 21.25% |
| Caleb | 36.1 | 32.5 | 297.0 | 282.6 | | | | | | | | | | 266.9 | | 30.1 | 10.1% |

BMI
Normal (18.5 – 24.9 BMI)
Overweight (25 – 29.9 BMI)
Obese Class I (30 – 34.9 BMI)
Obese Class II (35 – 39.9 BMI)
Obese Class III (greater than 40 BMI)

== Contestants average dance scores ==
Best Score of the week.
Worst Score of the week

| Contestant | 1 | 2 | 3 | 4 | 5 | 6 | 7 | 8 | 9 | 10 | Finale |
|---|---|---|---|---|---|---|---|---|---|---|---|
| Latoya | 8.0 | 8.0 | 7.7 | 8.7 | 8.0 | 9.0 | 8.7 | 9.0 | 19.0 | 9.9 | 10.0 |
| Adamme | 9.3 | 8.0 | 9.3 | 7.0 | 9.0 | 8.3 | 8.3 | 8.7 | 18.3 | 9.7 | 9.6 |
| Michael | 6.0 | 6.7 | 8.0 | 6.7 | 5.7 | 8.0 | 7.3 | 7.3 | 16.7 | 8.0 | 8.7 |
| Corey | 7.7 | 6.3 | 6.7 | 6.0 | 6.0 | 8.0 | 7.0 | 6.0 | 12.4 | | |
| Stephanie | 6.7 | 7.7 | 8.0 | 7.3 | 7.3 | 8.3 | 7.0 | 8.7 | | | |
| Katie | 6.7 | 6.0 | 7.7 | 6.7 | 6.3 | 6.0 | 7.0 | | | | |
| Erica | 6.3 | 8.0 | 6.7 | 7.7 | 7.7 | 6.7 | | | | | |
| Briana | 7.7 | 7.0 | 9.3 | 7.3 | 4.3 | | | | | | |
| Kiki | 7.7 | 5.7 | 6.3 | 5.7 | | | | | | | |
| Sarah | 7.3 | 5.7 | 6.3 | | | | | | | | |
| Meredith | 6.3 | 5.0 | | | | | | | | | |
| Caleb | 4.3 | | | | | | | | | | |

== Contestants overall scores ==
Contestant was the winner for that week
Contestant was eliminated
score not shown

Notes:
Week 3 – Katie won 1 point in the dance off and that was added to her overall dance score.
Week 4 – Katie has immunity.
Week 5 – Briana injured her knee and was eliminated but her overall dance score was not shown.
Week 6 – Adamme has immunity.
Week 8 – Stephanie gained 1 pound. Rules state that if a contestant gains weight, they will have a score of 0.0 for their weight score. If that was not the case, her score would have been 8.2 with 0.5% weight gain. Her score instead remained 8.7.
Week 9 – Contestants perform 2 dances, one with their partners and one solo. Dance scores will be added for overall dance score.
Week 10 – Contestants perform 2 dances, scores from both routines will be averaged into one overall dance score.
Week 11 – final two go home for 1 month before finale.

| Contestant | 1 | 2 | 3 | 4 | 5 | 6 | 7 | 8 | 9 | 10 | Finale |
|---|---|---|---|---|---|---|---|---|---|---|---|
| Latoya | 12.5 | 8.4 | 11.8 | 9.9 | 10.4 | 10.7 | 12.0 | 12.4 | 21.9 | 10.8 | 12.9 |
| Adamme | 13.4 | 10.8 | 9.5 | 13.3 | 12.2 | 10.3 | 12.1 | 11.9 | 21.1 | 14.1 | 12.5 |
| Michael | 10.7 | 10.0 | 11.5 | 8.7 | 8.3 | 10.8 | 9.0 | 10.0 | 21.0 | 9.9 | 11.6 |
| Corey | 12.4 | 8.6 | 9.8 | 7.3 | 7.9 | 10.7 | 9.1 | 8.9 | 14.7 | | |
| Stephanie | 12.0 | 11.7 | 11.3 | 8.1 | 9.5 | 9.3 | 9.6 | 8.7 | | | |
| Katie | 10.7 | 8.2 | 11.9 | 7.8 | 8.3 | 9.2 | 8.7 | | | | |
| Erica | 9.7 | 10.9 | 9.8 | 8.4 | 8.9 | 8.5 | | | | | |
| Briana | 12.6 | 9.1 | 11.4 | 8.5 | N/A | | | | | | |
| Kiki | 11.1 | 7.8 | 8.6 | 7.2 | | | | | | | |
| Sarah | 11.8 | 7.2 | 8.0 | | | | | | | | |
| Meredith | 10.4 | 6.9 | | | | | | | | | |
| Caleb | 9.1 | | | | | | | | | | |

== Episode guide season 2 ==
Episode 1: The Final 25 – LA or Bust – 7 June 2010
25 finalists from the LA, Dallas, Chicago, New York City and online auditions come to LA for the final audition.

Episode 2: Let's Get It Started – 14 June 2010
The 12 finalists are paired off into 6 teams for the Dance Off. They meet with Dr. Geller for their physicals, Rachel Beller, their nutritionist and Lee Wall their trainer.

Episode 3: Look at Me – 21 June 2010
Contestants meet their professional dance partners. Three couples have formed, Adamme and Briana, Corey and Kiki, and Michael and Stephanie.

Episode 4: Latin Week – 28 June 2010
Contestants compete in a "Ass-a-thon" doing a salsa routine. Katie wins and earns 1 point to add to her overall dance score.
Contestants pair off and will dance as a quartet with their professional dance partners. The contestants will share 1 dance score.
Adamme is admitted to the hospital: he is severely anaemic due to bleeding from the stomach and must have several transfusions. He only attended 1 dance rehearsal. His professional dance partner visits him at the hospital.

Episode 5: Hip Hop – 5 July 2010
Contestants have to pick partners to have a hip hop battle.
Michael vs Adamme – dance style: house
Stephanie vs Corey – dance style: crank
Briana vs Kiki – dance style: step
Katie dancing solo due to having immunity this week – dance style: tutting
Latoya vs Erica – dance style: jerk

Episode 6: Sum Summatime – 12 July 2010
Dance styles: jazz, hip hop or pop
Contestants host a barbecue.
Nutritionist shows contestants how to build a better salad.
Briana injures her knee. While she does participate in the contest she falls due to her injury and barely finishes her routine. Unfortunately she receives the lowest dance score of the night and is eliminated. Her weight loss is not shown.

Episode 7: Strictly Ballroom – 19 July 2010
Dance Styles:
Adamme – paso doble
Stephanie – jive
Katie – waltz
Erica – tango
Corey – foxtrot
Michael – Viennese waltz
Latoya – tango

Before and After photos shown
Adamme first contestant to have lost more than 50lbs – actual weight lost – 52.1lbs

Episode 8: Prom Week – 26 July 2010
Contestants run a mile with Hyper Wear weighted vests. The weight in the vests equals the amount of weight the contestants have lost.
Contestants will do a jazz pop/funk routine. The routine must contain a jump sequence and each contestant must do a trick.
Guest judge – Joey Fatone of n'Sync
Latoya decides to shadow Adamme during workouts and in the house. Adamme does not like it. He confronts her during dinner and Latoya sheds tears saying she does not feel close to any of the others, that she does not feel the bond of family. Adamme tells her to respect his personal space and not say anything negative in his hearing.

Tricks:
Latoya – front walkover
Stephanie – hitch kick
Katie – triple pirouette
Adamme – Russian leap
Michael – axel turn
Corey – barrel turn

Adamme has lost over 60 lbs
Michael and Corey have both lost over 50 lbs

Episode 9: Temptation City – 2 August 2010
Remaining contestants travel to Las Vegas. No doctor, no trainer, no nutritionist. Staying at Hotel 32 in the Monte Carlo

Dance Style – burlesque and must use a prop
Adamme – nightstick
Michael – blindfold and chair
Stephanie – couch
Latoya – boa
Corey – hat

Entire group also performed a group exhibition dance before performing their partner routines

Episode 10: Hollywood Week – 9 August 2010
Contestants get pampered Hollywood style. The receive acupuncture treatments, organic spray tans, catered meals.
Each contestant must dance in the style they feel they did the poorest.

Dance Styles dance one:
Adamme – salsa
Corey – pop jazz
Michael – jazz funk
Latoya – cha cha

The twist, each contestant must do a solo jazz dance, choreographed by guest judge Travis Wall, second place finisher of So You Think You Can Dance (SYTYCD), season 2.

Episode 11: Final Three – 16 August 2010
The final three contestants will perform 3 dance routines. The first routine will be a group routine with their professional partners. The second routine will be a hip hop style. The third routine will be a technical challenge, the dancers will do a turn pass, a jump pass and work with a prop. Only the second and third routines will be scored and those scores will be averaged into the overall dance score. The final two contestants will then be sent home for one month to live in the real world and hopefully continue to lose weight before they return for the finale.

Props:
Adamme – chairs
Latoya – mirror
Michael – table

Episode 12: Finale part 1 – 23 August 2010
Cast Reunion. It has been 18 weeks since the start of the season. 3 eliminated contestants who have lost the most body weight get a chance to dance to be the third finalist. Michael, Corey and Katie have lost the most body weight. They do a group dance with solos for the chance to be the third finalist. Michael is picked to be the third finalist. The final three will perform 3 dances and have the scores averaged and have a final weigh-in. The final three then perform their first dance routine which is a group dance and will be scored individually. All the finalists receive 10's from judges Danny Teeson and Lisa Ann Walters.

Episode 13: Finale part 2 – 30 August 2010
Show opens with a group dance including Mel B danced to "Spice of Life". Dave Scott is introduced as the guest judge. He was the guest judge on the first episode. Mel B announces that the finalists with dance 2 more routines, the second routine will be jazz-funk and the third routine will be a judges's choice. All 3 routines will be averaged together for the overall dance score. The overall dance score will be added to the percentage of weight lost since the contestants came back from their 5 weeks hiatus at home. Whoever has the highest total score will be the season 2 winner.

2nd routine – jazz-funk
1. Adamme receives 9 + 8 + 9 = 8.7
2. Michael receives 8 + 7 + 7 = 7.3
3. Latoya receives 10 + 10 + 10 = 10.0

3rd routine – judge's choice
1. Adamme – salsa – receives 10 + 10 + 10 = 10
2. Michael – quickstep – receives 8 + 9 + 9 = 8.7
3. Latoya – argentine tango – receives 10 + 10 + 10 = 10

Combined dance scores:
Adamme – 10 + 8.7 +10 = 9.6
Michael – 10 + 7.3 + 8.7 = 8.7
Latoya – 10 + 10 + 10 = 10

Weight loss:
Michael – 5.7lbs which is 2.9% of his body weight
Adamme – 5.7lbs which is 2.9% of his body weight
Latoya – 4.6lbs which is 2.9% of her body weight

Total Scores:
Michael – 8.7 + 2.9 = 11.6
Adamme – 9.6 + 2.9 = 12.5
Latoya – 10.0 + 2.9 = 12.9

Latoya is the season 2 winner.
