= Hot (Mel B album) =

2000 album by Melanie B

Studio album by Melanie B
- Released: 9 October 2000
- Recorded: June 1999 – April 2000
- Genres: R&B; pop
- Length: 44:35
- Label: Virgin
- Producers: Max Beesley; Henry Binns; The Dynamic Duo; Melissa "Missy" Elliott; James "Jimmy Jam" Harris II; Terry Lewis; Fred Jerkins III; Rich Lightning; Teddy Riley; Screwface; Jimmy Singletary; Al West

Melanie B chronology
| Hot (2000) | L.A. State of Mind (2005) |

Singles from Hot
- 1. "Tell Me" Released: 25 September 2000; 2. "Feels So Good" Released: 19 February 2001; 3. "Lullaby" Released: 4 June 2001

Hot is the debut album by English singer-songwriter Melanie B, released on 9 October 2000 by Virgin Records. Produced during the hiatus of her band the Spice Girls, the singer began recording her solo debut album in 1999. Taking her solo work further into the contemporary R&B genre after "I Want You Back", her 1998 collaboration with rapper Missy Elliott, Melanie B consulted a range of American musicians to work with her on material, including Sisqó and Teddy Riley as well as Fred Jerkins III and Jimmy Jam and Terry Lewis, both of whom she was also working with on the Spice Girls' third album, Forever (2000).

The album received mixed reviews from critics and was not as commercially successful as her albums with the Spice Girls or other members' solo albums released around this time. It peaked at number twenty-eight in the United Kingdom and sold over 60,000 copies, receiving a silver certification. The album spawned three singles: "Tell Me", "Feels So Good" and "Lullaby", the first two of which reached the top 5 in the United Kingdom. "I Want You Back" and "Word Up", previously released for soundtracks two years earlier, were included on different versions of the album.

In February 2026, it was announced that Hot would be released on vinyl, for the first time, as part of that year's Record Store Day.

== Promotion ==
The lead single from the album, "Tell Me", produced by Fred Jerkins III, was released on 25 September 2000. It debuted and peaked at number four on the UK Singles Chart, selling 109,000 copies. It also topped the UK R&B Singles Charts and became a top ten hit in the Netherlands. Four months after the album's release, on 19 February 2001, Jimmy Jam & Terry Lewis-produced "Feels So Good" was released as Hot's second single. It helped the album to re-enter the UK Albums Chart and the song peaked and debuted at number five on the UK Singles Chart, selling 142,000 copies, while also becoming the 85th-best-selling single of 2001. The album's third and last single, "Lullaby" was released in June 2001 and peaked at number 13 on the UK Singles Chart, but was unable to make a great impact on album sales, therefore Hot re-entered the Top 200 for only one week.

=== Other songs ===
Apart from its singles, Hot was preceded by a number of standalone singles which were also included on the album. "I Want You Back" was released in September 1998 from the soundtrack to the American biographical drama film Why Do Fools Fall in Love (1998). The song peaked at number-one on the UK singles chart, ultimately selling 226,000 units, and consequently Missy Elliott became the first female rapper to reach number one in the United Kingdom. At the suggestion of her then-husband Jimmy Gulzar, Melanie B covered Cameo's 1986 hit "Word Up" for the soundtrack of the American spy comedy film Austin Powers: The Spy Who Shagged Me (1999). Included on the Japanese version of Hot, it reached number 14 on the UK Singles Chart.

== Critical reception ==
Professional ratings
Review scores
| Source | Rating |
|---|---|
| AllMusic | 2.5/5 stars |
| The Daily Telegraph | 4/5 stars |
| Dotmusic | 2.5/5 stars |
| The Guardian | 3/5 stars |
| MTV Asia | 3/5 stars |
| Sunday Herald | 4/5 stars |

In her review for The Guardian, Caroline Sullivan wrote of Hot: "The ministrations of Missy Elliott, Sisqo and other hotshot Americans make Hot a passable example of commercial soul, and under their tutelage, Ms B's girlish vocals are as funky as they're ever going to be." MTV Asia critic Lennat Mak found that "working with R&B; frontiers like Jimmy Jam, Terry Lewis, Sisqo, and former Spice producer Fred Jerkins, Mel B bares her soul in her no-holds-barred debut [...] This album could certainly be Mel B's manifesto – spicy, loud, outrageous, honest, and very scary indeed."

Rebecca Dien-Johns from Dotmusic found that Hot was "despite its daft title with its mix of R&B, soul, garage and smoochy balladry, in equal parts extremely entertaining, very boring and utterly ridiculous." BBC Music's Nigel Packer wrote that "contrary to its title, the first solo album from Melanie B is a disappointingly lukewarm affair." He found that her "duet with Missy Elliott and her cover of Cameo's "Word Up" promised a sassy and streetwise alternative to her tamer work with the Spice Girls [but] she appears unable to shake off the more commercial leanings of her past, resulting in a collection poised uneasily between breezy bubblegum pop and edgy R 'n' B. In a negative review, NME remarked that it was "hard to overstate just how bad this record is. By spreading her meagre vocal range thinly across a selection of even slimmer songs, Melanie Bore is pouting proof that not even the world’s finest producers can right something so emphatically wrong."

== Commercial performance ==
Hot debuted and peaked at number 28 on the UK Albums Chart in the week of 21 October 2000, with first week sales of 7,500 copies. The album dropped off the chart after three weeks. Four months later, Hot re-entered the chart for two weeks, due to the success of its second single "Feels so Good". It was the second solo debut to be released by a Spice Girls member and would remain the only project not to make it into the top ten. The album also reached number six on the UK R&B Albums Chart. On 20 October 2000, Hot was certified Silver by the British Phonographic Industry (BPI) for shipments figures in excess of 60,000 units.

Following the album's vinyl release on 18 April 2026, Hot reached a new peak of number 3 on the UK R&B Albums Chart.

== Track listing ==
Hot track listing
| No. | Title | Writer(s) | Producer(s) | Length |
|---|---|---|---|---|
| 1. | "Feels So Good" | Melanie Brown; James Harris III; Terry Lewis | Jimmy Jam and Terry Lewis | 5:06 |
| 2. | "Tell Me" | Brown; Fred Jerkins III; LaShawn Daniels; Rodney Jerkins | Jerkins III; LaShawn Daniels^{[a]} | 4:33 |
| 3. | "Hell No" | Mark Andrews | Al West; Daniels^{[a]} | 4:18 |
| 4. | "Lullaby" | Brown; Richard Stannard; Julian Gallagher; Richard Norris | Jerkins III; Daniels^{[a]} | 3:26 |
| 5. | "Hotter" | Andrews | West; Daniels^{[a]} | 3:14 |
| 6. | "Step Inside" | Max Beesley | Beesley; Henry Binns | 3:59 |
| 7. | "ABC 123" | Teddy Riley; Screwface; Karen Anderson | Riley | 3:13 |
| 8. | "I Believe" | Riley; Richard Fauntleroy; Anderson | Riley; Rich Lightning^{[b]} | 4:01 |
| 9. | "I Want You Back" (featuring Missy Elliott) | Melissa Elliott; Gerald Thomas; Donald Holmes | Elliott; The Dynamic Duo^{[b]} | 3:26 |
| 10. | "Pack Your Shit" | Riley; Screwface; Tijuana Frampton; Jimmy Singletary; Jonathan Walker | Riley; Screwface; Singletary^{[b]} | 4:21 |
| 11. | "Feel Me Now" | Brown; Harris III; Lewis | Jam; Lewis | 4:58 |
| Total length: | | | | 44:35 |

Japanese edition track listing
| No. | Title | Writer(s) | Producer(s) | Length |
|---|---|---|---|---|
| 10. | "Word Up" | Larry Blackmon; Tomi Jenkins | Timbaland | 3:51 |
| 11. | "Pack Your Shit" | Riley; Screwface; Frampton; Singletary; Walker | Riley; Screwface; Singletary^{[b]} | 4:21 |
| 12. | "Feel Me Now" | Brown; Harris III; Lewis | Jam; Lewis | 4:58 |
| Total length: | | | | 48:26 |

Notes

- ^{^[a]} signifies vocal producer(s)
- ^{^[b]} signifies co-producer(s)

== Charts ==
Weekly chart performance for Hot
| Chart (2000) | Peak position |
|---|---|
| Australian Albums (ARIA) | 144 |
| European Albums (Music & Media) | 79 |
| German Albums (Offizielle Top 100) | 69 |
| Polish Albums (ZPAV) | 35 |
| Scottish Albums (Official Charts) | 47 |
| UK Albums (Official Charts) | 28 |
| UK R&B Albums (Official Charts) | 6 |

| Chart (2026) | Peak position |
|---|---|
| UK R&B Albums (Official Charts) | 3 |

== Certifications ==
Certifications for Hot
| Region | Certification | Certified units/sales |
|---|---|---|
| United Kingdom (BPI) | Silver | 60,000^{^} |
^{^} Shipments figures based on certification alone.
