= Today (Mel B song) =

2005 single by Melanie Brown

Single by Melanie Brown

from the album L.A. State of Mind
- B-side: "Bad, Bad Girl"; "Music of the Night (Perdido)"
- Released: 13 June 2005
- Length: 3:16
- Label: Amber Café
- Songwriters: Kevin Malpass, Julie Morrison
- Producer: Kevin Malpass

Melanie Brown singles chronology
"Lullaby" (2001)	"Today" (2005)	"For Once in My Life" (2013)

"Today" is a song by British singer-songwriter Melanie Brown, released as the lead and only single of her second studio album, L.A. State of Mind (2005). The song was solely written by Brown and produced by Kevin Malpass. Released on 13 June 2005 in the United Kingdom, it entered and peaked at number 41 on the UK Singles Chart, charting for only two weeks. The music video was directed by Mark McConnell and filmed in Los Angeles, California. To promote the single, Brown performed the song on GMTV.

== Track listings ==
- UK CD1
1. "Today" – 3:16
2. "Bad, Bad Girl" – 3:25
- UK CD2
1. "Today" – 3:16
2. "Music of the Night (Perdido)" – 3:48
3. "Today" (music video)

== Charts ==
Chart performance for "Today"
Chart (2005)	Peak position
Scottish Singles Sales (Official Charts)	38
UK Singles (Official Charts)	41
UK Indie (Official Charts)	7
