= L.A. State of Mind =

2005 album by Melanie Brown

Studio album by Melanie Brown
- Released: 27 June 2005
- Recorded: 2004
- Studio: Los Angeles, California
- Genre: Pop
- Length: 42:47
- Label: Amber Café
- Producer: Kevin Malpass

Melanie Brown chronology
Hot (2000)	L.A. State of Mind (2005)

Singles from L.A. State of Mind
- 1. "Today" Released: 13 June 2005

L.A. State of Mind is the second studio album by the English singer-songwriter Mel B, credited under her full name, Melanie Brown. The only single was "Today", for which Brown completed a two-week promotional tour in the United Kingdom. The single entered and peaked at number forty-one.

== Background and composition ==
"It's a bit piano, acoustic-guitar driven. It's not R&B whatsoever. I did it in my kitchen with my two friends from London – Kevin and Julie. I wanna test it first before I decide anything and see what the reaction is and see how I like performing it, because I've only been there in my kitchen with a microphone singing it.

— Brown about recording the album.

After leaving Virgin Records in 2001, Brown was not interested working in music again. During this time, Brown was dedicated to television and acting – starring the first season of drama series Burn It, presenting the TV show This Is My Moment and recording the films LD 50 Lethal Dose, The Seat Filler, Telling Lies and the documentary Voodoo Princess. In 2004, she debuted on stage in the musical Rent as the role of Mimi Marquez, and this encouraged her return to music. In August, Brown revealed that she was recording her second album, but did not sign with a label. Temporarily, she created her own label, Amber Café, just to release the album.

Whilst recording the album, Brown stated that she did not want hip hop sounds, but instead focused on acoustic music. Brown said L.A. State of Mind was a personal album with introspective themes and based on piano melodies and acoustic guitar sounds. She recorded the songs in her kitchen. She performed some songs at various showcases in the United States before releasing the album to test the public reaction.

== Release ==
L.A. State of Mind was released on 27 June 2005 by Amber Café in United Kingdom. It was released in two formats: as a regular CD and as a limited edition with a 30-minute DVD an in-depth documentary filmed and directed by Mark McConnell, detailing Brown's life in Los Angeles. Ten years later, on 11 December 2015, the album was released in United States and Japan only by Right Recordings with a limited physical edition. On 8 January 2016, the standard edition of L.A. State of Mind was released in Canada by Universal Music.

== Critical reception ==
Professional ratings
Review scores
Source	Rating
AllMusic	1.5/5 stars
The Guardian	3/5 stars

L.A. State of Mind received generally mixed to negative reviews. Jon O'Brien of AllMusic gave it one and a half stars and commented that the album was one of the worst of the decade. He described the songs as having "childlike melodies and dated production [that] are entirely representative of the amateurish nature that encompasses the album". Analyzing the songs, O'Brien commented that "Music of the Night" sounds like a failure and a delayed attempt to sound like Ricky Martin, "Stay in Bed Days" was like someone singing Shania Twain at karaoke and "Bad, Bad Girl", described as the "worst of all", was "an ear-shatteringly bad stab at '80s electro that sounds like it was recorded on a children's Casio keyboard". Bárbara dos Anjos Lima of Abril said the album is "shameful and disastrous".

Caroline Sullivan of The Guardian gave it three stars and commented that the expectation for the album was low, but L.A. State of Mind "isn't the pile of scrappy indifference it should have been". She said that Brown has a "reedy, weakish voice" but that the material on the album "presents it well". She favourably compared "Sweet Pleasure" with "Justify My Love" by Madonna, and compared the title track to works by Sheryl Crow. "Stay in Bed Days" was described as "the only rubbish track"; Sullivan criticized Brown choosing to feature her daughter's vocals on the track. In a positive review, Christopher Rosa for VH1 described the album as having "surprising flavors". He praised her vocal range on the album, calling it "awe-inspiring", and went on to say "her phenomenal voice is center stage throughout."

== Singles ==
"Today" was the only single from the album, released on 13 June 2005 only in United Kingdom. It was released in two different formats, one featured "Bad, Bad Girl" as a B-side and the second included the music clip and "Music of the Night (Perdido)" as a B-side. The song debuted and peaked at number forty-one, selling around 1,000 copies in its first week. The music video was directed by Mark McConnell and filmed in Los Angeles, California Brown performed the single only once – on GMTV on 13 June 2005.

== Commercial performance ==
The album did not reach the top 100 of the UK Albums Chart, but according to the Official Charts Company, it ranked 453 in sales in its first week with only 670 copies sold. In its second week, the album dropped down to number 1581. Overall, the album sold less than 1500 copies.

== Track listing ==
All tracks are written by Melanie Brown, Kevin Malpass, and Julie Morrison; except "Today," written by Kevin Malpass and Julie Morrison.

No.	Title	Length
1.	"Today"	3:16
2.	"Stay in Bed Days"	4:05
3.	"Beautiful Girl"	3:47
4.	"Music of the Night (Perdido)"	3:48
5.	"If I Had My Life Again"	4:41
6.	"In Too Deep"	4:00
7.	"Sweet Pleasure"	3:40
8.	"L.A. State of Mind"	3:44
9.	"Say Say Say"	3:54
10.	"Bad, Bad Girl"	3:25
11.	"Hold On"	3:51
Total length:		42:47

== Release history ==
Release history and formats for L.A. State of Mind
Country	Date	Format	Label
United Kingdom	27 June 2005	CD; CD+DVD; digital download	Amber Café
United States	11 December 2005	CD	Right Recordings
Japan	11 December 2005	CD+DVD	Right Recordings
Canada	8 January 2006	CD	Universal Music
