= Lullaby (Mel B song) =

2001 single by Melanie B

Single by Mel B

from the album Hot
- Released: 4 June 2001
- Length: 3:26
- Label: Virgin
- Songwriters: Melanie Brown; Richard Stannard; Julian Gallagher; Richard Norris
- Producer: Fred Jerkins III

Mel B singles chronology
"Feels So Good" (2001)	"Lullaby" (2001)	"Today" (2005)

"Lullaby" is a song by English singer Melanie B. It was co-written by Melanie B, Richard Stannard, Julian Gallagher, and Richard Norris for her debut solo album, Hot (2000), while production was helmed by Fred Jerkins III. It was released by Virgin Records as the album's final single on 4 June 2001 and peaked at number 13 on the UK Singles Chart. The music video features her daughter Phoenix Chi Gulzar.

== Reception ==
The song earned largely mixed reviews from music critics. Lennat Mak from MTV Asia wrote about the song: "Written about Phoenix's birth and the joy she is bringing, the guitar-y ballad "Lullaby" has a heartfelt touch injected with such sincerity that it reveals a rarely seen side of Mel B: Motherly, affectionate, and loving." NME called the song "a pretty TLC-style ballad." Caroline Sullivan, writing for The Guardian, remarked that "Lullabye" was "one of those lapses into slurpiness, like Oasis's "Little James," that can happen to anyone." Nigel Packer of BBC Music called "Lullaby" a "lightweight feel-good anthem which could have stepped straight from a cereal ad.

== Commercial performance ==
"Lullaby" was released by Virgin Records on 4 June 2001 as the third and final single from Hot. The song debuted and peaked at number 13 on the UK Singles Chart in the week ending 16 June 2001, becoming Melanie B's fifth consecutive top twenty entry on the chart. "Lullaby" also reached number 18 on the Scottish Singles Chart and number 47 on the Irish Singles Chart.

== Music video ==
A music video for "Lullaby" was directed by Andy Orrick and filmed in Morocco on 13 and 14 April 2001. The visuals feature Melanie walking down an alleyway singing and at one point helping a child tie his shoes. The video ends with Melanie walking onto a beach singing the end of the song. Shots of Melanie with her daughter Phoenix Chi are shown throughout the video.

== Track listings ==
UK CD single
No.	Title	Writer(s)	Producer(s)	Length
1.	"Lullaby"	Brown; Stannard; Gallagher; Norris	Jerkins	3:26
2.	"Lullaby" (India-I remix)	Brown; Stannard; Gallagher; Norris	Jerkins; Syze-Up^{[a]}	3:49
3.	"Feels So Good" (Maurice's On the Fly dub)	Brown; James Harris III; Terry Lewis	Jimmy Jam & Terry Lewis; Maurice Joshua^{[a]}	6:40
4.	"Lullaby" (video)			3:25

European CD single
No.	Title	Writer(s)	Producer(s)	Length
1.	"Lullaby"	Melanie Brown; Richard Stannard; Julian Gallagher; Richard Norris	Fred Jerkins III	3:26
2.	"Lullaby" (India-I remix)	Brown; Stannard; Gallagher; Norris	Jerkins; Syze-Up^{[a]}	3:49

Notes

- ^{^[a]} signifies an additional producer

== Charts ==
Weekly chart performance for "Lullaby"
Chart (2001)	Peak position
Europe (Eurochart Hot 100)	57
Ireland (IRMA)	47
Scottish Singles Sales (Official Charts)	18
UK Singles (Official Charts)	13
