= Feels So Good (Mel B song) =

2001 single by Melanie B

Single by Melanie B

from the album Hot
- Released: 19 February 2001
- Studio: The Record Plant (Los Angeles)
- Genre: Pop; R&B
- Length: 4:01 (radio edit); 5:06 (album version)
- Label: Virgin
- Songwriters: Melanie Brown; James Harris III; Terry Lewis
- Producers: James Harris III; Terry Lewis

Melanie B singles chronology
"Tell Me" (2000)	"Feels So Good" (2001)	"Lullaby" (2001)

Music video
- "Feels So Good" on YouTube

"Feels So Good" is a song by English singer Melanie B from her debut solo studio album Hot (2000). It was written by the singer in collaboration with duo Jimmy Jam and Terry Lewis, who also produced the track. The song was released as the album's second single on 19 February 2001, by Virgin Records in the United Kingdom. Its release was seen as an attempt to increase the album's falling sales. "Feels So Good" is a pop and R&B song that lyrically deals with being content in love.

"Feels So Good" received positive reviews from music critics. It also fared well commercially in the United Kingdom, reaching number five on the UK Singles Chart, eventually becoming Melanie B's second best-selling single in the region; the single attained moderate success in Europe. The song's music video was directed by Martin Weisz and was filmed in Los Angeles. "Feels So Good" was performed in some television shows as part of promotion for the single.

== Background and composition ==
In 2000, Spice Girls member Melanie B released her debut solo effort, titled Hot; it debuted at number 28 in the United Kingdom, selling only 7,500 copies in its first week despite the publicity surrounding it, before quickly dropping from the chart completely two weeks later. It was eventually certified Silver by the British Phonographic Industry (BPI), denoting shipments of over 60,000 copies across the region. "Feels So Good" was selected as the second single from Hot, and was seen as an attempt to reverse the album's falling sales. Virgin Records released it on 19 February 2001 in the United Kingdom. Melanie B described the track as "very happy, very uplifting as opposed to the first single which was very controversial". (Note: The lyrics to "Tell Me", the album's lead single, were directed at her former husband, Jimmy Gulzar, whom she had divorced months prior to its release.) She also justified the single's choice, "This time of the year is a bit of a depressing time...and I wanted to bring something out that was uplifting and this song does it for me so hopefully it'll do it for everyone else", while also describing the song, Melanie B wrote about a special affection that was "very ideal in my head, about how a relationship should be."

"Feels So Good" was written by Melanie B in collaboration with Jimmy Jam and Terry Lewis in Minneapolis; Jam and Lewis were also in charge of the music production and all instruments for the track. Lisa Keith did the background vocals, while Alex Richbourg did the drum programming. Recording engineer Steve Hodge recorded it at The Record Plant in Los Angeles, with Xavier Smith as his assistant. Hodge also mixed the track at Larrabee Sound Studios in North California. Musically, "Feels So Good" is a pop and R&B song that lyrically is a "feel-good track about being content in love". According to Dotmusic's Cyd James, the lyrics are about "being joyously head-over-heels without being too slushy and sentimental about it". According to Nigel Packer from BBC Music, the "upbeat" lyrics were "unexpected given Mel's much-publicised marriage break-up" months prior. The song starts with the singer declaring "I'm gonna get all soft and smoocheh" in a "rich and ripe" accent from Leeds, West Yorkshire. Jon O'Brien of Billboard stated that "Mel B ensured that you wouldn't mistake her for anyone else" with her accent. The song also features Melanie B screaming "Yippee!" in the background throughout the song.

== Reception ==
=== Critical ===
"Feels So Good" received generally positive reviews from music critics. According to Nick Levine of Attitude, the track was an "irresistible summer jam", as well as Melanie B's signature hit of her solo career. Lennat Mak from MTV Asia selected it as a "choice cut" from Hot, and commented that the song was a "poppy" track that "Mel B sings with confidence". Heart said the song was the singer's "breeziest track", describing it as a "lush pop singalong". Sarah Dobbs from Digital Spy felt it "definitely falls closer to the pop end of the pop-R'n'B spectrum her solo work tended to fall along, but that's no bad thing." Esther Sadler of Virgin.net described "Feels So Good" as a "pristine pop romp". According to Billboard's Joe O'Brien, the track "left you wishing that Jimmy Jam and Lewis, who produced it, had taken control of" the whole Hot album, as it "evoked the duo's regular muse Janet Jackson at her most carefree."

Cyd Jaymes from Dotmusic called the song a "corker", as well as a "sunshiny, exuberantly happy R&B; style pop which will have you singing from breakfast to bedtime"; he also added that "even the fact that every now and then in the background our Mel can be heard delightedly squealing YIPPEE! does not detract from this fine slice of popular music." Nigel Packer from BBC Music wrote that the track "sets [the album's] the tone ominously", describing it as "a sparky singalong which would probably have worked over three minutes but for some inexplicable reason is stretched out to five." According to NME's staff, "Feels So Good" was "charming", although it was "ruined from the start by the sound of Our Mel from Leeds bleating about getting 'all soft an' smoo-cheh' in fluent Yorkshire". For the staff of Music Week, "it will need to perform very well if it is to revive the fortunes of the parent album Hot."

=== Commercial ===
In the United Kingdom, "Feels So Good" debuted at number five on the UK Singles Chart for the week of 3 March 2001, spending nine weeks on the tally. It also reached number two on the UK Hip Hop/R&B chart, while peaking at number 32 on the UK Dance chart. In total, "Feels So Good" became the 85th best-selling single of 2001 in the region. In June 2017, it was revealed by the Official Charts Company that the single was Melanie B's second biggest selling solo single in the region, with a total of 142,000 copies sold, only behind "I Want You Back" (1998), a collaboration with Missy "Misdemeanor" Elliott. Across Europe, "Feels So Good" attained moderate success. While peaking at number eight in Scotland, it managed to reach the top 10 in Belgium's Flemish region, and peaked at numbers 62 and 42 in Germany and Ireland, respectively. Across the pan-Eurochart Hot 100 Singles, the track peaked at number 25.

== Promotion ==
The accompanying music video was directed by Martin Weisz and was filmed at Larry Flynt's house in Los Angeles. According to the singer, it was the director's idea to have her kissing a man during the video. She commented, "You do feel something because you've got a stranger's lips on your lips but the crew's there so you can't really get off on it!". The video starts with Melanie B driving her car down a road, singing the intro and scenes of a house with a couple kissing. The first chorus starts as the singer gets out of her car. As the song progresses, she walks through the house singing the song with scenes of three couples kissing in different parts of the house each. Then, an unseen blinding light appears, making the women in each couple to knock something over (e.i. a glass of wine, a bowl of doughnuts, a beer bottle). The video ends with Melanie B and her boyfriend (played by Andrew Karelis) kissing on a bed as a bright light flashes over them.

To further promote "Feels So Good", Melanie B performed the track on televised shows and events, such as Live & Kicking, This Morning, CD:UK and The Pepsi Chart Show.

== Track listings ==
- UK and European enhanced CD single
1. "Feels So Good" (radio edit) – 4:01
2. "Feels So Good" (Maurice's Feelin' Good Soul radio mix) – 4:07
3. "Feels So Good" (Blacksmith R&B rub featuring Know ?uestion) – 5:22
4. "Feels So Good" (video) – 4:00
- UK cassette single
1. "Feels So Good" (radio edit) – 4:01
2. "Feels So Good" (Maurice's Feelin' Good Soul radio mix) – 4:07
3. "Feels So Good" (Blacksmith R&B Rub featuring Know ?uestion) – 5:22
- UK 12-inch single

A1. "Feels So Good" (Blacksmith R&B rub featuring Know ?uestion) – 5:22
A2. "Feels So Good" – 5:05
B1. "Feels So Good" (Maurice's Feelin' Good Soul club mix) – 7:33

- European CD single
1. "Feels So Good" (radio edit) – 4:01
2. "Feels So Good" (Maurice's Feelin' Good Soul radio mix) – 4:07
- Australasian CD single
1. "Feels So Good" (radio edit) – 4:01
2. "Feels So Good" (Maurice's Feelin' Good Soul club mix) – 7:36
3. "Tell Me" (Silk's House Workout) – 6:06
4. "Feels So Good" (Blacksmith R&B Rub) featuring Know ?uestion – 5:24
5. "I Want You Back" (MAW remix) – 8:22
6. "Feels So Good" (video) – 4:00

== Credits and personnel ==
Credits and personnel adapted from Hot liner notes.

- Melanie Brown – vocals, songwriting
- James Harris III – songwriting, production, all instruments
- Terry Lewis – songwriting, production, all instruments
- Lisa Keith – background vocals
- Alex Richbourg – drum programming
- Steve Hodge – engineering, mixing
- Xavier Smith – engineering assistant

== Charts ==
=== Weekly charts ===
Weekly chart performance for "Feels So Good"
Chart (2001)	Peak position
Belgium (Ultratip Bubbling Under Flanders)	10
Europe (Eurochart Hot 100)	25
Germany (GfK)	62
Ireland (IRMA)	42
Netherlands (Single Top 100)	85
Scottish Singles Sales (Official Charts)	8
Switzerland (Schweizer Hitparade)	88
UK Singles (Official Charts)	5
UK Dance (Official Charts)	32
UK Hip Hop/R&B (Official Charts)	2

=== Year-end charts ===
Year-end chart performance for "Feels So Good"
Chart (2001)	Position
UK Singles (OCC)	85

== Sales ==
Sales for "Feels So Good"
Region	Certification	Certified units/sales
United Kingdom	—	142,000
