= Tell Me (Mel B song) =

2000 song by Melanie B

Single by Melanie B

from the album Hot
- Released: 25 September 2000
- Recorded: March 2000
- Studio: The Record Plant (Los Angeles)
- Genre: R&B
- Length: 4:33
- Label: Virgin
- Songwriters: Melanie Brown; Fred Jerkins III; LaShawn Daniels
- Producer: Fred Jerkins III

Melanie B singles chronology
"Word Up" (1999)	"Tell Me" (2000)	"Feels So Good" (2001)

Music video
- "Tell Me" on YouTube

"Tell Me" is a song by English singer Melanie B from her debut solo album Hot (2000). It was written by Melanie B in collaboration with LaShawn Daniels and Fred Jerkins III, and produced by the latter. It was released as the lead single from the album in the United Kingdom on 25 September 2000, by Virgin Records. "Tell Me" is an R&B song whose lyrics are directed at the singer's former husband, Jimmy Gulzar. The track received generally positive reviews from music critics, who complimented its production.

"Tell Me" was commercially successful, debuting at its peak position of number four on the UK singles chart, while topping the UK Hip Hop/R&B chart; it has sold a total of 109,000 copies in the region as of June 2017, becoming the singer's third biggest selling solo single. "Tell Me" also peaked at number seven in Scotland and reached the top 20 in Belgium's Flemish and Walloon regions. Nigel Dick directed a music video that depicts Melanie B accompanied by her dancers. To further promote "Tell Me", she performed the track on televised shows and events.

== Background and composition ==
In March 1998, Melanie B began a relationship with Dutch dancer Jimmy Gulzar and married him six months later at a highly publicised wedding ceremony in Little Marlow, Buckinghamshire. As a couple, they had a daughter, Phoenix Chi, born on 19 February 1999. She eventually filed for divorce in 2000, and the divorce was finalised later that year. The singer won custody, and reportedly paid a settlement of £1.25m to Gulzar. Meanwhile, Melanie B worked on her debut solo effort, titled Hot, which she described as "like a documentary of all the things that I've been going through in the last two years". "Tell Me" was the last song to be written and recorded for the album in March 2000. The singer chose it as the lead single as it was "very up-to-date [and] very now for me personally". It was released as in the United Kingdom on 25 September 2000, by Virgin Records. According to David Sinclair in the book Spice Girls Revisited: How The Spice Girls Reinvented Pop, the release was seen as a "fatal mistake" by her record company, as the Spice Girls' third studio album Forever was due the following month.

"Tell Me" was written by Melanie B in collaboration with Fred Jerkins III and LaShawn Daniels; the former was also in charge of the music production and mixing for the track, while the latter did the vocal production. It was recorded by recording engineer Paul Foley at The Record Plant in Los Angeles, while mixing was done by Jerkins and Dexter Simons at Larrabee Sound Studios in North California. Musically, "Tell Me" is an R&B song which features a "background of squelchy keyboards and fractured beats", as well as "slinky beats and Psycho stabs of strings". The lyrics of the song are directed at her former husband Gulzar: "What made you think I would be a fool/I now see through you/And you're the fool… You didn't have no self-esteem/And all you loved was Mel B's money". She explained, "That song's about a relationship… about when a relationship goes wrong. In other words, I'm saying he didn't love me"; however, the singer stated that she did not see "Tell Me" as controversial, as she was a "very honest person and I want to sing things with conviction so I write from the heart". Nigel Packer from the BBC News stated that Melanie B sings in "typically no-nonsense style" on the track. According to Dotmusic's Jackie Flying, the singer referencing herself in the third person on the lyrics was "a sure sign that you've qualified as a fully blown member of the so-famous-they're-bonkers glitterati".

== Reception ==
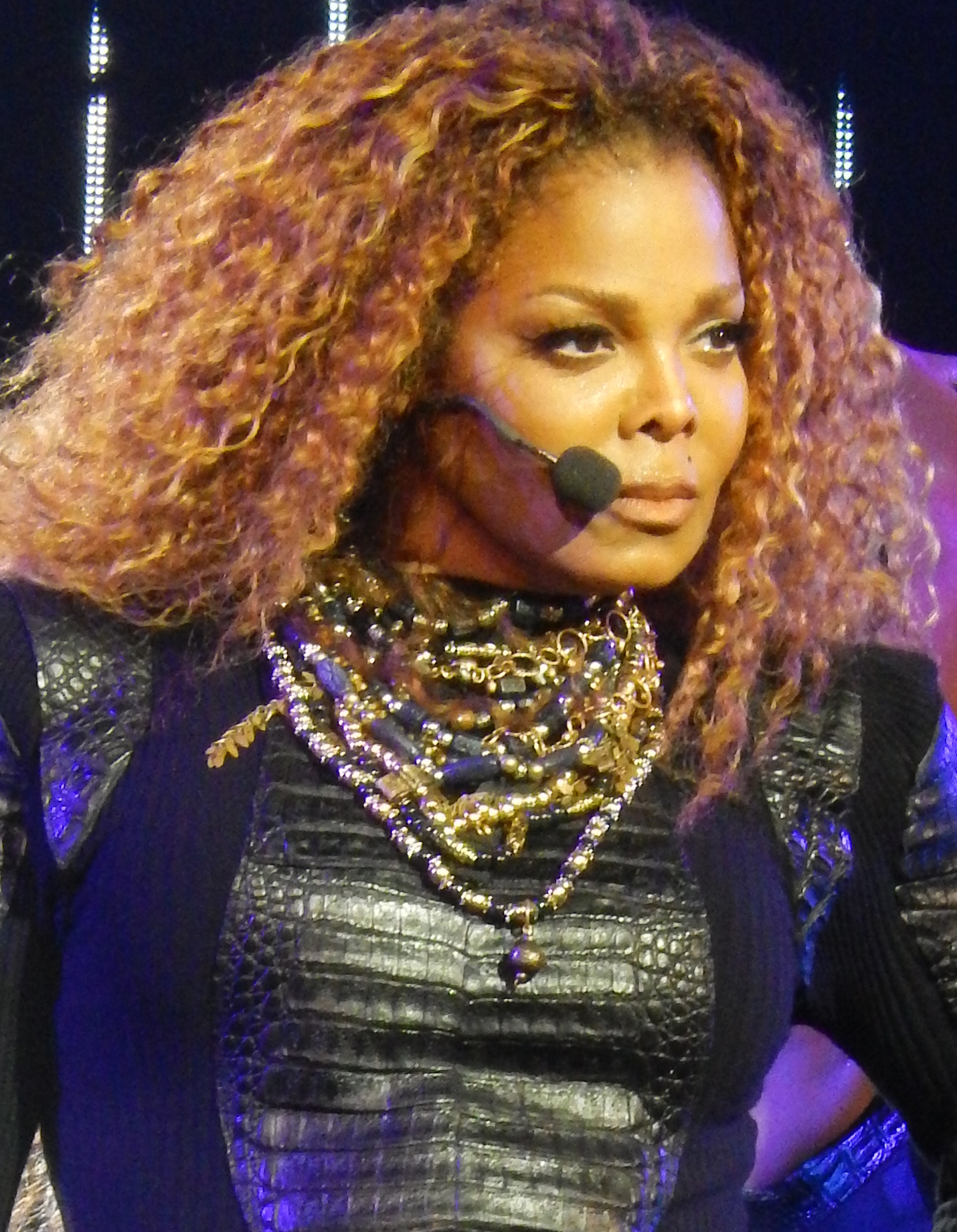
Heart radio staff compared the track to Janet Jackson's (pictured) works

=== Critical ===
"Tell Me" received positive reviews from music critics. According to a reviewer from the Lancashire Telegraph, the track was "loud, proud and upfront", whereas BBC Music's Nigel Packer described it as "vitriolic". For Sarah Dobbs of Digital Spy, it was a "power-reclaiming anthem". Heart wrote, "Scary Spice embraced her inner Janet Jackson with the funky R&B tune." Jackie Flynn of Dotmusic stated that "Mel B is shaping up as the best pop star" of all the Spice Girls as "Tell Me" was "another great single, a sassy piece of spiteful R&B"; she went on to say that "her solo career's proving increasingly classy then even if nothing else about the young lady is." The staff from the Birmingham Evening Mail felt that Jerkins "has brought out a first class vocal performance from Scary Spice on this autobiographical snapshot of her marital woes", whose "a strong beat and choppy instrumental breaks it will keep Spice Girls' fans satisfied until the group's new release". However, on another note, Caroline Sullivan of The Guardian commented that the track "lacks the spite such a song demands".

=== Commercial ===
In the United Kingdom, "Tell Me" debuted at number four on the UK singles chart for the week dated 7 October 2000, spending 11 weeks on the tally; meanwhile, it topped the UK Hip Hop/R&B chart. In June 2017, the Official Charts Company revealed that the single was Melanie B's third biggest–selling solo single in the region, with 109,000 copies sold. Across Europe, "Tell Me" attained moderate success. While peaking at number seven in Scotland, it managed to reach the top 20 in Belgium's both Flemish and Walloon regions, as well as the top 50 in Italy and the Netherlands, and peaked at numbers 98 and 66 in Germany and Switzerland, respectively. Across the pan-Eurochart Hot 100 Singles, the track peaked at number 19. In Australia, the song debuted and peaked at number 43 on 15 October 2000.

== Promotion ==
The music video for "Tell Me" was directed by Nigel Dick and filmed on 10–11 July 2000, at the Littlebrook Power Station in Dartford. According to Melanie B, Dick did not want to describe the song in the video, instead portraying her and her dancers "enjoying [themselves]". A total of 24 dancers auditioned for the video, and she chose her friends from college to participate. The visual starts with Melanie B putting a disc into a CD player. As the music starts, she walks down an alley, where a crowd gathers and they all perform a synchronized dance as the chorus starts. As the video progresses, it shows her in many different settings, and as the song starts to fade, she is seen sitting where the first dance took place staring off-camera. To further promote "Tell Me", Melanie B performed the track on televised shows and events, such as Top of the Pops, and the 2000 TMF Awards.

== Track listings ==
- UK CD1
1. "Tell Me" (Radio Edit) – 3:55
2. "Tell Me" (Soul Central Remix) – 4:20
3. "Tell Me" (Silk's House Workout 7" Remix) – 4:05
4. "Tell Me" (Music video) – 3:54
- UK CD2
1. "Tell Me" (Album Version) – 4:33
2. "Tell Me" (Untouchables Remix) – 4:05
3. "Tell Me" (NDB Remix) – 5:42

== Credits and personnel ==
Credits and personnel adapted from Hot liner notes.

- Melanie Brown – vocals, songwriting
- LaShawn Daniels – songwriting, vocal production
- Fred Jerkins III – songwriting, production, mixing
- Dexter Simons – mixing
- Paul Foley – recording engineer

== Charts ==
=== Weekly charts ===
Weekly chart performance for "Tell Me"
Chart (2000)	Peak position
Australia (ARIA)	43
Belgium (Ultratip Bubbling Under Flanders)	8
Belgium (Ultratip Bubbling Under Wallonia)	15
Europe (European Hot 100 Singles)	19
Germany (GfK)	98
Ireland (IRMA)	22
Italy (FIMI)	50
Netherlands (Dutch Top 40 Tipparade)	2
Netherlands (Single Top 100)	44
Scotland Singles (OCC)	7
Switzerland (Schweizer Hitparade)	66
UK Singles (OCC)	4
UK Hip Hop/R&B (OCC)	1

=== Year-end charts ===
Year-end chart performance for "Tell Me"
Chart (2000)	Position
UK Singles (OCC)	158

== Release history ==
Release dates and formats for "Tell Me"
Region	Date	Format(s)	Label(s)	Ref.
United Kingdom	25 September 2000	CD; cassette	Virgin	
