= For Once in My Life (Mel B song) =

2013 song by Mel B

Single by Mel B
- Released: 13 September 2013
- Genre: Dance-pop
- Length: 3:38
- Label: SBB
- Songwriters: Mel B; Tim Daniel McEwan; Lars Halvor Jensen; Gita Lake; Negin Djafari
- Producer: Deekay

Mel B singles chronology
"Today" (2005)	"For Once in My Life" (2013)

Music video
- "For Once in My Life" on YouTube

"For Once in My Life" is a song by English singer-songwriter Mel B. The song was written by Brown, Tim Daniel McEwan, Lars Halvor Jensen, Gita Lake and Negin Djafari, and produced by Danish production team Deekay. It was released on 19 September 2013 on iTunes by SBB Records. It marked Brown's first release in eight years following 2005's "Today". The single was first announced by Brown on The Ellen DeGeneres Show. The single peaked at No. 2 on the US Billboard Hot Dance Club Songs chart.

== Music video ==
Mel B in a music video scene, stripped from her office uniform.

The music video was released in YouTube through Brown's official YouTube account on 19 September 2013. The music video shows Brown leaving out of her house wearing her office uniform and reading bill letters. Before getting in her car, she throws all the bill letters and decides to strip all of her clothes in the middle of the street. It cuts back to a scene, where Brown is dancing with her girlfriends. As the video progresses, she gets a scissor from a gardener and replaces a model in a photoshoot. Brown then starts cutting her shirt and hair. As she removes her shirt off, she is seen with a shorter hair and a different outfit. She runs through the next house where a house party is happening. She starts dancing with people. Before leaving the house party, she sees a clone of herself and gives her clone a kiss on the lips. After the kiss, she winks in front of the camera and immediately gets out of the house. Jumping and twirling in the middle of the street, Brown makes her last outfit change and starts dancing again. A crowd of people joins to dance with her. Brown gives a peace sign at the end.

A behind-the-scenes footage of making of the music video for "For Once in My Life" was shown in Access Hollywood. The video was filmed on Colonial Street, a backlot set at Universal Studios Hollywood most known for being the set of ABC's Desperate Housewives.

== Promotion and reception ==
The single was first announced by Brown on The Ellen DeGeneres Show. The song gained positive reviews, especially from other stars, with Kim Kardashian, Tinie Tempah, Rita Ora, Paris Hilton, Tony Hawk, Nadine Coyle and Perez Hilton praising the song on Twitter. From October until November 2013, Brown embarked on a promo tour for the single in the United States and Australia. Brown performed the song on The Today Show to promote the single.

== Track listing ==
Digital download

1. "For Once in My Life" – 3:38

Promotional remixes

- Aidan Bega & Eddie Said Radio Edit (3:52)
- Aidan Bega & Eddie Said Remix (6:07)
- Dark Intensity Club Mix (6:34)
- Dark Intensity Radio Vocal Mix (3:58)
- Dave Aude Club Mix (7:08)
- Dave Aude Dub (6:53)
- Dave Aude Instrumental (7:08)
- Dave Aude Mixshow (5:36)
- Dave Aude Radio Edit (3:59)
- DJ Skribble & Lodato Radio Mix (5:04)
- DJ Skribble & Lodato Remix (7:06)
- Eddie Amador Dub (8:03)
- Eddie Amador Full Vocal Remix (7:05)
- Eddie Amador Remix (8:23)
- Hector Fonseca & Isak Salazar Dub (7:54)
- Hector Fonseca Remix (6:32)
- Jamaal Guré Radio Remix (Jamal Gure) (UK) (6:34)
- Jolyon Petch Club Mix (6:33)
- Jolyon Petch Dub (6:33)
- JRMX Club Remix (5:41)
- JRMX Radio Edit (3:44)
- Leonardo GloVibes & D. Montell Remix (6:05)
- Liam Keegan Extended Mix (5:56)
- Liam Keegan Extended Mix Instrumental (5:56)
- Liam Keegan PA Extended Mix (5:56)
- Liam Keegan PA Radio Edit (3:28)
- Liam Keegan Radio Edit (3:28)
- Nikno Instrumental (6:18)
- Nikno Remix (6:14)
- Paul Oakenfold Club Instrumental (4:37)
- Paul Oakenfold Club Remix (4:37)
- Paul Oakenfold Radio Edit (3:03)
- Paul Oakenfold Radio Instrumental (3:03)
- Sidney Samson Instrumental (5:25)
- Sidney Samson Remix (5:25)
- Thin Red Men Club Mix (4:38)
- Thin Red Men Radio Edit (3:44)
- Toy Armada & DJ Grind Club Mix (6:29)
- Toy Armada & DJ Grind Instrumental (6:29)
- Toy Armada & DJ Grind Radio Edit (4:33)
- Ultimix by Paul Goodyear (5:46)
- X-Mix by DJ MichaelAngelo (5:57)
- Wayne G & LFB Anthem Mix (7:38)

== Charts ==
Chart performance for "For Once in My Life"
Chart (2013)	Peak position
UK Indie Chart	30
US Billboard Dance Club Songs	2
