= Fabio D'Andrea =

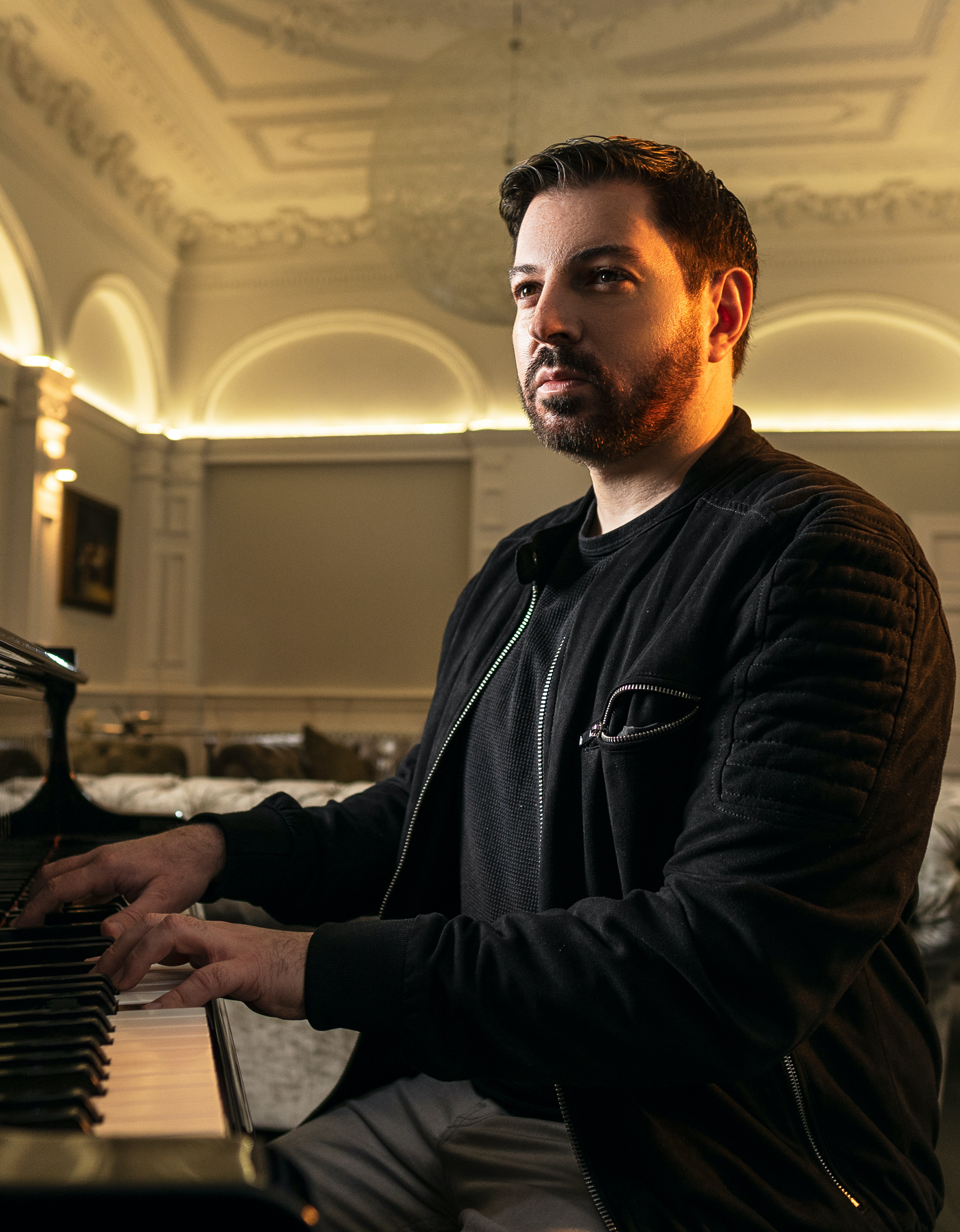
- Fabio D'Andrea in 2019

Background information
- Born: Fabio D'Andrea; 18 January 1980 (age 46)
- Origin: Cambridgeshire, England
- Genres: Neoclassical new-age, minimal, film score contemporary classical, pop, R&B, pop rock, soul, dance-pop, gospel
- Occupations: Composer, musician, singer
- Instruments: Piano, double bass, vocals
- Years active: 2001–present
- Labels: Absolute, Universal Music Group, Integrity
- Website: www.fabiodandrea.com

Fabio D'Andrea (Italian pronunciation: [ˈfaːbjo danˈdreːa]) (born 18 January 1980) is a British Italian pianist, composer, songwriter and producer. He trained at King's College London under the composer George Benjamin.

Though his primary style of composition is classical, he is also known in the music industry for pop collaborations and producing in a number of different genres.

== Early life and education ==
D'Andrea was born in Cambridgeshire. His mother is English, though born and brought up in India, and his Father is Italian, having moved to the UK when he was young.

At age five he began having piano lessons with a local teacher and soon after started to learn to play the violin and double bass. At age ten he joined the Peterborough Cathedral Choir as a chorister and joined the choir on a tour of the United States, providing the opportunity to perform in Disney's Epcot Centre and his first experience of a professional engagement.

He continued his education, studying music at King's College London, specialising in composition. While there he establishing a rich heritage in composition, studying under George Benjamin, who in turn studied under Olivier Messiaen, who studied under Paul Dukas, leaving with both a first-class bachelor's degree in music, and a master's in music.

== Music career ==
=== Career beginnings ===
At the age of 21 D'Andrea had his conductorial debut at the Royal Albert Hall conducting a special vocal arrangement of Intermezzo from Mascagni's Cavalleria rusticana.

While still studying D'Andrea became involved with the contemporary worship of Kensington Temple, vocally leading a band, and headlining events held at numerous venues in London including some at Wembley Arena.

After a commission in 2004 D'Andrea went to Bulgaria to record a series of his orchestral pieces with the Sofia Philharmonic. Forming strong links there he returned numerous times up until 2008 in which time he made a number of recordings with the Bulgarian National Radio Orchestra. Many of these recordings have been used in films and TV adverts, including a long-standing indent campaign between ITV and Toyota in the UK.

In 2010 D'Andrea had a musical he had been working on in partnership with librettist Claire McNicholl performed at the Edinburgh Fringe festival. Named Persephone and based on the Greek legend, the show featured singer Rachel Fabri of the group All Angels in the lead role.

=== Present releases and work ===
D'Andrea released a debut solo piano album Reflection in 2012

In 2012 D'Andrea was asked to be part of the Liberatum Hong Kong International Festival of Culture along with Khalil Fong Pharrell Williams and William Orbit. Soon after he flew to Cannes for the Film Festival where he gave a guest performance for a party held by Fashion TV and Vogue.

In 2013 was asked to be the first person in the UK to give a performance at Silverstone on the Peugeot Pleyer Piano, created by Peugeot's Design Lab team as a one off unique piano.

Soon after he returned to Cannes for the Film Festival to conduct his own orchestra during the de Grisogono party at Hotel Du Cap Eden Roc, hosted by actress Sharon Stone, and attended by Leonardo DiCaprio, Colin Farrell, Paris Hilton, Tyra Banks, Alessandra Ambrosia, and designers Valentino and Robert Cavalli among others.

D'Andrea continued working with the Kensington Temple gospel choir, writing songs and producing two albums, the 2012 album Forever and 2014 album More Than Enough. Both albums were given extensive radio coverage on Premier Radio, the latter becoming a top ten hit in the newly created gospel charts.

D'Andrea turned his attention to film directing, having directed some of the music videos for the album More Than Enough which have been broadcast on TV channels UCB and TBN.

== Ballet commissions and premieres ==
D'Andrea had his debut commission for a ballet production premiered at the Royal Opera House in 2013. The commission by Ballet Black, an associate company of the Royal Ballet, was composed for Royal Ballet dancer and choreographer Ludovic Ondiviela and the orchestral piece, Perpetuum, featured in the dance Dopamine which toured both in the UK and internationally.

D'Andrea has also built up a strong relationship with a number of dancers from the Rambert Dance Company, most notably National Dance Award winner Dane Hurst, composing specific pieces for them to choreograph and dance to during various concerts and tours.

A few Rambert dancers dressed in full kimono joined D'Andrea for a premier of some of his Asian inspired works which took place at St Martins in the Fields in January 2014, alongside solo violinist Satoko Fukuda. Following the concert the pair were both asked to do a small tour of Japan a few months later, resulting in an exclusive performance at the Tokyo Dome.

In 2015 he was asked by choreographer Christopher Marney to create a piece to be performed by the English National Ballet at the Royal Festival Hall.

=== Duo collaboration ===
In 2014 D'Andrea formed a duo with drummer and percussionist Troy Miller, creating an album of orchestral reworkings of the Gershwin songbook, featuring contemporary voices.

The debut performance of this album will take place at the closing night of the 2015 Cheltenham Jazz Festival and is to be broadcast live on Radio 2. The concert will feature critically acclaimed singer Laura Mvula and Grammy winner Gregory Porter as well as the BBC Concert Orchestra. Both D'Andrea and Miller will simultaneously conduct and perform.

The duo have also been asked to headline one evening at the 2015 Henley Festival, joining the line up of artists Jessie J and Lionel Ritichie who each will headline another night. For this concert both Laura Mvula and Gregory Porter will again join in however this concert will be performed by the Philharmonia orchestra, featuring trumpeter Alison Balsom.

== Discography ==
=== Studio albums ===
- Reflection (piano) (2012)
- 24 (piano) (In Progress)

=== EPs ===
- "Relaxing Piano (A Very Merry Christmas)" (2017)
- "Reverie" (2020)

=== Singles ===
- "No Day Shall Erase You" (2020)
- "Something Left to Love" (2020)
