= WinterStorm =

Music festival in Scotland

- Genre: Heavy metal, NWOBHM, hard rock
- Dates: Last Weekend of November
- Locations: Troon, South Ayrshire, Scotland
- Years active: 2016 – present
- Founders: Ian McCaig
- Capacity: 850
- Website: www.winterstorm.co.uk

WinterStorm is a music festival held annually in the seaside town of Troon, South Ayrshire.

== History ==
Since 2016 it has been held in Troon Town Hall, a location that overlooks the beach and the Firth of Clyde. The event is split over two stages, the Main Stage hosts the headline acts in the Concert Hall, it has a capacity of 600 standing plus 250 seated upstairs. The second stage, known as the Sessions Stage, has a capacity of 160 and hosts up and coming bands and artists as well as an acoustic event on the Sunday following WinterStorm; known as After the 'Storm. StormBreakers, a Battle of the Bands type event, has been held to give acts a chance to win a place on the Sessions Stage.

WinterStorm was conceived by Ian McCaig who is also the Festival Director and promoter of South Beach Sessions. South Beach Sessions is an ongoing programme of live music events which have included bands such as Rhino's Revenge, Pat McManus, Big Country, Stiff Little Fingers, Snakecharmer as well as a number of tribute acts.

The volunteer staff that run the event are known as 'StormTroopers. The main stage event is compared by Tom Russell, with Pete K Mally comparing the Sessions Stage.

WinterStorm branded merchandise and catering includes-

- WinterStormer Ayrshire Pie - Brownings the Bakers based in Kilmarnock.
- WinterStormin Ices - Ayrshire Ice Cream makers The Forum Cafe.
- Strathaven Ales WinterStorm Ale Cask Beer.
- Winterstorm stick of rock.

The Arran Mountains (Goat Fell) that can be seen from the Troon venue are the inspiration behind the WinterStorm logo.

Regular features of WinterStorm include-

- The WinterStorm Deckchair - a giant 6-foot deckchair available for bands and festival goers to have their photograph taken on.
- The WinterStorm Beach Clean - volunteers clean Troon Beach on the morning of the second day. For their efforts they receive a goody bag and a wee dram of whisky.

In November 2019, The Temple of the King Bench was unveiled. It was an original design iron-worked bench installed on the beach promenade. It acts as a memorial for lost musicians and absent friends. The dedication was supported by the Troon Blackrock Pipe Band and Doogie White who played an acoustic version of "The Temple of the King" (by Rainbow) - whose lyrics are inscribed on the bench "With just one wave of his strong right hand – he's gone to the Temple of the King".

In 2018, WinterStorm launched a charity single. It is a cover of AC/DC’s "It's A Long Way to the Top" featuring 1st Troon Boys Brigade Pipe Band. Side B has a cover "Bad Motor Scooter" a song by Montrose. Musicians that played on the single were Chris Glen (Sensational Alex Harvey Band), Doogie White (Rainbow and Michael Schenker Group) and Paul Mcmanus (GUN). The organizations to benefit from the single are dementia-based charity Playlist For Life and the See Me project aimed at reducing the stigma of mental health in youths.

At WinterStorm V the Main Stage was officially renamed to the Steve Strange Stage in memory of the Northern Irish music agent, who died on 25 September 2021.

== 2016 - WinterStorm I ==
South Beach Acoustic Sessions Stage
Day 1 – Friday 25 November	Day 2 – Saturday 26 November
Colin Kennedy Band	Audiohaus
Jamie Angus	Scarlett Randall
Mandulu & Hephzibah	2D
Kris Mulholland	Stoney Broke
Lisa Kowalski	Steve Grozier
November Lights	Long Day Living
	Gordon Harrow
	Fallen Arches
	Redwood Ridge

Main Stage
Day 1 – Friday 25 November	Day 2 – Saturday 26 November
FM	Ricky Warwick Fighting Hearts
Toseland	Last In Line
Praying Mantis	Inglorious
Tygers of Pan Tang	The Amorettes
The King Lot	Vega
Concrete Kingdoms	Mason Hill
	Bloodlines
	The Hyena Kill

== 2017 - WinterStorm II ==
Jägermeister Sessions Stage
Friday 24th - Saturday 25 November
Lisa Kowalski
Stone Pony
Upshot
Anna Sweeney
Derek Martin
Jamie Angus
Losing Ground
Ken O’Hara
Matt Scott
Redwood Ridge
Scott Nicholl
Mendualu & Hephzibah

Main Stage
Day 1 – Friday 24 November	Day 2 – Saturday 25 November
Heavy Pettin’	Glen White McManus
Tyketto	The Quireboys
Bernie Marsden	Graham Bonnet Band
Praying Mantis	DARE
Stone Broken	Tygers of Pan Tang
Attica Rage	Mason Hill
Syteria	Rock Goddess
Bigfoot	Massive Wagons
Till Death Do Us Part	The King Lot
	Anchor Lane
	Black King Cobra

== 2018 - WinterStorm III ==
Jägermeister South Beach Sessions Stage
Day 1 – Friday 23 November	Day 2 – Saturday 24 November
Concrete Kingdoms	Black King Cobra
ZANG	Syteria
Reds’ Cool	Burnt Out Wreck
Rising Souls	Terry Brock
Mandulu & Hephzibah	Twin Heart
The Brink	Matt Pearce & The Mutiny
Redwood Ridge	Resin
	Till Death Do Us Part
	Katalina Kicks

Main Stage
Day 1 – Friday 23 November	Day 2 – Saturday 24 November
GUN	Glen White McManus
Magnum	The Dead Daisies
Sin Dogs	Wayward Sons
Oliver/Dawson Saxon	Geoff Tate's Operation Mindcrime
The New Roses	Girlschool
Anchor Lane	Bernie Torme
Quartz	Eden’s Curse
Departed	No Hot Ashes
Tomorrow is Lost	Trucker Diablo
	Kane’d
	Everyday Heroes

After the ‘Storm Acoustic Sessions
Day 3 – Sunday 25 November
Steve Overland
Geoff Tate
Terry Brock

== 2019 - WinterStorm IV ==
Day 1 – Friday 29 November	Day 2 – Saturday 30 November
Ablaze	Mad Haven
Hollowstar	Joanovarc
Gin Annie	Everyday Heroes
Uproar	Dead Man’s Whiskey
Toi	Baleful Creed
Swamp Born Assassins	Tomorrow is Lost
Darkness Divine	IDestroy

Main Stage
Day 1 – Friday 29 November	Day 2 – Saturday 30 November
Skid Row	Glen White McManus
FM	Last in Line
Diamond Head	H.E.A.T.
Myke Gray ft Kim Jennett	Uli Jon Roth
Pete Way Band	Tygers of Pan Tang
Those Damn Crows	Praying Mantis
Grand Slam	The Amorettes
Pat McManus Band	The Brink
Outlaw Orchestra	Burnt Out Wreck
	Control the Storm

After the ‘Storm Acoustic Sessions
Day 3 – Sunday 1 December
Nathan James
Uli Jon Roth
Danny Vaughn

== 2020 - WinterStorm V (Cancelled) ==
WinterStorm V was due to take place on Friday 27th and Saturday 28 November 2020 but was postponed due to the COVID-19 pandemic. The announced lineup at the time of postponement was: -

South Beach Sessions Stage
Friday 27th – Saturday 28 November
Beth Blade
Chemia
Daxx & Roxanne
Empyre
King Creature
Nitroville
Rigid Soul
Scarlet Rebels
She Burns Red
Sons of Liberty
Tantura Vultura
Theia
Wildheart

Main Stage
Friday 27th – Saturday 28 November
Ali Maas & Micky Moody
Collateral
Gin Annie
Glass Tiger
Hardline
Hollowstar
Mason Hill
The New Roses
Vandenberg
Vardis
Weapon UK
Witchfynde

== 2021 - WinterStorm V ==
Jägermeister South Beach Sessions Stage
Day 1 – Friday 26 November	Day 2 – Saturday 27 November
Sons of Liberty	Beth Blade & The Beautiful Disasters
Fallen Mafia	Daxx & Roxanne
Jason Sweeney	Bastette
She Burns Red	EMPYRE
Battalion of Flies	White Raven Down
Rigid Soul	

Main Stage
Day 1 – Friday 26 November	Day 2 – Saturday 27 November
GUN	King King
Inglorious	Hardline
Mason Hill	Tribute to Steve Strange
Cats in Space	Alcatrazz
Geordie	Girlschool
Hollowstar	Anchor Lane
Florence Black	Weapon UK
Bad Actress	Chantelle McGregor
	Collateral
	Gin Annie

After the ‘Storm Acoustic Sessions
Day 3 – Sunday 28 November
Nathan James
The Nimmo Brothers
Toby Jepson

== 2022 - WinterStorm VI ==
Sessions Stage
Day 1 - Friday 25 November	Day 2 - Saturday 26 November
False Hearts	Stay For Tomorrow
Stormchaser	Pete K Mally Stand Up
Novustory	Cassidy Paris Kinstrife
The Reinforcements	Dawn After Dark
North Atlas	The Outfit (with Chris Glen)
New Generation Superstars	Kinstrife
	Wicked Smile

The Steve Strange Main Stage
Day 1 - Friday 25 November	Day 2 - Saturday 26 November
Edge of Forever	Clann an Drumma
Absolva	Sons of Liberty
Daytime TV	Hardwicke Circus
Sari Schorr	Ashen Reach
Kingdom of Madness: Classic Magnum	Rebecca Downes
Blaze Bayley	Marco Mendoza
Scarlet Rebels	Sunstorm
Eclipse	Vardis
	The Treatment
	Crazy Lixx

After the 'Storm Acoustic Sessions
Sunday 27 November
Ronnie Romero
John Corabi
Sandi Thom

After the ‘Storm
Sunday 27 November
Big Country
From The Jam
The Skids

== 2023 - WinterStorm VII - "Legends and Legacies" ==
In a change to the usual Friday and Saturday festival format, and After the 'Storm on Sunday, The Legends and Legacies of WinterStorm features the addition of a Thursday night line-up, and will touch on the best of the past seven years. Bernie Marsden was on the original Saturday line-up, but sadly passed in August 2023. He was replaced by Graham Bonnet and Tyketto.

Sessions Stage
Day 1 - Thursday 23 November	Day 2 - Friday 24 November	Day 3 - Saturday 25 November
Matt Pearce And The Mutiny	Noturnall	The Brink
Sin Dogs	Bastette	Wicked Smile
Bad Actress	The Penetrations	Syteria
Glasgow	Pete K Mally Stand Up	Rigid Soul
	Electric Gypsy	Chantel McGregor Acoustic
		The Blue Lena

The Steve Strange Main Stage
Day 1 - Thursday 23 November	Day 2 - Friday 24 November	Day 3 - Saturday 25 November
Michael Schenker Group	Massive Wagons	Graham Bonnet
The New Roses	Uli Jon Roth	Tyketto
Chez Kane	FM	Praying Mantis
The Pat McManus Band	Focus	Doogie White and Friends
Romeo's Daughter	Tygers of Pan Tang	Ashen Reach
Gin Annie	Paul Di'Anno	Clann An Drumma
	Jim Kirkpatrick	Chantel McGregor
	Lyin Rampant	Trucker Diablo
		Cassidy Paris

After the ‘Storm
Sunday 26 November
Danny Vaughn
The Nimmo Brothers
Jason Sweeney

== See also ==
- Hammerfest
- Hard Rock Hell
- Ramblin' Man Fair
- Download Festival
