= Albannach =

Albannach may refer to:

- from or pertaining to Scotland in the Scots Gaelic language
- Albannach (band), a Scottish band
  - Albannach (album), a 2006 album by the Scottish band
- Admiralty, Trafalgar Square, pub in London which from 2005 to 2014 was a Scottish restaurant called Albannach
