= Charles Mackenzie =

Charles Mackenzie may refer to:

- Charles Mackenzie (diplomat) (1788–1862), Scottish diplomat, writer and journalist
- Charles Mackenzie (bishop) (1825–1862), Church of England bishop of Central Africa
- Charles MacKenzie (merchant) (1832–1900), Ontario merchant and politician
- Charles Mackenzie (Australian politician) (1837–1921), member of the Tasmanian House of Assembly
- Charles Kincaid Mackenzie (1857–1938), Scottish lawyer, judge and cricketer
- Henry Compton (actor) (Charles Mackenzie, 1805–1877), English actor
- Charles Stuart MacKenzie, World War I Scottish soldier, subject of the lament "Sgt. MacKenzie", written and sung by his great-grandson Joseph Kilna Mackenzie

== See also ==
- Charles E. McKenzie (1896–1956), U.S. representative from Louisiana
- Chuck McKenzie, Australian writer of speculative fiction
