= Glasgow (band) =

British heavy metal band

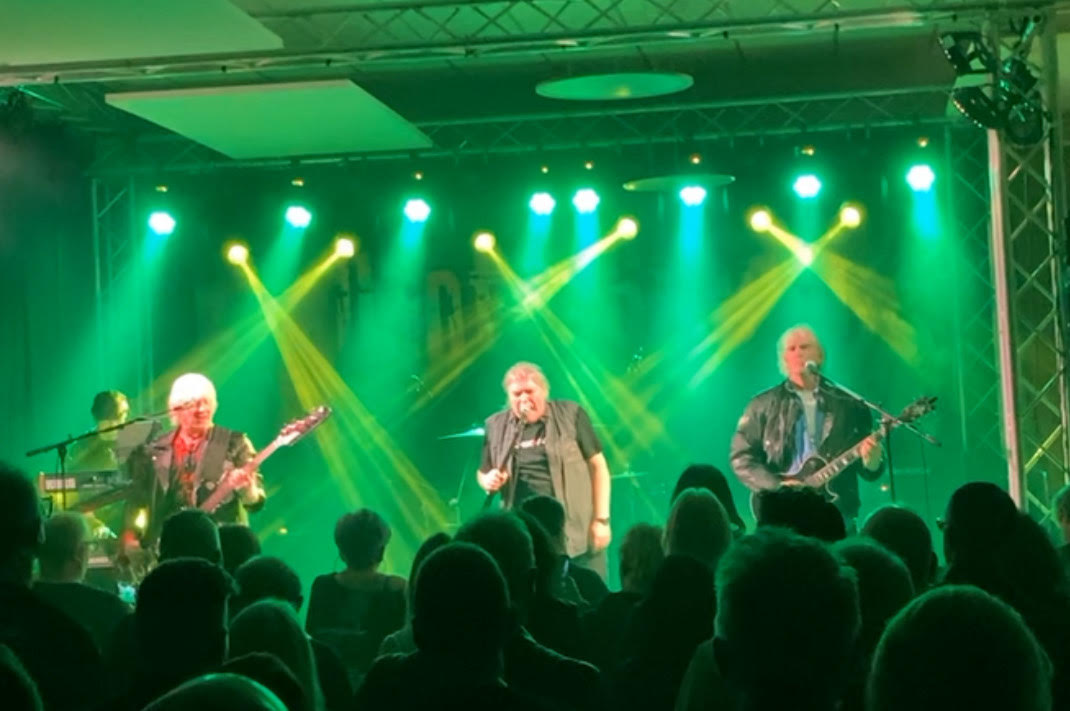
- Glasgow performing at WinterStorm 2023

Background information
- Origin: Glasgow, Scotland
- Genres: New wave of British heavy metal, Heavy metal
- Years active: 1982–1988, 2009, 2021–present
- Label: Neat Records
- Members: Neil Russel (bass); Paul McManus (drums); Archie Dickson (guitar); Mick Boyle (vocals)
- Past members: Joe Kilna (drums) Brian Cartwright (keyboards)

Glasgow is a new wave of British heavy metal band formed in Glasgow, Scotland in 1982. The band released one studio album Zero Four One in 1987, before splitting up in 1988.

== History ==
Glasgow was formed in the city of Glasgow in 1982, taking their band name from their city of origin. They released their first demo, Glasgow, in 1983, followed by the EP Glasgow's Miles Better in 1984. They recorded some material in a London studio after they signed a production deal in August 1986. Glasgow's first full-length LP Zero Four One was released in 1987, before the band parted ways in 1988.

In 2009 Glasgow reformed, without Mick Boyle, as a tribute to their former drummer Joe Kilna who died that year. Glasgow reformed again in 2021. Also in 2021 their full-length album, Zero Four One, was reissued on the Pride & Joy label.

== Band members ==
=== Current members ===
- Neil Russell – bass (1982–1988, 2009, 2021–present)
- Archie Dickson – guitar (1982–1988, 2009, 2021–present)
- Mick Boyle – vocals (1982–1988, 2021–present)
- Paul McManus – drums (1985–1988, 2009, 2021–present)

=== Past members ===
- Joe Kilna – drums (1982–1985; died 2009)

== Discography ==
=== Full length albums ===
- Zero Four One (1987)

=== Extended plays ===
- Glasgow (1983)
- Glasgow's Miles Better (1984)

=== Singles ===
- Stranded (1984)
- Secrets in the Dark (1987)
- Under The Lights (1988)
- Will You Be Mine (1988)
