= I Will (disambiguation) =

"I Will" is a 1968 song by The Beatles.

I Will may also refer to:

== Albums ==
- I Will (F.T. Island album), 2015
- I Will (Mozella album), 2006
- I Will (Zhang Liyin album), 2008

== Songs ==
- "I Will" (Dick Glasser song), 1962
- "I Will" (Do song), 2007
- "I Will" (Jimmy Wayne song), 2008
- "I Will" (Namie Amuro song), 2002
- "I Will", a single by Miz
- "I Will", by Eminem from Music to Be Murdered By, 2020
- "I Will", by Matchbox Twenty from North, 2012
- "I Will", by Mitski from Bury Me at Makeout Creek, 2014
- "I Will", by Paris Bennett from Princess P, 2007
- "I Will", by Radiohead from Hail to the Thief, 2003
- "I Will", by White Lion from Return of the Pride, 2008
- "I Will", by Usher from My Way, 1997
- "I Will", from the 2003 film The Room
- "I Will", by Rock and Hyde from 1987

== Other uses ==
- I Will (film), a 1919 British silent comedy film
- "I Will", the nickname for the flag of Cook County, Illinois
