= Circa B.C. =

Video by Albannach
- Released: 2007
- Venue: Mugdock Castle, Scotland
- Genre: Celtic music, Scottish music
- Length: 48:58
- Language: English, Scottish Gaelic
- Label: Albannach Music
- Producer: Highland Images

Albannach chronology
Eye of the Storm (2007)	Circa B.C. (2007)	The Mighty Nach Live (2008)

Circa B.C. is a DVD released by the Scottish band Albannach in 2007. The DVD features footage from live concerts and band interviews; it was mostly recorded at Mugdock Castle in Scotland.

== Track listing ==
Track number	Track name	Length	Vocalist
1	Intro	1:27	David Ross
2	"Burlin"	3:56	none
3	Gàidhlig spoken word	1:10	none
4	"Ancestors"	2:37	Jacquie Holland
5	Interview with Jacquie	1:10	Jacquie Holland
6	Comments	0:44	David Ross
7	"Hooligan's Holiday"	3:46	none
8	Interview with David Ross	0:59	David Ross
9	Gàidhlig solo	2:42	none
10	"Claymores"	4:18	Jamesie Johnson
11	Interview with Jamesie	3:56	Jamesie Johnson
12	"In Bed with Quincy"	4:11	none
13	Interview with Kyle	3:01	Kyle Gray
14	"Tweedle Dee"	4:35	none
15	Interview with Aya	2:54	Aya Thorne
16	"The Gael"	4:56	none
17	Audience comments & credits	2:27	none

== Credits ==
- Jamesie Johnston – Bass Drum, Vocals, Bodhrán
- Donnie MacNeill – Bagpipes, Drums
- Jacquie Holland – Drums, Percussion, Vocals
- Kyle Gray – Lead Drums
- Aya Thorne – Bodhrán, Percussion
- Davey 'Ramone' Morrison – Bodhrán, Vocals, Whistles
