= James and Tom Martin =

James and Tom Martin

James David Martin and Thomas Richard Martin (identical twins born 2 December 1977), are English musicians and songwriters. Thomas (Tom) plays guitar and James plays keyboards. As well as playing in several bands, they have co-written songs which have charted for other recording artists such as Do and Khymera.

== Musical career ==
Tom and James were born in York, England. They started learning the guitar at the age of 15, after playing truant from school and watching Van Halen videos on MTV. Fascinated by pop culture and the escape from real life, an obsession with music began. With Tom favouring the guitar, James took up the keyboard as this would be more ideal for a band situation. The first significant band the twins put together was in 1998 and called Sugartown. Sugartown passed through a variety of incarnations, finally disbanding in 2003 when Alistair Griffin left the band to enter BBC's Fame Academy and came runner up to Alex Parks.

=== Kryah ===
In 2004, the twins assembled a band named Kryah with long-term friend Pete Lauda, Nottingham drummer Daniel (Dan) Chantrey and Birmingham vocalist Scott Dean. The band toured the country through 2004/05 with a high point playing The London Astoria. A three track EP was recorded, (15 March / Going blind / No warning) at the Dairy Studios in Brixton and mastered at Abbey Road. The EP was co-produced by Ian Brown songwriter Marc Lane. The band broke up in 2006, vocalist Scott Dean leaving to pursue a solo career.

Shortly after the demise of Kryah, Tom and James hooked up again in 2006 with Alistair Griffin, as the founding members of Alistair's new band "Albion",(both leaving after the initial few months to form The Station Club), and also began writing songs for his follow up album to 2004'S "Bring It On". Some of these songs featured with the second line-up of "Albion" until "Albion" Split in 2007.

=== The Station Club ===
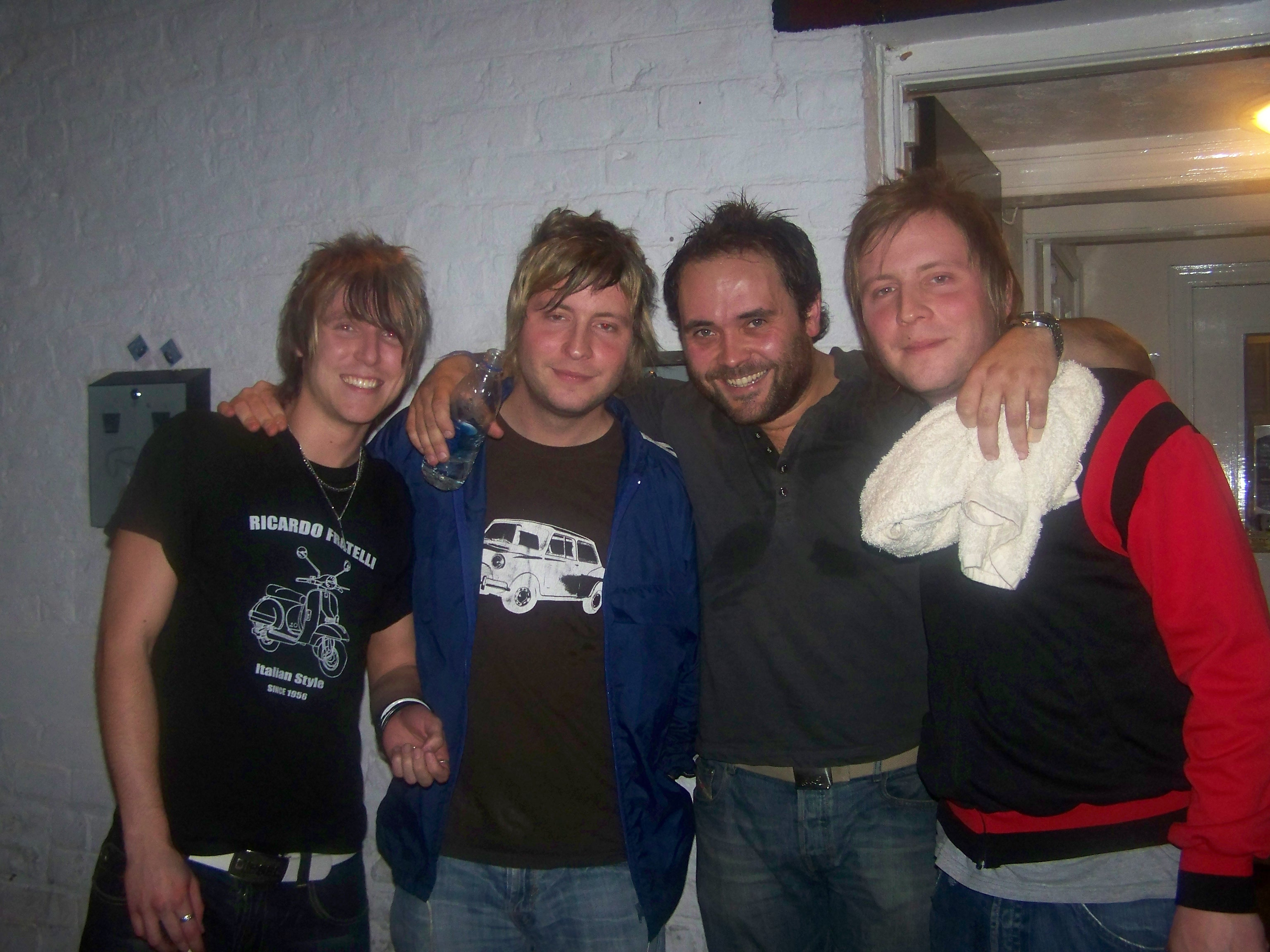
The Station Club line up with Tom Martin (second L) and James Martin (R)

In September 2006, The Station Club was formed. The band was originally a three piece and featured singer/songwriter Mike Wilson, Tom on bass and James on keys, with Adam Swales joining the trio on drums. The band performed their first gig on 16 March 2007 at Fibbers in York. In June 2007 Adam left the band (after their first three live performances) and was quickly replaced by ex-Kryah drummer Dan Chantrey. After three years together, singer Mike Wilson left the band, citing personal reasons. Without a singer the rest of the band decided to take an indefinite sabbatical. Mike Wilson still occasionally writes songs with the twins.

=== VEGA ===
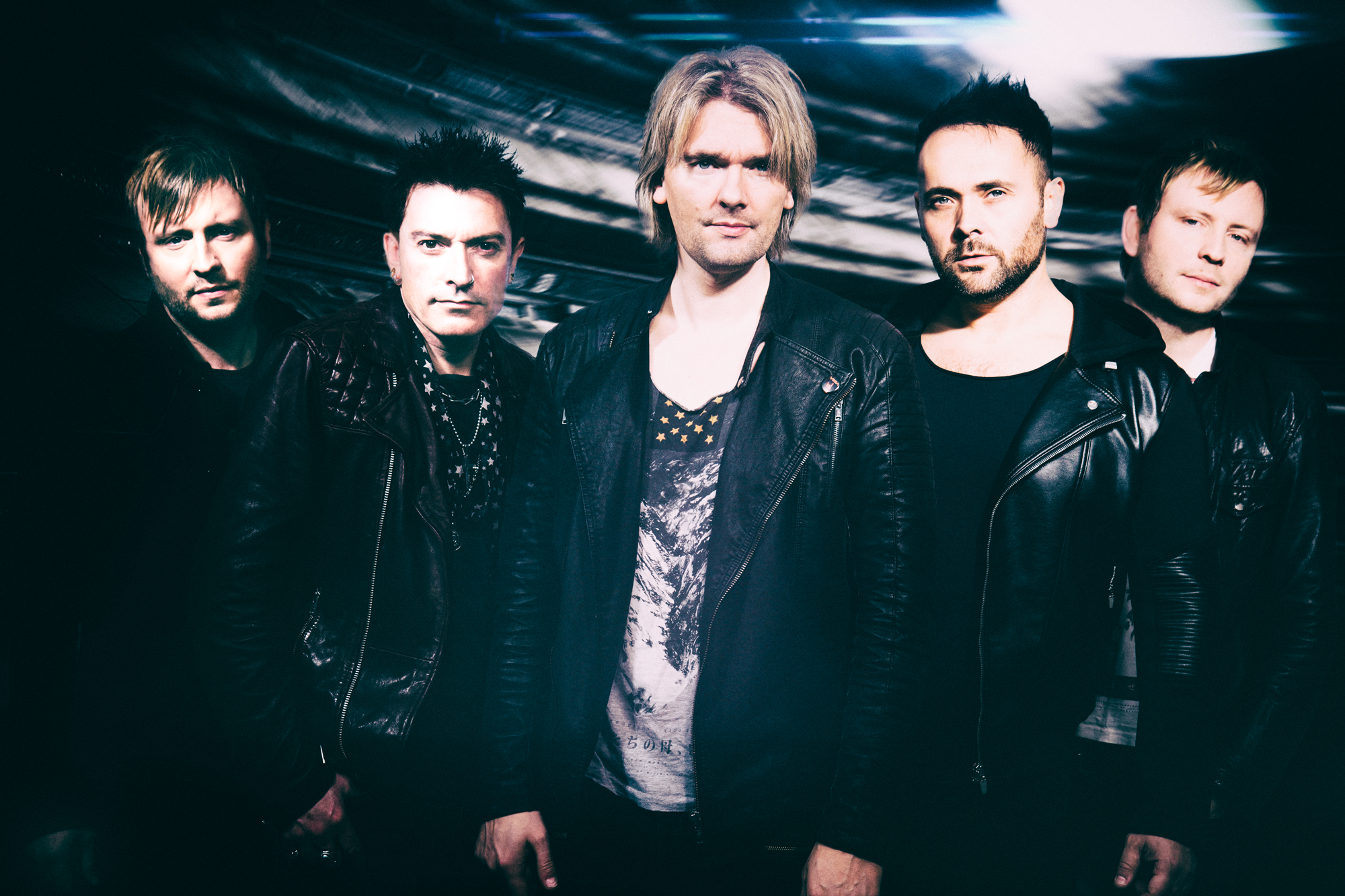
James (far R) and Tom Martin (far L) are founder members of VEGA; image circa 2016

They are currently members of melodic rock/AOR band VEGA. VEGA were formed following a meeting between the twins, Nick Workman and Dan Chantry at the Z Rock Festival at JBs in Dudley, on 29/30 May 2009. VEGA has released five studio albums to date:

- Kiss of Life (2010) Frontiers
- What the Hell (2013) Spinefarm Records/Ninetone
- Stereo Messiah (2014) Frontiers
- Who We Are (2016) Frontiers
- Only Human (2018) Frontiers

== Songwriting ==
During 2002, the twins formed a songwriting team with Alistair Griffin. Writing and producing for Dutch dance star "Do",(Dominique van Hulst), the most notable collaboration was a ballad called Angel by My Side which featured on her 2004 album "Do" which reached No. 3 in the Netherlands album charts. The single charted top 10 in The Dutch National Chart and also featured as the title track for Joan Collins film "Ellis in Glamourland". James and Tom came runner up in Song of the Year on Melodic Rock's Melrock Awards 2006 with "Million Miles" written for House of Lords.

To date, and excluding VEGA, the twins have had around 100 of their songs recorded by rock acts around the world including House of Lords, Danger Danger vocalist Ted Poley, Tommy Funderburk, Khymera and Sunstorm.

In April 2010, the twins signed a publishing deal with Chrysalis and are now writing songs for artists signed to the label.

== Songs written by James and Tom Martin ==
Presented as Song title: Band/Artist – Album title. Not in chronological order.

- Reaching Out: Bel's Boys – People Lets Go (co written with Alistair Griffin and Chris and Tony Griffiths)
- Angel by My Side: Do – Do (co written with Alistair Griffin)
- Alone / Let It Burn / All That I Have / Tomorrow Never Comes / Fields of Fire / Give in to The World / All Is Gone: Khymera – A New Promise
- ALL TRACKS: Khymera – The Greatest Wonder
- To Say You Love Me: Tommy Funderburk – Anything for You
- Million Miles / Ghost of Time: House of Lords – World Upside Down
- If I Cant Change Your Heart / Going Blind / Waiting Line / Where It Ends: Ted Poley – Smile (written or co-written)
- If It's Not Love / Listen To Your Heart / 21st Century / Days of Hunger / One More Night in Heaven: From The Inside (featuring Danny Vaughn) – Visions
- Divided/Don't Give Up / The Spirit Inside / House of Dreams: Sunstorm (Joe Lyn Turner) – House of Dreams
- River of Love / As I Live And Breathe: Issa's – Sign of Angels (co written with Nick Workman)
- Into The Night / This City / First Signal: First Signal ft Harry Hess – First Signal
- Tonight Tonight / Wait For You: Los Angeles – Neverland
- Wings of Love / Powerless / Firefight / Dancing to a Broken Heartbeat: Find Me – Wings of Love
- All I Am / The Silence: Sunstorm (Joe Lynn Turner) – Emotional Fire
- Someone Beautiful: David Reece – Compromise
- The Storm / Invincible / We're on Fire: Issa – The Storm
- ALL TRACKS: Issa – Crossfire
- ALL TRACKS: Ted Poley – Beyond The Fade
- You Won't See Me Cryin' / Tokyo Nites: Ted Poley – Greatest Bits
- Second Chance / Rescue Me / Leave It All Behind: Glamour of the Kill – Savages
- Silent Suicide / Save This Day: Alistair Griffin – Albion Sky
- Save This Day: Alistair Griffin – From Nowhere
- Best of Me: Blood Red Saints – Speedway
- Midnight Memories / Face To Face: Find Me – Dark Angel
- Livin' My Life on the Dancefloor: Holly Hagan
- When We Were Young: Tony Mills – Street of Chance
- I See The Light: Raintimes – Raintimes
- ALL TRACKS: VEGA – Kiss of Life (co written with Nick Workman)
- ALL TRACKS: VEGA – What the Hell (co written with Nick Workman)
- ALL TRACKS (except 10X Bigger Than Love): VEGA – Stereo Messiah (co written with Nick Workman)
- ALL TRACKS: VEGA – Who We Are (co written with Nick Workman)
- ALL TRACKS: VEGA – Only Human (co written with Nick Workman)

== Gallery ==
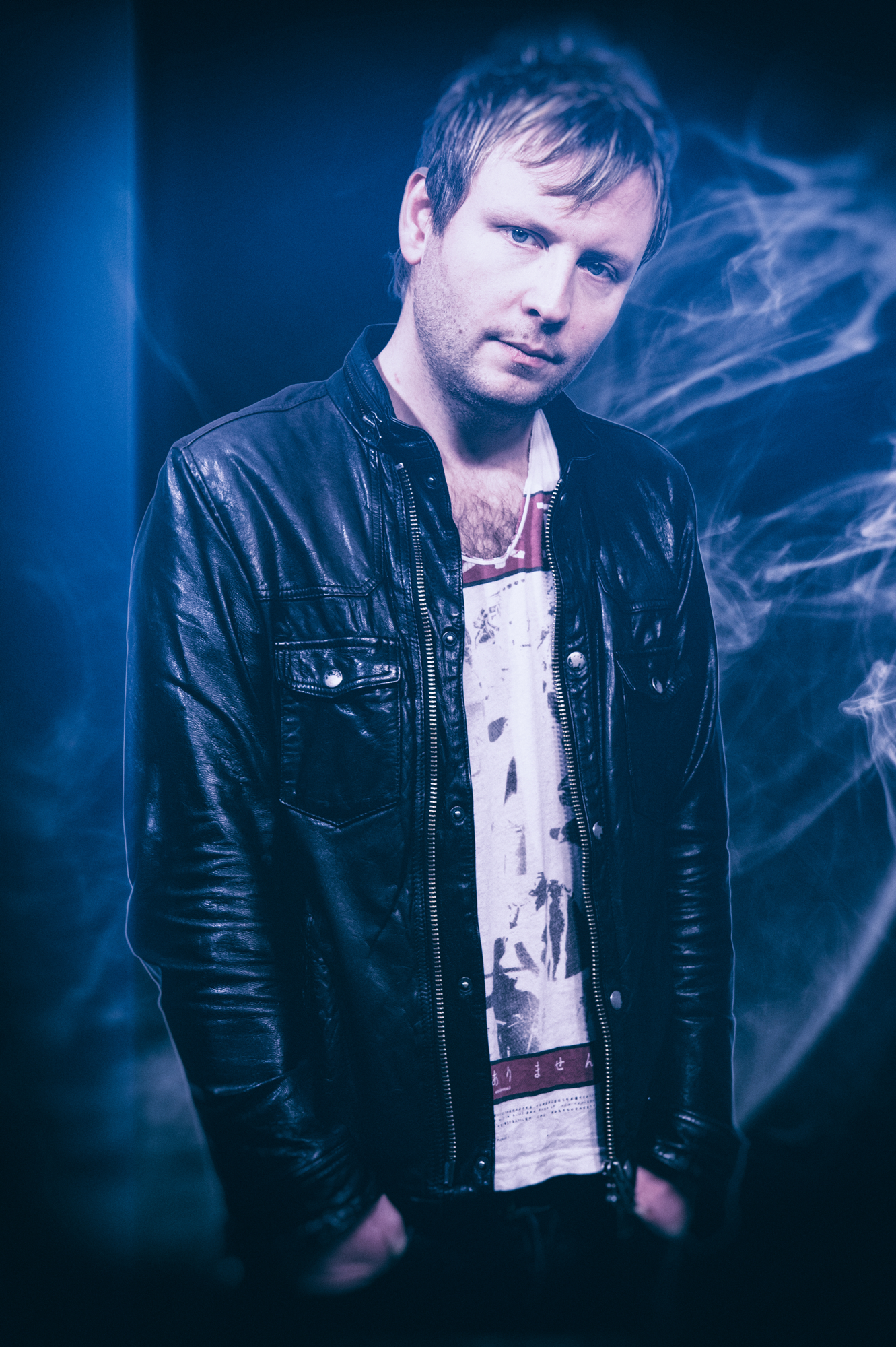
James Martin (circa 2016)

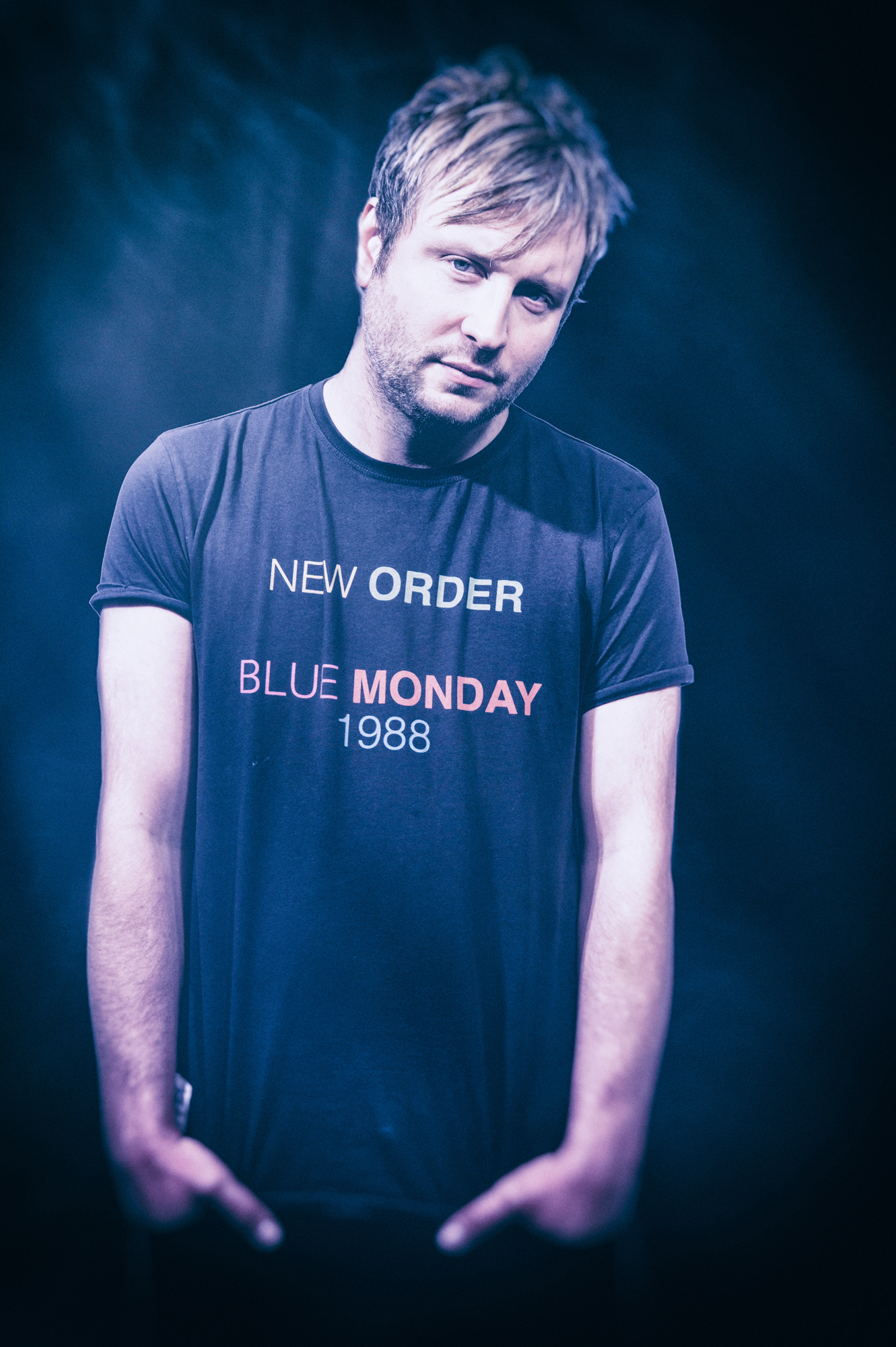
Tom Martin (circa 2016)
