= Follow Me (Melanie C song) =

1999 song by Melanie C

Song by Melanie C

from the album Northern Star (Japanese edition)
- Released: 14 October 1999
- Recorded: 1999
- Genre: Electronica; trip hop
- Length: 4:47
- Label: Virgin
- Songwriters: Melanie C; Billy Steinberg; Bryan Adams
- Producer: Marius de Vries

"Follow Me" is a song by English singer Melanie C. Written by Melanie C, Billy Steinberg and Bryan Adams, it was originally recorded by Melanie C and first released as a bonus track on the Japanese edition of Northern Star. It also appeared as a B-side on the single for the song of the same name.

== Do version ==
"Follow Me"

Single by Do

from the album Follow Me
- Released: March 30, 2006
- Genre: Pop; smooth jazz
- Length: 4:01
- Label: Sony/BMG
- Songwriters: Melanie C; Billy Steinberg; Bryan Adams

Do singles chronology
"Angel by My Side" (2004)	"Follow Me" (2006)	"Beautiful Thing" (2006)

"Follow Me" was covered by Dutch pop singer Do for her second album Follow Me, and was initially released on March 30, 2006 as the first single from the album. The song was supposedly given to Do by co-writer Bryan Adams, as they have met each other several times after Do covered Adams's song "Heaven".

=== Track listing ===
CD single

1. "Follow Me"
2. "Follow Me" (piano mix)

=== Video ===
The video for "Follow Me" was shot in the Netherlands. The two locations were on a long road with several trees and the beach. Do is sitting in a car and singing the song. The video received little airtime on TMF, a Dutch music network.

=== Charts ===
Chart (2006)	Peak position
Netherlands (Dutch Top 40)	39
Netherlands (Single Top 100)	18
