= Mason Hill =

Mason Hill may refer to:

- Mason Hill (Hamilton County, New York), a summit located in the Adirondack Mountains of New York
- Mason Hill (geologist), American geologist
- Mason Hill (band), a Scottish hard rock band
