= David R. Ross =

Scottish author and historian (1958–2010)

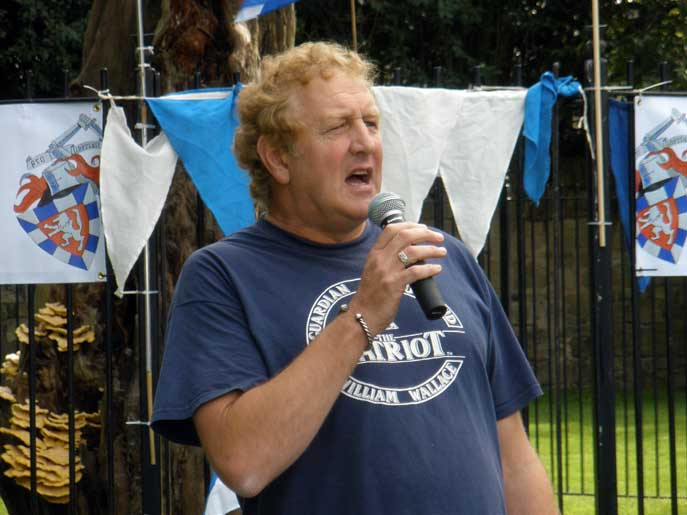
- David R. Ross speaks at the Wallace Memorial Day in Elderslie
- Born: David Robertson Ross; 28 February 1958; Giffnock, East Renfrewshire, Scotland
- Died: 2 January 2010 (aged 51); East Kilbride, South Lanarkshire, Scotland
- Occupations: Historian, travel writer
- Writing career
- Genres: Non-fiction, History, Travel literature
- Notable works: On the Trail of William Wallace; The Black Douglas; For Freedom
- Website: davidrross.scot

David Robertson Ross (28 February 1958 – 2 January 2010) was a Scottish author and historian. He published eight books, most of them mixing elements of Scottish history and travel literature.

He was for many years, until his death, the elected convenor of The Society of William Wallace, an association dedicated to studying and commemorating the life and the personality of William Wallace.

In 2005, for the 700th anniversary of Wallace's capture and subsequent execution, Ross undertook a 450-mile walk in Wallace's honour.

He was a strong supporter of Scottish independence.

== Personal life ==
David Robertson Ross was born on 28 February 1958 in Giffnock, East Renfrewshire. At the age of 5 his family moved to East Kilbride (South Lanarkshire), where he attended Halfmerk Primary School and East Kilbride High, which he left in 1974 with six "O" levels.

At the age of about 15, he became interested in the novels of Nigel Tranter, that inspired him to grow an interest in the history of Scotland, as he realised that the history curriculum in British schools was told from an England-centric perspective that ignored (or nearly so) the individual histories of the other countries and regions forming the United Kingdom. At 17, with his motorcycle, he started visiting the locations of the main events of Scottish history - all this while working in the music industry.

David R. Ross was twice divorced and had a daughter, born in 1987.

== Death ==
Ross died on 2 January 2010 in his home in East Kilbride due to a heart attack.

== Books ==
In the mid-1990s, during a lecture at the University of Glasgow that Ross was attending, Dr. Elspeth King mentioned that a book listing all the sites in Scotland related to the life of Sir William Wallace had never been published; this inspired Ross to write On the Trail of William Wallace, that was published in 1999 by the Edinburgh-based Luath Press.

It was followed by On the Trail of Robert the Bruce, written with the same style - a list of all the sites related to the life of the man who became King Robert I of Scotland as visited by Ross on his motorcycle.

The third book in the "on the trail of" series was On the Trail of Bonnie Prince Charlie, published in 2001.

The fourth and last book in the series was On the Trail of Scotland's History, published in 2008.

Outwith the "on the trail of" series - but still linked to Scottish history and places - Ross published A Passion for Scotland in 2003, a generic (but deeply heart-felt) history of the country; Desire Lines: A Journey Around Scotland and Through Her History (2004), in which Ross guides the reader "off the beaten path" and to the less renowned corners of Scotland; For Freedom: The Last Days of William Wallace (2007) in which he recounts the last week in the life of the hero, from his capture to his execution, and the repercussions of those events in history, and James the Good: The Black Douglas, dedicated to the story of the Scottish hero and soldier, in 2008.

At the time of his death Ross was working on a book about the role of women in Scottish history, which might be completed by his daughter Kimberley.

== The Society of William Wallace ==
David R. Ross was, until the time of his death, the elected convener of The Society of William Wallace, a non-political organisation aimed to uphold the memory of the Scottish folk hero. He was a key speaker at the yearly events organised by the society, specifically the William Wallace Memorial Days held in Elderslie (allegedly Wallace's birthplace) and in Robroyston, where Wallace was captured.

== Walk for Wallace ==
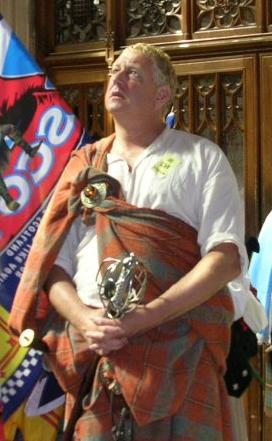
David R. Ross in Westminster on the day on the William Wallace Memorial Service

In 2005, to commemorate the 700th anniversary of the capture and subsequent execution of William Wallace, Ross undertook a 450-mile solo march along the path most likely taken by Wallace from the location in which he was captured to London where he was hanged, drawn and quartered.

He left Robroyston (now a suburb of Glasgow) on 3 August 2005, the anniversary of the date in which Wallace was taken by John de Menteith, after the yearly function organised by The Society of William Wallace to reach London on the evening of the 22nd of the same month - the same date in which Wallace entered the English capital city. His only support was a van in which he slept and took his meals.

His walk and the subsequent memorial service are narrated in the DVD Walk for Wallace and are referred to in his book For Freedom.

=== William Wallace memorial service ===
As William Wallace never received a funeral or a proper burial (as was then the custom for those accused of high treason), David R. Ross and The Society of William Wallace organised, on 23 August 2005 (the 700th anniversary of Wallace's execution), a full memorial function to commemorate the life of the Scottish hero.

Ross, who had reached London from Robroyston on foot the previous evening, gave an opening speech in Westminster, in the same room in which Wallace was summarily tried and condemned to death under accusation of high treason, before leading a six-mile march to Smithfield where, near the church of St. Bartholomew, Wallace had been executed.

Under the plaque commemorating Wallace, Ross gave one more speech before a short exhibition by the band Clann An Drumma.

Inside St. Bartolomew church, then, a full memorial service was held before an empty coffin symbolically holding Wallace's spirit. Short speeches were given by the same David R. Ross, the then-leader of the Scottish National Party Alex Salmond and historian Fiona Watson, with Ronnie Browne of The Corries performing a version of Flower of Scotland and Ted Christopher playing Coming Home, a song he had composed specifically for the occasion.

All those present were then invited to leave a memento of some kind inside the coffin, that was later brought back to Scotland and laid to rest in Lanark, in the St. Kentigern church where allegedly Wallace got married.

=== Campaign for the return of the Wallace safe conduct letter ===
David R. Ross was also at the front in the successful campaign to have a safe conduct letter that had been issued to Wallace by King Philip IV of France in order to allow him safe passage in order for him to meet the Pope, returned to Scotland.

This letter was eventually returned to Scotland on 12 January 2012 and will be on display to the people of Scotland at a free exhibition which ran from 10 to 31 August at the Scottish Parliament in Edinburgh.

== Tributes ==
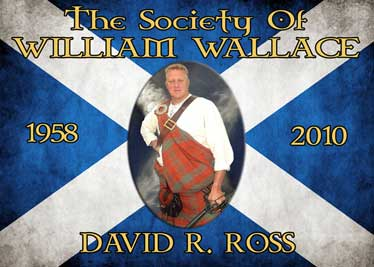
The 2010 flag of the Society of William Wallace

After David R. Ross's death, The Society for William Wallace decided to include his image in its new flag in permanent memory. This flag was displayed for the first time on 21 August 2010, at the William Wallace Memorial Day in Elderslie.

A group of members of The Society of William Wallace - USA, during a visit to Scotland, erected a cairn in his memory near Loch Lochy.

The Argentinian folk metal band Skiltron released the tribute song On the Trail of David Ross on their 2013 album Into the Battleground. The song makes specific mention of the Walk for Wallace.

Other tributes to him can be found on the websites of crime writer Lin Anderson and of the band Albannach. An official tribute was also paid by Alex Salmond, First Minister of Scotland.
