= Follow Me (Do album) =

Studio album by Do
- Released: June 19, 2006
- Genre: Pop, Jazz, Gospel, country
- Length: 51:51
- Label: Sony/BMG
- Producer: Stephan Geuzebroek, Frans Hendriks

Do chronology
Do (2004)	Follow Me (2006)	Zingen in het Donker (2010)

Singles from Follow Me
- 1. "Follow Me" Released: March 30, 2006; 2. "Beautiful Thing" Released: June 6, 2006; 3. "Sending Me Roses" Released: October 7, 2006; 4. "I Will" Released: February 2, 2007

Follow Me is the second studio album by Dutch singer Do (Dominique van Hulst). It was released on 19 June 2006 by Sony/BMG in the Netherlands.

The album debuted at number 8 on the Dutch Mega Top 100 albums chart upon its release.

== Album information ==
After her successful debut album Do she began working on her second album with her best friend and musical partner Glenn Corneille. They made a basis for the next album but Glenn Corneille died in a car disaster. However, do need to go on, so she started again where she left off.

The album contains 12 songs. Do co-write 3 songs; Love Me, Tune Into Me, and When Everything is Gone. It features several different music genres, such as Pop, Jazz, Gospel, and Country.

== Track listing ==
#	CD Title
1.	"Sending Me Roses"
2.	"Beautiful Thing"
3.	"'We Could"
4.	"Follow Me"
5.	"Under A Spell"
6.	"I Will"
7.	"Take It Like A Man"
8.	"Ordinary People"
9.	"Love Me"
10.	"Tune Into Me"
11.	"When Everything Is Gone"
12.	"I Still Believe In You"

== Chart positions ==
Chart (2006)	Peak position
Dutch Albums (Album Top 100)	8
