= The Mighty Nach Live =

Live album by Albannach
- Released: 2008
- Genre: Celtic battle music
- Label: Albannach Music
- Producer: Mick MacNeil

Albannach chronology
Circa B.C. (2007)	The Mighty Nach Live (2008)

The Mighty Nach Live is the third audio release of Scottish band Albannach. It was intermittently live-recorded in 2007 while the band traveled throughout Scotland and North America.

== Track listing ==
Track number	Track name	Vocalist
1	"Pictavia's Pride"	none
2	"Rampant's Revenge"	none
3	"Ancestors"	Jacquie Holland
4	"In Bed With Quinsy"	none
5	"The Gael"	none
6	"Hooligan's Holiday"	none
7	"Scotland Is Her Name"	Jacquie Holland
8	"Burlin"	none
9	"Tweedle Dee Tweedle Dum"	none
10	"Intro To Finalé"	none
11	"Hornpipes From Hell"	Albannach

== Credits ==
- Jamesie Johnston – Bass drum, vocals, bodhrán
- Donnie MacNeill – Bagpipes, drums
- Jacquie Holland – Drums, percussion, vocals
- Kyle Gray – Lead drum
- Aya Thorne – Bodhrán, percussion
- Davey 'Ramone' Morrison – Bodhrán, vocals, whistles
- Andy Malkin – Engineering, additional instruments
- Mick MacNeil – Production
