= Tom Russell (DJ) =

Tom Russell (born August 1948), known in the United Kingdom as "The Godfather of Rock", is a Scottish rock disc jockey and radio presenter who was born and educated in Kirkintilloch, Scotland. Russell spent some time in the Parachute Regiment (United Kingdom) and then running a chain of his own record shops, including the Bishopbriggs-based branch, 'Tom Russell's Record Shop'. His broadcasting career began when Richard Park invited him to Radio Clyde (1981 - 2006) where he hosted the long running Friday Night Rock Show. In this time he interviewed many including Ozzy Osbourne, Bon Jovi, Iron Maiden, and Metallica. Jay Crawford then invited him as first choice (2007 to 2014) to host shows on Rock Radio 96.3 which broadcast in the Glasgow and Central Scotland area. He most recently worked for Rocksport Radio and Real Radio XS, Manchester. Russell is now broadcasting three times a week on the MAX on dab radio and online at maxradio.co.uk.

In May 2026 he relaunched his Friday Rock Show on a new station, Rock.Scot.

He is the compere of WinterStorm, an annual classic rock music festival held in Troon.

== Awards ==
In September 2012, Russell was presented with a Lifetime Achievement Award at the Scottish New Music Awards ceremony held in The Classic Grand in Glasgow, Scotland.
