= Beautiful Thing (Do song) =

Single by Do

from the album Follow Me
- Released: July 2006
- Recorded: 2005
- Genre: Pop
- Length: 3.59
- Label: Sony/BMG

Do singles chronology
"Follow Me" (2006)	"Beautiful Thing" (2006)	"Sending Me Roses" (2006)

"Beautiful Thing" is the second single of Dutch pop singer Do from her second album, Follow Me.

== Track listing ==
CD single

1. "Beautiful Thing"
2. "When Everything Is Gone"

== Video ==
The video was shot in Bonaire. It was the first video shot there. On Bonaire Do shot two videos, one for "Beautiful Thing" and the other for "Sending Me Roses". In "Beautiful Thing" she's singing about how good love is, but in "Sending Me Roses" she is over that. So, it's a continuing story, with "Beautiful Thing" being part 1 and "Sending Me Roses" being part 2.

== Charts ==
Chart (2006)	Peak position
Dutch Top 40	23
MegaCharts	19
