= Love Is Killing Me =

Single by Do

from the album Do
- Released: June 7, 2004
- Recorded: 2002–2004
- Genre: Pop
- Length: 3.07
- Label: BMG
- Songwriter(s): Tony Cornelissen and Allan Eshuijs

Do singles chronology
"Voorbij" (2004)	"Love Is Killing Me" (2004)	"Angel by My Side" (2004)

"Love Is Killing Me" is the second single released by Dutch singer Do from her debut album, Do. It peaked at number seven on the Dutch singles chart.

== Track listing ==
1. "Love Is Killing Me" 3.07
2. "Have I Told You Lately (live @ Radio538)" 4.21

== Charts ==
=== Weekly charts ===
Chart (2004)	Peak position
Belgium (Ultratop 50 Flanders)	40
Netherlands (Dutch Top 40)	6
Netherlands (Single Top 100)	11

=== Year-end charts ===
Chart (2004)	Position
Netherlands (Dutch Top 40)	90
