= Eye of the Storm (Albannach album) =

Studio album by Albannach
- Released: 2007
- Genre: Celtic battle music
- Length: 43:08
- Label: Albannach Music
- Producer: Mick MacNeil

Albannach chronology
Albannach (2006)	Eye of the Storm (2007)	Circa B.C. (2007)

Eye of the Storm is the second album of Scottish band Albannach. It was recorded in the spring of 2007 in Auchindoun, Scotland.

== Track listing ==
Track number	Track name	Length	Vocalist
1	"The Uprising"	4:43	Jamesie Johnston
2	"Rampant's Revenge"	4:09	none
3	"Auld Nick's a Piper"	2:44	none
4	"Scotland is her Name"	3:18	Jacquie Holland
5	"Alexander's Welcome"	3:59	none
6	"Atholl Express"	2:48	none
7	"Corpse Foot Jigs"	3:23	none
8	"Rebel King"	2:28	Jamesie Johnson, Davie Morrison
9	"The Gael"	5:29	none
10	"Pictavia's Pride"	3:04	none
11	"Valhalla's Feast"	4.16	Jacquie Holland
12	"Fallen Heroes"	2.44	Albannach

== Credits ==
- Jamesie Johnston – Bass Drum, Vocals, Bodhrán
- Donnie MacNeill – Bagpipes, Drums
- Jacquie Holland – Drums, Percussion, Vocals
- Kyle Gray – Lead Drums
- Aya Thorne – Bodhrán, Percussion
- Davey 'Ramone' Morrison – Bodhrán, Vocals, Whistles
- Andy Malkin – Engineering, Additional instruments
- Mick MacNeil – Production
