= Sending Me Roses =

Single by Do

from the album Follow Me
- Released: October 7, 2006
- Recorded: 2006
- Genre: Pop
- Length: 3:08
- Label: Sony/BMG

Do singles chronology
"Beautiful Thing" (2006)	"Sending Me Roses" (2006)	"I Will" (2006)

"Sending Me Roses" is the third single of Dutch pop singer Do from her second album, Follow Me. It was released only for download.

== Track listing ==
Download Track

1. "Sending Me Roses"

== Video ==
The video was shot in Bonaire. It is the continued story of "Beautiful Thing" where Do is now sick of the games her lover plays and cannot take it any more.

In Beautiful Thing she was singing about how good love is; while in Sending Me Roses she seems to be over that.
