= Do (Do album) =

Studio album by Do
- Released: July 1, 2004
- Recorded: 2003–2004
- Genre: Pop
- Length: 50:02
- Label: BMG Netherlands

Do chronology
Do (2004)	Follow Me (2006)

Do is the debut studio album by Dutch singer Do. It was initially released on July 1, 2004, including the singles "Heaven", "On and On", "Love Is Killing Me" and "Angel by My Side". Do co-wrote 4 songs on the album, "Closer to You", "Should I", "Selfish", and "I Believe in Love". It charted at No. 3 in the Netherlands and was awarded gold certification for selling over 40,000 copies.

== Track listing ==
No.	Title	Writer(s)	Length
1.	"I Don't Want to Be Your Friend"	Dianne Warren	3:39
2.	"Angel of Mine"	Alexandra Prinz, Christoph Brüx, Mirko von Schlieffen, S. Browarczyk	3:28
3.	"Love Is Killing Me"	Tony Cornelissen and Allan Eshuijs	3:07
4.	"Heaven (Piano Mix)"	Bryan Adams and Jim Vallance	4:03
5.	"Close to You"	Do, Nick Whitecross, Jon Kingsley Hall, George Stewart	4:18
6.	"Angel by My Side"	Alistair Griffin, Tom Martin, James Martin	3:23
7.	"Should I"	Do, Jon Kingsley Hall, George Stewart, Sean Kelly	4:45
8.	"So Near, So Far"	Mike Stelk and Allan Eshuijs	3:30
9.	"Selfish"	Do, Kevin Hunter, Jon Kingsley Hall, George Stewart	3:26
10.	"I Believe in Love"	Do, Kevin Hunter, Jon Kingsley Hall, George Stewart, Nick Whitecross	3:53
11.	"On and On (Piano Mix)"	Yann Peifer, Sebastian Golasik, Sebastian Kaizik, Frank Reinert, Sven Petersen	3:54
12.	"The Day You Went Away"	Johnny Male, Mark Batson	3:59
13.	"Voorbij" (duet with Marco Borsato)	John Ewbank, Han Kooreneef	4:04

== Chart positions ==
Chart (2004–05)	Peak position
Belgian Albums (Ultratop Flanders)	94
Dutch Albums (Album Top 100)	3

== Certifications ==
Certifications for Do
Region	Certification	Certified units/sales
Netherlands (NVPI)	Gold	40,000^{^}
^{^} Shipments figures based on certification alone.
