= Angel by My Side =

Single by Do

from the album Do
- Released: July 29, 2004
- Recorded: 2002–2004
- Genre: Pop
- Length: 3.25
- Label: Sony BMG
- Songwriter(s): Alistair Griffin, Tom Martin, James Martin

Do singles chronology
"Love Is Killing Me" (2004)	"Angel by My Side" (2004)	"Everyday Christmas" (2004)

"Angel by My Side" is the third single of Dutch singer Do off her debut album, Do. The song was co-written by English songwriters Alistair Griffin and James and Tom Martin. It peaked at No. 10 on the Dutch singles chart.

It was used as the title song for the film Ellis in Glamourland.

== Track listing ==
CD single

1. "Angel by My Side (single version)" 3.25
2. "Close to You" 4.20
3. "Ellis in Glamourland" (Trailer)

== Charts ==
=== Weekly charts ===
Chart (2004)	Peak position
Netherlands (Dutch Top 40)	10
Netherlands (Single Top 100)	11

=== Year-end charts ===
Chart (2004)	Position
Netherlands (Dutch Top 40)	86
Netherlands (Single Top 100)	93
