= Vega (British band) =

British rock band

- Origin: Stratford-upon-Avon/York, England
- Genres: Rock, melodic rock, AOR
- Years active: 2009–present
- Labels: Frontiers, Spinefarm/Ninetone (Universal Music Group)
- Members: Nick Workman (vocals); Mart Trail (bass); Marcus Thurston (guitar); Billy Taylor (guitar); Pete Newdeck (drums)
- Past members: Dan Chantrey (drums); Martin "Hutch" Hutchison (drums); MyKey Kew (guitar and backing vocals); James Martin (keyboards); Tom Martin (bass)
- Website: www.vegaofficial.co.uk

Vega (generally presented VEGA for promotional purposes) is an English rock band. They were formed in 2009 and have released seven albums to date, with their most recent released in September 2021. Vega are named after the fifth-brightest star in the night sky.

== History ==
=== 2009–2016 ===
Vega were formed following a meeting between Nick Workman, Dan Chantrey and twins James and Tom Martin at the Z Rock Festival at JBs in Dudley, 29/30 May 2009. The Martin brothers had been in a number of bands and had written songs for a selection of artists and bands including Khymera, Danny Vaughn, Joe Lynn Turner, House of Lords, Ted Poley and Tommy Funderburk, many of these for the Frontiers label. They had discussed forming a band with Frontiers management, proposing Nick Workman as lead vocalist.

It was during their time with Kryah (2004-2006) and The Station Club (2006-2009) that James and Tom first teamed up with Dan Chantrey, who played drums for both bands. Frontman Nick Workman established a name for himself in Kick (1999–2004) and then Eden (2006–2009).

Following the meeting at Z Rock Festival, songs were penned for a debut album (with no one song taking longer than 24 hours to write), these recorded between the summer and November 2009. Kiss of Life was released by Frontiers Records on 6 December 2010. The album was produced and mastered by John Greatwood and Dennis Ward, respectively. Drummer Dan Chantrey proposed the name Vega for the band.

Following some live dates work began on a follow-up release, this essentially completed sometime before the band had secured a release deal. A deal was made with Spinefarm Records/Ninetone (distributed through Universal Music Group) in 2011, but it would be 18 March 2013 before What the Hell! was finally released. What the Hell! was produced by John Greatwood.

An early taste of the album came in October 2012 with the release of the single "White Knuckle Ride". Following album release, a UK tour support-slot with FM followed, and then later in the year a few extra dates as headliners.

Between the recording and actual release of the What the Hell! album Marcus Thurston became a bona fide member of the band, officially joining in February 2013.

Vega's third album, Stereo Messiah, was released by Frontiers Records on 17 October 2014. The album was recorded in Reading and produced by John Mitchell, guitarist and singer with It Bites. It included a cover of Def Leppard's "10x Bigger Than Love", with backing vocals by Joe Elliot. The artwork of Stereo Messiah is by Nello Dell' Omo.

To promote Stereo Messiah Vega did a short four-date headlining tour in November 2014, and in December 2014 supported Joe Elliot's Down 'n' Outz.

Vega had returned to Frontiers for Stereo Messiah as the band was dissatisfied with the promotion and limited release What the Hell! received through Ninetone. While writing material for Stereo Messiah some demos were sent to Frontiers Records and a three-album deal was signed. Frontiers subsequently re-released What the Hell! worldwide and at the same time Stereo Messiah was released.

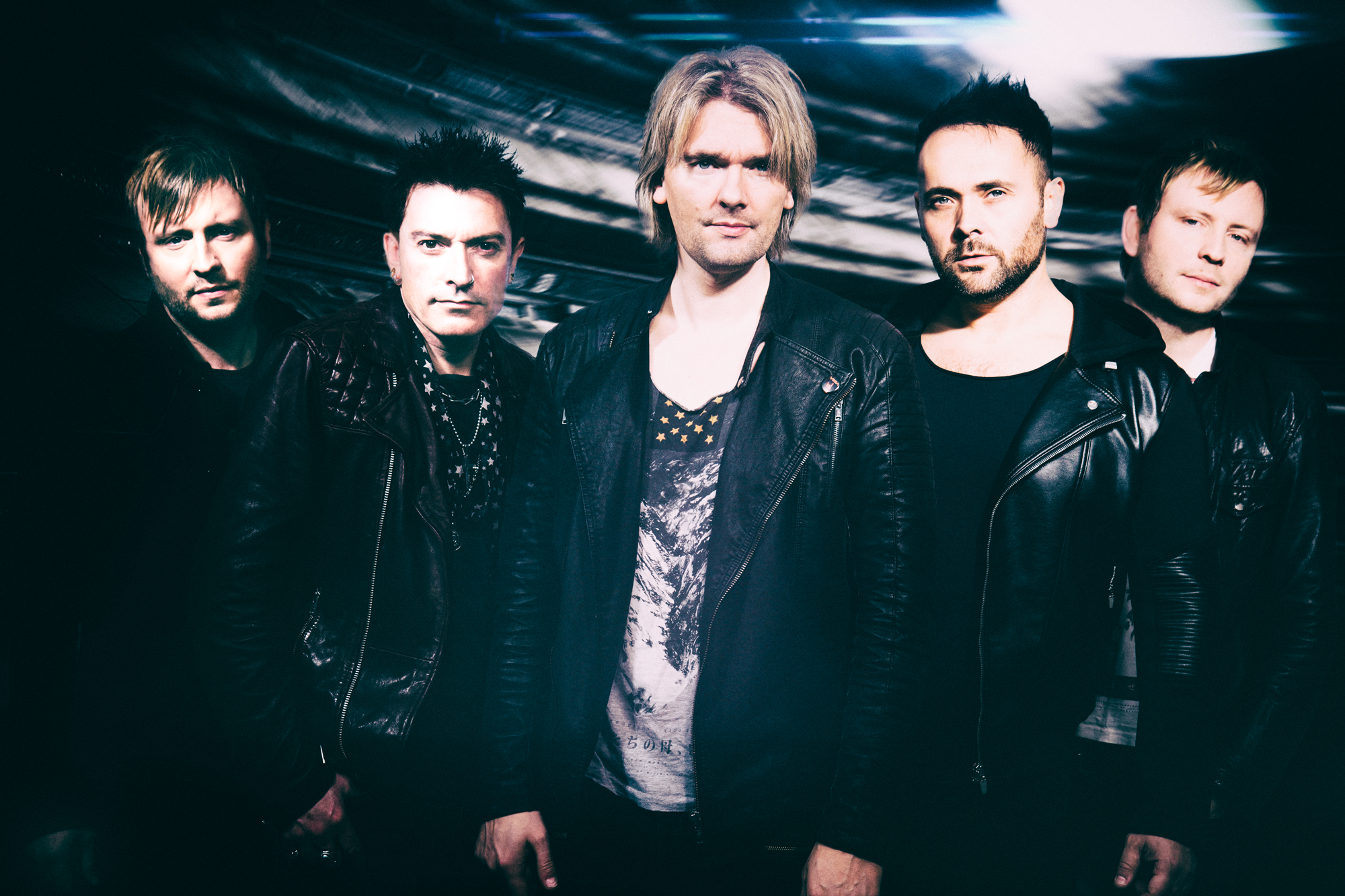
VEGA circa 2016

On 22 February the band announced their fourth studio album, Who We Are, was to be released on 13 May on Frontiers Records. Who We Are was produced by Harry Hess and recorded at Monnow Valley Studio in Wales. As with Stereo Messiah, cover photography was by Steven Christie of Darklight Device. Who We Are reached number 19 on the UK Rock Chart.

Promoting Who Are We, Vega toured from 11 May 2016 in support of Magnum, and also did a headline gig at the O2 Academy 2, Islington on 28 May 2016. Also in 2016, Vega appeared at the Steelhouse Festival, 23–24 July 2016, and in Italy on 1 October headlined Melodic Rock Night at the Grindhouse Club, Padova. There were also three dates in Spain in October.

On 17 January 2016 Vega announced four dates for November/December. Further support dates for Magnum followed.

=== 2017–2019 ===
During 2017, Vega appeared in Derby at The Spot (28 January 2017) as part of a multi-band line-up, and then appeared (as part of a multi-band line-up) at Planet Rock's Winter's End festival at Sandford Holiday Park, Poole, Dorset between 24–26 February 2017, performing on the 26th. The band next appeared in Pwllheli, Wales at Hard Rock Heaven AOR5 (9-12 March 2017), playing on 11 March. This was followed between 1 March and 15 March 2017 with the band supporting Dan Reed Network on 11 nights of the Fight Another Day tour.

On 24 April it was confirmed that drummer Dan Chantrey had been asked to leave the band following the Dan Reed Network tour. In a statement on Vega's official website, Nick Workman confirmed that then-upcoming Vega gigs would go ahead as planned, with a new drummer to be announced in due course. It was also confirmed that recording of their fifth album would commence in the summer.

Vega appeared (as part of a multi-band line-up) at Nordic Noise in Copenhagen on 12 May 2017 and then at the Amplified Festival, Gloucestershire on Saturday 23 July. On 30 June 2017, the band announced that at their September headline shows a limited edition CD of previously unreleased demo tracks would be available for purchase. The ten demo tracks on the album, entitled Now That's What I Call Vega: Demos Vol 1 date from 2011 until 2017 and have not featured on any of the four studio albums released to date. On 28 July, Vega announced on their official Facebook page a new drummer, Martin John Hutchison, also known as "Hutch".

On 21 September 2017, Vega started a six-date headlining tour of the UK at the Robin 2, Bilston, the tour concluding on 30 September at the Foundry, Sheffield. The band then appeared (as part of a multi-band line-up) at the Rockingham Festival in Nottingham (20–22 October), performing a 10-song set on 21 October. On 23 September, Vega announced on their official Facebook page the Vega Who We Are Xmas Party was to be held at the Slade Rooms, Wolverhampton on Saturday 9 December.

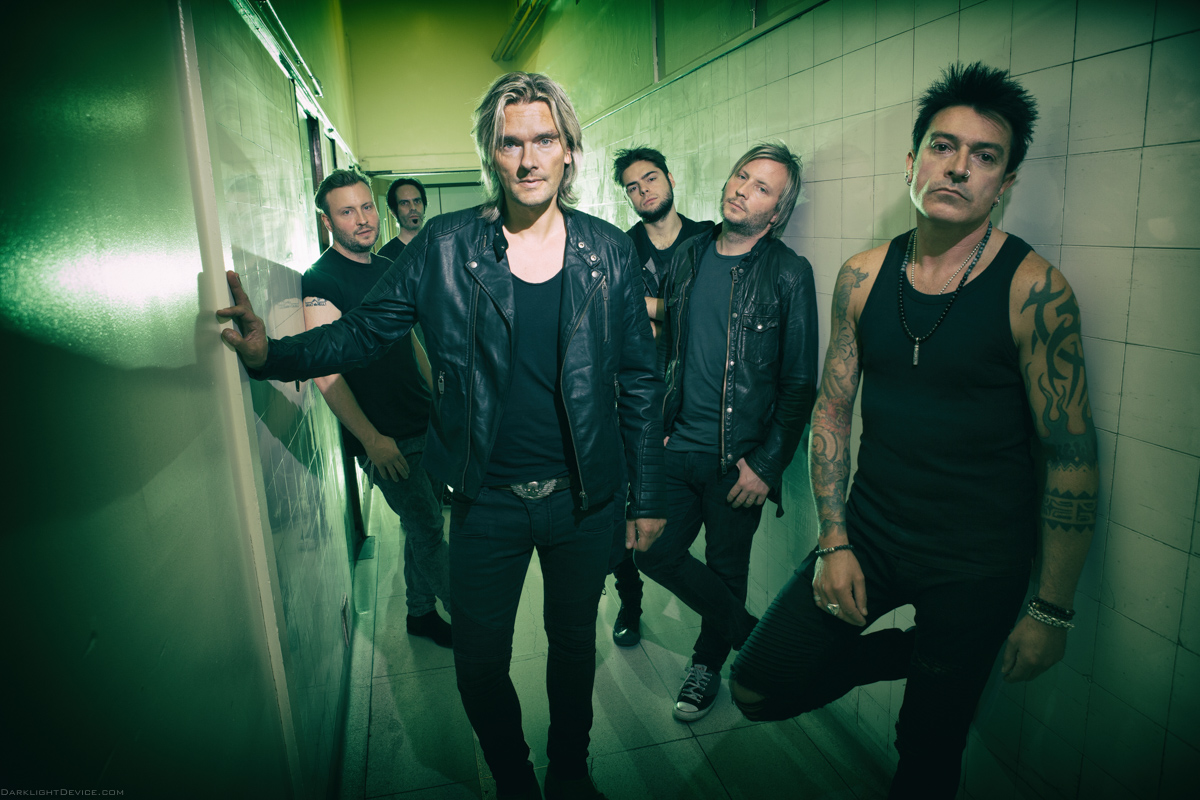
VEGA circa 2018

On 25 January 2018, Vega announced on Facebook their album was "in the can". It was self-produced by VEGA and mixed and mastered by Harry Hess. On 28 February 2018 the band announced it was titled Only Human and would be released by Frontiers Records on 11 May 2018. Promotional material for the 12-track album listed a sixth band member for the first time, MyKey Kew, on guitar and backing vocals. Kew had been performing with the live band for some time prior to this formal acknowledgement. Of the album, lead vocalist Nick Workman commented: "We wear our love of 80's rock music on our sleeves, but we also have injected our love of modern rock music to it. We aren't trying to rehash anything: the sound we have achieved is 100% Vega. We didn't want to try and guess what people expect and get it wrong." Only Human is the first Vega album to be available in vinyl format. On 5 March 2018, Red Sand PR issued a press release announcing that following an appearance at the Wildfire Festival in Scotland on 23 June, the band with special guests Midnite City would commence a UK tour starting in Manchester (Ruby Lounge) on 26 June and concluding in London (Camden Underworld) on 7 July. Also on 5 March the first single from Only Human, "Last Man Standing", was released. The second single from the album, "Worth Dying For", was released on 16 March. On 14 May Vega announced the re-launch of their official website. On 18 May the band disclosed on their Facebook page that Only Human had entered to official UK Rock Chart at No.3 and the official UK Indie Chart at No.15.

On 13 June Vega announced a four-date tour of Spain in November, running 22 to 25 November. On 15 September Vega appeared at Indoor Summer 2018 in Germany. On 15 June the third single from the album Only Human, "Let's Have Fun Tonight", was released. On 10 July Vega announced the 2nd Vega Christmas Party at the Robin, Bilston on 8 December.

Vega continued to tour during 2019 with early 2019 dates including a short tour in January supporting Skid Row and a 2 February appearance at Frontiers Rock UK Festival. Further appearances included a 15 March gig at the HRH AOR festival, a series of April dates with The Quireboys, FM and Bad Touch, and a 14 June appearance at Download Festival. In December 2019, and to celebrate ten years of VEGA, the band recorded and released a new version of their first single, "Kiss Of Life".

=== 2020 onwards ===
In January 2020, the band announced that plays on Spotify had reached one million. Prior to COVID-19, the band were to tour throughout 2020, with scheduled dates including support slots for Magnum in Germany, Italy and Switzerland in May.

On 12 June 2020, Vega released the band's sixth studio album, Grit Your Teeth, and in September the band announced their new line-up which took the album on the road throughout 2021. Ex-Inglorious guitarist Billy Taylor replaced Mikey/MyKey Kew on guitars, while to replace Martin “Hutch” Hutchinson on drums long-time friend of the band Pete Newdeck came in to help out for the 'foreseeable future', and remains.

On 17 September 2021, Vega released the band's seventh studio album, Anarchy And Unity, the band line-up remaining constant from the earlier Grit Your Teeth release. Official music video Sooner Or Later was released from the album on 1 July 2021, this followed by Ain't Who I Am on 3 August 2021.

On 5 February 2022 the band announced they would again be joining Magnum as support for their 2022 tour. Other confirmed dates for 2022 include FiendFest 2022 on 18/19 November.

Towards the end of summer 2022 it was announced that Tom and James Martin had left the band. The departure was described as totally amicable and both parties support each other going forwards. In December 2022 Mart Trail was officially announced as a band member.

== Musical style and influences ==
In an interview with Midlands Rocks Radio, Nick Workman likened the band sound/style to that of classic era Bon Jovi/Def Leppard with a few other smaller influences in the mix. He also referred to VEGA as having a rock sound, and not necessarily an AOR sound. He lists his vocal influences as Ray Gillen (Badlands), Joe Elliott, Kip Winger and Joey Tempest.

During an interview for Rock Radio NI, on the subject of Vega's songwriting style, Workman said: "Normally what will happen is that either one or both of them (Martin twins) will come up with a backing track and they'll send it over to me and I'll always do the lyrics and melodies for it. Occasionally Tom will come up with a backing track and I'll put something together with it and then Jim will come in and say I think we should go for this note here or that note there. So between the three of us we'll always do it. There's always three inputs into any song."

== Gallery ==
VEGA

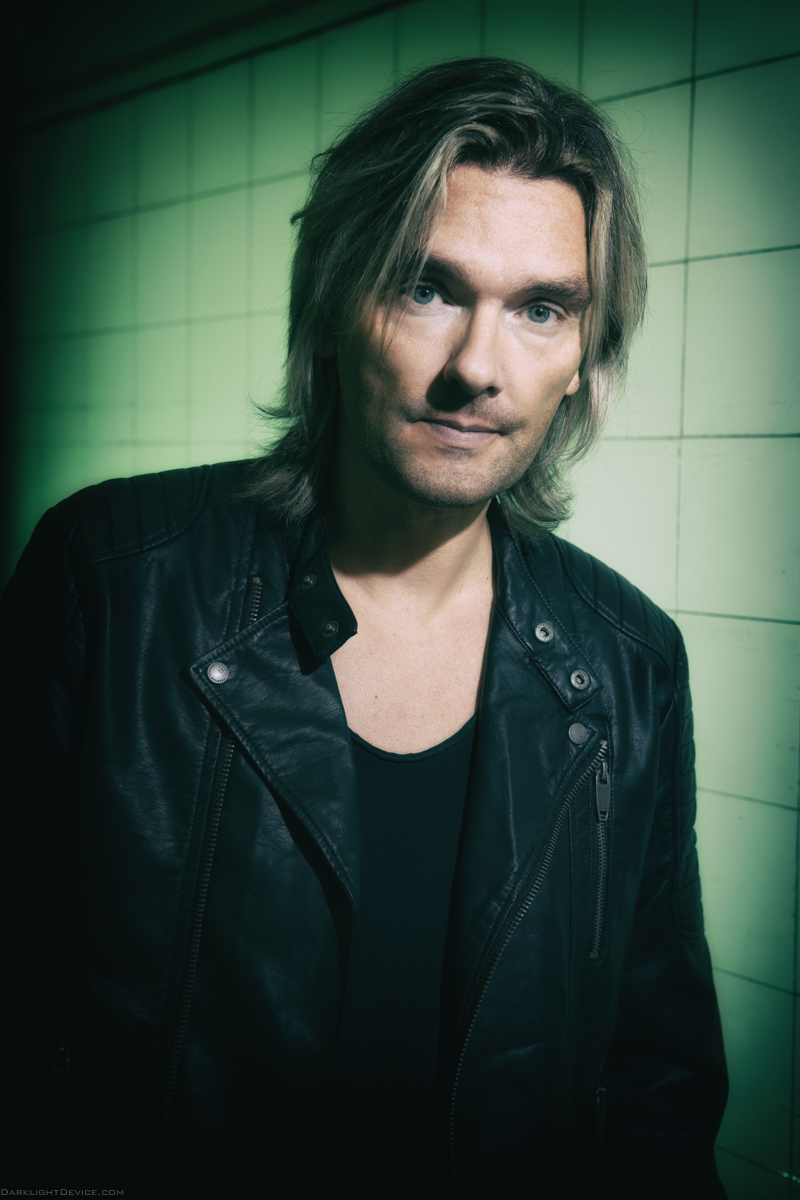
Nick Workman (vocals)

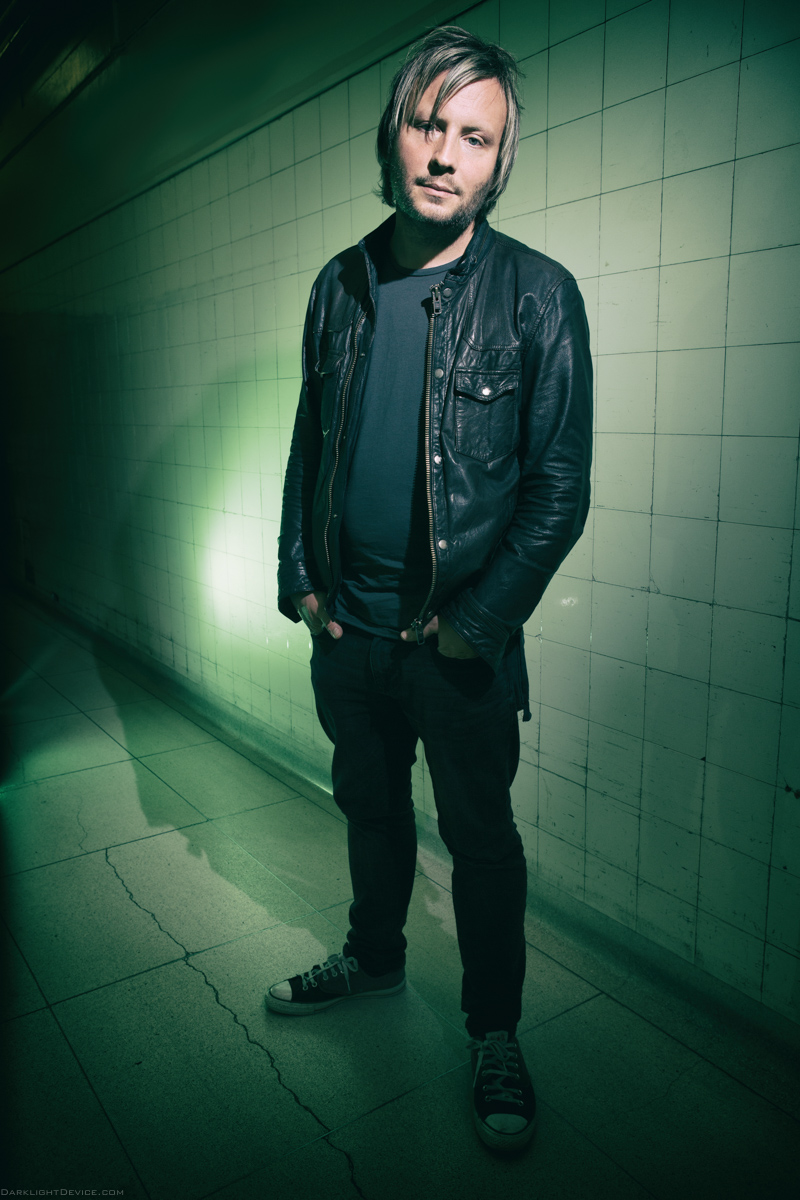
James Martin (keyboards)

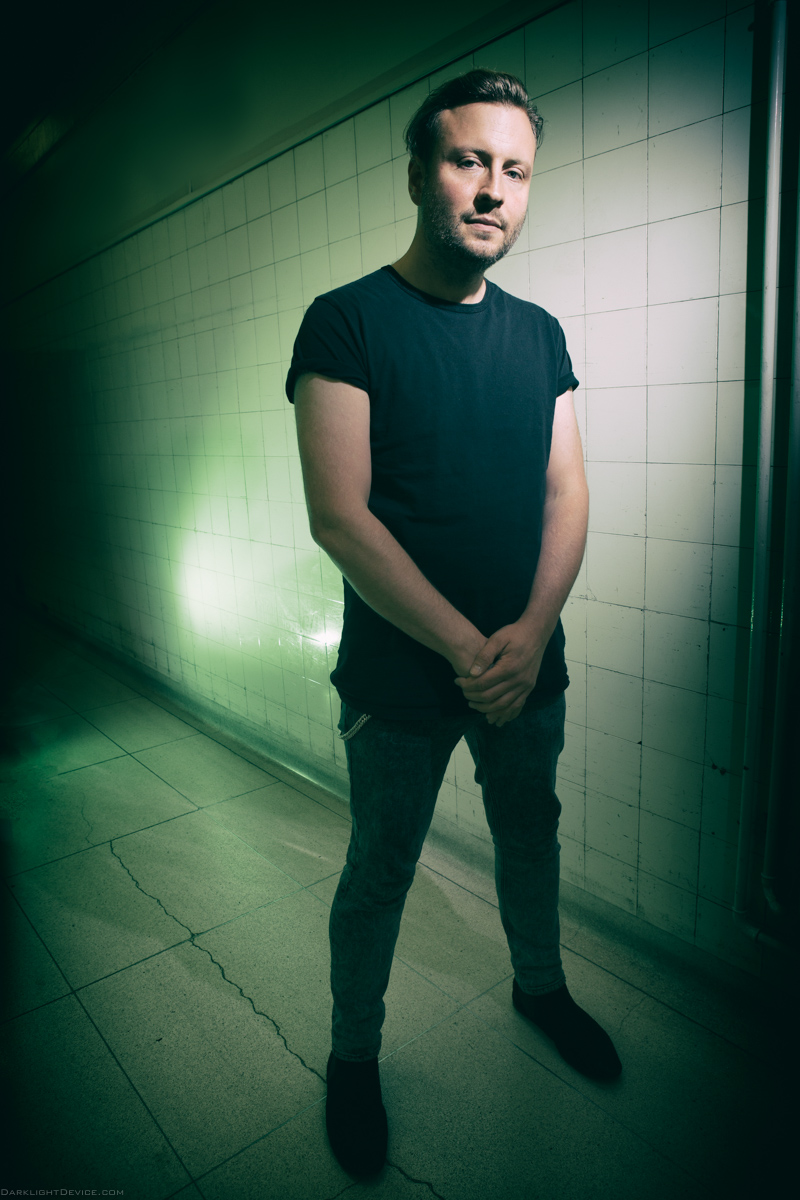
Tom Martin (bass)

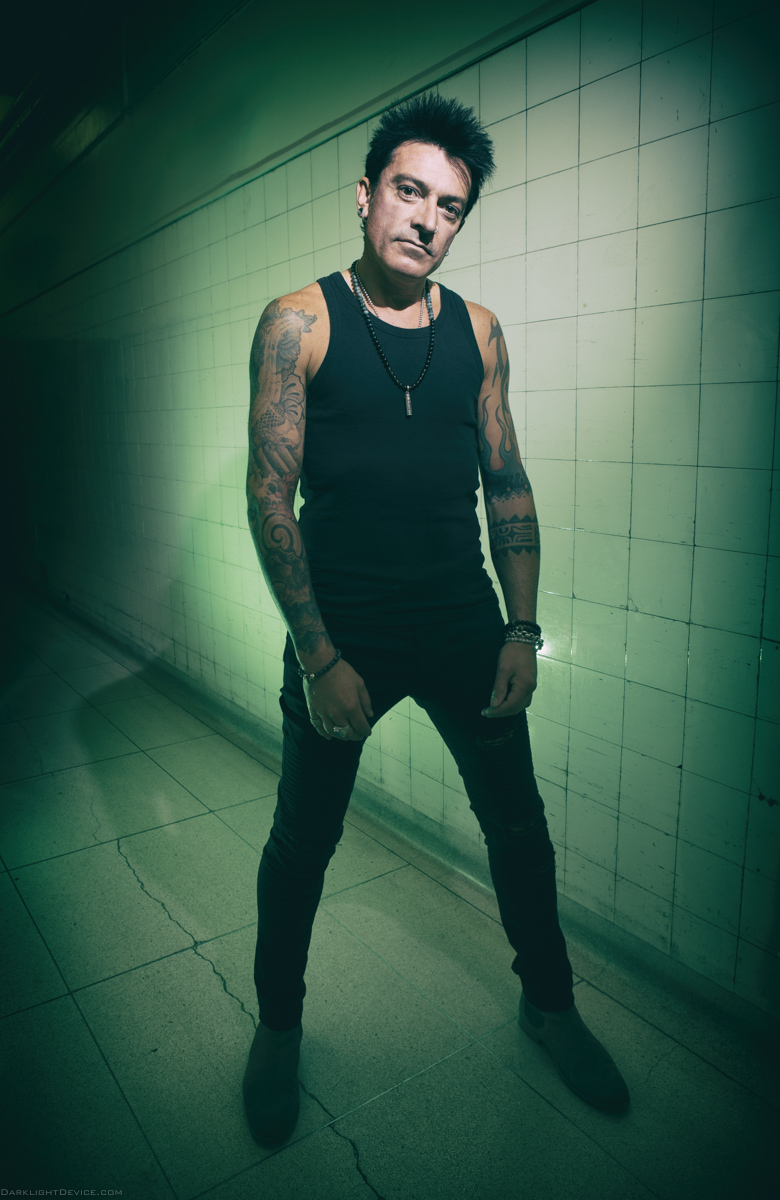
Marcus Thurston (guitar)

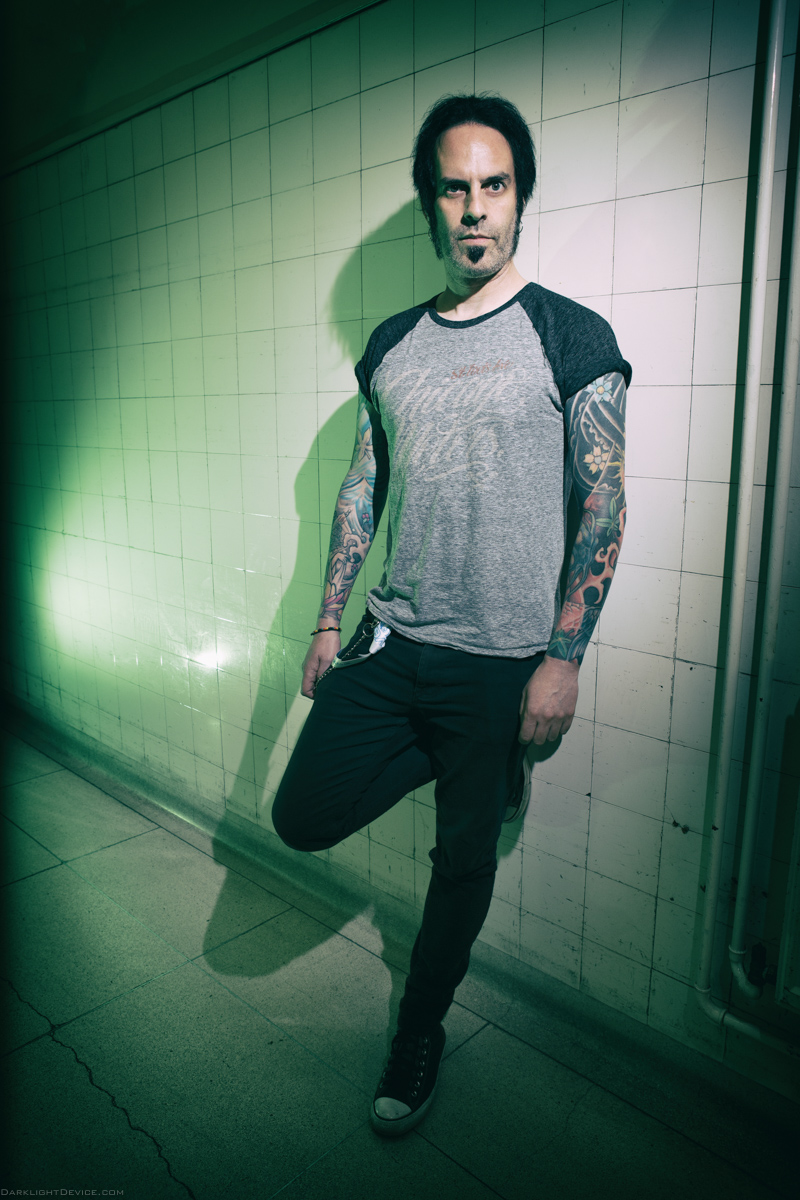
Martin “Hutch” Hutchinson (drums)

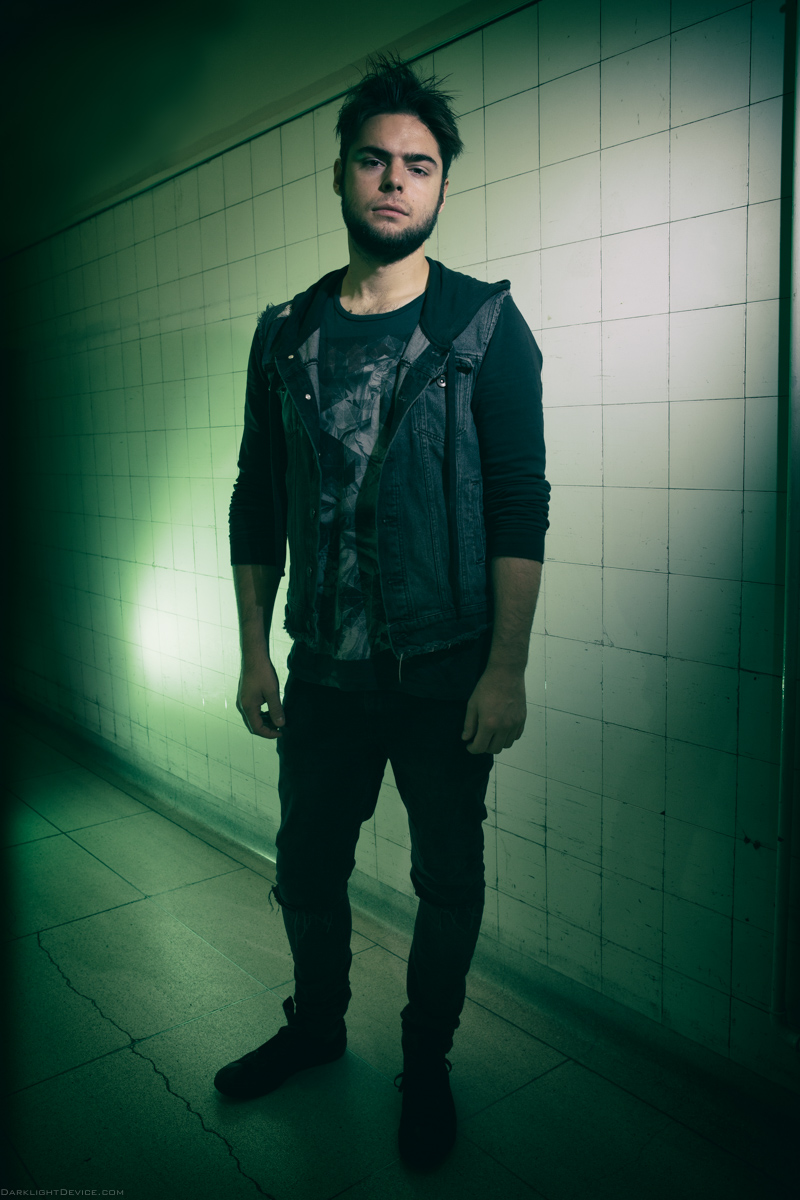
Mikey/MyKey Kew (guitar and backing vocals)

== Band members ==
=== Current ===
- Nick Workman – vocals (2009–present)
- James Martin – keyboards (2009–2022)
- Tom Martin – bass (2009–2022)
- Marcus Thurston – guitar (2009–present)
- Billy Taylor - guitar (2020-present)
- Pete Newdeck - drums (2020-present)

=== Former ===
- Dan Chantrey – drums (2009–2017)
- Martin "Hutch" Hutchison – drums (July 2017–2020)
- Mikey/MyKey Kew – guitar and backing vocals (2017–2020)

== Discography ==
Studio albums

- Kiss of Life – 6 December 2010 (Frontiers)
- What the Hell! – 18 March 2013 (Spinefarm Records/Ninetone)
- Stereo Messiah – 17 October 2014 (Frontiers)
- Who We Are – 13 May 2016 (Frontiers)
- Only Human – 11 May 2018 (Frontiers)
- Grit Your Teeth - 12 June 2020 (Frontiers)
- Anarchy And Unity - 17 September 2021 (Frontiers)
- Battlelines - 9 August 2023 (Frontiers)

Other albums

- Now That's What I Call Vega: Demos Vol 1 - September 2017 (self-released; limited edition available at shows only)

Singles

- "Kiss of Life" (October 2009)
- "White Knuckle Ride" (September 2012)
- "What the Hell" (May 2013)
- "Stereo Messiah" (August 2014)
- "Gonna Need Some Love" (January 2015)
- "White Flag" (March 2016)
- "Last Man Standing" (March 2018)
- "Worth Dying For" (March 2018)
- "Grit Your Teeth" (20 March 2020)
- "(I Don't Need) Perfection'" (15 April 2020)
- "Fool Yourself Again" (15 May 2020)
- "How We Live" (12 June 2020)
- "Man On A Mission" (17 Dec 2020)
- "Sooner Or Later" (1 July 2021)
- "Ain't Who I Am" (3 August 2021)
- "Beautiful Lie" (1 September 2021)
- "Welcome To Wherever" (17 September 2021)
