= The New Roses =

German band

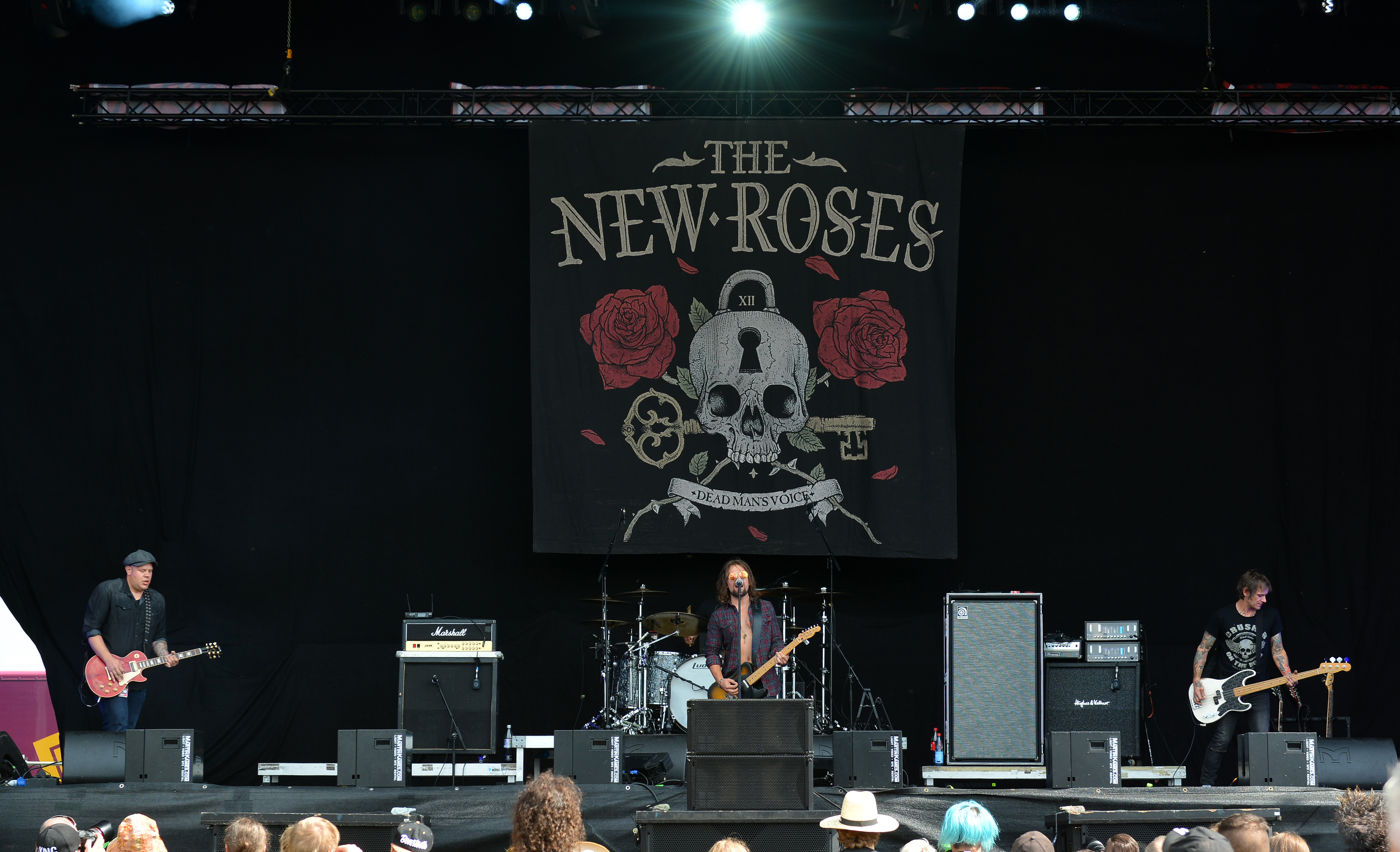

Background information
- Origin: Wiesbaden, Germany
- Genres: Hard rock, rock
- Members: Timmy Rough; Norman Bites; Hardy; Urban Berz
- Website: thenewroses.com

The New Roses (stylised as THE NEW ROSES) is a rock band from Wiesbaden, Germany.

== History ==
The New Roses were founded in 2007 by singer Timmy Rough and drummer Urban Berz and officially took on the name "The New Roses" in 2012. The band was completed in 2012 with Stefan Kassner (bass guitar) and Dizzy Presley (guitar). By this time, The New Roses had already opened for ZZ Top, Black Stone Cherry, Joe Bonamassa, Die Toten Hosen, Blackfoot, Kiss and Roger Chapman. In 2010 the band toured as special guest for US southern rockers Molly Hatchet on their "Justice World Tour" in Germany and Switzerland.

In December 2012, The New Roses released their first record, the self-titled four-track EP, on their own label (distributed by Soulfool). The EP included three original compositions and a cover version of Tom Petty's "Refugee". In 2013, The New Roses released their debut album Without a Trace. The title track was included on the German soundtrack of the US biker TV series Sons of Anarchy (Sony Music). In May 2014, Stefan Kassner and Dizzy Presley left the band and were replaced shortly after by Norman Bites (guitar) and Hardy (bass guitar). Between 2012 and 2014, The New Roses played more than 150 shows in Germany, Switzerland, and Spain. On 14 February 2015 the New Roses signed an international record deal with Napalm Records. On 6 June 2015 The New Roses played at the UEFA Champions-League-Final at the Brandenburger Tor in Berlin.

In Autumn and Winter 2015, the band played another couple of shows as special guest of Accept in Germany and France and opened for Molly Hatchet on their German tour in December. The second album Dead Man's Voice including the radio single "Thirsty" was released on 26 February 2016 and reached number 36 in the German album charts. On the same day, the "Dead Man's Voice" Tour started with a sold-out show at the Schlachthof in Wiesbaden, Germany. In Summer 2016, shows on European festivals followed, The New Roses performed at the Summer Breeze Festival and Rock Harz Open Air in Germany, Love Ride Festival in Switzerland, and on Show Bike Aquitaine, Raismes Fest, and Plougarock Festival in France. Throughout the summer, The New Roses performed as special guest of The Dead Daisies and performed as support for Y&T.

In October 2016, The New Roses toured in Germany with their label mates Serum 114 and opened for Saxon in December.

In February 2017, The New Roses played their first three shows in England, which included performances in London, Derby, and Nottingham.

In April 2017, The New Roses played a two-week tour in Spain followed by shows in France. In June, The New Roses joined The Dead Daisies for their tour as special guest for their shows in Germany, Switzerland, and France as a warm up for their show at Hellfest, which also included performances by Airbourne, Steel Panther, and Aerosmith.

In August 2017 The New Roses released their third album One More For The Road (Napalm Records/Universal), which hit the German Top 20 album charts and the Swiss Top 100 album charts on #52. It contained the two radio singles "Every Wild Heart" and "Life Ain't Easy (For a Boy With Long Hair)". Like the previous records it was produced by Markus Teske at Bazement Studios in Strinz-Trinitatis, Germany.

In September 2017 The New Roses played two shows in Camp Marmal, Mazar i Sharif, Afghanistan, for the multinational troops of operation "Resolute Support".

The following "One More for the Road" tour led the band through several European countries, including a show at Hard Rock Hell Festival in Wales (UK) together with Airbourne and Y&T.

== Discography ==
Albums

- Without a Trace (2013)
- Dead Man's Voice (2016)
- One More for the Road (2017)
- Nothing but Wild (2019)
- Sweet Poison (2022)
- Attracted to Danger (2024)

Extended plays

- The New Roses (2012)
