= Do (singer) =

Dutch singer (born 1981)

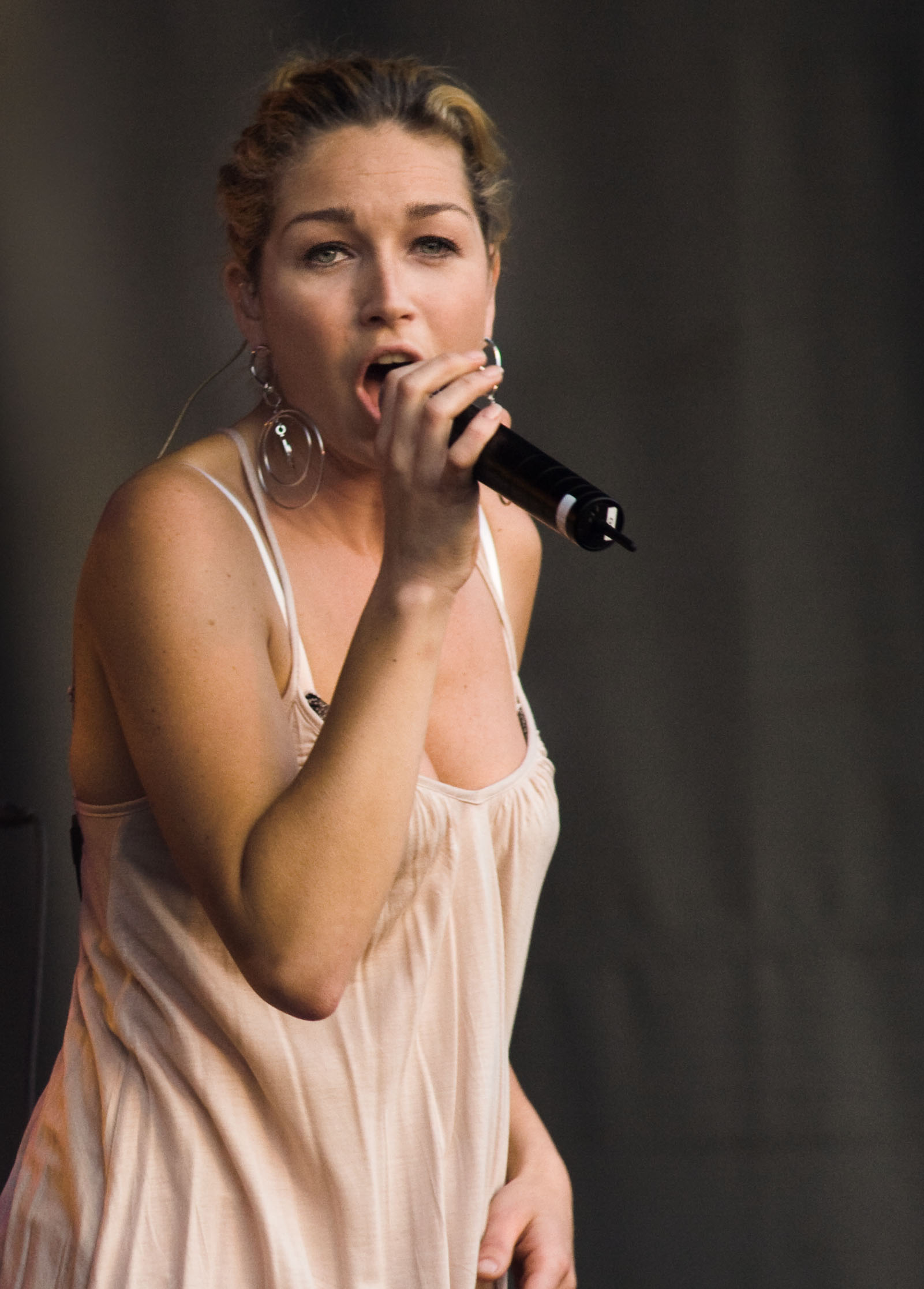
- Do in 2007

Background information
- Born: Dominique Rijpma van Hulst; 7 September 1981 (age 44); Valkenswaard, Netherlands
- Genres: Dance-pop, adult contemporary, Nederpop
- Occupations: Singer, songwriter
- Years active: 2000–present
- Label: Sony BMG
- Website: www.domusic.nl

Dominique Rijpma van Hulst (Dutch pronunciation: [doːmiˈnik ˈrɛipmaː vɑn ˈɦʏlst]; born 7 September 1981) is a Dutch singer known by her stage name Do (/doʊ/ DOH). She is best known for singing vocals in the song "Heaven", featuring DJ Sammy and DJ Yanou, a late-2001 cover of the 1985 song of the same name by Bryan Adams.

== Early life ==
Dominique Rijpma van Hulst was born in 1981 in Valkenswaard, Netherlands. She was raised by her stepfather Willem-Jan van Hulst, a popular tennis coach. At age fourteen, she planned to compete in Wimbledon, but an injury ended her tennis career.

Her first musical performance was in café Old Dutch in Valkenswaard, which led to a record label deal with Sony Music BMG.

== Music ==
=== Early career ===
Before she even released a single, Do was a supporting act for the tour of 5ive and Montell Jordan in the Netherlands. The first single she released was the song "Real Good". Although the music video was frequently played on the Dutch music channel TMF, it was not a hit song in the Netherlands. Later in an interview, she said: "It wasn't my sound, and I hated the video. Thankfully it wasn't a hit, 'cause I don't want people to remember me from that song."

After that, Do collaborated with DJ Sammy and Yanou, who is also her producer. The song was a cover of Bryan Adams' song "Heaven". It became an international hit. It reached the number one spot in the United Kingdom and was a Top ten hit in several countries.

A candlelight remix version was made with a slower, piano instrumental. During this time, she had some problems with the credits of the song. Everywhere she went, she was asked if she was DJ Sammy because the song (in accordance with most dance songs) was credited to DJ Sammy, and she was the main focus in the video. Do's candlelight version of "Heaven" is also used for the ending sequence of the TV series Cold Case, first season episode 8 "Fly Away".

=== Do ===
Do's self-titled debut, Do, was released in 2004, and reached No. 3 in the Netherlands. The first single from the album, "Voorbij", a duet with Marco Borsato, reached No. 1. She also had top-ten hits in the Netherlands with her next two singles, "Love Is Killing Me" (which reached the No. 6) and "Angel by My Side" (which reached No. 10). The fourth single was planned to be a cover of the Cyndi Lauper song "I Don't Want to Be Your Friend". The plan fell through - Do's management did not get the rights to release it as a single. The album received the Gold status (40,000 copies) in the Netherlands. To end the year, she recorded a Christmas song with Trijntje Oosterhuis on the order of Sky Radio. It was called "Everyday Is Christmas". Due to the airplay it reached No. 7 in the Dutch Top 40.

After the tsunami disaster in Indonesia, Do joined several Dutch artists to record a song for the victims of the tsunami. The song, "Als Je Iets Kan Doen" (If You Can Do Something), reached No. 1 in the Netherlands and stayed there for several weeks. All of the profits from the song went to the victims of the tsunami.

=== Follow Me ===
Do's second album, Follow Me, was released in the Netherlands on 19 June 2006. The first single was also called "Follow Me". The song was written by Bryan Adams and had already been recorded by Melanie C in 1999. The single peaked at No. 39 in the Dutch Top 40 but did better in the Megacharts Top 50, peaking at No. 17. The album debuted in the Dutch Megacharts Album Top 100 at No. 8 and peaked there for two weeks. The album contains 12 songs. The album meant a lot to Do, whose friend worked on the album with her before dying.

The second single from Follow Me was "Beautiful Thing". This song did better in the charts than "Follow Me" and it peaked at No. 23. It stayed in the Top 40 for 9 weeks. The video for "Beautiful Thing" was shot in Bonaire just like the third single of the album "Sending Me Roses" which was only released as a digital track. The two videos form a story.

In 2006, Do did a tour called Follow Me theater tour. The fourth single from the album was "I Will". It was released in February 2007. The song was re-recorded in Sweden. However, no video was made and the song failed to chart. Do has also had a Dutch EP, entitled "Zingen in het Donker", ("Singing in the Darkness" in English). The self-titled song was recorded in 4 different languages: Dutch, English, German and French. The proceeds were sent to a charity for Domestic Violence victims.

On 20 December 2009, Do premiered a new song, called "Nobody But Me", which was said to be off her upcoming album. Dominique Rijpma van Hulst stated the album was going to be released around March 2010; however, it has yet to be released. In 2010, she released an LP version of "Zingen in het Donker", but it had a very limited release in Europe, and only available on the European iTunes Store. The album contains 10 tracks from Do, and unlike her previous albums, "Zingen in het Donker" is completely in Dutch. The first single is titled after the name of the album.

=== Cinderella ===
From November 2007 to March 2008, Do starred in Assepoester, a Dutch version of Cinderella, as the title character. The production was held at the Efteling Theatre, a theatre in the Efteling amusement park in the Netherlands. It was Do's first live theatrical performance.

== Personal life ==
On 7 July 2007, Do married Marc Verschoor in Barcelona. The couple divorced in 2010 but reconciled in 2012. She gave birth to a son on 2 January 2014. She gave birth to another child in November 2017. Do posed nude for, and was featured on the cover of, the January 2009 issue of the Dutch edition of Playboy.

== Discography ==
=== Albums ===
Title	Year	Peak chart positions		Certifications
Title	Year	NL	BEL (Vl)	Certifications
Do	2004	3	94	NVPI: Gold
Follow Me	2006	8	—	
Zingen in het donker	2010	—	—	
Bubbles & Bells	2011	63	—	
Drie kleine kleutertjes en een dappere dodo	2015	44	—	
Uncovered Studio Sessions	2015	—	—	
Momentum	2017	30	142	
"—" denotes an album that did not chart or was not released in that territory.

=== Singles ===
==== As lead artist ====
Title	Year	Peak chart positions	
Title	Year	NL	BEL (Vl)
"Real Good"	2000	—	—
"Heaven (Unplugged)"	2003	4	—
"Love Is Killing Me"	2004	6	40
"Angel by My Side"	2004	10	—
"Follow Me"	2006	18	—
"Beautiful Thing"	2006	17	—
"Sending Me Roses"	2006	—	—
"I Will"	2006	49	—
"Zingen In Het Donker"	2009	57	—
"It's Christmas"	2010	—	—
"Hij Gelooft In Mij"	2011	1	—
"Laat Het Nu Maar Vrij"	2012	—	—
"Zonder Jou"	2016	—	—
"Sterker Dan Alleen"	2017	—	—
"Kerstmis, Je Bent Welkom Hier"	2017	—	—
"Gewoon Speciaal"	2019	—	—
"—" denotes a single that did not chart or was not released in that territory.

==== Collaborations ====
Title	Year	Peak chart positions										Certifications
Title	Year	NLD	BEL (Vl)	CAN	AUS	FRA	GER	IRE	NOR	UK	USA	Certifications
"Heaven" (DJ Sammy and Yanou featuring Do)	2001	12	14	7	4	5	10	3	8	1	8	BPI: 2× Platinum
"On and On" (ft. Yanou)	2002	75	—	—	—	—	68	—	—	—	—	
"Heaven" (Candlelight Mix) (ft. DJ Sammy & Yanou)	2003	4	4	—	—	—	—	—	—	—	—	
"Voorbij" (ft. Marco Borsato)	2004	1	2	—	—	—	—	—	—	—	—	
"Everyday It's Christmas" (ft. Trijntje Oosterhuis)	2004	7	—	—	—	—	—	—	—	—	—	
"Als Je Iets Kan Doen" (ft. Artiesten Voor Azie)	2005	1	—	—	—	—	—	—	—	—	—	
"On the Topshelf" (ft. Inge van Kemenade)	2008	25	—	—	—	—	—	—	—	—	—	
"Vijf jaar" (ft. Pieter van der Zweep)	2011	84	—	—	—	—	—	—	—	—	—	
"Ik Wacht Hier Op Jou" (ft. Tango Tinto)	2013	—	—	—	—	—	—	—	—	—	—	
"Habibi I Love You" (ft. Chawki & Pitbull)	2013	5	—	—	—	—	—	—	—	—	—	
"Blame It on Love" (ft. Michael Mendoza)	2014	—	—	—	—	—	—	—	—	—	—	
"Stil" (ft. Jim Bakkum)	2014	—	—	—	—	—	—	—	—	—	—	
"Kerstmis Vier Je Samen" (Various Artists)	2014	65	—	—	—	—	—	—	—	—	—	
"Degene Die Gaat" (ft. Mathieu & Guillaume)	2018	—	— (Note: "Degene Die Gaat" did not enter the Tipparade of Flanders, but did enter the Bubbling Under (as a Tip))	—	—	—	—	—	—	—	—	
"Stil In Mij (Verspijkerd)" (ft. Josylvio)	2018	23	—	—	—	—	—	—	—	—	—	
"—" denotes a single that did not chart or was not released in that territory.

== Awards and nominations ==
Award	Category	About	Result
2007
Dutch Musical Awards	Best Big Musical	Cast of Cinderella	Nominated
2006
TMF Awards The Netherlands	Best Dutch Female Artist	Herself	Nominated
2005
TMF Awards The Netherlands	Best Dutch Female Artist	Herself	Nominated
2004
Edison Awards	Best New Artist	Herself	Nominated
BMI Pop Award U.S.A	Best Pop	Herself	Won
TMF Awards The Netherlands	Best Dutch Female Artist	Herself	Won
2003
World Music Awards Monte Carlo, Monaco	Best Dutch Female Artist	Herself	Won
Dancestar Awards Miami, USA	Best single of the year	DJ Sammy & Yanou Ft. Dominique Rijpma van Hulst - Heaven	Won
TMF Awards The Netherlands	Best New Act	Herself	Won
