= Inglorious =

English band

- Origin: London, England
- Genres: Hard rock; heavy metal
- Years active: 2014-present
- Label: Frontiers Records
- Members: Nathan James; Colin Parkinson; Henry Rogers; Richard Shaw
- Website: inglorious.com

Inglorious are an England-based hard rock band formed in February 2014 in London by Nathan James. Their success has been particularly assisted by UK digital radio station Planet Rock and UK grassroots movement NWOCR. They released the album II on 12 May 2017, and in 2018 Inglorious released album 3 called Ride to Nowhere.

== History ==
=== Formation and debut album (2014–2016) ===
The band was formed in February 2014 by vocalist Nathan James, who had made a name for himself appearing in reality TV shows. James also sang for a time with Trans-Siberian Orchestra and worked with Scorpions guitarist Uli Jon Roth.

James was looking for like-minded musicians who desired to make rock music in a very honest fashion. He joined up with rhythm guitarist Wil Taylor, lead guitarist Drew Lowe, bassist Colin Parkinson, and drummer Phil Beaver - eventually gaining attention on YouTube with their live version of Deep Purple's classic “Burn”.

Drew Lowe left the band and was replaced with Birmingham guitarist Jack Edwards. Jack was then quickly released and replaced by Swedish guitarist Andreas Eriksson. Andreas joined the band a few weeks before the recording of their self-titled debut, “Inglorious”, which was released in February 2016. The band with help of radio station Planet Rock gathered a large social media following and toured Europe with The Winery Dogs, The Dead Daisies and as support act for the American hair-metal tribute band Steel Panther.

=== Inglorious II (2017–2018) ===
In early 2017, it was announced that Drew Lowe, the band's original guitarist, had rejoined the group as Taylor's replacement. The band released their second album titled Inglorious II in May 2017 and toured in support of the album from May to December 2017. They also supported Steel Panther in January 2018 and they appeared in European Festivals during the summer of 2018. In October 2018, after recording the third album “Ride to Nowhere”, Colin Parkinson, Andreas Eriksson and Drew Lowe all left the band.

In response, James lashed out at his former band mates in a video he posted to social media, saying that the band's music and lyrics were primarily his own creation.

=== New lineup, Ride to Nowhere, We Will Ride and Heroine (2018–2023) ===
In October 2018 Danny Dela Cruz joined the band, followed by Dan Stevens and Vinnie Colla in December 2018. The band's third album Ride to Nowhere was released on 25 January 2019. From January to December 2019, the new lineup toured in support of Ride to Nowhere. It was announced in early 2020 that the new lineup were scheduled to go into the studio to record their fourth album, but due to the COVID-19 pandemic, recording was delayed. They eventually recorded over the summer, and released the first single, "She Won't Let You Go", in November 2020, on the same day they announced the release date, track listing and info of their fourth album We Will Ride. The album was released on 12 February 2021. On 25 June 2021, the band announced a covers album titled Heroine with a scheduled release date of 10 September 2021. At the same time they announced the first single, a cover of Miley Cyrus' "Midnight Sky", which was released on 28 June 2021. The second single, a cover of Heart's song "Barracuda", was released on 28 July 2021. In late 2022 Phil Beaver left the band. In January 2023 Inglorious announced that they would be going on an indefinite hiatus.

=== V (2023–present) ===
In February 2025 James and former bassist Colin Parkinson announced that they had been working together again on new material. The resulting album, titled V, was released on 6 June 2025, with guitarist Richard Shaw and drummer Henry Rogers completing the line-up. The album release was supported by a four date tour of England and Wales, with a performance at Steelhouse Festival to follow on 27 July 2025.

== Members ==
- Nathan James – Vocals (2014–present)
- Colin Parkinson – Bass (2014–2018, 2023 - present)
- Henry Rogers (2025 - present)
- Richard Shaw (2025 - present)

=== Former band members ===
- Drew Lowe – Guitar (2014, 2017–2018)
- Andreas Eriksson – Guitar (2015–2018)
- Danny Dela Cruz - Guitar (2018 - 2023)
- Dan Stevens - Guitar (2018 - 2023)
- Vinnie Colla - bass (2018 – 2023)
- Phil Beaver - Drums (2014- 2022)

== Discography ==
=== Studio albums ===
- Inglorious (2016)
- Inglorious II (2017)
- Ride to Nowhere (2019)
- We Will Ride (2021)
- V (2025)

=== Cover albums ===
- Heroine (2021)

=== Live albums ===
- MMXXI Live at the Phoenix (2022)

=== Singles ===
- "Breakaway" (2015)
- "Until I Die" (2015)
- "High Flying Gypsy" (2016)
- "Girl Got a Gun" (2016)
- "Unaware" (2016)
- "Read All About It" (2017)
- "I Don't Need Your Loving" (2017)
- "Making Me Pay" (2017)
- "Hell or High Water" (2017)
- "Black Magic" (2017)
- "I Got a Feeling" (2018)
- "Where Are You Now?" (2018)
- "Ride to Nowhere" (2018)
- "I Don't Know You" (2019)
- "She Won't Let You Go" (2020)
- "Medusa" (2021)
- "Midnight Sky" (2021)
- "Barracuda" (2021)
- "I'm with You" (2021)
- "Testify" (2025)
- "Devil Inside" (2025)
- "Stand" (2025)

=== Music videos ===
- "Until I Die"
- "High Flying Gypsy" (lyric video)
- "Girl Got a Gun" (lyric video)
- "Unaware"
- "Read All About It" (lyric video)
- "I Don’t Need Your Loving"
- "Hell or High Water" (lyric video)
- "Taking the Blame"
- "Change Is Coming" (lyric video)
- "I Got a Feeling" (lyric video)
- "Where Are You Now?"
- "I Don't Know You"
- "Glory Days"
- "She Won't Let You Go"
- "Medusa"
- "Messiah"
- "Eye of the Storm" (lyric video)
- "Midnight Sky"
- "Barracuda"
- "Testify"
