= Albannach (album) =

Studio album by Albannach
- Released: 2006
- Genre: Celtic battle music
- Length: 34:12
- Label: Albannach Music
- Producer: Mick MacNeil

Albannach chronology
| Albannach (2006) | Eye of the Storm (2007) |

Albannach is the debut album of Scottish band Albannach. It was released in 2006.

== Track listing ==
| Track number | Track name | Length | Vocalist |
|---|---|---|---|
| 1 | "Unleash The Albannach" | 6:35 | None |
| 2 | "Burlin" | 3:46 | None |
| 3 | "In Bed With Quinsy" | 4:12 | None |
| 4 | "Ancestors" | 3:14 | Jacquie Holland |
| 5 | "Albacadabra" | 3:45 | None |
| 6 | "Claymores" | 3:40 | Jamesie Johnston |
| 7 | "Hooligans Holiday" | 4:19 | None |
| 8 | "The Wanted Man Of Barra" | 3:44 | None |
| 9 | "Rout Of Moy" | 4.34 | None |
| 10 | "A'Mhaighdeann Bharrach" (The Maiden Of Barra) | 2.49 | Catriona MacNeil |

== Credits ==
- Jamesie Johnston – Bass Drum, Vocals, Bodhrán
- Donnie MacNeill – Bagpipes, Drums, Percussion
- Jacquie Holland – Drums, Percussion, Vocals
- Kyle Gray – Lead Drums
- Aya Thorne – Bodhrán
- Davey 'Ramone' Morrison – Bodhrán, Vocals, Whistles
- Andy Malkin – Mixing, Programming
- Mick MacNeil – Recording
