= Sgt. MacKenzie =

2000 lament by Joseph Kilna MacKenzie

"Sgt. MacKenzie" is a lament written and sung by Joseph Kilna MacKenzie (1955-2009), in memory of his great-grandfather who was killed in combat during World War I. It has been used in the 2002 movie We Were Soldiers and the ending scene of the 2012 film End of Watch.

== History ==
Joseph MacKenzie wrote the haunting lament after the death of his wife, Christine, and in memory of his great-grandfather, Charles Stuart MacKenzie, a sergeant in the Seaforth Highlanders, who along with hundreds of his brothers-in-arms from the Elgin-Rothes area in Moray, Scotland went to fight in World War I. Sergeant MacKenzie was bayoneted to death at age 33, while defending one of his badly injured fellow soldiers during hand-to-hand trench warfare. MacKenzie was killed on 9 April 1917 during the Battle of Arras. He is buried in Highland Cemetery, Roclincourt in Pas-de-Calais, alongside other men from the 51st (Highland) Division.

The track was then included in his band Clann An Drumma's album Tried and True (2001). While working on the film We Were Soldiers (2002), director Randall Wallace received a CD of the album and was haunted by the emotion and spirit of reverence captured in "Sgt. MacKenzie". He arranged for Joe and his bandmate Donnie MacNeil, who played the pipes, to re-record "Sgt. MacKenzie" with the backing of an 80-piece orchestra and the United States Military Academy Choir at the famous Abbey Road Studios in London. The lament was introduced into the film during key scenes, with MacKenzie singing on his own, and on the last track of the film with the orchestra and choir. It is mistakenly believed the original version was in Scottish (Gaelic), but it was in Scots.

The original pipe score was written and played by Seoras Wallace, when Joe MacKenzie read his poem to him and Tu-Bardh Wilson in a house in Govan many years ago. The original recording is on the ClanWallace live album, and it was this recording that inspired Randall Wallace and Mel Gibson to contact Seoras about using the track on the film We Were Soldiers (2002).

== In later works ==
Child actor Atticus Shaffer was interested in the story of the actual soldier, so he dressed up as MacKenzie on Halloween. This was incorporated into his character, Brick, on The Middle, who does the same in a Halloween episode, then writes a hip-hop musical in a later episode based on MacKenzie's life and inspired by the hit Broadway musical Hamilton.

Beside the 2002 movie We Were Soldiers, the original song was also played during a scene in the film End of Watch (2012), starring Jake Gyllenhaal and Michael Peña. The song is also used in season 2 episode 1 of the military drama SIX.
