= I Will (Do song) =

Single by Do

from the album Follow Me
- Released: 24 February 2007
- Recorded: 2006
- Genre: Pop
- Length: 4:26
- Label: Sony/BMG
- Songwriter(s): Matthew Gerrard, Robbie Nevil, Bridget Benenate

Do singles chronology
"Sending Me Roses" (2006)	"I Will" (2007)	"Zingen in het Donker" (2010)

I Will is the fourth single from Dutch pop singer Do's second album Follow Me. Previously recorded by Bianca Ryan, the song was released in February 2007. Do has re-recorded it in Sweden to give the song more power. The song has previously been performed on the Dutch television channel RTL 4.

== Track listing ==
1. "I Will" – 4.14
2. "I Will (Instrumental)" – 4.14
3. "Living on a Fantasy (Live)" – 3.50

== Chart positions ==
Chart (2007)	Peak position
Netherlands (Dutch Top 40)	9
Netherlands (Single Top 100)	82
