= Mason Hill (band) =

Hard rock band

- Origin: Glasgow, Scotland
- Genres: Hard rock, alternative rock, alternative metal, post-grunge
- Years active: 2015-present
- Label: 7Hz Productions
- Members: Thomas Ward; James Bird; Marc Montgomery; Matthew Ward; Craig McFetridge
- Past members: Scott Taylor Mark Marshall

Mason Hill are a Scottish rock band, from Glasgow, who formed in 2015 officially. Coined by schoolmates James Bird and (former member)Scott Taylor in early 2013. They added Craig McFetridge shortly after (mid 2013) to the line up and in due course Matthew Ward joined ranks (2014) followed shortly after by Marc Montgomery (2015) to complete the band. After Taylor’s departure from the band in 2023 due to health concerns the band started their search for a replacement. In September 2025 Tom Ward officially joined Mason Hill publicly after working with the band for a year. Tom Ward is the current lead vocalist for Mason Hill.

They have released one studio album to date, Against the Wall (2021) plus an acoustic EP Unplugged (2020), which followed their debut EP, Mason Hill (2015).

== History ==
James Bird met (former member) Taylor at High school in Clydebank, Glasgow. They met drummer Craig McFetridge in 2013 through an online advert. Matthew Ward joined ranks in 2014 followed by Marc Montgomery in 2015.

In 2014 Bird, McFetridge and Taylor recorded their debut self titled EP Mason Hill at The Foundry in Motherwell with producer Sandy Jones.

In 2019, they launched a Kickstarter campaign for their debut album Against the Wall. It was eventually released in March 2021 with the album reaching number 19 on the UK Albums Chart, and number one on the UK Rock & Metal Chart.

The album was recorded at Riverside Studios in Busby, Glasgow by Duncan Cameron (producer) and assisted by David McClean, and mixed by Chris Sheldon.

In 2021, when the world briefly opened back up during the COVID-19 pandemic, the band went on an extensive UK tour selling over 7000 tickets. Mason Hill were one of the first tours back on the road.

In September 2023, the band announced Taylor had left the band due to health concerns. They had to cancel all remaining commitments and settle into a period of hiatus.

In September 2025, it was officially announced publicly that Tom Ward is now the vocalist for Mason Hill. The band had been working with Ward behind the scenes before the announcement for 12 months gearing up for the comeback with 2 sold out shows in London and Glasgow. The shows sold out in under 24 hours showing the appetite the band still holds in the UK rock scene.

== Members ==
Current members

- Thomas Ward – vocals
- James Bird – lead guitar
- Marc Montgomery – guitar
- Matthew Ward – bass guitar
- Craig McFetridge – drums

Former members

- Scott Taylor – vocals (2013–2023)
- Mark Marshall – bass (2014)

== Discography ==
=== Albums ===
- Against the Wall (7 Hz, 2021)
- Live in Glasgow (2022, live album)

=== EPs ===
- Mason Hill (2015)
- Unplugged (2020)

=== Singles ===
- "Against the Wall" (2020)
- "Find My Way" (2020)
- "DNA" (2021)
