= Albannach (band) =

Scottish band

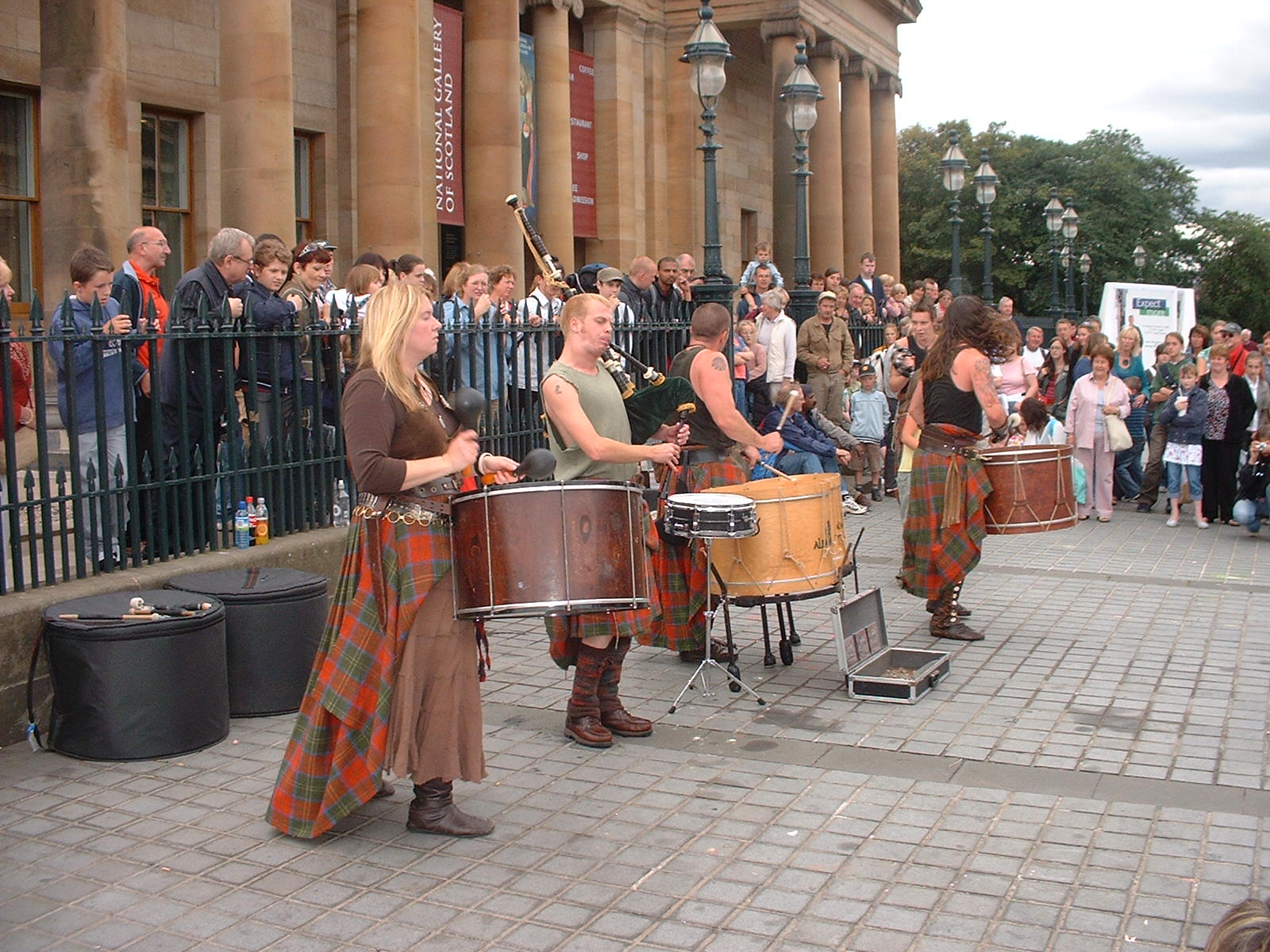
- Albannach live at the Edinburgh Festival, 2006

Background information
- Origin: Glasgow, Scotland
- Genres: Scottish traditional
- Years active: 2005–present
- Label: Albannach Music
- Spinoff of: Clann An Drumma
- Members: Jamesie Johnston; Donnie MacNeil; Jacquie Holland; Drew "DidgeriDrew" Reid; Nick Watson
- Website: www.albannachmusic.com

Albannach, Scottish Gaelic for "Scottish," is a band formed in 2005 in Glasgow, Scotland. Their traditional music is heavily percussive, driven by samba-like bass drums, bodhráns, and a single bagpipe. Albannach released their first album, the eponymous Albannach, in 2006. Since, the band has independently released four additional studio albums and frequently performs music at Highland games, Scottish festivals, and Celtic cultural events across North America and the United Kingdom. Albannach's discography is largely instrumental, though vocal songs are included in live shows, some sung in Scottish Gaelic.

After a 2011 show at the Glasgow Highland Games in Glasgow, Kentucky, band member Jamesie Johnston was stabbed in the midsection and leg by a drunk and belligerent fan, leading to his hospitalization. Johnston recovered, and the assailant was sentenced to 12 years for the first-degree assault.

== Members ==
=== Current members ===
- Donnie MacNeil – bag pipe, additional drums (2005–present)
- Jacquie Holland – lead vocals, bass rhythm drum (2005–present)
- Drew "DidgeriDrew" Reid – didgeridoo (2005–present)
- Nick Watson – drums (2019–present)

=== Former and intermittent members ===
- Jamesie Johnston – bass drum, backing vocals (2005–2026)
- Kyle Gray – drums (2005–2009)
- Colin Walker – drums (2009–2018)
- Aya Thorne – bodhrán, tambourine (2005–2015)
- Davey "Ramone" Morrison – bodhrán, backing baritone vocals (intermittent)

== Works ==
=== Discography ===
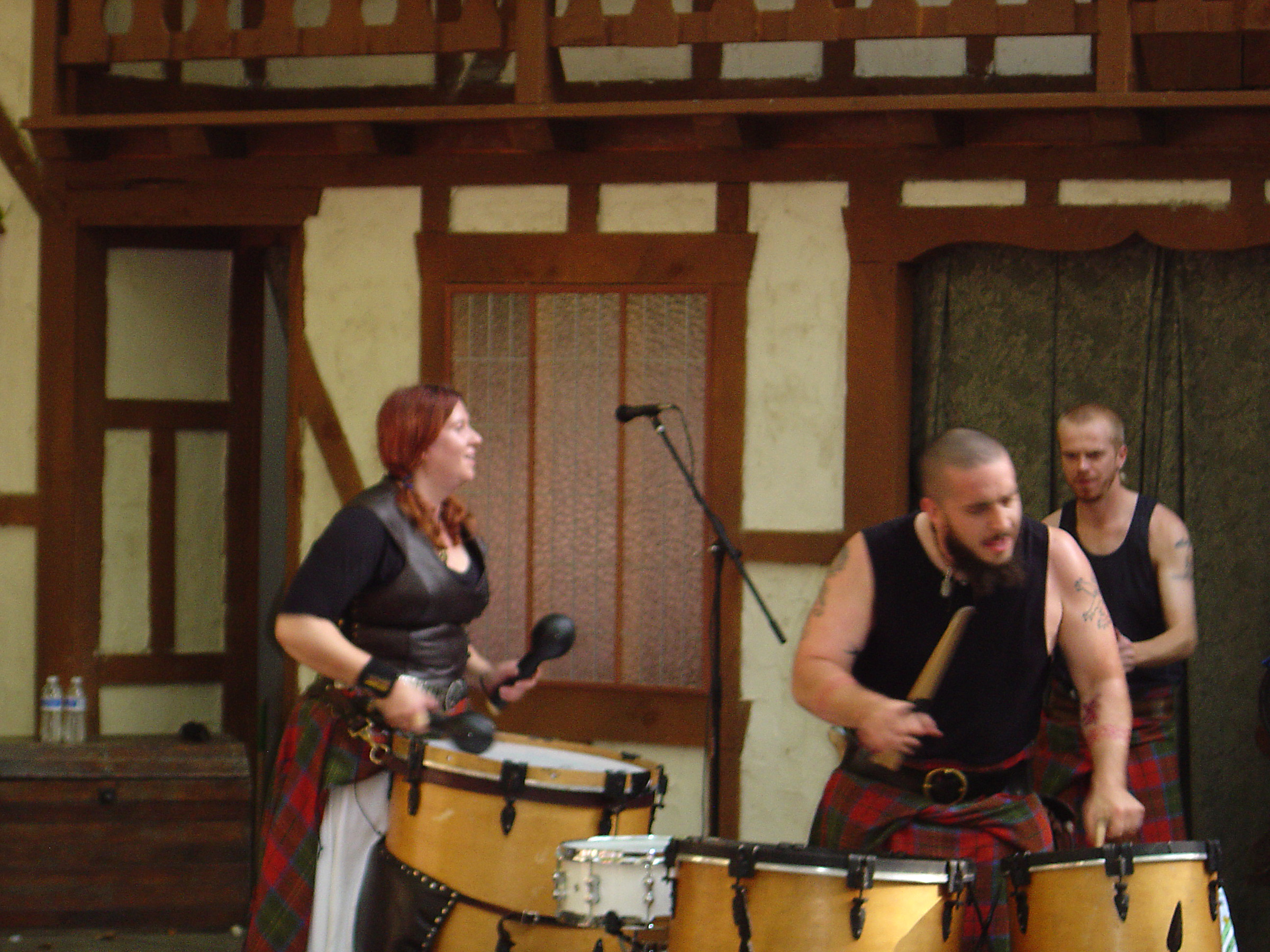
October 11, 2008 at the Maryland Renaissance Festival

==== Studio albums ====
- Albannach (2006)
- Eye of the Storm (2007)
- The Sub-Zero Sessions (EP) (2010)
- Bareknuckle Pipes & Drums (2011)
- Evolution (EP) (2016)
- Gaelgael (2019)

==== Live albums ====
- The Mighty Nach LIVE (2008)
- Runs In The Blood (2013)

=== Video ===
- Albannach Unleashed: Live At Grandfather Mountain (2006)
- Circa B.C. (2007)
- Scotumentary (2014)
