= Clann An Drumma =

Scottish musical ensemble

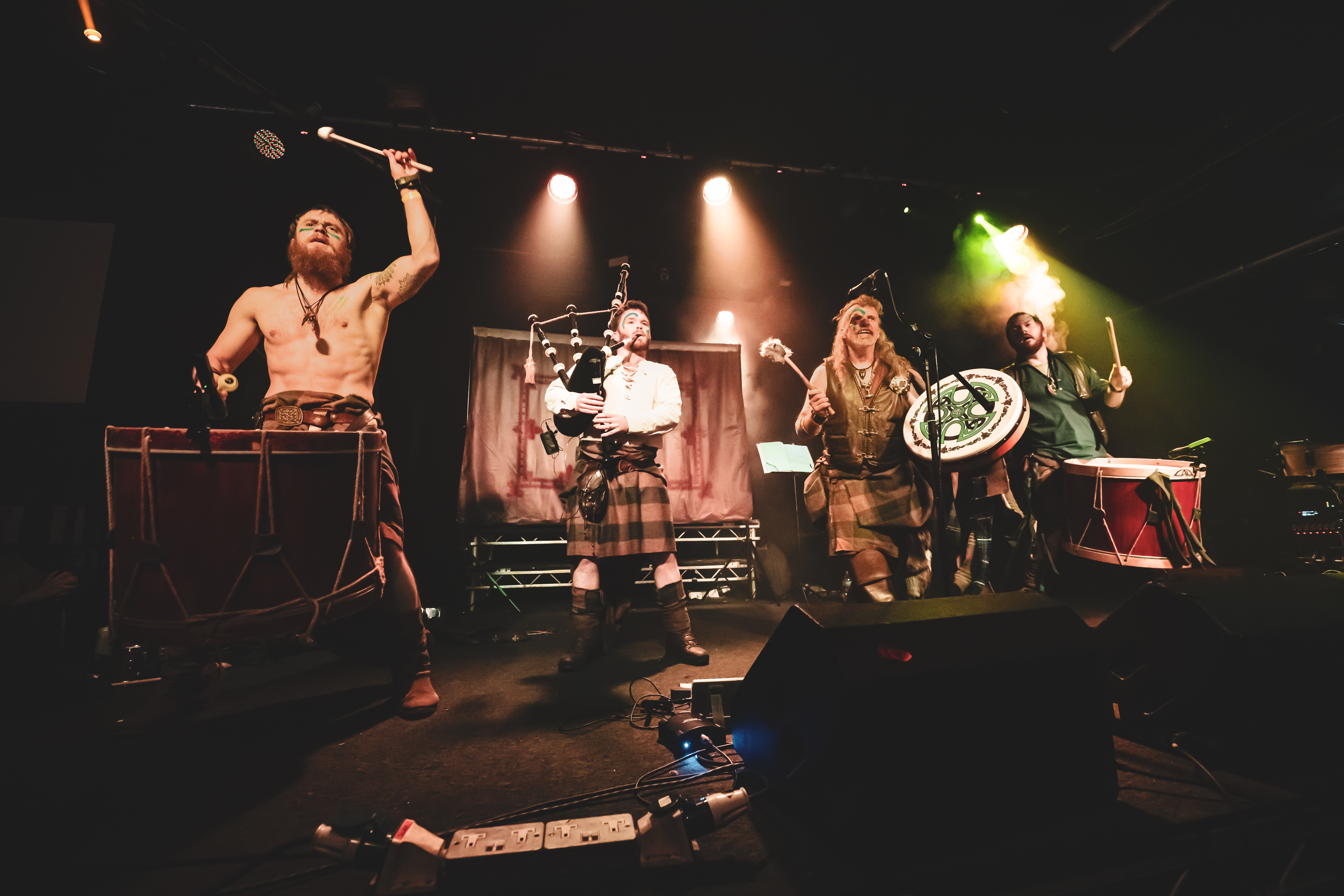
- Clann An Drumma performing at Slay, Glasgow on St. Andrew's Day 2025.

Background information
- Origin: Glasgow, Scotland
- Genres: Drums & pipes
- Years active: 2001–present
- Members: Alan Lamb; Grant MacLeod; Scott Kemp; Jamie Wilson
- Past members: Joe Kilna MacKenzie; Tu-Bardh Wilson; Jamesie Johnston; Jaquie Holland; Donnie MacNeil; Davy Morrison; Aya Thorne; Kyle Gray; Brian Cartwright; Wayne Manning; Robbie MacFarlane; Stevie Kirkpatrick; Maggie Kilna; Al Reid; Craig MacFarlane; Martin Brandon; Jamie Stewart; Davy Carney; Dougie Wilkinson
- Website: www.clannandrumma.co.uk

Clann An Drumma (Scots Gaelic for "Children of the Drum") is a band from Glasgow, Scotland. Their music involves heavy use of percussion and bagpipes. The band's motto is "Keep it Tribal". Their line-up has changed over the years and, as of 2023, the band has released seven studio albums. Clann An Drumma was formed by Joe Kilna MacKenzie (died 28 April 2009), Jacquie Holland, Tu-Bardh Stormcrow Wilson and others.

One of their better-known pieces is Sgt. MacKenzie, composed by Joe MacKenzie in memory of his great grandfather, Charles Stuart MacKenzie, who was killed in action during World War I. "Sgt. MacKenzie" is perhaps a departure from their usual style, its drumming and piping subdued and primarily a vocal piece. It was featured in the soundtrack to the films, We Were Soldiers (2002) and End of Watch (2012).

== Current members ==
- Alan Lamb – lead drums, snare drum, percussion
- Grant MacLeod – bagpipes
- Scott Kemp – bass drum
- Jamie Wilson – MC, percussion

== Discography ==
=== Studio albums ===
- Tried & True (2001)
- Keep It Tribal (2002)
- Tribal Eyes (2004)
- Tribal Heart (2007) – Re-recorded as Tribal Heart (Rebirth Edition) (2018)
- Bloodline (2013)
- Order of the Stag (2017)
- Boudica's Revenge (2023)

=== Live albums ===
- Tribal Waves (2004)
- Raw (2012)

=== Compilation albums ===
- Tribal Vortex (2004)
- The Gathering (2018)

== See also ==
- Albannach
