= Melanie C discography =

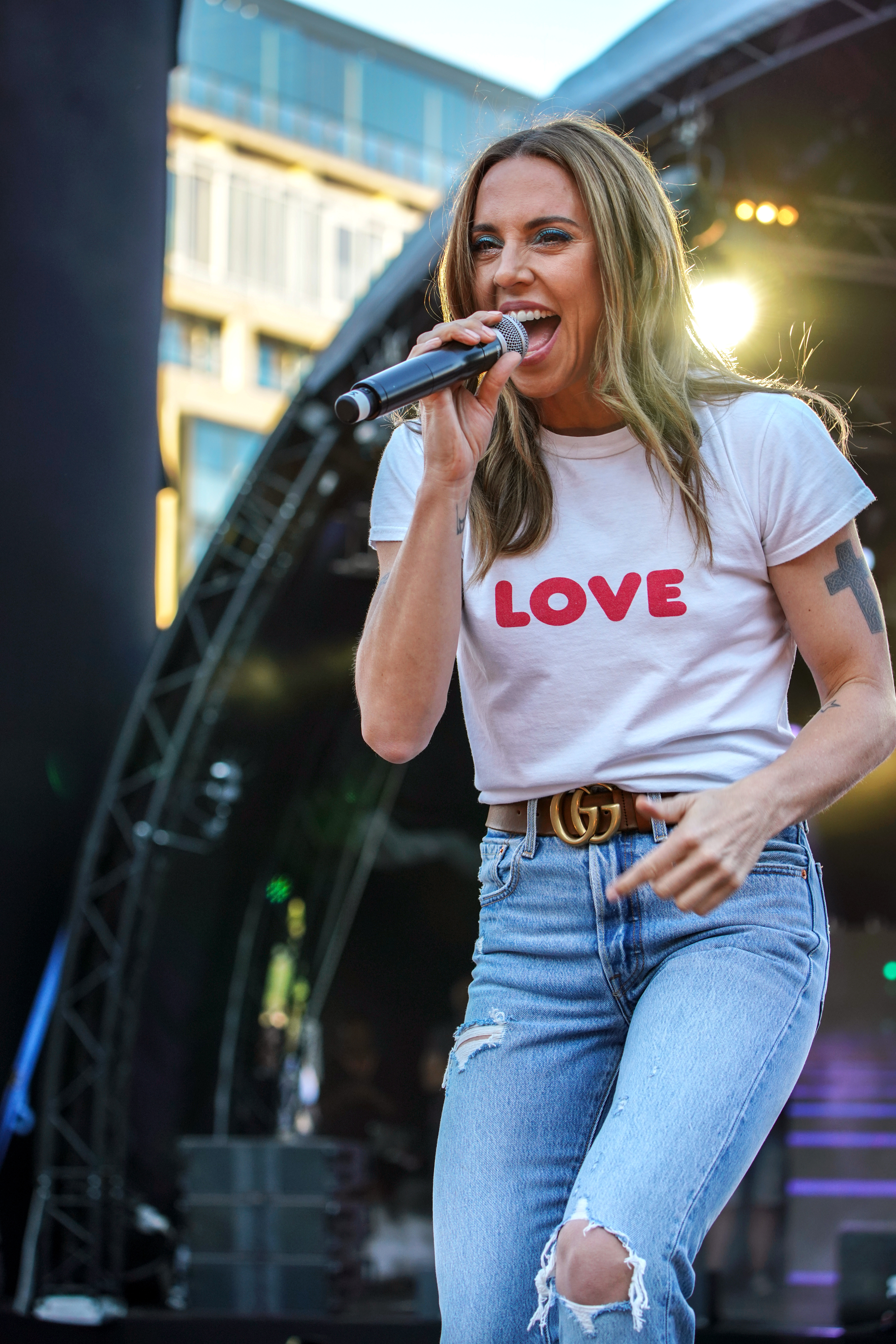
- Melanie C in 2018
- Studio albums: 9
- Live albums: 1
- Singles: 49
- Music videos: 43

The discography of Melanie C, an English pop singer, consists of nine studio albums, two extended plays, a live album, two remix albums, four video albums, 49 singles and 43 music videos. Chisholm began her solo career in late 1998 by singing with Canadian rock singer Bryan Adams on the song "When You're Gone". Chisholm's solo debut album Northern Star was released in 1999 and reached number four on the UK Albums Chart and was certified triple platinum by the British Phonographic Industry (BPI). The record experienced international success; it sold over 2.5 million albums worldwide. It produced four top fives and a top twenty single, two of which reached the number-one spot in the UK. Chisholm's second album, Reason, was released in March 2003. The album reached number five in the UK and produced one top-ten and one top-twenty single.

In 2004, Chisholm departed from Virgin and founded her own record company, Red Girl Records. Beautiful Intentions, her third album, was released in April 2005. It reached number twenty-four in the UK and number fifteen in Germany. The album produced three singles, one of which charted at number ten in the UK, and one peak at number one in different European charts. This Time, Chisholm's fourth album, was released in April 2007 and charted at fifty-seven on the UK Albums Chart. Of the five singles released from the album one charted at number-one in some parts of Europe, and one become a top-thirty in UK and a top ten in some European chart. In November, Melanie C reunited with the Spice Girls for a world tour and to release a greatest hits album. Melanie C released her fifth solo album, The Sea, on 2 September 2011, and her first EP The Night on 13 May 2012. Stages, a musical theatre-inspired album consisting of covers, was released on 10 September 2012. Melanie C's seventh album Version of Me was released on 21 October 2016 and reached number twenty-five on the UK Albums Chart. Chisholm's eighth studio album, Melanie C was released on 2 October 2020 and peaked at number eight, giving Melanie her third top 10 album in the UK. Chisholm followed this release in 2021 with acoustic promo singles for "Into You", "Too Much" and "Never Be the Same Again". On 3 September 2021, Chisholm released a deluxe version of her Melanie C album across all digital and streaming services. Chisholm premiered a video for her cover of "Touch Me" to accompany the new release. Chisholm's ninth studio album, Sweat, was released on 1 May 2026; the album preceded by four singles: the title track, "What Could Possibly Go Wrong?", "Undefeated Champion", and "Attitude".

Having co-written 11 UK number ones, more than any other female artist in chart history, she remains the only female performer to top the charts as a solo artist, as part of a duo, quartet and quintet. With twelve UK number one singles, including the charity single as part of The Justice Collective, she is the second female artist – and the first British female artist – with most singles at number one in the United Kingdom, and with a total of fourteen songs that have received the number one in Britain (including the double A-sides), Chisholm is the female artist with most songs at number one in the UK ranking history. Her work has earned her several awards and nominations, including a Guinness Book mention, three World Music Awards, five Brit Awards from 10 nominations, three American Music Awards, four Billboard Music Awards from six nomination, eight Billboard special awards, three MTV Europe Music Awards from seven nominations, one MTV Video Music Awards from two nomination, ten ASCAP awards, one Juno Award from two nominations, and four nominations at the Echo Awards.

== Albums ==
=== Studio albums ===
List of albums, with selected chart positions and certifications
Title	Album details	Peak chart positions										Certifications
Title	Album details	UK	AUS	AUT	BEL	GER	IRE	NLD	SCO	SWE	SWI	Certifications
Northern Star	Released: 18 October 1999; Formats: Cassette, CD, digital download, streaming; Label: Virgin	4	32	16	28	7	9	8	3	1	12	BPI: 3× Platinum; ARIA: Gold; BVMI: Platinum; IFPI SWI: Gold; IFPI SWE: Platinum
Reason	Released: 10 March 2003; Formats: Cassette, CD, digital download, streaming; Label: Virgin	5	71	39	—	13	47	62	9	38	21	BPI: Gold
Beautiful Intentions	Released: 11 April 2005; Formats: Cassette, CD, digital download, streaming; Label: Red Girl	24	—	12	90	15	—	98	9	31	14	BVMI: Gold; IFPI SWI: Gold
This Time	Released: 2 April 2007; Formats: CD, digital download, streaming; Label: Red Girl	57	—	26	92	15	—	—	66	48	8	IFPI SWI: Gold
The Sea	Released: 5 September 2011; Formats: CD, digital download, streaming; Label: Red Girl	45	—	38	—	16	—	—	69	—	13	
Stages	Released: 10 September 2012; Formats: CD, digital download, streaming; Label: Red Girl	50	—	—	—	—	83	—	79	—	—	
Version of Me	Released: 21 October 2016; Format: CD, digital download, streaming; Label: Red Girl	25	—	—	—	34	94	—	28	—	24	
Melanie C	Released: 2 October 2020; Format: Box set, cassette, CD, digital download, LP, streaming; Label: Red Girl	8	37	—	132	27	80	—	9	—	50	
Sweat	Released: 1 May 2026; Format: Cassette, CD, digital download, LP, streaming; Label: Red Girl, Virgin Music	3	5	44	41	52	— (Note: Sweat did not enter the Irish Albums Chart Top 100, but debuted at number 13 on the Irish Independent Albums Chart.)	—	2	—	25	
"—" denotes a recording that did not chart or was not released in that territory.

=== Live albums ===
List of live albums
Title	Album details
Live at Shepherd's Bush Empire	Released: 12 December 2013; Formats: digital download; Label: Red Girl

=== Video releases ===
List of video releases, with selected chart positions and certifications
Title	Album details	Peak chart positions
Title	Album details	UK Video
Live Hits	Released: 30 October 2006; Formats: DVD, digital download; Label: Red Girl	10
Live at the Hard Rock Cafe	Released: 29 June 2009; Formats: DVD, digital download; Label: Red Girl	22
The Sea – Live	Released: 27 February 2012; Formats: DVD, digital download; Label: Red Girl	—
"—" denotes a recording that did not chart or was not released in that territory.

== Extended plays ==
List of extended plays, with selected chart positions and certifications
Title	Details	Peak chart positions	
Title	Details	UK	UK Indie
The Night (with Jodie Harsh)	Released: 13 May 2012; Format: Digital download; Label: Red Girl	159	16

== Singles ==
=== As main artist ===
List of singles, with selected chart positions
Title	Year	Peak chart positions										Certifications	Album
Title	Year	UK	UK Indie	AUS	AUT	GER	IRE	ITA	NLD	SWE	SWI	Certifications	Album
"Goin' Down"	1999	4	—	25	—	—	—	37	64	—	—		Northern Star
"Northern Star"	1999	4	—	82	—	50	—	4	—	7	75	BPI: Silver; IFPI SWE: Gold	Northern Star
"Never Be the Same Again" (featuring Lisa "Left Eye" Lopes)	2000	1	—	2	3	5	3	6	1	1	3	BPI: Gold; ARIA: Platinum; IFPI AUT: Gold; BVMI: Gold; NVPI: Gold; IFPI SWE: Platinum; IFPI SWI: Gold	Northern Star
"I Turn to You"	2000	1	—	11	1	2	6	15	1	1	3	BPI: Gold; ARIA: Platinum; IFPI AUT: Gold; BVMI: Gold; NVPI: Gold; IFPI SWE: Gold	Northern Star
"If That Were Me"	2000	18	—	28	45	50	38	—	41	22	50		Northern Star
"Here It Comes Again"	2003	7	—	49	49	59	19	12	22	36	61		Reason
"On the Horizon"	2003	14	—	—	—	80	34	45	54	—	—		Reason
"Melt"	2003	27	—	—	—	—	—	—	—	—	—		Reason
"Yeh Yeh Yeh"	2003	27	—	—	—	63	—	38	—	—	—		Reason
"Next Best Superstar"	2005	10	—	41	45	32	37	21	28	31	25		Beautiful Intentions
"Better Alone"	2005	—	—	83	57	51	—	36	—	—	33		Beautiful Intentions
"First Day of My Life"	2005	—	—	65	2	1	—	32	94	9	1	BVMI: Platinum; IFPI AUT: Gold; IFPI SWI: Gold	Beautiful Intentions
"The Moment You Believe"	2007	—	—	—	28	15	—	—	—	18	14		This Time
"I Want Candy"	2007	24	—	—	—	—	—	9	—	—	—		This Time
"Carolyna"	2007	49	—	—	42	28	—	34	—	—	31		This Time
"This Time"	2007	94	—	—	—	69	—	—	—	—	—		This Time
"Understand"	2008	—	—	—	—	—	—	—	—	—	—		This Time
"Rock Me"	2011	—	—	—	—	38	—	—	—	—	—		The Sea
"Think About It"	2011	95	15	—	34	48	—	—	—	—	30		The Sea
"Weak"	2011	—	29	—	—	—	—	—	—	—	—		The Sea
"Let There Be Love"	2011	—	—	—	—	—	—	—	—	—	—		The Sea
"I Know Him So Well" (featuring Emma Bunton)	2012	153	14	—	—	—	—	—	—	—	—		Stages
"Loving You" (with Matt Cardle)	2013	14	2	—	—	—	42	—	—	—	—		Porcelain
"Anymore"	2016	— (Note: "Anymore" did not enter the Official UK Top 100 Chart, but peaked at number one on the Official Physical Singles Sales Chart Top 100 and at number 26 on the UK Radio Airplay Chart.)	—	—	—	—	—	—	—	—	—		Version of Me
"Dear Life"	2016	—	—	—	—	—	—	—	—	—	—		Version of Me
"Hold On" (featuring Alex Francis)	2017	—	—	—	—	—	—	—	—	—	—		Version of Me
"Room for Love"	2017	— (Note: "Room for Love" did not enter the Official UK Top 100 Chart, but peaked at number two on the Official Physical Singles Sales Chart Top 100.)	—	—	—	—	—	—	—	—	—		Version of Me
"High Heels" (featuring Sink the Pink)	2019	— (Note: "High Heels" did not enter the Official UK Top 100 Chart, but peaked at number 90 on the Official Singles Sales Chart Top 100.)	—	—	—	—	—	—	—	—	—		Non-album single
"Who I Am"	2020	— (Note: "Who I Am" did not enter the Official UK Top 100 Chart, but peaked at number 27 on the Official Singles Sales Chart Top 100.)	—	—	—	—	—	—	—	—	—		Melanie C
"Blame It on Me"	2020	— (Note: "Blame It on Me" did not enter the Official UK Top 100 Chart, but debuted and peaked at number 66 on the Official Singles Sales Chart Top 100.)	—	—	—	—	—	—	—	—	—		Melanie C
"In and Out of Love"	2020	— (Note: "In and Out of Love" did not enter the Official UK Top 100 Chart, but debuted and peaked at number 97 on the Official Singles Downloads Chart Top 100 on 9 October 2020.)	—	—	—	—	—	—	—	—	—		Melanie C
"Fearless" (featuring Nadia Rose)	2020	—	—	—	—	—	—	—	—	—	—		Melanie C
"Into You"	2020	—	—	—	—	—	—	—	—	—	—		Melanie C
"Touch Me"	2021	—	—	—	—	—	—	—	—	—	—		Melanie C
"Girl" (with Anna Lunoe)	2025	—	—	—	—	—	—	—	—	—	—		Pearl
"Sweat"	2025	— (Note: "Sweat" did not enter the UK Singles Chart Top 100, but debuted at number 10 on the UK Singles Downloads Chart, and at number 11 on the UK Singles Sales Chart.)	—	— (Note: "Sweat" did not enter the ARIA Top 100 Singles Chart, but debuted at number 22 on the ARIA digital chart.)	—	—	—	—	—	—	—		Sweat
"What Could Possibly Go Wrong?"	2026	— (Note: "What Could Possibly Go Wrong?" did not enter the UK Singles Chart, but debuted at number 40 on the UK Singles Downloads Chart.)	—	—	—	—	—	—	—	—	—		Sweat
"Undefeated Champion"	2026	—	—	—	—	—	—	—	—	—	—		Sweat
"Attitude"	2026	— (Note: "Attitude" did not enter the UK Singles Chart, but debuted at number 99 on the Official UK Singles Downloads Chart.)	—	—	—	—	—	—	—	—	—		Sweat
"—" denotes a recording that did not chart or was not released in that territory.

=== As featured artist ===
List of singles, with selected chart positions
Title	Year	Peak chart positions										Certifications	Album
Title	Year	UK	AUS	AUT	GER	IRE	NLD	NOR	SCO	SWE	SWI	Certifications	Album
"When You're Gone" (Bryan Adams featuring Melanie C)	1998	3	4	14	14	3	6	6	2	8	11	BPI: 2× Platinum; ARIA: Platinum; IFPI NOR: Gold	On a Day Like Today
"He Ain't Heavy, He's My Brother" (among The Justice Collective)	2012	1	—	—	—	4	—	17	2	—	—	BPI: Gold	Non-album single
"Cool as You" (Peter Aristone featuring Melanie C)	2014	—	—	—	—	—	—	—	—	—	—		19 Days in Tetbury
"Let's Groove" (among Asia's Got Talent judges)	2015	—	—	—	—	—	—	—	—	—	—		Non-album singles
"Cosmic Shower (Lost Humanity)" (The Kandu Collective featuring Melanie C)	2016	—	—	—	—	—	—	—	—	—	—		Non-album singles
"Numb" (Sons of Sonix featuring Melanie C)	2016	—	—	—	—	—	—	—	—	—	—		Version of Me
"Stop Crying Your Heart Out" (as BBC Radio 2's Allstars)	2020	7	—	—	—	—	—	—	—	—	—		Non-album singles
"AM Gold (Tobtok Remix)" (Train featuring Melanie C)	2022	—	—	—	—	—	—	—	—	—	—		Non-album singles
"Call Me a Lioness" (Hope FC featuring Olivia Dean, Melanie C, Al Greenwood, Self Esteem, Ellie Rowsell, Marika Hackman, Rachel Chinouriri, Shura, Jasmine Jetwa, Rose Gray, and Highlyy)	2023	— (Note: "Call Me a Lioness" did not enter the UK Singles Chart Top 100 but peaked at number 67 on the UK Singles Downloads Chart.)	—	—	—	—	—	—	—	—	—		Non-album singles
"—" denotes a recording that did not chart or was not released in that territory.

=== Promotional singles ===
List of singles, with selected chart positions
Title	Year	Peak chart positions	Album
Title	Year	UK Indie	Album
"Ga Ga"	1999	—	Northern Star
"Let's Love"	2003	—	Reason
"Don't Need This"	2006	—	Beautiful Intentions
"Set You Free" (with Jodie Harsh)	2012	16	The Night EP
"I Don't Know How to Love Him"	2012	20	Stages
"Overload"	2020	—	Melanie C
"Into You" (acoustic)	2021	—	Non-album singles
"Too Much" (acoustic)	2021	—	Non-album singles
"Never Be the Same Again" (acoustic)	2021	—	Non-album singles
"Who I Am" (acoustic)	2021	—	Non-album singles
"In and Out of Love" (acoustic)	2021	—	Non-album singles
"I Turn to You" (acoustic)	2021	—	Non-album singles
"Free Yourself" (remix) (with Jessie Ware)	2022	—	Non-album singles
"Girl" (IsGwan remix) (with Anna Lunoe)	2025	—	Non-album singles
"Sweat" (Guz remix)	2026	—	Non-album singles
"Drum Machine"	2026	—	Sweat
"—" denotes releases that did not chart or were not released in that territory.

== Other appearances ==
Title	Year	Other(s) artist(s)	Album
"Ga Ga"	1999	—N/a	Big Daddy: Music from the Motion Picture
"Suddenly Monday"	2000	—N/a	Original Soundtrack Featuring Music from and Inspired by the film Maybe Baby
"Go!"	2000	—N/a	Whatever It Takes: Original Soundtrack
"Barcelona"	2001	Russell Watson	The Voice – Live
"Aren't You Kind of Glad We Did?"	2001	—N/a	The Voice – Live
"Independence Day"	2002	—N/a	Bend It Like Beckham: Music from the Motion Picture
"Tanha Dil (Remix)"	2003	Shaan	Aksar
"Out of This World"	2011	Jools Holland	Jools Holland & Friends
"Viva Life"	2011	—N/a	Bash Street
"You're All I Need to Get By"	2012	Alfie Boe	The Bring Him Home Tour
"Come What May"	2012	Alfie Boe	The Bring Him Home Tour
"Ain't Got No, I Got Life"	2014	—N/a	Beautiful Cover Versions
"I Wish"	2014	Jools Holland's Rhythm and Blues Orchestra	Sirens of Song
"Around the World"	2018	Alex Christensen	Classical 90s Dance 2
"Don't Talk Just Kiss"	2018	Alex Christensen	Classical 90s Dance 2
"I Like U" (Emergency_Loop X Melanie C Remix)	2023	Tove Lo	Non-album single
"First"	2025	Rose Gray	A Little Louder, Please
"I Don't Wanna Know"	2026	Roger Sanchez	Spectrum

== Music videos ==
=== Main artist ===
Main artist music videos
Title	Director(s)	Originating album	Year	Ref.
"Goin' Down"	Giuseppe Capotondi	Northern Star	1999	
"Northern Star"	Steven Green	Northern Star	1999	
"Never Be the Same Again"	Francis Lawrence	Northern Star	2000	
"I Turn to You"	Cameron Casey	Northern Star	2000	
"If That Were Me"	Cameron Casey	Northern Star	2000	
"Here It Comes Again"	Charles Infante	Reason	2003	
"On the Horizon"	Howard Greenhalgh	Reason	2003	
"Yeh Yeh Yeh"	Ray Kay	Reason	2003	
"Melt"	Jamie Vickery	Reason	2003	
"Next Best Superstar"	Ray Kay	Beautiful Intentions	2005	
"Better Alone"	Mary McCartney	Beautiful Intentions	2005	
"First Day of My Life"	Nikolaj Georgiew	Beautiful Intentions	2005	
"Better Alone" (second version)	Robert Broellochs	Beautiful Intentions	2006	
"The Moment You Believe"	Tim Royes	This Time	2007	
"I Want Candy"	Tim Royes	This Time	2007	
"Carolyna"	Tim Royes	This Time	2007	
"This Time"	Adrian Moat	This Time	2007	
"Understand"	Avi Diamond and Jamie Milligan	This Time	2008	
"We Love to Entertain You"	Misc.	This Time	2010	
"Rock Me"	Marcus Sternberg	The Sea	2011	
"Think About It"	Howard Greenhalgh	The Sea	2011	
"Weak"	Michael Baldwin	The Sea	2011	
"Let There Be Love"	Marcus Gerwinat	The Sea	2011	
"I Know Him So Well"	N/A	Stages	2012	
"Loving You"	Jonny Kight	Porcelain	2013	
"Anymore"	David East	Version of Me	2016	
"Dear Life"	David East	Version of Me	2016	
"Hold On"	N/A	Version of Me	2017	
"Room for Love"	Misc.	Version of Me	2017	
"High Heels"	Sylvie Weber	N/A	2019	
"Who I Am"	Sylvie Weber	Melanie C	2020	
"Blame It on Me"	Sylvie Weber	Melanie C	2020	
"In and Out of Love"	Graham Cruz	Melanie C	2020	
"Fearless"	Graham Cruz	Melanie C	2020	
"Into You"	Graham Cruz	Melanie C	2021	
"Touch Me"	N/A	Melanie C	2021	
"Sweat"	Graham Cruz	Sweat	2025	
"Drum Machine"	Graham Cruz	Sweat	2026	

=== As featured artist ===
Featured artist music videos
Title	Other performer(s)	Director(s)	Year	Ref.
"When You're Gone"	Bryan Adams	Marcus Nispel	1998	
"He Ain't Heavy, He's My Brother"	The Justice Collective	N/A	2012	
"Cool as You"	Peter Aristone	Anton van der Linden	2014	
"Around the World (La La La La La)"	Alex Christensen & The Berlin Orchestra	N/A	2018	
"Don't Talk Just Kiss"	Alex Christensen & The Berlin Orchestra	N/A	2018	

=== Guest appearance ===
Guest appearance music videos
Title	Other performer(s)	Director(s)	Year	Ref.
"Word Up"	Little Mix	Ben Turner	2014	
"Hard Girls"	KT Tunstall	Chris Turner	2016	
"Love is Back"	Celeste	Sammy King	2021	

== Writing credits ==
List of songs written by Chisholm with and for other artists.
Title	Year	Artist	Album
"(Hey You) Free Up Your Mind"	1999	Emma Bunton	Pokémon: The First Movie
"Help Me Help You"	2002	Holly Valance	Footprints
"La Via"	2005	Massimo Di Cataldo	Sulla Mia Strada
"Follow Me"	2006	Do	Follow Me
"The Best Is Yet To Come"	2007	Lee Mead	Lee Mead
