= Melanie C =

British pop singer (born 1974)

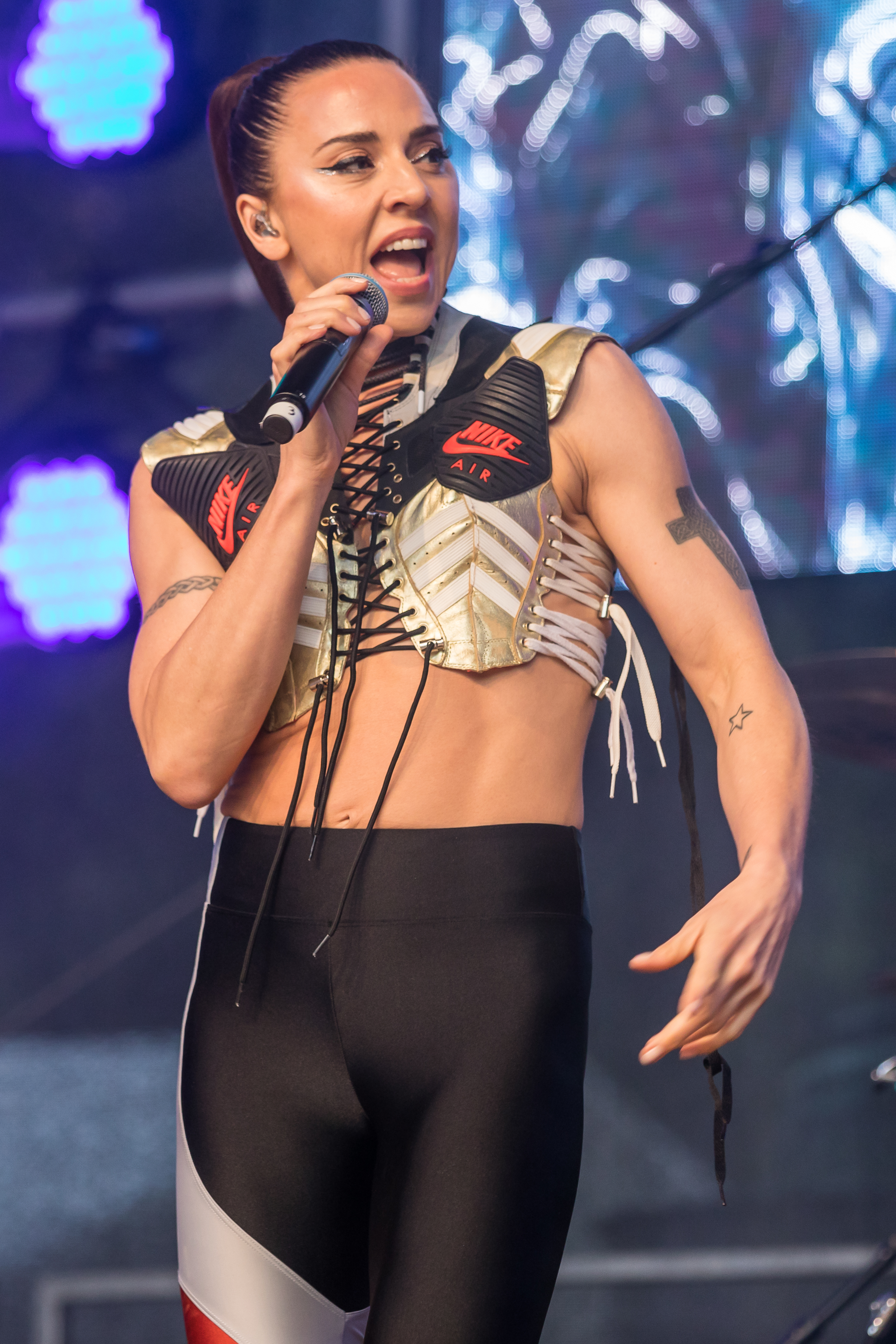
- Melanie C in 2019
- Born: Melanie Jayne Chisholm; 12 January 1974 (age 52); Whiston, Lancashire, England
- Other names: Mel C; Sporty Spice
- Occupations: Singer; songwriter; DJ
- Spouse: Chris Dingwall (m. 2026)
- Partner: Thomas Starr (2002–2012)
- Children: 1
- Relatives: Paul O'Neill (half-brother)
- Musical career
- Genres: Pop; rock; dance; electronic
- Instrument: Vocals
- Years active: 1994–present
- Labels: Virgin; Red Girl; Virgin Music
- Formerly of: Spice Girls
- Website: melaniec.net

Melanie Jayne Chisholm (born 12 January 1974), commonly known as Melanie C or Mel C, is an English singer and songwriter. She rose to fame in the mid-1990s as a member of the pop group the Spice Girls, in which she was nicknamed Sporty Spice. With over 100 million records sold worldwide, the Spice Girls are the best-selling female group of all time. The group went on an indefinite hiatus in 2000, before reuniting for a greatest hits album (2007) and two concert tours: the Return of the Spice Girls (2007–2008) and Spice World (2019). She is known for her unique and distinctive tone and her vocal ability.

Chisholm began a solo career in late 1998 on the single "When You're Gone" with Canadian rock singer Bryan Adams. She signed with Virgin Records to release her debut solo album Northern Star (1999), which spawned two UK number one singles, "Never Be the Same Again" and "I Turn to You". The album has sold over 4 million copies worldwide, as of 2026. After the release of her second album, Reason (2003), Chisholm parted ways with Virgin Records and founded her own record company, Red Girl Records. Her third album, Beautiful Intentions (2005), was a commercial success in Europe and spawned the singles "Next Best Superstar" and "First Day of My Life". Her fourth album, This Time (2007), sold over 300,000 copies worldwide. Chisholm's later albums consist of The Sea (2011), Stages (2012), Version of Me (2016), and Melanie C (2020). Her ninth solo studio album, Sweat, was released on 1 May 2026, which debuted at number three on the UK Albums Chart, becoming the singer's highest-charting solo album, and the highest-charting solo album by a member of the Spice Girls.

Chisholm is the recipient of numerous accolades, including three World Music Awards, five Brit Awards, three American Music Awards, four Billboard Music Awards, three MTV Europe Music Awards, one MTV Video Music Award, ten ASCAP awards, and one Juno Award. Her 2000 single "I Turn to You" won the Grammy Award for Best Remixed Recording, Non-Classical for the Hex Hector's remix. In 2009, Chisholm made her stage debut in the West End musical Blood Brothers, for which she was nominated for a Laurence Olivier Award. She has sold over 130 million records in her career and has earned over 339 worldwide certifications, including 46 Silver, Gold, and Platinum certifications as a solo artist.

== Early life ==
Melanie Jayne Chisholm was born on 12 January 1974 in Whiston, Lancashire, (Note: Whiston was in Lancashire before being moved to Merseyside on 1 April 1974.) the daughter of singer Joan Tuffley Chisholm O'Neill (who also worked as a secretary and personal assistant), and Otis Elevator Company fitter, Alan William Chisholm. Her parents married in 1971 and separated in 1978, when Melanie was four years old. Her mother remarried and had more children, one of whom is racing driver Paul O'Neill. Melanie grew up in Widnes, Cheshire, attending Brookvale Junior School in nearby Runcorn and Fairfield High School in Widnes. She studied for a diploma in singing, dancing, and musical theatre at the Doreen Bird College of Performing Arts in London, leaving just short of completing her three-year course and later gaining teaching qualifications in tap and modern theatre dance with the Imperial Society of Teachers of Dancing.

== Career ==
=== 1994–2000: Spice Girls ===
In 1994, Chisholm was one of around 400 women to respond to an advertisement in The Stage magazine placed by Chris and Bob Herbert, who were looking to form a new girl group which would later become the Spice Girls. Chisholm, along with Melanie Brown, Geri Halliwell, and Victoria Adams, were originally chosen as the members of the group, which became a quintet with the addition of Emma Bunton. Insecure about the lack of a contract and frustrated by the direction of Chris and Bob Herbert's Heart Management, the group severed ties with the Herberts. In 1995, they negotiated with record labels in London and Los Angeles and eventually signed a deal with Virgin. Their debut album, Spice, was a huge worldwide commercial success, peaked at number 1 in more than 17 countries across the world, and was certified multi-Platinum in 27 countries. Conceptually, the album centred on the idea of Girl Power, and during that time was compared to Beatlemania. In total the album sold 30 million copies worldwide, becoming the biggest-selling album in music history by a girl group and one of the most successful albums of all time. The first single, "Wannabe" reached number 1 in 37 countries, and their subsequent singles – "Say You'll Be There", "2 Become 1", "Who Do You Think You Are" and "Mama" – all peaked at number 1 in the UK.

In 1997, they released their second album, Spiceworld, with the two first singles "Spice Up Your Life" and "Too Much", entering the UK Albums Chart at number 1. The album was a global best seller, selling 20 million copies worldwide. The group also starred in their own film, Spiceworld: The Movie, which grossed $100 million at the box office worldwide and became the second most watched movie of the year. The next single, "Stop", peaked at number two, their only single to not reach the top of the charts. "Viva Forever", another number 1, was the last single before Halliwell's departure from the group in May 1998. With four members, the group released "Goodbye", before Christmas in 1998 and when it topped the UK Singles Chart it became their third consecutive number 1 Christmas song – equalling the record previously set by the Beatles. On 30 November, Canadian artist Bryan Adams, released "When You're Gone" with featured vocals of Chisholm, her debut solo project. The song peaked at number 3 on the UK Singles Chart, spent fifteen weeks in the Top 40 and received the Platinum certification.

=== 1999–2003: Northern Star and Reason ===
In 1999, Chisholm signed with Virgin and, during the summer, recorded the album Northern Star. She recorded "Ga Ga" from the soundtrack of the film Big Daddy. The song was released as promotional single on 25 June, only in the UK. She also co-wrote and recorded the backing vocals for "(Hey You) Free Up Your Mind", sung by Emma Bunton from the film soundtrack Pokémon: The First Movie. On 27 September, Chisholm released her debut single, "Goin' Down" and peaked at number 4 in the UK and 25 in Australia. The music video was shot in Los Angeles and directed by Giuseppi Capotondi. Her debut album, Northern Star, was released on 18 October 1999, peaked at number 4 and sold four million copies worldwide, received triple Platinum in the UK, and another seven certifications, including Platinum in Germany and Sweden. "Northern Star" was released as a second single and also peaked at number 4. To promote the album, Chisholm embarked on a tour called From Liverpool to Leicester Square, travelling to Australia, the US, Canada, Japan, the UK, Germany, Italy, Spain, France, Netherlands and Denmark, between 27 September and 1 November. In 2000, Chisholm had two songs in film soundtracks, "Suddenly Monday" in Maybe Baby and "Go!" in Whatever It Takes.

Her next single, "Never Be the Same Again", was a contemporary R&B song. The song, which features TLC member Lisa "Left Eye" Lopes, was released on 20 March 2000 and became Chisholm's first number 1 single. It received Gold certification in the UK and also peaked at number 1 in Netherlands, New Zealand, Norway, Scotland and Sweden. The song was the eighteenth best-selling song of 2000 and sold more than a million copies across Europe. After the success of "Never Be the Same Again", the label decided to release two more singles. On 7 August 2000, Virgin released a remix version of "I Turn to You" as the fourth single; the song became her second number 1 in the UK, Netherlands and Sweden. "I Turn to You" also peaked at number 1 in Austria, Denmark and Dance Club Songs of United States. "If That Were Me" was released as the fifth and final single and peaked at number 18. The proceeds from its sale went to the Kandu Arts charity. The North American version of Northern Star was released on 21 August 2000 and included the single versions of "Never Be The Same Again" and "I Turn To You". In late 2000, after the first solo work of members, the Spice Girls released their third and final album, Forever, sporting a new edgier R&B sound. "Holler" and "Let Love Lead the Way" were released as singles on 23 October 2000 and the songs reached number 1 in the UK. The album sold 5 million copies. The group announced that they were beginning an indefinite hiatus. In the same year, the Chinese singer FanFan recorded a Chinese version of "Suddenly Monday" from her debut album FanFan's World.

Chisholm embarked in her first world tour, the Northern Star Tour, between late 2000 and 26 August 2001, to promote her debut album. The tour travelled in 76 dates, 30 countries and 4 continents, just not going to Oceania and South America. The Shepherd's Bush Empire concert was webcast on Chisholm's original website with a special appearance of Bryan Adams. On 4 April 2001, The audio of the Anaheim concert also was webcast on House of Blues' website. In 2001, Chisholm collaborated in the live album of Russell Watson, The Voice – Live, as featured vocals in the songs "Barcelona" and "Aren't You Kind of Glad We Did?".

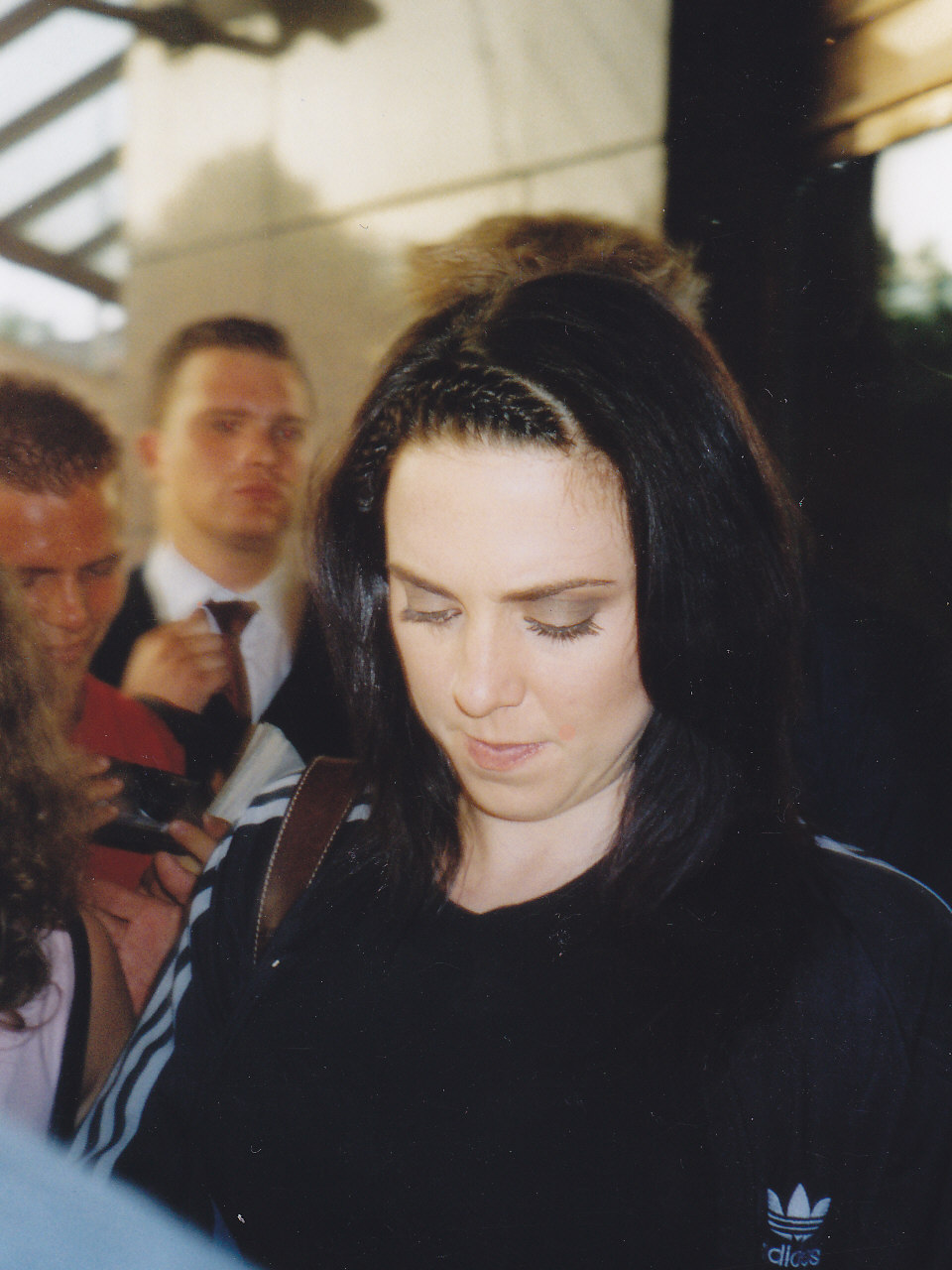
Chisholm in 2003

Chisholm began recording her second album in November 2001. She travelled to the United States to record some songs. During this time, she also recorded "Independence Day" from the film soundtrack Bend It Like Beckham and wrote "Help Me Help You" for Holly Valance, included in her album Footprints. Chisholm, along with Anastacia made an appearance at the 2002 MTV Europe Music Awards to present the award for "Best Song", which was given to P!nk.

Chisholm's second album was postponed to 10 March 2003. Chisholm also took time out due to struggles with clinical depression. On 24 February 2003 the first single from her new album was released, "Here It Comes Again", which reached number 7 in the UK and peaked in the top 20 in Spain and Ireland. She released her second studio album, Reason, on 10 March 2003 and it peaked at number 5, received Gold certification in the UK. The label sent Chisholm to promote the album, including several pocket shows. On 24 April 2003, she embarked in the Reason Tour, travelling only in Europe. The second single, "On the Horizon", was released on 2 June 2003. After the previous single, music critics were predicting that this single would redeem Chisholm's chart success, but the song peaked at number 14 and did not help sales.

"Let's Love", was released as a single exclusively in Japan and used for a Toyota commercial. Alongside promoting the album, Chisholm competed on the reality sports game show The Games. On 11 September 2003, during a taping of The Games, Chisholm competed in a judo match with Turkish-Dutch actress Azra Akin, which resulted in Chisholm injuring her knee. Because of this, the song "Yeh Yeh Yeh", which was planned to be released as the third and final single on 22 September 2003, had to be pushed back because she could not fully promote an upbeat song with an injury. "Melt" was then chosen to be launched along with "Yeh Yeh Yeh" as a double A-side, because she could do a small number of performances. The double single was released on 10 November 2003. The song peaked at number 27. In other countries of Europe, "Melt" wasn't released, only "Yeh Yeh Yeh" as a solo release. After the release of "Melt/Yeh Yeh Yeh", Chisholm added some extra dates to the Reason Tour, and the Avo Session Basel concert was broadcast on 3sat.

=== 2004–2006: Red Girl Records and Beautiful Intentions ===
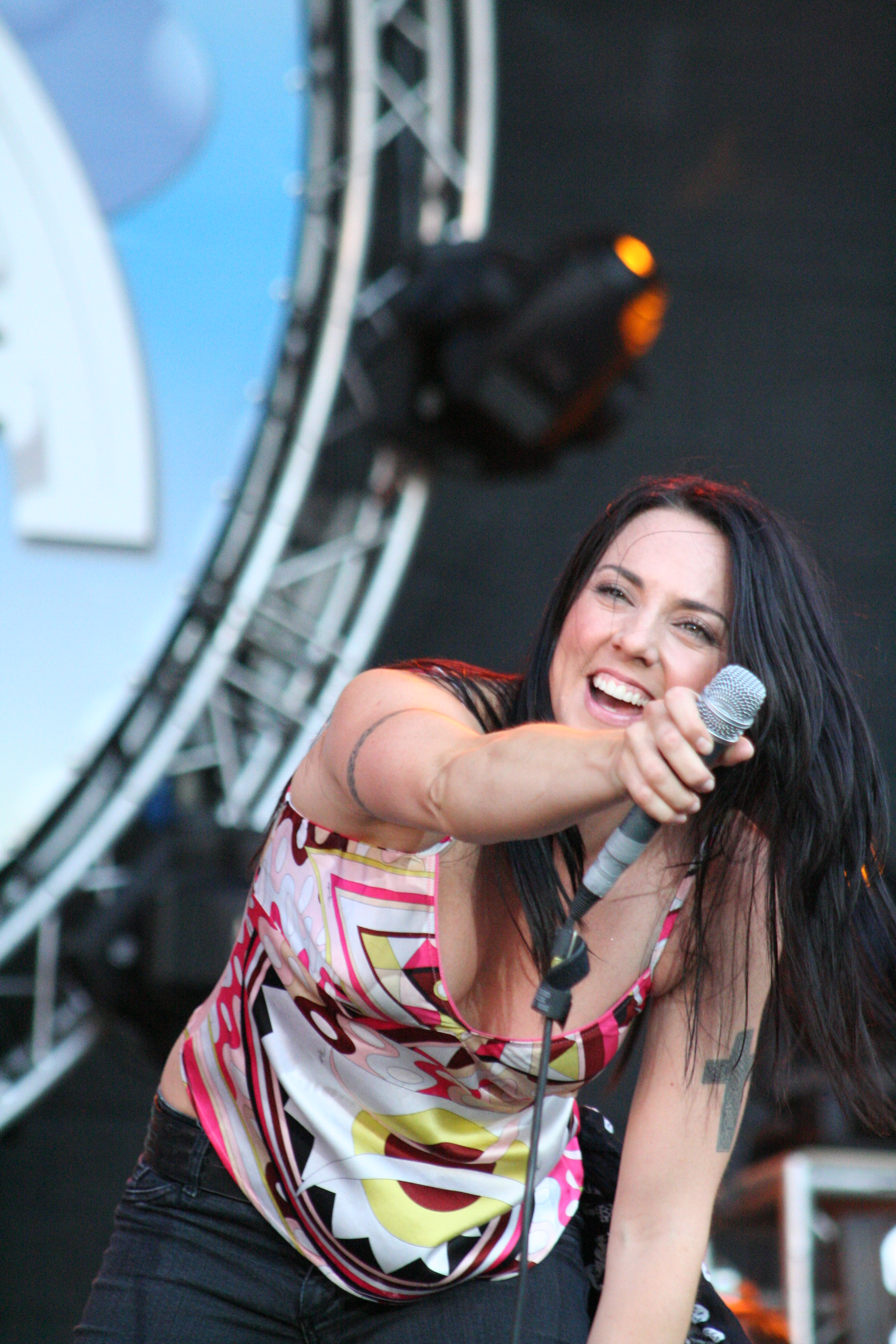
Chisholm performing in Germany in 2006

On 1 January 2004, Virgin Records dismissed Chisholm after the conflict in previous years about the direction in her solo career. In April 2004, she founded her own label, Red Girl Records, to record and release her own projects. All of Chisholm's activities are decided upon and funded by herself. The label name was inspired by the colours of the football club Liverpool, of which Chisholm is a supporter. Nancy Phillips, who had been Chisholm's manager and business partner since the label's inception, retired in 2017.

In June 2004, she embarked in a five-date concert tour, The Barfly Mini-Tour, performed in The Barfly music halls, a series of venues dedicated to independent music. In October 2004, Chisholm finished recording her third album. In an interview, Chisholm said she wanted to create deeper songs using piano, violin and personal themes. On 4 April 2005, Chisholm released "Next Best Superstar" as the lead single of her third album. It was released in three formats: two singles with B-sides – the acoustic version or the B-side "Everything Must Change" – and a remixes EP. The song peaked at number 10 in the UK. On 11 April, she released Beautiful Intentions, her third album and first by Red Girl. It was produced by Greg Haver, Guy Chambers, Paul Boddy. Eleven of the twelve songs were written by Chisholm. The album peaked at number 24 in the UK, top 15 in other European countries, and was certified Gold in Germany and Switzerland.

In support of the album, she embarked on the Beautiful Intentions Tour, starting on 16 April in the O2 Academy Birmingham, In London, and travelling for twenty-five dates across Europe and Asia. On 1 August, "Better Alone" was released in the UK only as the second single, but it did not enter the charts due to the single being available online. "First Day of My Life" was released as a single on 30 September in Australia and Europe – but not in the UK. The song was not included in the original version of the album, only in the 2006 re-released version, becoming the second international single from Beautiful Intentions. It was originally to have been recorded by Italian tenor Andrea Bocelli, with lyrics (in Italian) as "Un Nuovo Giorno" for his 2004 eponymous album Andrea. The song peaked at number 1 in Spain, Germany, Switzerland and Portugal, number 2 in Austria, and it was in the top 30 in Norway, France and Denmark. On 24 February 2006, "Better Alone" was released in Australia and Europe as the third official single, after a limited release in the UK over the previous year. The song entered the charts in some countries, peaked at thirty-six in Italy and thirty-three in Switzerland. On 3 April, the album was re-released, including "First Day of My Life" and the music video. In 2006, Chisholm released her first live DVD, Live Hits, recorded on 31 August 2006 at the Bridge in southeast London. The DVD peaked at number 10.

=== 2007–2008: This Time and Spice Girls reunion ===
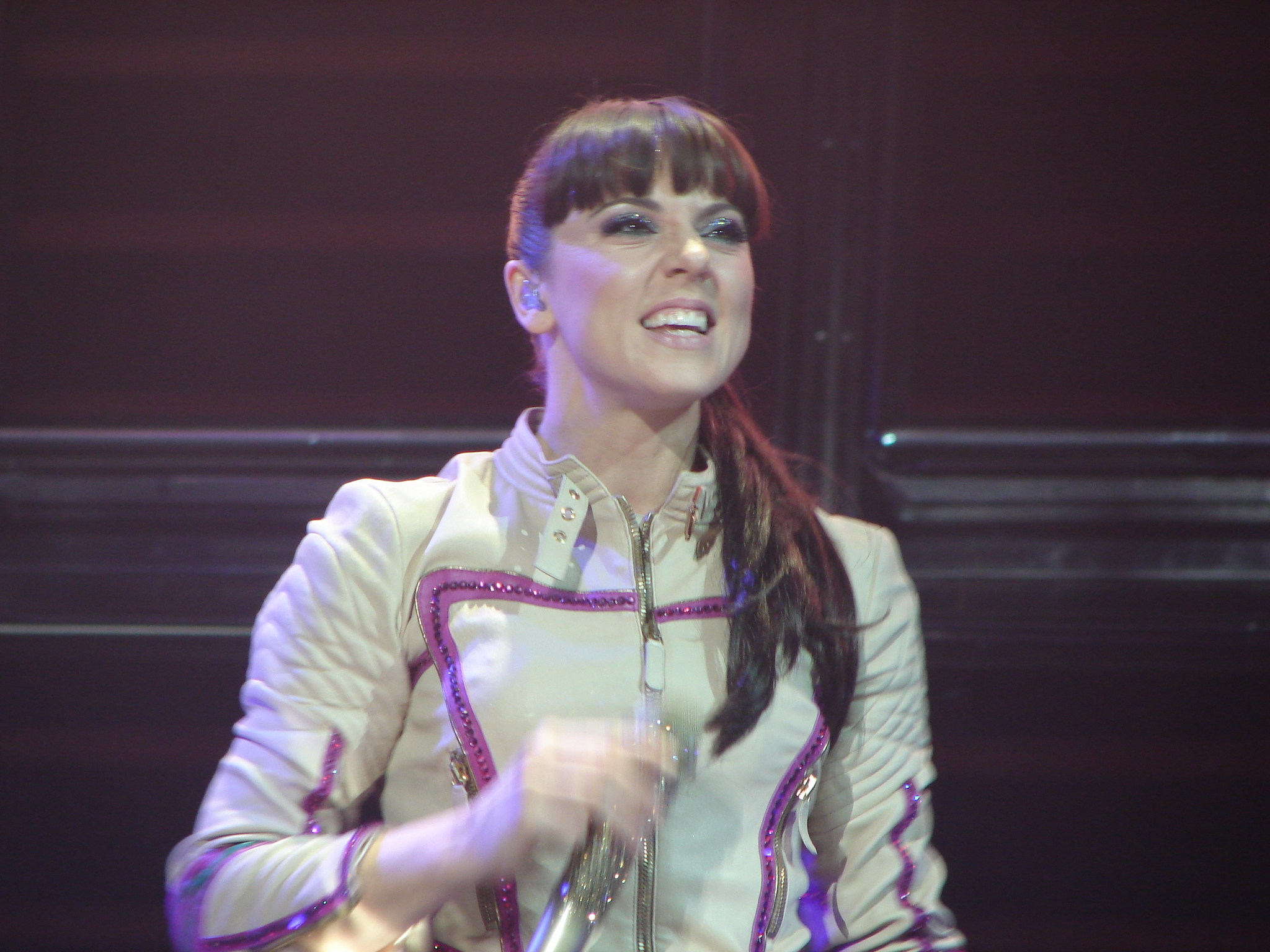
Chisholm performing in 2007

In early 2007, Chisholm finished recording her next album and, in March, she released two singles simultaneously. "The Moment You Believe" was released in Europe, except in the UK, and peaked at number 1 in Spain and Portugal, and in the top 20 in Switzerland, Sweden and Germany. Produced and co-written by Peter Vettese, it has been soundbed for the spring advertising campaign for German television show, Nur die Liebe zählt. "I Want Candy" was released only in the UK and Italy, peaking at number 24 and number 9, respectively, and featured on the soundtrack to the film of the same name. The song was a cover version of the Strangeloves song. On 30 March, she released her fourth album, This Time, with thirteen tracks – six written by Chisholm – and other two cover versions: "What If I Stay" and "Don't Let Me Go", by Jill Jackson, from her debut album. The album peaked at number 57 in the UK and number 8 in Switzerland, which was certified Gold. "Carolyna" was released as the third single on 8 June. During an interview at Loose Women, Chisholm revealed that she wrote this song after watching a documentary about young adults and teenagers homeless, living in the streets in Seattle. The song peaked at 49 in the UK, and in the top 50 in other countries.

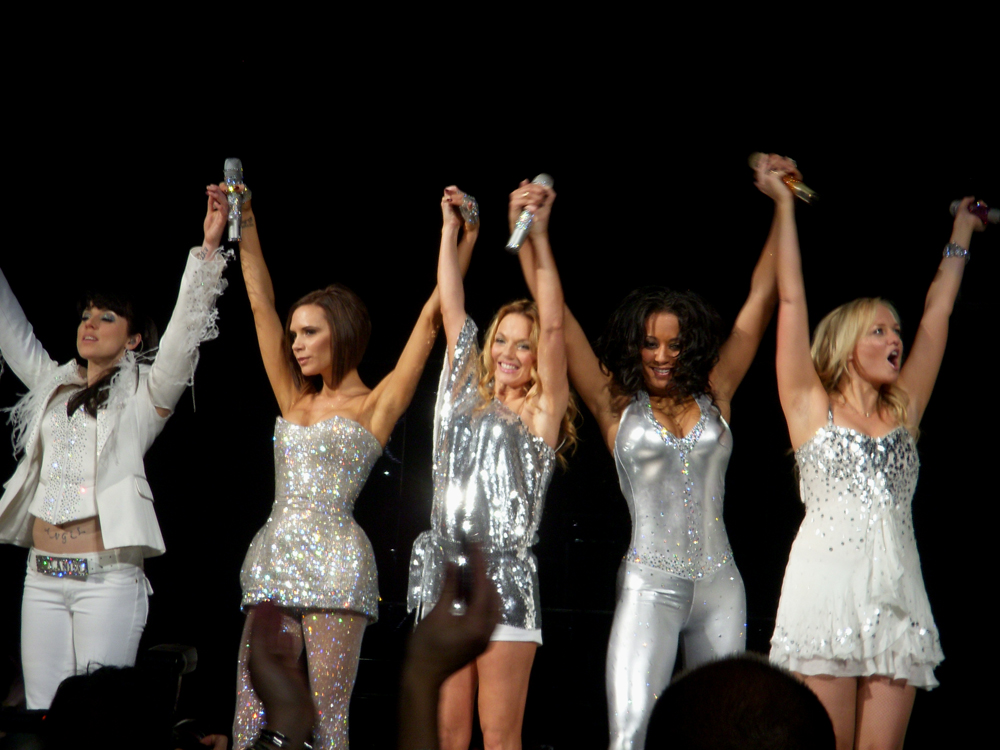
Spice Girls performing in 2007

On 28 June 2007, the Spice Girls held a surprise press conference at The O2 Arena announcing that they were reuniting to embark on a worldwide concert tour, The Return of the Spice Girls, starting in Vancouver on 2 December. They received £10 million (approximately $20 million) each for the tour. Filmmaker Bob Smeaton directed an official documentary on the reunion. It was entitled Giving You Everything. At the same time, Chisholm released the fourth single of her album, "This Time", features the B-side "We Love to Entertain You", which was used for 2007's Pro7 Starforce campaign in Germany. The song peaked at number 94 in the UK and 69 in Germany. On 5 November, the Spice Girls released their return single, "Headlines (Friendship Never Ends)", also announced as the official Children in Need charity single and performed at Victoria's Secret Fashion Show. The song peaked at number 11, becoming the first song to not reach the top 10. The music video was directed by Anthony Mandler and the girls used exclusive clothes designed by Roberto Cavalli. They released a compilation album, the Greatest Hits in November, including the singles, the 1997 Pepsi's theme "Move Over" and two new songs, "Voodoo" and "Headlines (Friendship Never Ends)". The compilation sold 6 million copies.

They embarked on the tour on 2 December, travelling for 47 dates until 26 February 2008. The tour is estimated to have grossed over US$70 million and produced $107.2 million in ticket sales and merchandising. The tour won the 2008 Billboard Touring Award. As well as their sell-out tour, the Spice Girls were contracted to appear in Tesco advertisements, for which they were paid £1 million each. After the end of the reunion with the Spice Girls, Chisholm embarked on her fifth tour, the This Time Canadian Tour, in May 2008, performing in nine Canadian cities. On 25 July, "Understand" was released as fifth and final single from This Time only in Canada.

=== 2009–2014: Acting, The Sea and Stages ===
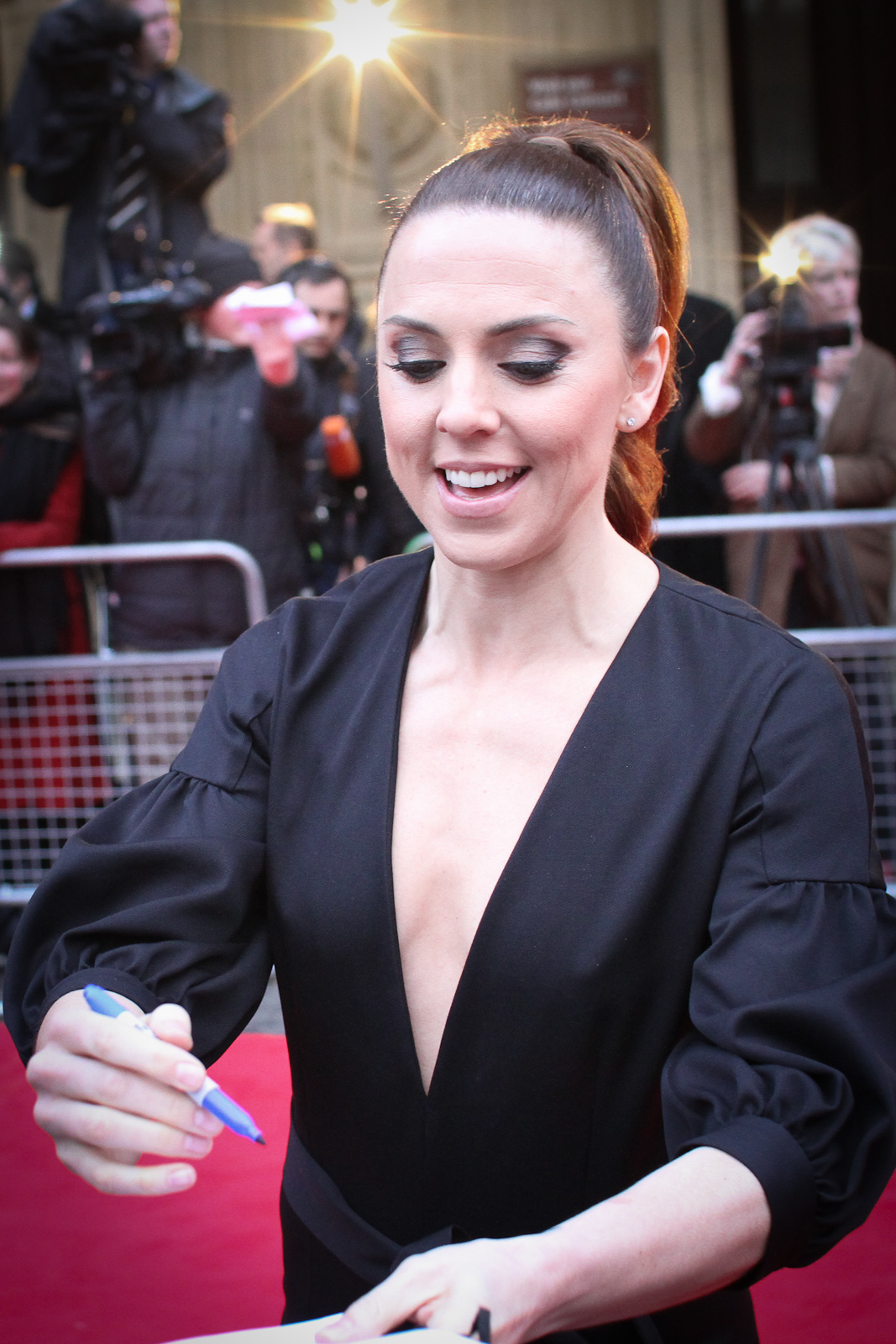
Chisholm at the Royal Albert Hall in 2011

In 2009, it was planned she would star in a sequel to the 1996 horror film The Craft, but the production was cancelled. On 29 June, Chisholm released her second DVD concert, Live at the Hard Rock Cafe, including two previously unreleased songs, "Blue Skies All the Way" and "Paris Burning". The DVD peaked at number 22 in the UK.

In October 2009, she had her acting debut on stage as Mrs Johnstone in the musical Blood Brothers, a new version of the 1983 original production. She starred in Blood Brothers until the end of 2010. Chisholm's performance was critically acclaimed and she was nominated for the 2010 Laurence Olivier Award for Best Actress in a Musical. In the same year she started working on her next album. On 24 June 2011, "Rock Me" was released as single only in Germany and peaked at number 33 in the country. The song was served as the official theme of the 2011 FIFA Women's World Cup. "Think About It" was chosen as worldwide single and marked the Chisholm return to dance-pop. The song peaked at number 95 in the UK, 15 in the UK Indie Chart and top 40 in other European countries. The Sea, her fifth studio album, was released on 2 September, and was produced by Andy Chatterley, Cutfather and Peter-John Vettese. The album peaked at number 45 in the UK and also 13 in Switzerland and sixteen in Germany.

Chisholm was mentor assistant in the third series of The X Factor Australia and helped the Mel B team, formed by under 25 years-old girls, during the selection process. The girls did not reach the final. "Weak" was released only in the UK as the third single, charting in the UK Indie Chart. "Let There Be Love" was released as fourth and final single of The Sea in Germany and Switzerland. She also recorded "Viva Life" for the documentary Bash Street. In November, she embarked on her sixth concert tour, The Sea – Live, travelling in Europe during 17 dates. The record of the tour was released as DVD on 27 February 2012. In her interview for "Ask Melanie C Episode 8" on her YouTube channel, Chisholm said that she "feels very sad as The Sea was a really great album and it wasn't as successful as it deserved to be". In April, Chisholm was invited by British DJ Jodie Harsh to collaborate on an electronic project. On 13 May they released the EP The Night, including three songs. "Set You Free" was released as a promo single from the EP. In July, she was judge of the ITV talent show Superstar, which searched to find an actor to starring the musical Jesus Christ Superstar. Ben Forster was chosen.

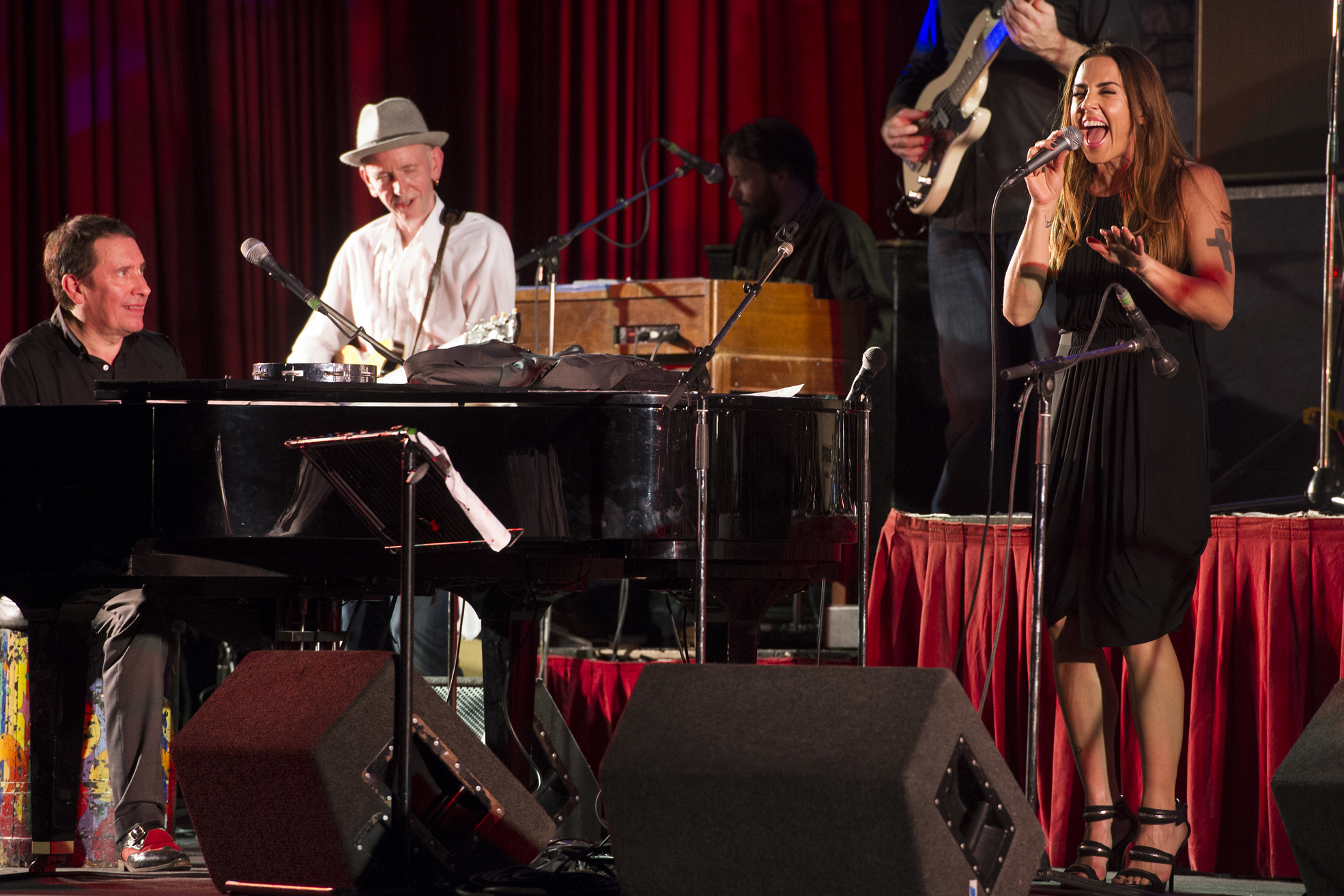
Chisholm at the Gibraltar International Jazz Festival in 2013

Chisholm co-starred in the musical, playing the role of Mary Magdalene. For her performance Chisholm won Best Supporting Actress in a musical at the Whatsonstage.com Awards. She played the character until 2013. Inspired by the stage, Chisholm began recording an album with musical theatre songs. "I Don't Know How to Love Him" was released on 22 July and peaked at number 20 on UK Indie Chart. This was a version of the song originally sung by Yvonne Elliman from the 1970 musical Jesus Christ Superstar. On 7 September, Chisholm released her sixth studio album, Stages, produced by Peter-John Vettese and featuring a collection of show tunes that have been important to Chisholm at various stages of her life. The album peaked at number 50 in the UK and 83 in Ireland. "I Know Him So Well", a version of the Elaine Paige and Barbara Dickson song from the 1984 musical Chess, was released as a single on 11 November, featuring vocals by the British singer Emma Bunton. The song peaked at number 153 in the UK and 14 in the UK Indie Chart.

She also was part of The Justice Collective, a super-group of musicians, including Robbie Williams and Paul McCartney, who recorded the charity song "He Ain't Heavy, He's My Brother". The song was released as single on 17 December and peaked at number 1. In 2013, she played Christy in the British comedy film Play Hard. On 18 August, released "Loving You", a collaboration with British singer Matt Cardle. The song peaked at number 14, becoming the first Chisholm's song in the top 15 since 2005. She released her first live album, Live at Shepherd's Bush Empire, on 12 December. On 12 January 2014, Chisholm celebrated her 40th birthday with a special show for the fans, entitled Sporty's Forty, singing her hits and featured Emma Bunton. On 31 March, the Slovak singer Peter Aristone released "Cool as You", featured vocals of Chisholm, as lead single from 19 Days in Tetbury. Her cover version of "Ain't Got No, I Got Life", by Nina Simone, was included in the compilation Beautiful Cover Versions. She also had a cameo appearance in the music video "Word Up", by Little Mix.

=== 2015–2018: Television and Version of Me ===
In 2015, Chisholm joined the judging panel for Asia's Got Talent, along with David Foster, Anggun Cipta, and Vanness Wu. They started the selection in Singapore. During production and selections, Chisholm lived in Malaysia, where the program was recorded. The Asia's Got Talent live shows, with the semifinalists, was aired in March 2015, and ran two months until the finals. On 14 May Chisholm and the judges released a cover version of "Let's Groove", originally by Earth, Wind & Fire, and performed the song in the final. In October, she was mentor assistant in the game competition Bring the Noise. At the same time, she started working on her seventh studio album. The second series of Asia's Got Talent was confirmed for summer 2016, but the project has been discontinued. In 2016, she was featured as a vocalist on "Numb" with Sons Of Sonix, which was stated to be a song from her upcoming album. In September 2016, she made a cameo appearance in KT Tunstall's music video for "Hard Girls". On 6 September 2016, Chisholm released the upcoming album's lead single, "Anymore"; the change in musical direction - to a more electronic sound - was praised by critics. The single peaked at number one on the UK Physical Singles Chart. Her seventh album, Version of Me, was released on 21 October 2016. Version of Me debuted and peaked at number 25 on the UK Albums Chart, becoming Melanie C's highest-charting album since Beautiful Intentions (2005). On 16 December 2016, she released "Dear Life" as the album's second single. In March 2017, she released "Hold On", a collaboration with singer Alex Francis, featured on the deluxe edition of the album.

Chisholm appeared on the Graham Norton Show in May 2017 to perform a duet with Keith Urban for his song, The Fighter. She sang in place of Carrie Underwood, who was the original singer on the duet. On 27 May 2017, Chisholm performed in Mexico City as part of the Classics Fest concert series, which also featured performances by Vanilla Ice and Jenny Berggren of Ace of Base, held at the Auditorio BB. This marked Chisholm's first time performing as a solo artist in Latin America and her first visit in many years since her days with the Spice Girls. Chisholm stated upon her musical return to Mexico, "I haven't been back to Mexico in many years and when I was there it was very brief, so I am excited to return and sing." In June, Chisholm also performed for the first time in Brazil, playing live shows in both Rio de Janeiro and São Paulo. In August 2017, Chisholm announced the album's fourth and final single, "Room for Love". She asked for fans to send in videos of themselves singing along to the track. On 20 October 2017, the single was released, with the video not only showing clips of fans, but also featured clips of Emma Bunton, Geri Halliwell, Victoria Beckham, KT Tunstall and Natalie Imbruglia. "Room for Love" peaked at number two on the UK Physical Singles Chart. In late 2017, Chisholm was co-headliner at Night of the Proms, a 25-concert tour in the Netherlands, Belgium, Germany and Luxembourg. In 2018, she turned her hand to disc jockeying by performing a "90s mix" at various events, and embarked on the Melanie C - Asia Tour 2018.

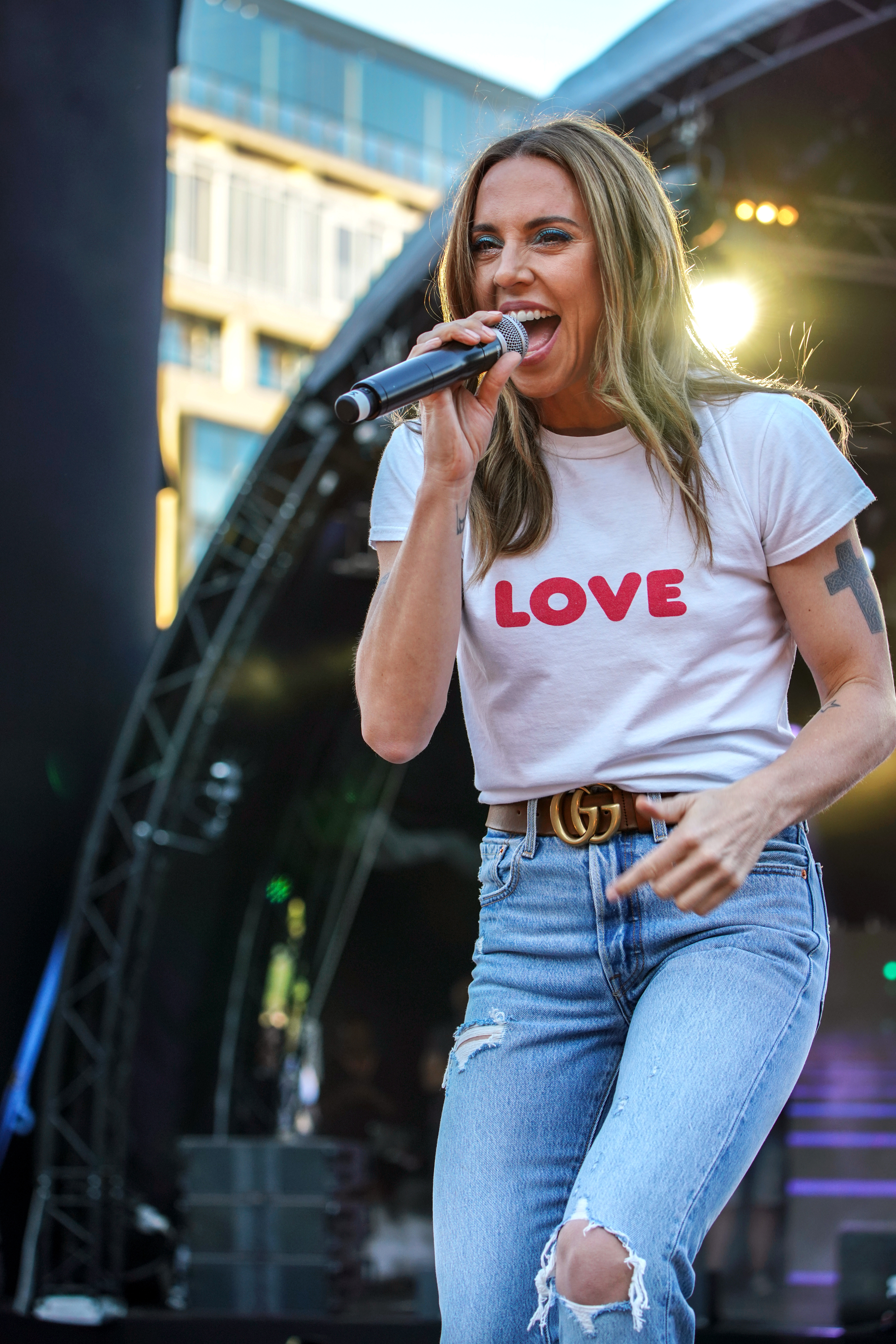
Chisholm in 2018

=== 2019–2021: Spice Girls reunion and Melanie C ===
On 5 November 2018, Chisholm along with the Spice Girls had announced a reunion tour. She and ex-bandmates Melanie B, Bunton and Geri Halliwell reunited for the Spice World – 2019 Tour, a 13 date tour of eight cities in the UK and Ireland that was their first for a decade. The tour opened at Croke Park, Dublin on 24 May 2019 and concluded at Wembley Stadium in London on 15 June 2019.

On 6 November 2019, Chisholm released the single "High Heels" which features drag act Sink the Pink. During promotion for the single, Chisholm stated during an interview with The Guardian that she had been working on a new album with artists including Shura and Little Boots.

Chisholm released her self-titled eighth studio album Melanie C on 2 October 2020. The album entered the UK Albums Chart at number 8, her first top 10 album since Reason in 2003. The album was preceded by the singles "Who I Am", "Blame It on Me", and "In and Out of Love". Chisholm first performed "Who I Am" live on 21 April 2020 on The Late Late Show with James Corden, where she live streamed her performance from her home due to the COVID-19 pandemic. On 13 May 2020, Chisholm sang "Who I Am", among other singles from her career, as part of a "bathroom" gig in aid of WaterAid. On 16 September 2020, Chisholm premiered the video for "Fearless" the fourth single off the album, which is a collaboration with UK rapper Nadia Rose. Melanie C was reissued in a deluxe version on 3 September 2021 and was accompanied by the single "Touch Me".

On 13 November 2020, Chisholm was featured on "Stop Crying Your Heart Out" as part of the BBC Radio 2's Allstars' Children in Need charity single. Chisholm also made a guest appearance in British singer-songwriter Celeste's music video, "Love is Back", which premiered in January 2021. Chisholm was presented with the "Celebrity Ally" award at the 2021 British LGBT Awards, held in London in August.

On 1 September 2021, the Spice Girls announced the re-release of Spice to mark their anniversary, titling it Spice25. The deluxe release saw the album reenter the UK Albums Chart at number five. That same month, she appeared as a contestant for series 30 of the American series Dancing with the Stars. Chisholm and her professional partner Gleb Savchenko were eliminated on 18 October 2021, finishing in eleventh place. On 26 October 2021, Chisholm performed "2 Become 1" as a duet with Chris Martin of Coldplay for the 8th Annual "We Can Survive" concert by Audacy at the Hollywood Bowl in Los Angeles. The following month, she appeared once again as a judge The Voice Kids. Teen Torrin Cuthill, who was mentored by Chisholm, won the three-episode series.

=== 2022–2024: Who I Am: My Story and festival appearances ===
In February 2022, Chisholm appeared as a guest judge on the first episode of the first series of RuPaul's Drag Race: UK vs. the World. The series was filmed in March 2021. On 22 April 2022, Chisholm was featured on the Tobtok remix to Train's single "AM Gold". In July 2022, Chisholm was featured on a re-recording of "When You're Gone" with Bryan Adams on his album of reworked songs, Classic Pt II. Chisholm had made a surprise appearance with Adams at a concert in the same stadium earlier in the month. That same month, Chisholm headlined Northern Pride in Newcastle with a DJ set. In September 2022, Chisholm said that she had begun work on her next studio album. On 15 September 2022, Chisholm's memoir, Who I Am: My Story was released. The American version of the book was retitled The Sporty One: My Life as a Spice Girl and as released on 27 September 2022. Chisholm promoted the book through the Who I Am: My Story book tour, which toured the United States and visited literature festivals in the United Kingdom. On 3 November 2022, Jessie Ware released the "Melanie C remix" to her single "Free Yourself". On 4 November, the Spice Girls released Spiceworld25, the 25th anniversary edition of their 1997 album Spiceworld. On 5 November, Chisholm appeared as a judge on ITV's Queens for the Night. On 11 November, Chisholm was presented with the Inspirational Artist Award at the 2022 Music Week: Women in Music Awards. On 14 November, Chisholm was announced as performer in the 2023 music festival Camp Bestival. On 15 December 2022, Chisholm performed a duet with Alfie Boe as part of Royal Carols: Together at Christmas, hosted by Catherine, Princess of Wales; the show aired on 24 December on ITV1. On 19 December, she appeared as a guest performing "Stop" on Bunton's Christmas Tour at the Theatre Royal, Drury Lane concert.

In January 2023, Chisholm starred in the dance production how did we get here at Sadler's Wells Theatre. In March 2023, it was announced that Chisholm had signed with Various Artists Management. Chisholm headlined the Godiva Festival in Coventry, performing on 2 July date. She made numerous festival appearances across England and mainland Europe in the summer of 2023. On 19 July 2023, Chisholm was featured on the single "Call Me A Lioness", released in celebration of the 2023 FIFA Women's World Cup. The single was released by Hope FC, a British supergroup consisting of Chisholm and ten other female artists. Chisholm and Emergency Loop collaborated on production of a remix for Swedish singer Tove Lo's single "I Like U", which was released on 21 July 2023. In November 2023, Chisholm embarked on a two-week DJ tour of Australia. On 30 November 2023, she performed "Tell Me It's Not True" with Ben Forster in that year's Royal Variety Performance, held at the Royal Albert Hall. The show was televised on 17 December 2023.

In January 2024, Chisholm performed a one-night-only show at Koko, London in celebration of her 50th birthday. In April and May 2024, Chisholm embarked on a DJ tour of Australia. Also in May, Chisholm performed DJ sets for three nights at the Pacha club, Ibiza. In July 2024, she confirmed she would be releasing new music in 2025, during an interview on The Chris Moyles Show. On 29 August 2024, Chisholm's ancestry was explored in an episode of the BBC's genealogy series Who Do You Think You Are? In September 2024, she did a five-day DJ tour of Canada. On 25 December 2024, It's Christmas Live from the Royal Albert Hall aired on Sky Showcase, featuring Chisholm performing with Ricky Wilson.

=== 2025–present: Continued work as a DJ and Sweat ===
On 17 January 2025, Chisholm continued her work as a DJ by releasing a gym and fitness mix on Apple Music. The following month, in an interview with Apple Music 1, she shared she had been working with Rose Gray and Uffie, and collaborated with past producers Richard Stannard and Billen Ted, on a new album. She elaborated, "I'm a pop artist, but I love my dance music. I love so many genres of music, but right now DJing, I'm super inspired by that and I really want to bring my work as a DJ and my solo work as an artist a bit closer together [...] so we're going to have some fun remixes. There's going to be some bops and I'm really excited to get it out there." "Girl", a collaboration with Anna Lunoe, was released on 27 February. In March 2025, it was announced that Chisholm would headline that year's Mighty Hoopla music festival in Malta, in September 2025. In early 2025, Chisholm travelled to Australia to film The Voice Australia to replace LeAnn Rimes, as one of the coaches, alongside Ronan Keating, Richard Marx, and Kate Miller-Heidke. Whilst in Australia, she performed DJ sets, and performed "Girl" with collaborator Anna Lunoe at the 2025 Australian Grand Prix. On 16 April 2025, it was announced Chisholm would return to the Pacha Club, Ibiza, in summer 2025.

It was announced that Chisholm's ninth studio album, Sweat, would be released on 1 May 2026, in partnership with Virgin Music Group. The album's titular lead single was released on 17 October 2025, debuting and peaking at number 10 on the UK Singles Downloads Chart, going on to spend a total of six weeks on that chart; it also peaked at number 22 in Australia on the ARIA digital chart. To celebrate the release of the album, she will perform a concert at London's O_{2} Academy Brixton on 23 October 2026. On 24 October 2025, Chisholm's collaboration with Rose Gray, "First", was released on the latter's deluxe album A Little Louder, Please. On 29 October 2025, she headlined a Candlelight concert at St. Paul's Cathedral, with ticket revenue going to support the charity Shelter. On the same day, Chisholm was announced as a Model for Jonathan Anderson’s Loafer Bag Spring/Summer 2026 collection campaign. In November 2025, Chisholm headed to the New York City, appearing on Good Morning America and The Kelly Clarkson Show to discuss her solo career, Spice Girls, and the "Sweat" single and forthcoming album. Whilst in the city, Chisholm performed a DJ set as part of Daybreaker at the Othership sauna. In a December 2025 interview with Davina McCall, Chisholm revealed she would be returning for a second season of The Voice as a coach. On 31 December 2025, she performed on ABC's annual New Year's Eve concert.

On 9 January 2026, Chisholm released a remix for "Sweat", by DJ/producer Guz. On 17 January 2026, she performed "Sweat" for the first time in the United Kingdom, on the series 9 opener of Michael McIntyre's Big Show. Later in January 2026, "Sweat" served as the main theme tune for the 2026 German equivalent of I'm a Celebrity...Get Me Out of Here!: Ich bin ein Star – Holt mich hier raus! Chisholm released the album's second official single, "What Could Possibly Go Wrong?", on 29 January 2026; which was co-written with Klas Ahlund and Nea. Upon release, Chisholm stated, "We had a lot of fun working on this song and discussing the light and shade of music and life. It's a tongue in cheek look on taking risks and trusting yourself to take that leap anyway. I think a lot of people will relate!"

On 3 February 2026, she performed with the BBC Concert Orchestra, as part of BBC Radio 2's Piano Room Month; she sang "2 Become 1", "I Turn To You" and "What Could Possibly Go Wrong?" On 28 February 2026, she headlined as a DJ at Australian venue Poof Doof, as part of that year's Sydney Gay and Lesbian Mardi Gras festival. Chisholm released Sweat's third single "Undefeated Champion" on 13 March 2026. On the same day, she announced the Melanie C World Tour 2026, which will commence in Montreal, Canada, on 8 September 2026, and end in Sydney, Australia, on 15 November 2026, with appearances including Japan and the United States. On 10 April 2026, she released the single "Attitude". Sweat was released on 1 May 2026; an official music video for "Drum Machine", the album's fifth official single, was released on the same day. In the United Kingdom, Sweat debuted at number 3 on the UK Albums Chart; the release became Chisholm's highest charting album in that country, surpassing Northern Star, which peaked at number 4 in 2000. Later that month, it was announced that Chisholm would receive the Global Impact Award at the 2026 O2 Silver Clef Awards; the ceremony took place on 9 July 2026. In June 2026, she was featured on the song "I Don't Wanna Know", taken from American DJ Roger Sanchez's album Spectrum. In September 2026, Chisholm was announced as that year's National Album Day Champion, to be held on 18 October 2026; she stated, "I’ve always loved albums because they tell a story. They’re a chance for an artist to take you on a journey, to share different sides of themselves and create something that’s bigger than just a collection of songs. Some of my favourite musical memories come from listening to an album from start to finish, and I still love discovering new records in that way today. There’s something magical about the artwork and owning an album you can actually hold in your hands [...] I’m really proud to become a National Album Day Album Champion and celebrate the magic of the album format." From 8 September 2026 to 15 November 2026, Chisholm embarked on her first world tour in over twenty years; the Sweat Tour began in Montreal, Canada. In late 2026, Chisholm was the winning coach on the fifteenth season of The Voice Australia when Yung Milla, an artist she mentored, won the season.

== Personal life ==
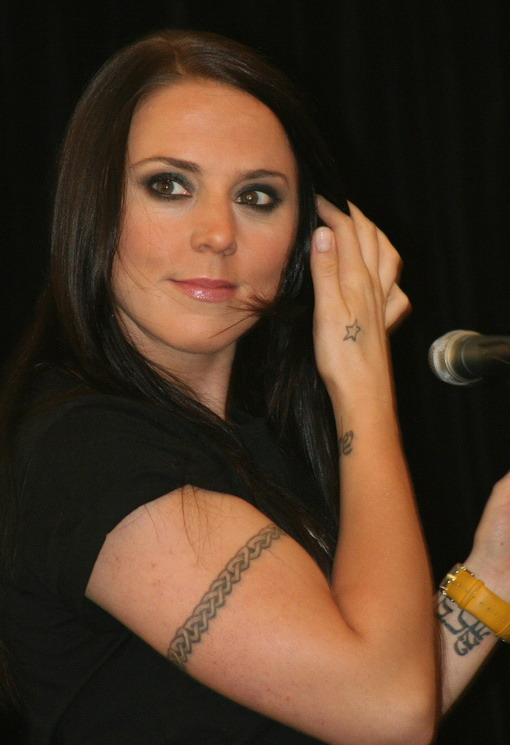
Chisholm in 2005

Chisholm was in a relationship with property developer Thomas Starr for ten years, until they split in 2012. In February 2009, Chisholm gave birth to a daughter. In an interview with the BBC, Chisholm admitted that the arrival of her child proved to be a turning point in her life: "Being a mum was so liberating because for the first time in my adult life, it wasn't all about me. It made me not only realise I had a huge responsibility to her but I have a huge responsibility to myself. In being her teacher, I had to treat myself better." From 2015 to 2022, Chisholm dated her manager, Joe Marshall. Since 2023, Chisholm has been in a relationship with Australian model/actor Chris Dingwall. The couple married in a legal ceremony in Australia, in June 2026, and had a second ceremony on 18 July 2026 in the Lake District in England. Chisholm wore a dress designed by Victoria Beckham.

In 1997, Chisholm had a month-long relationship with singer Robbie Williams. In 1998, she was reported to have had a relationship with Red Hot Chili Peppers lead singer Anthony Kiedis; Chisholm stated in 2022 they had only been friends. Kiedis wrote "Emit Remmus", which is "summer time" spelled backwards, inspired by his relationship with Chisholm. The song was included on the album Californication.

Chisholm has been open about her experiences with clinical depression and an eating disorder. She spoke of her eating disorder to Contact Music, stating, "I'd hammered the gym for three hours a day. It was a way of running away, not thinking. I felt like a robot. When the papers started calling me 'Sumo Spice', I was only a size 10. But I was so upset by all the criticism, it got worse and I went up to a size 14." In a 2022 interview with The Cut, Chisholm elaborated, "It took me such a long time to recover. I would never want to be arrogant enough to say I'm all better because I'm always aware that they could come back. I've really learned how to look after myself. Sometimes, a healthy work-life balance is impossible to maintain. There are times, if I'm very tired or work's very stressful, I can feel things slipping. We all talk about self-care, but it is so vital for me to keep me on track with everything".

Chisholm is a fan of Liverpool F.C. and an amateur triathlete, having completed the London Triathlon twice.

While promoting her Who I Am autobiography in September 2022, Chisholm revealed that she had been sexually assaulted in 1997, during a massage in a hotel in Turkey, on the eve of the first Girl Power! Live in Istanbul show. On Elizabeth Day's podcast, How to Fail, Chisholm said: "I treat[ed] myself to a massage in the hotel and what happened to me, I kind of buried immediately because there were other things to focus on [...] I didn't want to make a fuss but also I didn't have time to deal with it. I felt violated, I felt very vulnerable, I felt embarrassed [...] I do want to talk about it because it has affected me. But I buried it."

On 29 August 2024, Chisholm was the subject of the BBC One genealogy series Who Do You Think You Are?.

== Philanthropy ==
In 2000, all proceeds from sales of her "If That Were Me" single went towards the Kandu Arts charity. In 2012, Chisholm joined the Sport Relief telethon by appearing in a Never Mind the Buzzcocks special. Chisholm also participated in a three-mile "Sport Relief Mile" run. In 2013, Chisholm joined Jack Dee, Dara Ó Briain, Greg James, Chelsee Healey and Philips Idowu in Through Hell and High Water, a Comic Relief challenge which involved British celebrities canoeing the most difficult rapids of the Zambezi River. They raised over £1 million for the charity. In 2014, Chisholm travelled to Ghana to support a charity campaign by Procter & Gamble that provides African children with clean drinking water. The project involved the use of purification sachets that changes the water from stagnant to drinkable. Chisholm also supported a homeless charity by donating funds raised from her annual calendar.

== Artistry ==
=== Influences ===
Chisholm has cited Madonna as her biggest musical influence. She stated: "I think she's inspired me a lot musically, and maybe [in] just the way I present myself. I've always admired how hard she works and what a strong lady she is, so she's always inspired me in that way." Chisholm named Madonna, Blur, Oasis, Suede and the Cardigans as inspirations for her first album. She has also stated Diana Ross has been a big influence on her artistry.

=== Voice ===
Her voice has been described as versatile for different styles and genres, having a distinctive timbre, and "full of flex and snap".

=== Musical style ===
Chisholm's music is generally pop and rock. Although she had dabbled in dance music, from 2016 onwards Chisholm's music adopted heavier electronic, dance, trance and house sounds.

== Cultural impact and legacy ==
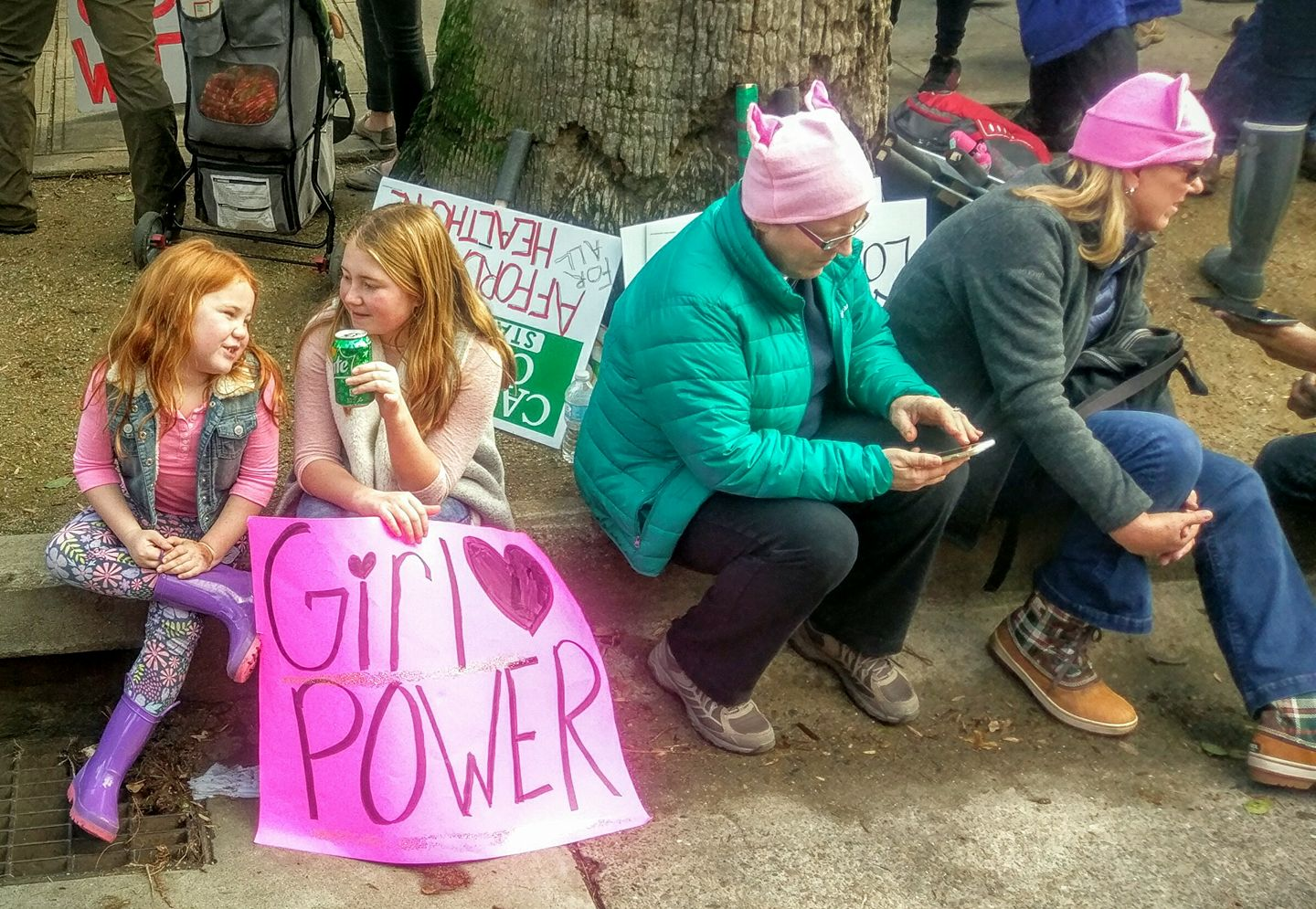
Girl Power slogan on display at the 2017 Women's March in Sacramento, California

As a Spice Girls member, Chisholm was called "Sporty Spice" because she usually wore a tracksuit paired with athletic shoes, wore her long dark hair in a high ponytail, and sported a tough girl attitude as well as tattoos on both of her arms. She has a tattoo on her left arm of a black Christian cross. On her upper-right arm she has tattoos of two Chinese characters: "女" meaning "female" and "力" meaning "force" which together represent the phrase "girl power". She also possessed true athletic abilities, including being able to perform back handsprings. The term "Cool Britannia" became prominent in the media and represented the new political and social climate that was emerging with the advances made by New Labour and the new UK Prime Minister Tony Blair. Although by no means responsible for the onset of "Cool Britannia", the arrival of the Spice Girls added to the new image and re-branding of Britain, and underlined the growing world popularity of British, rather than American, pop music.

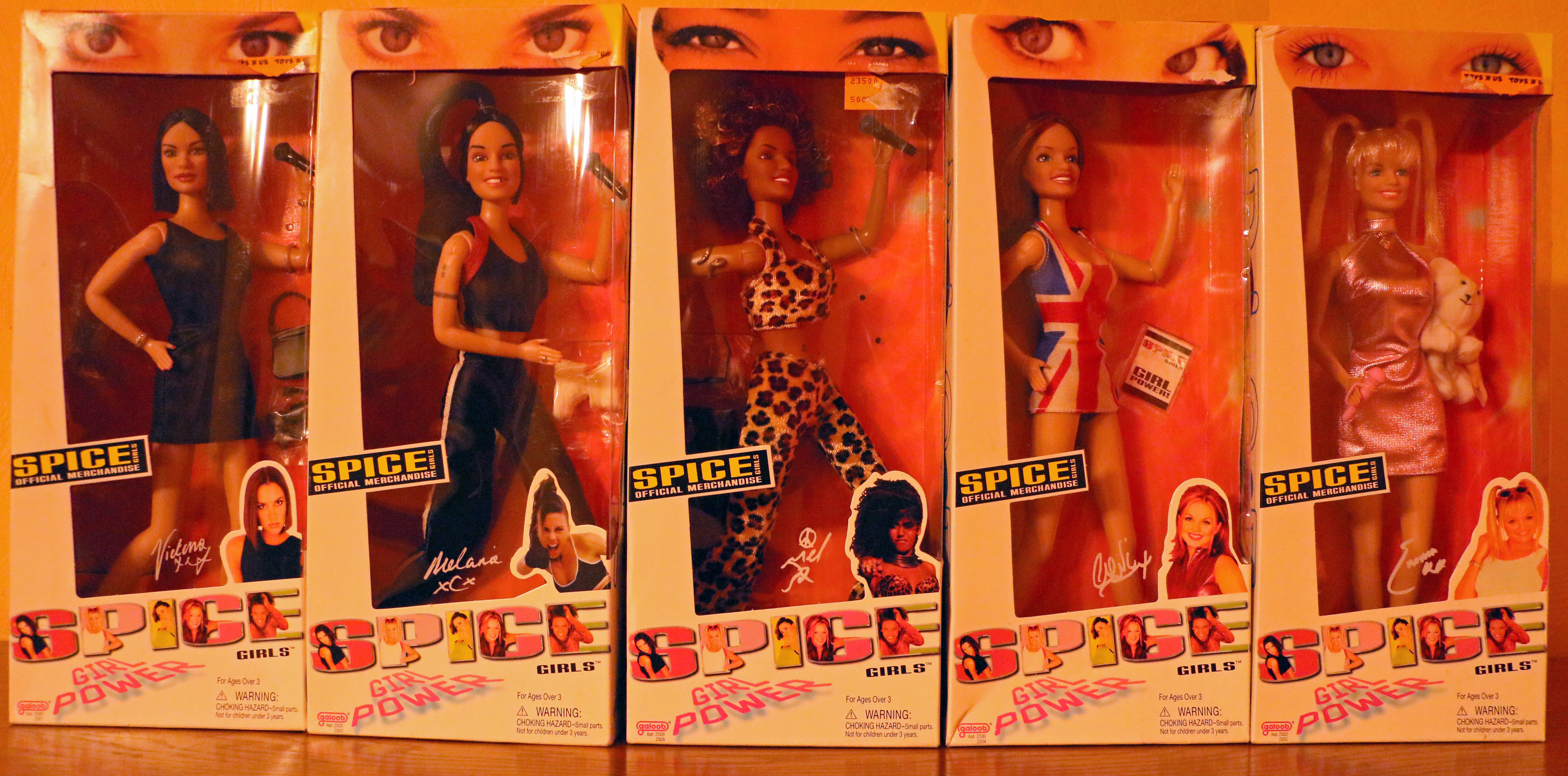
Spice Girls dolls with Sporty Spice

The Spice Girls broke onto the music scene at a time when alternative rock, hip-hop and R&B dominated global music charts. The modern pop phenomenon that the Spice Girls created by targeting early Millennials was credited with changing the global music landscape, bringing about the global wave of late-1990s and early-2000s teen pop acts such as Hanson, Britney Spears, Christina Aguilera and NSYNC. The Spice Girls have also been credited with paving the way for the girl groups and female pop singers that have come after them. In the UK, they are credited for their massive commercial breakthrough in the previously male-dominated pop music scene, leading to the widespread formation of new girl groups in the late 1990s and early 2000s including All Saints, B*Witched, Atomic Kitten, Girls Aloud and Sugababes, hoping to emulate the Spice Girls' success. The Pussycat Dolls, 2NE1, Girls' Generation, Little Mix, Fifth Harmony, Lady Gaga, Jess Glynne, Alexandra Burke, Kim Petras, Charli XCX, Rita Ora, Demi Lovato, Carly Rae Jepsen, Regine Velasquez, MØ, Billie Eilish and Adele credit the Spice Girls as a major influence.

Some songs from Northern Star have appeared in films, such as "Ga Ga" which is heard in Charmed and Big Daddy. The song "Go" makes an appearance in Whatever It Takes. "Suddenly Monday" appears in Maybe Baby and on its soundtrack. After the song gained popularity, "I Turn to You" was featured in the film Bend It Like Beckham. It was covered by Darkseed on "Ultimate Darkness", by Machinae Supremacy on "Webography", and by Wig Wam on 667.. The Neighbour of the Beast. The song was also featured in the musical Viva Forever!, a musical show based on the songs of the Spice Girls. Some songs have also been covered by international artists such as Christine Fan, who translated "Suddenly Monday" in Chinese for her debut album FanFan's World, and Dutch pop singer Do who covered the Japanese bonus-track "Follow Me", for her album of the same name. The single "First Day of My Life" was originally recorded by Italian tenor Andrea Bocelli, with lyrics in Italian as "Un Nuovo Giorno" (A new day) for his 2004 album Andrea, and he also released it as a single the same year. Chisholm's version of the single was a success in German-speaking countries because it was used as the title song of the German soap opera telenovela Wege zum Glück. At the time of The Sea's release, the lead single "Rock Me" served as the official theme song for German TV channel ZDF's coverage of the 2011 FIFA Women's World Cup.

== Discography ==
=== Studio albums ===
- Northern Star (1999)
- Reason (2003)
- Beautiful Intentions (2005)
- This Time (2007)
- The Sea (2011)
- Stages (2012)
- Version of Me (2016)
- Melanie C (2020)
- Sweat (2026)

== Filmography ==
Film
Year	Title	Role	Notes
1997	Spice World	Herself	Golden Raspberry Award for Worst Actress; Nominated – Orange Blimp Award for Favorite Movie Actress; Nominated – Blockbuster Entertainment Award for Favorite Actress – Comedy
2012	Keith Lemon: The Film	Herself	
2012	The Spice Girls Story: Viva Forever!	Herself	Documentary
2013	Play Hard	Christy	
2026	Girl Group	TBA	

Television
Year	Title	Role	Notes
1996	Top of the Pops	Guest host	Christmas special, 1996
1998	All That	Herself	"Spice Girls" (Series 4, episode 8)
2000	Melanie C: Northern Star	Herself	Channel 4 documentary
2000	The Norm Show	Herself	"Norm vs. Jenny" (Series 2, Episode 15)
2003	Bo' Selecta!	Various roles	"Melanie C" (Series 2, Episode 6)
2006	Dei-te Quase Tudo	Herself	"10 May 2006" (Series 1, Episode 132)
2007	Giving You Everything	Herself	Television documentary
2007	The Friday Night Project	Guest host	"Melanie C" (Series 5, Episode 4)
2011	The X Factor Australia	Mentor assistant	Series 3
2012	Superstar	Judge / Mentor	
2014	The Life of Rock with Brian Pern	Herself	"Bi-Polar Polar Bear Aid" (Series 2, Episode 3)
2015	Bring the Noise	Mentor assistant	Series 1
2015	Asia's Got Talent	Judge	Series 1
2020	Culture Interrupted	Herself	Television documentary
2020	Pretty in Plüsch	Francesca de Rossi (Puppet)	Series 1 episode 1
2020	Royal Variety Performance	Herself	
2021	The Voice Kids	Coach/Judge	Series 5
2021	Spice Girls: How Girl Power Changed Britain	Herself	Archive footage
2021	Dancing with the Stars	Contestant	Series 30 (Eliminated fifth)
2021	Entertainment Tonight	Guest host	
2021	A Very Boy Band Holiday	Herself	Television special; cameo
2021–present	Celebrity Gogglebox	Herself; alongside Paul O'Neill	Series 3 to 6
2022	RuPaul's Drag Race: UK vs. the World	Herself	Guest judge (Series 1)
2022	Queens for the Night	Herself	Panel Judge
2022	Royal Carols: Together At Christmas	Herself/Performer	ITV Christmas special
2022	Sam Ryder Rocks New Year’s Eve	Herself/Performer	BBC One show
2022–present	Ocado	Voiceover narration	Ocado television adverts voiceover
2023	Eurovision Song Contest 2023	Introducing the hosts (voiceover)	
2023	CBeebies Grown-Ups	Herself	"The Music In Me"
2023	Royal Variety Performance	Herself/Performer	Performed "Tell Me It's Not True" with Ben Forster
2024	Who Do You Think You Are?	Herself	BBC genealogy documentary series; series 21 episode 3
2024	It's Christmas Live from the Royal Albert Hall	Herself/Performer	Performed with Ricky Wilson
2025–present	The Voice Australia	Coach	Season 14–present
2025	ABC's New Year's Eve Concert	Herself/Concert headliner	
2026	Michael McIntyre's Big Show	Herself/performer	

== Stage ==
Year	Title	Role
2009–10	Blood Brothers	Mrs Johnstone
2012–13	Jesus Christ Superstar	Mary Magdalene
2023	How Did We Get Here?	Dancer

== Tours ==
=== Solo tours ===
- From Liverpool to Leicester Square (1999)
- Northern Star Tour (2000–2001)
- Reason Tour (2003)
- The Barfly Mini-Tour (2004)
- Beautiful Intentions Tour (2005)
- This Time Canadian Tour (2008)
- The Sea Live (2011–2012)
- The Christmas Tour (with Spike Edney; 2014)
- Version of Me UK & Ireland Tour (2017)
- Version of Me European Tour (2017)
- Version of Me Festivals Tour (2017)
- Version of Me Brazilian Tour (2017)
- Version of Me Asia Tour (2018)
- Global Pride Tour (2019)
- Melanie C UK Tour (2020)
- Live Festivals 2022 (2022)
- Live Festivals 2023 (2023)
- Australia DJ Tour (2023)
- Live Festivals 2024 (2024)
- Live Festivals 2025 (2025)
- Sweat Release Party Tour (2026)
- Sweat Live w/ band Festivals 2026 (2026)
- The Melanie C World Tour (2026)
- Sweat Intimate Shows (2026)

=== Spice Girls tours ===
- Spiceworld Tour (1998)
- Christmas in Spiceworld Tour (1999)
- The Return of the Spice Girls Tour (2007–08)
- Spice World – 2019 Tour (2019)

== Published works ==
- C, Melanie (2022). Who I Am: My Story. London: Welbeck. ISBN 978-1538740293.
