= The Sea (Melanie C album) =

2011 album by Melanie C

Studio album by Melanie C
- Released: 2 September 2011
- Genre: Pop
- Length: 47:34
- Labels: Red Girl; Warner
- Producers: Andy Chatterley; Cutfather; Daniel Davidsen; Jason Gill; Greg Hatwell; Peter-John Vettese

Melanie C chronology
This Time (2007)	The Sea (2011)	Stages (2012)

Singles from The Sea
- 1. "Rock Me" Released: 24 June 2011; 2. "Think About It" Released: 4 September 2011; 3. "Weak" Released: 6 November 2011; 4. "Let There Be Love" Released: 2 December 2011

The Sea is the fifth studio album by the English singer Melanie C. It was released by her label, Red Girl Records, on 2 September 2011. Her first new material in four years, during which she had temporarily reunited the Spice Girls, the album was recorded in London and marked a more experimental, genre-blending approach for Melanie C, incorporating pop, rock, dance, acoustic, and atmospheric elements through collaborations with both new writers and Adam Argyle, and was conceived as a cohesive, electronic-tinged project reflecting themes of diversity and depth.

The album received generally positive reviews from critics, who praised its stylistic ambition and Melanie C's vocal performance, with several reviewers highlighting its potential for commercial appeal, while some critics felt it remained inconsistent or overly polished in places. Commercially, The Sea achieved moderate success, performing strongest in German-speaking Europe where it reached the top 20 in Germany and Switzerland, and continuing Melanie C's pattern of stronger results outside the United Kingdom, where it performed best on the UK Independent Albums Chart, peaking at number six.

The Sea was supported by several singles released across different territories over an extended period, led by "Rock Me," which was issued exclusively in Germany to promote the 2011 FIFA Women’s World Cup. It was followed by "Think About It," the international lead single, which achieved moderate chart success in Central Europe, followed by "Weak" and "Let There Be Love," a cover of Rosenstolz's "Liebe ist alles." In further promotion of The Sea, Melanie C embarked on The Sea – Live, her sixth concert tour, which began on 28 November 2011 in Cologne and featured live performances across selected European dates.

== Background ==
In March 2007, Melanie C released This Time, her fourth studio album, in German-speaking Europe, with a wider international release following in April. The album continued her pop rock direction and featured collaborations with Guy Chambers, Stephen Hague, Steve Mac, Phil Thornalley, Peter Vettese, and others. Upon release, This Time received mixed reviews, with critics praising Melanie C's vocal performance and production but offering divided opinions on its songwriting. Commercially, it performed more strongly in continental Europe than in the United Kingdom, reaching the top 20 in several countries and peaking at number eight in Switzerland and number 15 in Germany, where it also earned a Gold certification. The album was promoted through a series of singles released over an extended period, including "The Moment You Believe" and "I Want Candy", as well as a nine-date Canadian tour in 2008.

The Sea, Melanie C's next project, was recorded in London and marked a more experimental and stylistically diverse approach for the singer, incorporating pop, rock, dance, acoustic, and atmospheric elements. She worked with a range of new collaborators, including James Walsh, Richard Stannard, Andy Chatterley, and Cutfather, alongside returning writer Adam Argyle, as part of a deliberate effort to broaden her creative input and explore new musical directions. The album was conceived as a cohesive but genre-blending project with electronic undertones, which inspired its title The Sea, reflecting its thematic idea of diversity and depth. Chisholm also described the record as energetic and euphoric in tone, with its visual presentation featuring her emerging from the sea, photographed in Whitby, North Yorkshire. The cover photography was by Pip, who also contributed additional location images for the booklet, while further booklet photography was provided by long-time collaborator Ray Burmiston, and the sleeve design was created by Ian Ross, who had previously worked on Beautiful Intentions and This Time.

== Promotion ==
The singles from The Sea were released across different territories throughout 2011, "Rock Me" was issued exclusively in Germany on 24 June 2011, serving as the official song for ZDF's coverage of the 2011 FIFA Women's World Cup, and reached the top 40 of the German Albums Chart. The lead international single, "Think About It," premiered in July 2011 and was released in September, reaching number 95 in the United Kingdom and achieving stronger results elsewhere, including the top 40 in Austria and Switzerland, and a peak of number 15 on the UK Independent Singles Chart. It was followed in the UK by "Weak," released in November 2011, which reached number 29 on the UK Independent Singles Chart and received notable radio airplay, becmoming Melanie C' highest appearance on the chart since her 2003 single "Melt." In German-speaking Europe, "Let There Be Love," an English-language cover of the German song "Liebe ist alles" by duo Rosenstolz, was issued in December 2011.

== Critical reception ==
Professional ratings
Review scores
Source	Rating
AllMusic	3.5/5 stars
Entertainment Focus	4/5 stars
MusicOMH	2/5 stars
OK! Magazine	3/5 stars

Jon O'Brien wrote positively for AllMusic, describing The Sea as "a huge leap forward from her past three efforts" and suggesting that, had it followed Northern Star more closely, it might have sustained her early solo success. Rating the album three-and-a-half out of five stars, he highlighted "Think About It" and "Stupid Game" as bold pop-rock anthems in the style of Katy Perry and Kelly Clarkson, while likening "Get Out of Here" to a Muse take on "Feeling Good" fused with a John Barry-style James Bond score. Pip Elwood of Entertainment Focus awarded the album four out of five stars, calling it a strong and consistent collection of pop songs that could return Chisholm to chart success and deliver another major hit. Writing for the Daily Express, Simon Gage praised the album for giving Chisholm’s voice a thorough workout, ranging from power ballads and rock tracks to dancefloor-ready songs.

Keith Bruce of The Herald described The Sea as mostly slick but unremarkable, noting its emphasis on Chisholm’s vocal range through solo, multi-tracked performances and identifying "All About You" as a standout, hit-worthy track. He also highlighted the album’s varied production as a source of its polish and appeal. OK! Magazine called The Sea Chisholm’s most ambitious album to date, citing its blend of rock, pop, and subtle electro influences. Jade Wright of the Liverpool Echo praised the album’s authenticity, noting its lack of artifice and describing it as an enjoyable listen for both fans and casual listeners alike. Nick Harries of the Sunday Mercury offered a highly positive assessment, highlighting the album’s stylistic variety—from dance pop and 1980s electro to radio rock—and singling out the title track as the album’s strongest moment, with its dramatic melody and rhythmic intensity. In a negative review, laut.de editor Artur Schulz wrote: "Over the length of a solo album, even the most advanced studio technology can't turn an average little voice into a prima donna. Too often, Melanie indulges in squeaky-sounding vocal passages. As a result, there’s not much left in the spice jar this year. The Sea washes up little more than a bit of driftwood."

== Commercial performance ==
The Sea experienced moderate commercial success, performing most strongly in German-speaking Europe. It reached number 13 in Switzerland and number 16 in Germany, while also charting in Austria at number 38. In the United Kingdom, the album peaked at number 45 on the UK Albums Chart, but achieved greater success on the UK Independent Albums Chart, where it reached number six, and on the UK Album Downloads Chart, where it peaked at number 29. It also charted in Scotland, peaking at number 69 on the Scottish Albums Chart.

== Track listing ==
The Sea track listing
No.	Title	Writer(s)	Producer(s)	Length
1.	"The Sea"	Ash Howes; Melanie Chisholm; Richard "Biff" Stannard; Seton Daunt	Andy Chatterley	4:51
2.	"Weak"	Ina Wroldsen; Jez Ashurt; Chisholm	Chatterley	3:24
3.	"Think About It"	Adam Argyle; Daniel Davidsen; Jason Gill; Chisholm; Mich Hansen	Cutfather; Davidsen; Jason Gill	3:47
4.	"Beautiful Mind"	Dee Adam; James Earp; Chisholm	Chatterley	3:41
5.	"One by One"	James Walsh; Chisholm	Greg Hatwell	4:06
6.	"Stupid Game"	Argyle; Martin Brammer; Chisholm	Chatterley	3:20
7.	"All About You"	Chuck Harmony; Guy Chambers; Lauren Christy	Peter-John Vettese	4:01
8.	"Burn"	Argyle; Davidsen; Gill; Chisholm; Hansen	Cutfather; Davidsen; Jason Gill	4:00
9.	"Drown"	Argyle; Jodi Marr; Chisholm	Chatterley	3:59
10.	"Get Out of Here"	Chisholm; Vettese	Vettese	4:10
11.	"Enemy"	Hatwell; Chisholm	Chatterley; Hatwell	8:12
Total length:				47:34

iTunes bonus track
No.	Title	Writer(s)	Producer(s)	Length
12.	"Let There Be Love"	Peter Plate; Ulf Leo Sommer	Daniel Faust; Plate; Sommer	3:33

German edition
No.	Title	Writer(s)	Producer(s)	Length
1.	"Think About It"			3:47
2.	"Burn"			4:00
3.	"Get Out of Here"			4:10
4.	"Weak"			3:24
5.	"Stupid Game"			3:20
6.	"Let There Be Love"			3:33
7.	"Drown"			3:59
8.	"All About You"			4:01
9.	"The Sea"			4:51
10.	"Beautiful Mind"			3:41
11.	"One By One"			4:06
12.	"Rock Me"	Chisholm; Dave Roth; David Jost	Chatterley; Roth	3:13

iTunes bonus track
No.	Title	Length
13.	"Enemy"	8:12

Amazon MP3 bonus track
No.	Title	Length
13.	"Think About It (Acoustic Version - Live at Hitradio Ö3)"	3:23

== Charts ==
Chart performance for The Sea
Chart (2011)	Peak position
Austrian Albums (Ö3 Austria)	38
German Albums (Offizielle Top 100)	16
Scottish Albums (Official Charts)	69
Swiss Albums (Schweizer Hitparade)	13
UK Albums (Official Charts)	45
UK Album Downloads (Official Charts)	29
UK Independent Albums (Official Charts)	6

== Release history ==
Release dates and formats for The Sea
Region	Date	Labels	Refs.
Austria	2 September 2011	Warner Music / 313 Music	
Croatia	2 September 2011	Warner Music / 313 Music	
Czech Republic	2 September 2011	Warner Music / 313 Music	
Germany	2 September 2011	Warner Music / 313 Music	
Serbia	2 September 2011	Warner Music / 313 Music	
Slovakia	2 September 2011	Warner Music / 313 Music	
Slovenia	2 September 2011	Warner Music / 313 Music	
Switzerland	2 September 2011	Warner Music / 313 Music	
Denmark	5 September 2011	Warner Music	
Finland	5 September 2011	Warner Music	
Norway	5 September 2011	Warner Music	
Sweden	5 September 2011	Warner Music	
United Kingdom	5 September 2011	Red Girl Records	
United States	5 September 2011	Red Girl Records	
Poland	31 October 2011	Warner Music	
Turkey	12 December 2011	Warner Music / EMI Turkey	
