= Live Hits =

Video by Melanie C
- Released: 30 October 2006
- Recorded: 31 August 2006
- Genre: Pop rock
- Length: 110 min
- Language: English
- Label: Red Girl
- Director: Matt Askem
- Producer: Celia Moore

Melanie C chronology
Live Hits (2006)	Live at the Hard Rock Cafe (2009)

Live Hits is the first live DVD released by English singer Melanie C. Recorded in August 2006 at The Bridge in south-east London and features Melanie performing a selection of songs from her first three albums in both acoustic and full band sets. The DVD has sold over 100,000 copies in total.

The DVD also features interviews, back stage footage, photo galleries and several hidden alternative versions of the tracks (Easter Eggs).

== Track listing ==
Acoustic set:

1. "Beautiful Intentions"
2. "Be the One"
3. "If That Were Me"
4. "Here It Comes Again"
5. "Why"
6. "Better Alone"
7. "Here & Now"
8. "Reason"

Electric set:

1. "Beautiful Intentions"
2. "Yeh Yeh Yeh"
3. "Home"
4. "Northern Star"
5. "Never Be the Same Again"
6. "When You're Gone"
7. "Goin' Down"
8. "Next Best Superstar"
9. "You'll Get Yours"
10. "First Day of My Life"
11. "I Turn to You"

Easter eggs

These videos can be accessed by clicking on various chapter buttons on Windows Media Player

1. "Beautiful Intentions" Rehearsals/Live Video
2. "First Day of My Life" Live Video

== Release history ==
Country	Date
United Kingdom	30 October 2006
Europe	December 2006
Brazil	2 November 2009

=== Charts ===
Chart	Position
UK music DVDs and Videos Chart	10
Portuguese music DVDs and Videos Chart	19
