= Rock Me (Melanie C song) =

2011 song by Melanie C

Single by Melanie C

from the album The Sea
- B-side: "Stop This Train"
- Released: 24 June 2011
- Length: 3:11
- Label: Red Girl
- Songwriter(s): Melanie Chisholm; Dave Roth; David Jost
- Producer(s): Andy Chatterley; Dave Roth

Melanie C singles chronology
"Understand" (2008)	"Rock Me" (2011)	"Think About It" (2011)

Music video
- "Rock Me" on YouTube

"Rock Me" is a song by English singer Melanie C. It was co-written by Dave Roth and David Jost and produced by Roth and Andy Chatterley for her fifth studio album, The Sea (2011). The song was released as the album's first single on 24 June 2011 in Germany, also serving as the official theme song for German TV channel ZDF's coverage of the 2011 FIFA Women's World Cup.

== Chart performance ==
"Rock Me" debuted and peaked at number 38 on the German Singles Chart, spending three weeks in the chart.

== Music video ==
A music video for "Rock Me" was directed by German filmmaker Marcus Sternberg and filmed at the Projekts Skatepark in Manchester. It features Melanie C dancing around in the skate park, and in front of a wall with letters "Rock Me" painted on it. The visuals premiered online on 7 June 2011.

== Track listings ==
CD single
No.	Title	Writer(s)	Producer(s)	Length
1.	"Rock Me"	Melanie Chisholm; Dave Roth; David Jost	Andy Chatterley; Roth	3:14
2.	"Stop This Train"	Chisholm; Peter-John Vettese	Vettese	4:00

Digital single
No.	Title	Writer(s)	Producer(s)	Length
1.	"Rock Me"	Chisholm; Roth; Jost	Chatterley; Roth	3:14
2.	"Stop This Train"	Chisholm; Peter-John Vettese	Vettese	4:00
3.	"Rock Me" (dance mix)	Chisholm; Roth; Jost	Chatterley; Roth	3:29
4.	"Rock Me" (music video)			3:12

== Credits and personnel ==
Credits adapted from the liner notes of The Sea.

- Andy Chatterley – engineer, producer
- Melanie Chisholm – vocals, writer
- David Jost – writer
- Dave Roth – producer, writer
- Jason Tarver – engineer

== Chart ==
Weekly chart performance for "Rock Me"
Chart (2011)	Peak position
Belarus (Unistar Top 20)	4
Germany (GfK)	38

== Release history ==
Release dates for "Rock Me"
Region	Date	Format	Label	Ref.
Germany	24 June 2011	CD single; digital download	313 Music; Warner Music; Red Girl	
