= Weak (Melanie C song) =

2011 song by Melanie C

Single by Melanie C

from the album The Sea
- B-side: "Stronger"
- Released: 6 November 2011
- Length: 3:24
- Label: Red Girl
- Songwriter(s): Melanie Chisholm; Ina Wroldsen; Jez Ashurt
- Producer(s): Andy Chatterley

Melanie C singles chronology
"Think About It" (2011)	"Weak" (2011)	"Let There Be Love" (2011)

Music video
- "Weak" on YouTube

"Weak" is a song by English singer Melanie C from her fifth studio album The Sea (2011). It was written by Melanie C, Ina Wroldsen and Jez Ashurt, while production was overseen by Andy Chatterley, with Peter-John Vettese credited as a vocal producer. The song was released by Red Girl Records as the album's third single on 6 November 2011 and peaked at number 15 on the UK Independent Singles Chart.

== Background ==
"Weak" was written by Melanie C along with Ina Wroldsen and Jez Ashurt. Production on the track was overseen by Andy Chatterley, while Peter-John Vettese served as a vocal producer. A contrast from the previous dance-pop single "Think About It", "Weak" was described a stirring pop ballad that emotionally covered the range of emotions faced when you break up with a loved one. The song was placed on the BBC Radio 2 A-list Radio Playlist. Melanie C performed the song on The Sea – Live tour.

== Critical reception ==
Reviews of "Weak" were generally positive, with Entertainment Focus stating that it was "one of the highlights from The Sea and finds Melanie on fine vocal form. A slow-building beat backs Melanie’s distinctive vocals as she sings about being too weak to leave a relationship that is no good for her. The bridge is very powerful with Melanie’s vocals sending shivers down your spine as she lets rip." Ben Weisz from MusicOMH found that "on "Weak," Chisholm simply shouldn’t be attempting Destiny's Child-style belting with her distinctive voice, which just grates as whiney when forced in that direction. She's better when slivers of her own musical personality appear to force their way through.

== Music video ==
A music video for "Weak" was directed by Michael Baldwin and filmed in a London hotel room. It shows the premise of Melanie C's former lover dancing with another woman, whilst she is still in pain and suffering. The visuals premiered a week before the single dropped.

== Track listings ==
CD single
No.	Title	Writer(s)	Producer(s)	Length
1.	"Weak"	Melanie Chisholm; Ina Wroldsen; Jez Ashurt	Andy Chatterley	3:24
2.	"Stronger"	Chisholm; Lars Aass; Ole Henrik Antonsen; Shelly Poole	Jim & Jack	3:32

Digital single
No.	Title	Writer(s)	Producer(s)	Length
1.	"Weak"	Chisholm; Wroldsen; Ashurt	Chatterley	3:24
2.	"Stronger"	Chisholm; Aass; Antonsen; Poole	Jim & Jack	3:32
3.	"Weak" (acapella)	Chisholm; Wroldsen; Ashurt	Chatterley	3:19
4.	"Weak" (Instrumental)	Chisholm; Wroldsen; Ashurt	Chatterley	3:24

== Credits and personnel ==
Credits adapted from the liner notes of The Sea.

- Jez Ashurt – writer
- Andy Chatterley – recording engineer, producer
- Melanie Chisholm – writer
- Mark "Tuffy" Evans – mixing engineer
- Jason Tarver – recording engineer
- Peter-John Vettese – vocal producer
- Ina Wroldsen – writer

== Charts ==
Weekly chart performance for "Weak"
Chart (2011)	Peak position
Belarus (Unistar Top 20)	4
UK Indie (OCC)	15
