= Peter Aristone =

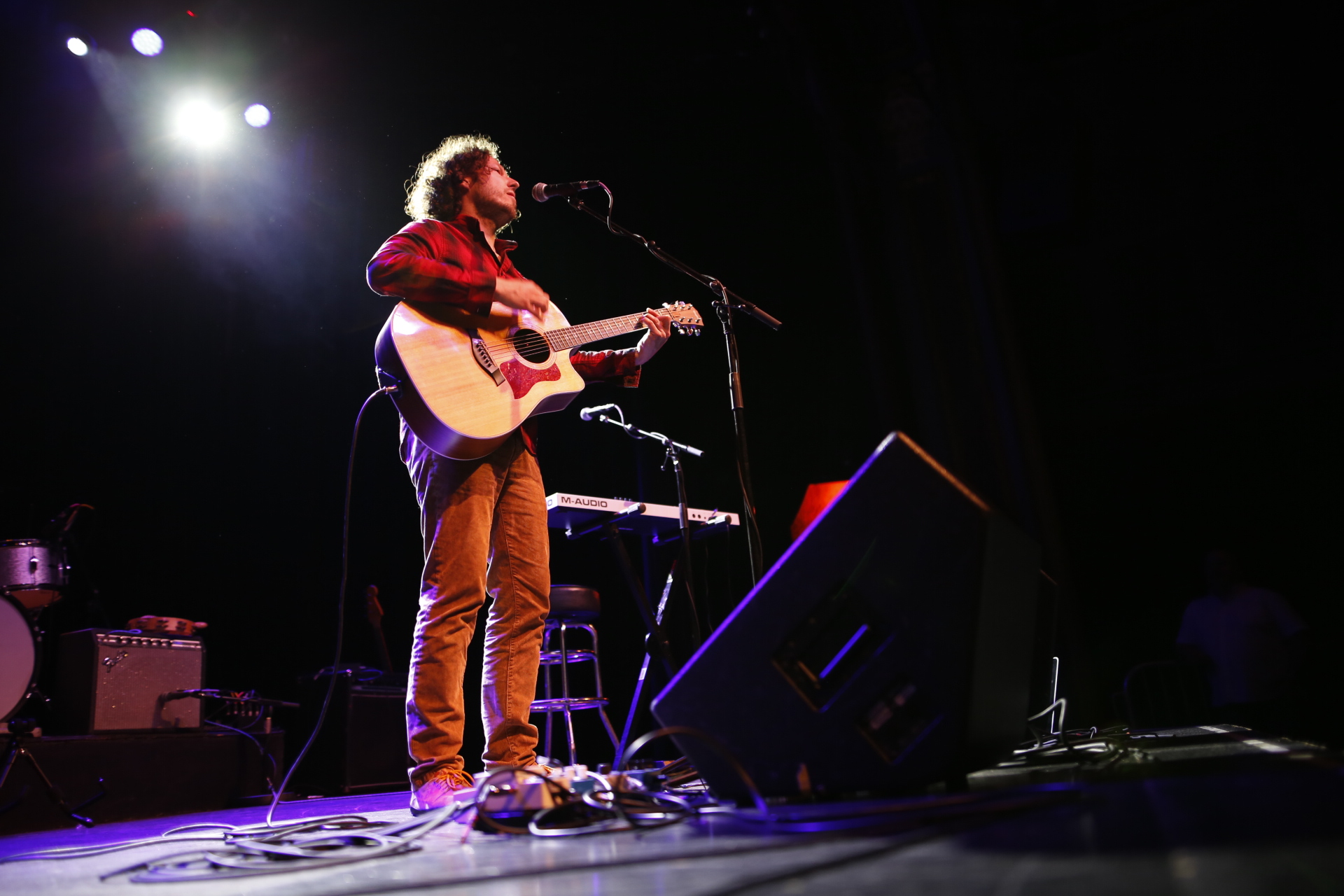

Background information
- Born: 4 June 1980 (age 45); Bratislava
- Occupation: Singer-songwriter
- Instrument: Guitar

Peter Aristone (born 4 June 1980, in Bratislava) is a Slovak singer-songwriter, multi-instrumentalist and producer based in Prague, Czech republic. Early in his career, he was a member of progressive metal band Personal Signet and pop band Popcorn Drama. His first solo album 19 Days in Tetbury was released in March 2014 with the following EPs Gold (2016) and Happiest Accidents (2017) marking a significant shift from pop to more folk and indie rock oriented sound. His second solo album The Hit was released in June 2020.

== Career ==
Peter Aristone studied voice and music production at the Jazz Music Conservatory in Prague going on to become a sound engineer. He mixed and mastered many Czech albums afterwards. After going through a few bands he found success with his pop band Popcorn Drama that recorded an album Včera bude with the renowned Carmen Rizzo producing. After topping a Czech pop chart with the single from the album, Peter disbanded Popcorn Drama to pursue his solo career. While songwriting and recording in studios in London, he met with the producer and frequent collaborator of the Welsh band Manic Street Preachers Greg Haver who then produced Peter's first album 19 Days in Tetbury (2014). It featured guest appearances by the frontman of Manic Street Preachers James Dean Bradfield, and Melanie C from Spice Girls.

After two years of extensive live performing and opening for major Czech and Slovak arena bands, Aristone released EP Gold (2016) that was produced by English producer and songwriter Sacha Skarbek. It was Skarbek who pointed a new direction in Peter's music as the EP represents a major shift to folk sound with indie elements. The eponymous single and the second single Fire Inside found a success in the USA as well as the music video for the former won the MTV U contest. Next EP Happiest Accidents (2017), again being produced by Skarbek and featuring heavier but still similar to Gold style, was released a year later. Both EP's brought him attention in the United States where he toured many times since.

In June 2020 a new album The Hit was released. It was written and recorded with an array of international songwriters and musicians as well as Peter's own live band members for the first time. It was produced mainly by Mark Plati, known for being a producer, sound engineer and guitarist for David Bowie and for the first time co-produced by Aristone himself. For the first time Peter's own studio was one of those used for recording and producing the album. As of August 2020 the albums's second single Far was the fifth most played song in the Czech airplay.

Apart from being an active musician, Peter is also acclaimed mixer, engineer and producer. He owns and runs recording studio Aristone Studio and in 2020 he launched his own label Funborn-music that seeks to discover and produce emerging artists.

== Discography ==
=== Solo ===
- 19 Days in Tetbury (2014)
- Gold (EP, 2016)
- Happiest Accidents (EP, 2017)
- The Hit (2020)

=== With Popcorn Drama ===
- Včera bude (2012)

=== With Personal Signet ===
- Wires (EP, 2012)
- Fundamental Human Instinct (2014)
