= Aren't You Kind of Glad We Did? =

Song by George and Ira Gershwin

"Aren't You Kind of Glad We Did?" is a song composed by George Gershwin, with lyrics by Ira Gershwin. Ira Gershwin added the lyrics in the mid-1940s, to an unused tune by his brother, George.

It was introduced by Betty Grable and Dick Haymes in the 1947 film The Shocking Miss Pilgrim.

== Notable recordings ==
Many other artists have also recorded the song, including:

- Peggy Lee along with Dave Barbour and His Orchestra (1946)
- Ella Fitzgerald on Ella Fitzgerald Sings the George and Ira Gershwin Song Book (1959)
- Melanie C recorded the song for her musical theatre-inspired album Stages (2012)
