= Think About It (Melanie C song) =

2011 song by Melanie C

Single by Melanie C

from the album The Sea
- B-side: "Cruel Intentions"; "Rock Me"
- Released: 4 September 2011
- Genre: Pop rock; bubblegum pop; dance-pop
- Length: 3:48 (album version); 3:16 (radio edit)
- Label: Red Girl
- Songwriters: Adam Argyle; Melanie Chisholm; Daniel Davidsen; Jason Gill; Mich Hansen
- Producers: Cutfather; Davidsen; Gill

Melanie C singles chronology
"Rock Me" (2011)	"Think About It" (2011)	"Weak" (2011)

Music video
- "Think About It" on YouTube

"Think About It" is a song by English singer Melanie C from her fifth studio album, The Sea (2011). It was co-written by Adam Argyle, Daniel Davidsen, Jason Gill, and Mich "Cutfather" Hansen, while production was helmed by Davidsen, Gill, and Hansen. The song is a dance-pop song that also fuses the usual rock-stance Melanie had taken in her career since 1999. Lyrically the song discusses doing something that you know you shouldn't. "Think About It" was released by Red Girl Records on 4 September 2011 as the album's worldwide lead single and general second single after "Rock Me."

The song gathered critical acclaim, and critics considered it a welcome change, seen as a better release than the previous, "Rock Me." Critics also enjoyed her new-found pop style and found it to be a good introduction to her fifth studio album The Sea. Commercially, "Think About It" was a moderate hit, reaching the top 30 in Switzerland, while also peaking at number 6 on the Billboard's Dance Singles Sales chart. A music video directed Howard Greenhalgh showed her perform against different backdrops and in different outfits throughout. Melanie C performed this on The Sea – Live tour.

== Background ==
Melanie C was one fifth of the girl-band Spice Girls and has been releasing solo material since 1999, her previous studio album entitled This Time was released four years prior to the release of "Think About It". In the time she spent between records by her own record label named Red Girl Records, Melanie completed a stint performing in the West End, in the musical Blood Brothers and also became a mother. It was after this time that she started work on her fifth studio album, with the experience from "singing regularly over 6 months" left her confident and strengthened as a vocalist, and left her more confident in the songwriting area also. Melanie spent time recording worldwide and after a track from these sessions titled "Rock Me" was released as a part of the German TV channel's coverage of the FIFA Women's World Cup. Soon after, she announced the release of the lead single from The Sea titled "Think About It".

== Development ==
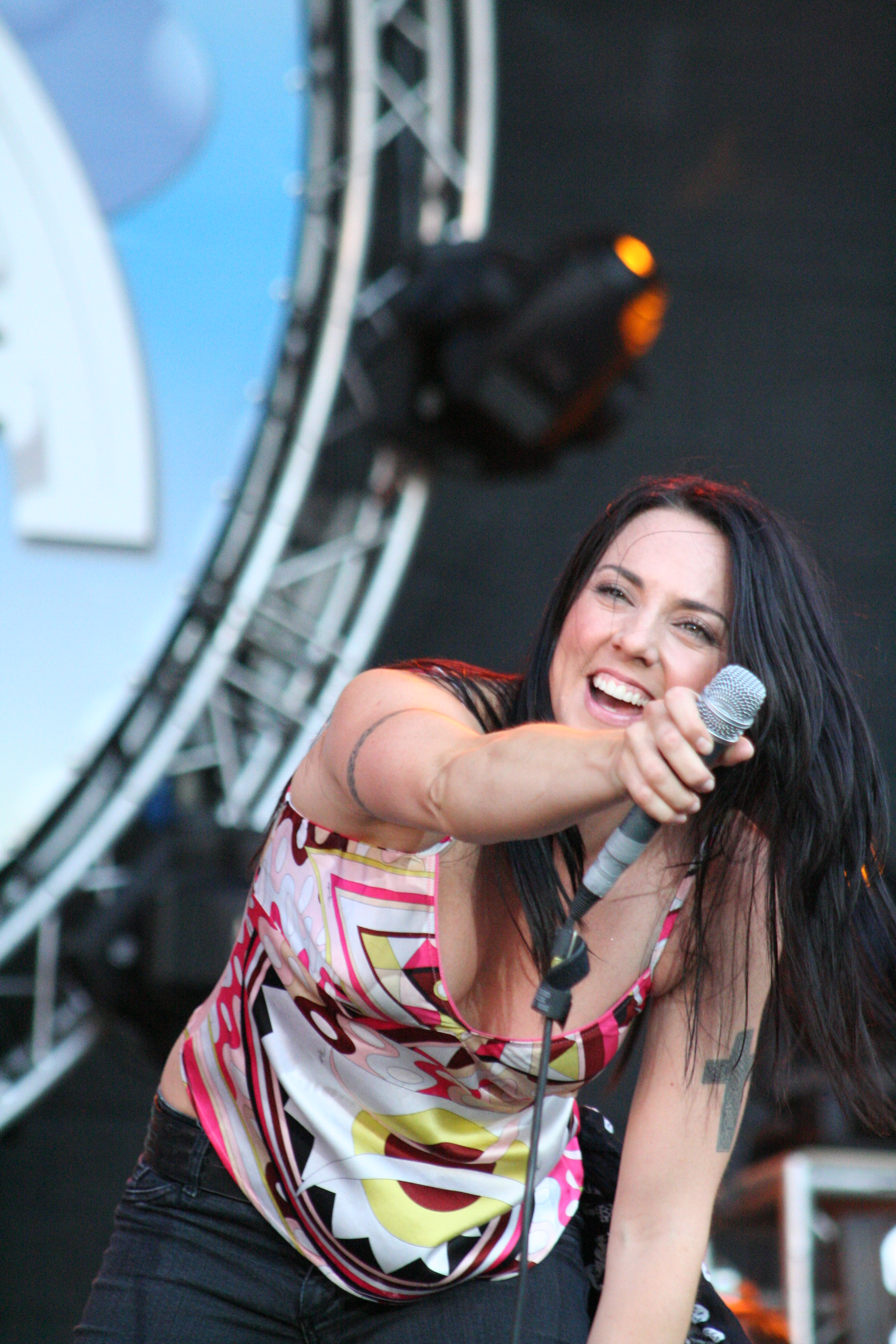
Melanie C (pictured) performing in a German music festival.

Melanie C's own independent record label announced the track on her official website stating the track was written in Copenhagen with producers Adam Argyle and the Cutfather team, and saying "We are incredibly excited to announce Melanie's brand new single – 'Think About It'. Taken from the forthcoming album 'The Sea', the track was written in Copenhagen with Adam Argyle and new collaborators the Cutfather team – who also produced the song. The single is a fresh sound for Melanie; an elevating chorus and enriching melody, basked in light and colour is perfect for the summer." When writing a Question and Answer session on her official website for the single "Rock Me", she was asked about the producer of "Think About It" Adam Argyle to which she responded;

"My good buddy Adam Argyle features heavily on the album. He's such a brilliant songwriter and I think we're a good team. We collaborated with some fantastic new people too like Jodie Marr. She is incredible and one of my favourite songs came from that session. Another great song came from a session with Adam & Martin Brammer. We took a trip over to Copenhagen and worked with Cutfather, which was some of the best few days working on this album with great results."

== Composition ==
"Think About It" sees Melanie move away from her more rock-influenced sound that she had spent time crafting in years prior. Incorporating "a more electronic and layered production style", the song has been described as a "summer track", with an "infectious melody". The single has been compared to some of the music featured on her debut solo album titled Northern Star, whilst being described as a "poppier dance feel", it has elements of dance-music. Lyrically the song discusses doing something "you know you shouldn't", with lyrics stating "you only regret what you don't do". Lewis Corner from Digital Spy described the track as a "Cutfather-helmed combination of modish guitar riffs and pulsating house beats" and called the song a mix between the bubblegum-pop themes of artist Katy Perry and power-anthem themes by artist Kelly Clarkson. With the lyrics "If there's a chance we'll break, I want to smash into pieces", Corner claimed that the track falls under a "Euro-friendly" category. DJ Ron Slomowicz of About.com described the track as a "fast-paced pop rock track" and compared the song further to, Kelly Clarkson but noted it had similarities to tracks by Avril Lavigne but stated it "most closely resembles "Raise Your Glass" by P!nk".

== Critical reception ==
Pip Ellwood of Entertainment Focus felt that it is "Melanie's strongest single release for some time", Ellwood positively described the recent "pop influences" within the track, and found that she has "let her hair down" with the track, and concluded the review noting "It has certainly peaked our interest in Melanie's new album The Sea." Lewis Corner of Digital Spy also gave a positive review starting his response with "When whispers of a pop comeback for Melanie C first surfaced last year, we'll readily admit that we were intrigued" and felt that the track was an appropriate "trailer" for the album. DJ Ron Slomowicz of About.com listed the song as a "Song of the Day" calling it a comeback he stated "It works incredibly well in Mel's favor, giving her one of her strongest singles since her debut album. If you aren't tapping your foot, bopping your head, humming along, or going crazy, then maybe you're thinking too much." Slomowicz called it an expectation of what is to come on her The Sea record and claimed it showcases "not only modern product" but the "beauty of Melanie's voice". A writer for Popjustice expressed disappointment with the previous single "Rock Me", and called Melanie's comeback "probably one of pop's least necessary", however Popjustice concluded there response with "As it turns out, if you're able to somehow hear past Mel's sometimes rather alarming vocals, 'Think About It' is precisely four types of brilliant" and listed the track as "Song of the Day".

== Commercial performance ==
The single peaked at number 6 on the Official US Billboard charts. In Austria, the single spent two weeks on the chart, and peaked at number 34, similarly in Switzerland the song spent two weeks on the chart but peaked at number 32. In Germany the single spent four weeks on the chart peaking at number 48 whilst in the United Kingdom the single peaked at number 15 on the Indie charts.

== Music video ==
Melanie in the video for "Think About It", the backdrop of the video changes throughout and shows Melanie surrounded by glitter at times.

A music video for "Think About It" was released, directed by Howard Greenhalgh, her official website described it saying it "provides the song with a varied canvas – bursts of vivid colour and imagery – that's if you can try and take your eyes off Melanie in a selection of stunning outfits!" The video premiered on 15 July 2011 and starts showing Melanie lip-synch the track with an ever-changing backdrop, that shows different colors and imagery. After the first chorus, Melanie's outfits then start to change and the video consistently shows shots of different outfits and backgrounds including one showing fireworks and another showing glitter. During the final scenes, Melanie is shown to be pulling a sheet of black material which she then dancers in front of, and another shot shows Melanie removing items of clothing.

== Track listings ==
- Limited Edition 4 Track CD single (Red Girl)
1. "Think About It"
2. "Cruel Intentions"
3. "Rock Me" (Radio Edit)
4. "Rock Me" (Steve More Radio Edit)
- Digital 4 track EP (Red Girl)
1. "Think About It"
2. "Cruel Intentions"
3. "Think About It" (Acapella)
4. "Think About It" (Instrumental)
- Digital 4 Track Remix Bundle (Red Girl)
1. "Think About It" (7th Heaven Club Mix)
2. "Think About It" (Groovesplitters Club Mix)
3. "Think About It" (More & Masters 'Big Room' Mix)
4. "Think About It" (Music video)
- 2 Track CD single (Warner Music)
1. "Think About It"
2. "Cruel Intentions"
- Digital 4 Track EP (Warner Music)
1. "Think About It"
2. "Cruel Intentions"
3. "Think About It" (7th Heaven Club Mix)
4. "Think About It" (Music video)

== Credits and personnel ==
Credits adapted from the liner notes of The Sea.

- Adam Argyle – writer
- Melanie Chisholm – writer
- Daniel Davidsen – producer, writer
- Jason Gill – producer, writer
- Mich "Cutfather" Hansen – producer, writer
- Mads Nilsson – mixing engineer

== Charts ==
Weekly chart performance for "Think About It"
Chart (2011)	Peak position
Belarus (Unistar Top 20)	8
Austria (Ö3 Austria Top 40)	34
Germany (GfK)	48
Switzerland (Schweizer Hitparade)	30
UK Singles (OCC)	95
UK Indie (OCC)	15
US Dance Singles Sales (Billboard)	6

== Release history ==
Release history and formats for "Think About It"
Region	Date	Format	Label	Ref.
Various	4 September 2011	Digital download	Red Girl	
