= Let There Be Love (Melanie C song) =

2011 song by Melanie C

Single by Melanie C

from the album The Sea
- B-side: "Stronger"
- Released: 2 December 2011
- Length: 3:24
- Label: Red Girl
- Songwriters: Peter Plate; Ulf Leo Sommer; Hanne Sørvaag
- Producers: Daniel Faust; Peter Plate; Ulf Leo Sommer

Melanie C singles chronology
"Weak" (2011)	"Let There Be Love" (2011)	"I Know Him So Well" (2012)

Music video
- "Let There Be Love" on YouTube

"Let There Be Love" is a song by English singer Melanie C from her fifth studio album The Sea (2011). An English-language cover of the German song "Liebe ist alles" by German pop duo Rosenstolz, it was written by Peter Plate, Ulf Leo Sommer, and Hanne Sørvaag, while production was helmed by Plate, Sommer, and Daniel Faust. Melanie C performed the song on The Sea – Live tour.

== Background ==
"Let There Be Love" is an English language cover of the German song "Liebe ist alles" by German pop duo Rosenstolz from their 2004 Herz. Originally written by band members Peter Plate and AnNa R. along with Ulf Leo Sommer, the English lyrics for "Let There Be Love" were penned by Norwegian singer Hanne Sørvaag. The song was unknown to Melanie C until Plate sent a demo version to her. He asked her if she could create an English version of his biggest hit and invited her to Berlin. The singer called recording the song "a big challenge! I think the English translation turned out really well, too. And I hope that his German fans will like our version, because it is obviously very different from the original."

== Music video ==
A music video for "Let There Be Love" was directed by Marcus Gerwinat and filmed during a sunny autumn day on Brighton's seafront. The visuals depitcts Melanie on a street along the beach (a homage to her album The Sea, and also where the album was recorded). The visuals also feature different couples kissing and cuddling with each other, at various different places near the beach and Brighton Pier. As Melanie sings, the names of couples appear to be written onto a wall she is singing in front of.

== Track listings ==
Digital single
No.	Title	Writer(s)	Producer(s)	Length
1.	"Let There Be Love"	Peter Plate; Ulf Leo Sommer; Hanne Sørvaag	Plate	3:32
2.	"Stronger"	Chisholm; Lars Aass; Ole Henrik Antonsen; Shelly Poole	Jim & Jack	3:32
Total length:				7:04

== Credits and personnel ==
Credits adapted from the liner notes of The Sea.

- Melanie Chisholm – vocals
- Daniel Faust – mixing, producer
- Peter Plate – mixing, producer, writer
- Ulf Leo Sommer – mixing, producer, writer
- Hanne Sørvaag – writer

== Release history ==
Release history and formats for "Let There Be Love"
Region	Date	Format	Label	Ref.
Various	2 December 2011	Digital download; CD single	Red Girl	
