= FanFan's World =

范范的世界

Studio album by Christine Fan
- Released: November 2000
- Genre: C-Pop
- Label: Decca Records Taiwan(now Linfair Records)

Christine Fan chronology
范范的世界 (2000)	太陽 (2001)

FanFan's World (Chinese: 范范的世界; pinyin: FànFàn de shì jiè) is FanFan's first album released in November 2000.

== Track listing ==
1. 我的初世紀 (My First World)
2. 因為 (Because)
3. 想太多 (Thinking Too Much)
4. 每天 (Everyday)
5. 如果我有一支天使棒 (If I Had an Angel's Wand)
6. 潔癖 (Mysophobia)
7. You Have a Black Heart
8. 到不了 (Can't Arrive)
9. 我們是朋友 (We're Friends)
10. 不要哭 (Don't Cry)
11. 拜拜 (Bye Bye)
