= Andy Chatterley =

British record producer, songwriter

- Also known as: Yum Yum, The Droyds, Edison
- Born: Andrew Chatterley; 8 May 1973 (age 53); Jersey, Channel Islands
- Genre: Pop
- Occupations: Songwriter, record producer, musician, remixer
- Instruments: Synthesizer, keyboards
- Years active: 1992–present

Andy Chatterley (born 8 May 1973) is a British record producer and songwriter. He is also the CEO of online content protection company MUSO.

== Early life ==
Chatterly was born in Jersey, Channel Islands. He attended Victoria College.

== Career ==
As a record producer and songwriter, Chatterley has worked with artists such as the Pussycat Dolls, Kanye West, Diana Vickers, Melanie C, Siobhan Fahey, Theoretical Girl, and Bright Light Bright Light.

Chatterley co-wrote and produced the title track "Aphrodite" by Kylie Minogue, as well as the single "Better than Today" from the album Aphrodite (2010). Chatterley co-wrote "Put Your Hands Up" by Nerina Pallot, the lead single from her fourth album Year of the Wolf (2011).

Chatterley co-wrote and produced all of Can't Stand The Silence by Rea Garvey and produced and co-wrote singles "Can't Stand The Silence", "Heart of an Enemy" and "Wild Love".

Chatterley worked as an off-screen coach on the television show The Voice of Germany for Rea Garvey's team, and an on screen coach for The Voice of Germany 2012, producing the finalists' singles in 2011 and 2012. He also produced the album Stay Who You Are for the winner of the 2012 edition Nick Howard, including the single "Unbreakable".

Chatterley is the co-founder and director of an anti-piracy company that helps rightholders within the media industries protect their content online. He also owns a recording studio complex in North London. He was co-founder of Saved Records, which he started with DJ Nic Fanciulli in 2003. Previously, he had owned Sperm Records.

== Personal life ==
Chatterley is married to singer-songwriter Nerina Pallot.
