= List of awards and nominations received by Melanie Chisholm =

Melanie C awards and nominations
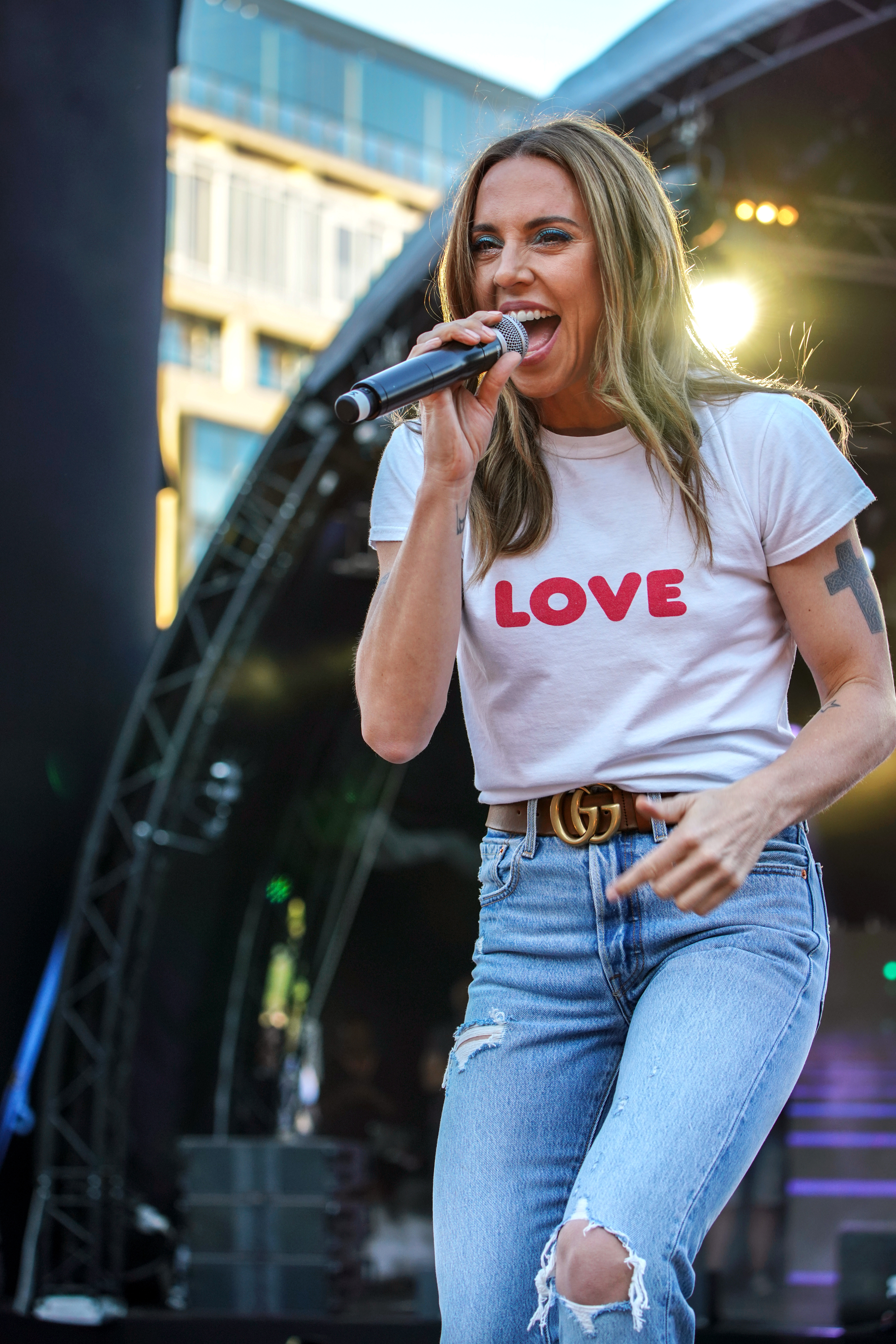
- Melanie C in 2018
Awards and nominations
Award	Wins	Nominations
Brit	0	1
Ivor Novello	0	1
Laurence Olivier	0	1
MTV Europe	0	3

Totals (Note: Certain award groups do not simply award one winner. They acknowledge several different recipients, have runners-up, and have third place. Since this is a specific recognition and is different from losing an award, runner-up mentions are considered wins in this award tally. For simplification and to avoid errors, each award in this list has been presumed to have had a prior nomination.)
- Wins: 22
- Nominations: 54

Melanie C is an English singer, songwriter, DJ, actress, dancer, entrepreneur, television personality and fitness model. She rose to fame in 1996, releasing, in two years with the Spice Girls, two consecutive number one albums, eight number one singles from nine worldwide hits, the biggest-selling debut single of all time and the biggest-selling album in music history by a girl group, respectively with "Wannabe" atop in 37 countries with over seven million records, and Spice, which peaked at number one in more than 17 countries across the world, with over 31 million copies, as well as the second album Spiceworld with more than 20 million copies sold. Melanie C is known for her unique vocal prowess that helped shoot the Spice Girls to international stardom. Chisholm began her solo career in late 1998 by singing with Canadian rock singer Bryan Adams, and her solo debut album Northern Star was released in 1999, reaching number one in Sweden and number 4 on the UK Albums Chart. It was certified internationally with seven platinum and three gold certifications, including the triple-Platinum by the British Phonographic Industry, selling over 4 million copies worldwide, and becoming the best selling solo album of any Spice Girls member.

Having co-written 11 UK number ones, more than any other female artist in chart history, she remains the only female performer to top the charts as a solo artist, as part of a duo, quartet and quintet. With twelve UK number one singles, including the charity single as part of The Justice Collective, she is the second female artist – and the first British female artist – with most singles at number one in the United Kingdom, and with a total of fourteen songs that have received the number one in Britain (including the double A-sides), Chisholm is the female artist with most songs at number one in the UK ranking history. Her work has earned her several awards and nominations, including three Guinness World Record book mentions, three World Music Awards, one IFPI European Platinum Awards, three MTV Europe Music Awards from ten nominations, five Brit Awards from ten nominations, two Ivor Novello Awards from four nomination, ten ASCAP awards, three American Music Awards, four Billboard Music Awards from seven nomination, six Billboard special awards from nine nominations, one MTV Video Music Awards from two nomination, one Echo Awards from four nominations, one Eska Music Awards, and one Juno Award from two nominations. In addition, she gained one Laurence Olivier nomination and one WhatsOnStage Award for her theatrical work. Since 1996, Chisholm has sold more than 131 million records, including 100 million copies with the group, and 30 million solo albums, singles and collaborations, and has earned over 339 worldwide certifications (with numerous diamonds), including 46 silver, gold and platinum certifications as a solo artist.

== Awards and nominations ==
List of awards and nominations received by Melanie C as a solo artist
Year	Award	Category	For	Result
1998	The Sun's 1998 Readers Poll	Best English singer	Herself	Won
1999	Top Of The Pops 99's Readers Poll	Top Girl in the last 5 years	Herself	Won
1999	Hungarian Music Awards	Contemporary Rock Album of the Year	Northern Star	Nominated
1999	Smash Hits Poll Awards	Best Rock Act	Herself	Nominated
2000	IFPI Europe Platinum Awards	Album Platinum Award	Northern Star	Won
2000	Music Television Awards	Best Album	Northern Star	Nominated
2000	Music Television Awards	Best New Act	Herself	Nominated
2000	Guinness Book	First British singer to have 11 number 1 singles (solos and group together) on the charts in the UK	Herself	Won
2000	Hall of Fame – The Best Of The Year 2000 (Folha & Teen UOL)	Best International Female Artist	Herself	Won
2000	TMF Awards	Best International Female Artist	Herself	Nominated
2000	TMF Awards	Best Video	Never Be the Same Again	Nominated
2000	Festivalbar	Summer Song of the Year	Never Be the Same Again	Nominated
2000	MTV Europe Music Awards	Best Song	Never Be the Same Again	Nominated
2000	MTV Europe Music Awards	Best Female	Herself	Nominated
2000	MTV Europe Music Awards	Best New Act	Herself	Nominated
2000	Brit Awards	Best British Female	Herself	Nominated
2001	Capital FM Radio Awards	Best British Female	Herself	Nominated
2001	NRJ Radio Awards	Best International Song of the Year	Never Be The Same Again	Nominated
2001	NRJ Radio Awards	Best International Female Artist of Year	Herself	Nominated
2001	Echo Awards	Best International Female Artist of Year	Herself	Nominated
2001	Echo Awards	Best International Single of the Year	I Turn to You	Nominated
2001	Hungarian Music Awards	Foreign Contemporary Rock Album of the Year	Northern Star	Nominated
2001	Ivor Novello Awards	International Hit Of The Year	I Turn to You	Nominated
2001	TMF Awards	Best Single	I Turn to You	Nominated
2001	Smash Hits Poll Awards	Best Female Solo Artist	Herself	Nominated
2001	Scouseology Awards	Best work of an artist on the Internet	Herself	Won
2003	Scouseology Awards	Best work of an artist on the Internet	Herself	Won
2003	Scouseology Awards	Music Award	Herself	Won
2003	National Music Awards	Best Female	Herself	Nominated
2003	Festivalbar	Summer Song of the Year	On the Horizon	Nominated
2005	Festivalbar	Summer Song of the Year	Next Best Superstar	Nominated
2005	German Radio Awards	Best International Female Artist	Herself	Won
2006	Radio Regenbogen	Best International Female Artist	Herself	Won
2006	Eska Music Awards	Best International Female Artist	Herself	Won
2006	Echo Awards	Hit of the Year	First Day of My Life	Nominated
2006	Amadeus Awards	Best International Single of the Year	First Day of My Life	Nominated
2010	Laurence Olivier Awards	Best Actress in a Musical or Entertainment	Herself	Nominated
2010	Evening Standard Theatre Award	The Milton Shulman Award for Outstanding Newcomer	Herself	Nominated
2011	Radio Forth Awards	'Music Recognition' Award	Herself	Won
2012	TVTimes Awards	Best Newcomer	Herself	Nominated
2013	WhatsOnStage Awards	'Best Supporting Actress in a Musical'	Jesus Christ Superstar	Won
2013	Tesco Celebrity Mum of the Year	Celebrity Mum of the Year	Herself	Won
2015	British LGBT Awards	Celebrity Ally	Herself	Nominated
2018	Boisdale Music Awards	Best Female Singer	Herself	Nominated
2021	Gaffa Awards	Best International Solo Act	Herself	Nominated
2021	Gaffa Awards	Best International Album	Melanie C	Nominated
2021	British LGBT Awards	Top 10 Celebrity Ally	Herself	Won
2022	Music Week Women in Music Awards 2022	Inspirational Artist	Herself	Won
2023	Northern Music Awards	SJM Concerts Special Recognition Outstanding Contribution to Music Award	Herself	Won
2026	Official Charts Company	Official Specialist Number 1 Award	Sweat	Won
2026	Official Charts Company	Official Top 10 Award	Sweat	Won
2026	O2 Silver Clef Awards	Global Impact Award	Herself	Won
2026	BPI	National Album Day Champion	Herself	Won
2026	BPI	3x Platinum Certified Award Trophy	Northern Star	Won
