= Reason Tour =

2003 concert tour by Melanie C

- Tour by Melanie C
- Location: Europe
- Associated album: Reason
- Start date: 24 April 2003
- End date: 17 December 2003
- No. of shows: 25

Melanie C concert chronology
- Northern Star Tour (2000–01); Reason Tour (2003); The Barfly Mini-Tour (2004)

The Reason Tour (also known as the On a Mission Tour) was the third set of concerts performed by English singer Melanie C. The tour ran from 24 April until 17 December 2003.

== Setlist ==
Leg 1
- "Yeh Yeh Yeh"
- "Let's Love"
- "Here It Comes Again"
- "Water"
- "Lose Myself in You"
- "Melt"
- "Soul Boy"
- "Do I"
- "If That Were Me"
- "Never Be the Same Again"
- "Positively Somewhere"
- "When You're Gone"
- "Home"
- "Goin' Down"
- "Go!"
- "I Wish"
- "On the Horizon
- "Suddenly Monday"
- "Reason"
- "I Turn to You"
Leg 2
- "Yeh, Yeh, Yeh"
- "Let's Love"
- "Here It Comes Again"
- "Northern Star / If That Were Me"
- "Be the One"
- "Never Be the Same Again"
- "Positively Somewhere"
- "On the Horizon"
- "When You're Gone"
- "Home"
- "Goin' Down"
- "Suddenly Monday"
- "Go!"
- "I Turn to You"

== Personnel ==
- Melanie C – vocals
- Fergus Gerrand – drums/musical director
- Paul Gendler – guitar
- Greg Hatwell – guitar/backing vocals
- Georgina 'Grog' Lisee – bass/backing vocals (leg 1)
- Jenni Tarma – bass guitar (leg 2)
- Sarah de Courcy-Aston – keyboards/backing vocals

== Broadcasts and recordings ==
On 9 May 2003, the Shepherd's Bush Empire concert was webcast on MelanieC.net, and has since then been uploaded to her YouTube channel. In November 2003, the Avo Session Basel concert was broadcast on 3sat.

== Tour dates ==
Date	City	Country	Venue
Leg 1
24 April 2003	Middlesbrough	England	Town Hall
25 April 2003	Glasgow	Scotland	Academy
26 April 2003	Liverpool	England	Royal Court
28 April 2003	Manchester	England	Apollo
29 April 2003	York	England	Barbican
2 May 2003	Bristol	England	Academy
3 May 2003	Oxford	England	Apollo
4 May 2003	Ipswich	England	Regent
6 May 2003	Norwich	England	UEA
7 May 2003	Southampton	England	Southampton Guildhall
8 May 2003	London	England	Shepherd's Bush Empire
9 May 2003	London	England	Shepherd's Bush Empire
11 May 2003	Belfast	Northern Ireland	Waterfront Hall
12 May 2003	Dublin	Ireland	Olympia
19 May 2003	Madrid	Spain	Pop Festival
30 May 2003	Milan	Italy	Festivalbar
Leg 2
23 October 2003	Brussels	Belgium	Radio Donna Center
1 November 2003	Basel	Switzerland	Avo Session Basel
9 December 2003	Cologne	Germany	E-Werk
10 December 2003	Hanover	Germany	The Neues Theater
12 December 2003	Berlin	Germany	Columbia Club
13 December 2003	Hamburg	Germany	Hamburg State Opera
15 December 2003	Neu-Isenburg	Germany	Hugenottenhalle
16 December 2003	Munich	Germany	Elserhalle
17 December 2003	Filderstadt	Germany	Central Theater
