= Sweat (Melanie C album) =

- Standard and digital deluxe cover

Studio album by Melanie C
- Released: 1 May 2026
- Recorded: 2023–2026
- Genres: Dance; house; nu-disco; pop
- Length: 41:23
- Label: Red Girl Media
- Producers: Klas Åhlund; James Greenwood; Sam de Jong; Kingdoms; Alex Metric; Luis Navidad; Novodor; Oscar Scheller; Jon Shave

Melanie C chronology
Melanie C (2020)	Sweat (2026)

Singles from Melanie C
- 1. "Sweat" Released: 17 October 2025; 2. "What Could Possibly Go Wrong?" Released: 29 January 2026; 3. "Undefeated Champion" Released: 13 March 2026; 4. "Attitude" Released: 10 April 2026

Sweat is the ninth studio album by the English singer Melanie C, released on 1 May 2026, through Red Girl Records in partnership with Virgin Music Group. It is supported by the release of the title track, "What Could Possibly Go Wrong?", "Undefeated Champion", and "Attitude". The album debuted at number three on the UK Albums Chart, becoming Melanie C's highest-charting solo album, and the highest-charting solo album by a member of the Spice Girls.

== Background and recording ==
Sweat comes six years following her self-titled album. Ahead of the release of the album, Melanie Chisholm leaned more explicitly into the "Sporty Spice" persona from her time in the Spice Girls. The identity had long been one she had once tried to complicate or outrun, reframing it through fitness, club culture, body acceptance, and self-possession. Announced in October 2025 alongside the title track, Sweat marked her first full-length project in six years and was promoted as a high-energy dance-pop album rooted in movement, joy, and physical release. In an interview with the Associated Press, Chisholm talked about how the review pertained to her renewed relationship with dance and house music. She described rave culture as a formative pre-Spice Girls influence that had been relegated due to the group's demanding schedule, but later reemerged through her work as a DJ. According to Chisholm, that return to club spaces informed Sweat's sense of communal release and "dance floor therapy", with the album embracing pop, nu-disco, house, and workout-ready electropop production.

Recording for Sweat began in late 2023 and concluded in early 2026. The album was recorded across multiple international sessions, with material in the album recorded in London, Stockholm, Los Angeles, and Sydney. Produced by Swedish producer, Klas Åhlund, the goal of the album was emphasise immediacy and momentum. According to Chisholm, the recording process was focused on her post-2010s evolution as a DJ. After years of performing in club settings, she approached the album less as a traditional pop comeback than as an attempt to translate the feeling of a live dance set into a studio record. The Associated Press described the project as channeling her pre-Spice Girls rave roots, while she framed the album around joy, release, and the physical connection between music and the body.

== Release and promotion ==
To promote the album, Chisholm entered into a partnership deal with Virgin Music Group. She described the partnership as a homecoming and praised the distributor for their "artist-led deals".

It was quickly noted that the vinyl issues of the album contained a spelling error on the spine; instead of Melanie C the vinyl spines say Melanine C. Fans speculated this was done on purpose as it is the artist's ninth studio album, however, Chisholm denied this was the case.

=== Live performance ===
On 13 March, Chisholm announced her 2026 world tour.

=== Singles ===
Title track "Sweat" was released as the first single on 17 October 2025. It entered the UK Singles Download Chart at number 10, spending six weeks on that chart. "Sweat" also peaked at number 22 in Australia on the ARIA Digital Track Chart. The second single "What Could Possibly Go Wrong?" was released on 29 January 2026. It debuted at number 40 on the UK Singles Downloads Chart. "Undefeated Champion" was released as the third single on 13 March. On 10 April 2026, "Attitude" was released as the album's fourth single. debuted at number 99 on the Official UK Singles Downloads Chart. "Drum Machine" was released as a promotional single with a music video alongside the album's release.

== Critical reception ==
Professional ratings
Aggregate scores
Source	Rating
Metacritic	84/100
Review scores
Source	Rating
AllMusic	4/5 stars
The Arts Desk	4/5 stars
AU Review	4/5 stars
MusicOMH	3.5/5 stars
PopMatters	9/10
Sputnikmusic	3.7/5

Sweat received universal acclaim upon release from music critics. Chris Rutherford from PopMatters called the album a "brilliant club-ready mixtape," praising Melanie C’s delivery of "uncomplicated pop music, optimized for both the dancefloor and the gym floor" while reconnecting with her dance roots. He viewed the record as a personal breakthrough, noting that Melanie C "was only ever waging war upon herself," and described the album as a statement of confidence and liberation. Writing for The Arts Desk , Kathryn Reilly described Sweat as "proper pop music," commending its creation of a "joyful record at a dark time" through catchy, polished dance tracks. She highlighted its pop and house influences, calling it "highly uplifting dance fare" that "could actually spice up your life."

AllMusic editor Neil Z. Yeung called Sweat "one of the most cohesive, fun, and authentic releases" in Melanie C's catalog, praising its "pure euphoria" and seamless blend of house and disco influences. He concluded that the album ranked among her best, describing it as "an escapist comfort" packed with "potential hits where everything's a highlight and nothing needs to be skipped." Sam Shepherd from MusicOMH characterized Sweat as a "determined pop album" that "doesn't demand much input from above the shoulders, but insists everything below is in motion,” highlighting its emphasis on energetic, dance-driven production over lyrical complexity. The Times offered a more restrained assessment, calling it an "unremarkable but perfectly likeable album of upbeat [...] pneumatic dance music that blasts from gyms."

== Commercial performance ==
In the United Kingdom, Sweat debuted at number three on the UK Albums Chart and at number two on the UK Independent Albums chart, selling 19,483 album-equivalent units in the first week. It became the singer's highest charting album of her career, as well as her fourth top-ten album, following Northern Star (1999), Reason (2003), and Melanie C (2020), which peaked at numbers four, five, and eight, respectively. Elsewhere, in Australia, the album became her first solo album to reach the top-ten, debuting at number five on the ARIA Albums Chart.

== Track listing ==
Standard track listing
No.	Title	Writer(s)	Producer(s)	Length
1.	"Sweat"	Paul Jabara; Diana Ross; Raymond L. Chew; Sean McDonagh; Dominc Liu; Theo Hutchcraft; Melanie Chisholm	Kingdoms	3:02
2.	"Drum Machine"	Chisholm; Jonathan Shave; Sam Harper	Jon Shave	3:16
3.	"What Could Possibly Go Wrong?"	Chisholm; Klas Åhlund; Linnea Södahl	Åhlund	3:27
4.	"Til it Breaks"	Chisholm; Violet Skies; Adam Novodor	Novodor	2:34
5.	"Pressure"	Chisholm; Hutchcraft; James Greenwood	Ghostculture	4:20
6.	"Emotional Memory"	Chisholm; Oscar Scheller	Scheller	3:14
7.	"Attitude"	Chisholm; Scheller; Leroy Burgess; Andrew Davenport; Clementine Douglas	Alex Metric	3:13
8.	"Good for Nothing"	Chisholm; Scheller	Scheller	3:09
9.	"Undefeated Champion"	Chisholm; Glen Joseph Roberts; Luis Navidad	Navidad	3:34
10.	"Cashmere"	Chisholm; Åhlund; Södahl	Åhlund	2:50
11.	"Free to Love"	Chisholm; Skies; Annika Wells; Novodor	Novodor	2:25
12.	"One Track Mind"	Chisholm; Sam de Jong; Michael Matosic	de Jong	2:56
13.	"Flick of the Wrist"	Chisholm; Rosie May Hudson-Edmonds; Anna-Catherine Hartley; Caroline Sans	Sur Back	3:23
Total length:				41:23

Deluxe digital track listing
No.	Title	Writer(s)	Producer(s)	Length
14.	"Healing" (demo)			2:52
15.	"We're Beautiful" (demo)			3:11
16.	"Sweat" (Guz remix)	Jabara; Ross; Chew; McDonagh; Liu; Hutchcraft; Chisholm	Kingdoms; Guz^{[r]}	3:04
Total length:				50:53

=== Notes ===
- ^{^[r]} denotes a remixer.
- "Sweat" contains an interpolation of "Work That Body" (1982), written by Diana Ross, Ray Chew, and Paul Jabara, and performed by Ross.
- "Attitude" contains a sample of "Moment Of My Life" (1982), written by Leroy Burgess and Andrew Davenport, and performed by Inner Life.
- A second digital deluxe edition was released, which includes instrumentals of each track from the standard track listing, along with behind-the-scenes footage from the music videos for "Sweat" and "Drum Machine".

== Personnel ==
The credits are adapted from Tidal.

=== Musicians ===
- Melanie Chisholm – vocals (all tracks)
- Dominic Liu – keyboards (track 1); programming (track 1)
- Sean McDonagh – keyboards (track 1); programming (track 1)
- Samantha Harris – background vocals (track 2)
- Jon Shave – keyboards (track 2); programming (track 2)
- Frans Bryngel – keyboards (tracks 3, 10); programming (tracks 3, 10)
- Klas Åhlund – keyboards (tracks 3, 10); programming (tracks 3, 10)
- Adam Novodor – keyboards (tracks 4, 11); programming (tracks 4, 11)
- James Greenwood – keyboards (track 5); programming (track 5)
- Oscar Scheller – keyboards (tracks 6, 8); programming (track 6, 8)
- Alex Metric – keyboards (track 7); programming (track 7)
- Glen Joseph Roberts – background vocals (track 9); keyboards (track 9); percussion (track 9)
- Luis Navidad – keyboards (track 9); programming (track 9)
- Sam de Jong – bass (track 12); drums (track 12); guitar (track 12); keyboards (track 12); programming (track 12)
- Caroline Sans – keyboards (track 13); programming (track 13)

=== Technical ===
- Dan Grech – mastering; mixing (all tracks)
- Dominic Liu – recording (track 1)
- Jon Shave – recording (track 2)
- Klas Åhlund – recording (tracks 3, 10)
- Novodor – recording (tracks 4, 11)
- Ghostmachine – recording (track 5)
- Oscar Scheller – recording (tracks 6, 8)
- Alex Metric – recording (track 7)
- Luis Navidad – recording (track 9)
- Sam de Jong – recording (track 12)
- Sur Back – recording (track 13)

== Charts ==
Chart performance
Chart (2026)	Peak position
Australian Albums (ARIA)	5
Austrian Albums (Ö3 Austria)	44
Belgian Albums (Ultratop Flanders)	41
Belgian Albums (Ultratop Wallonia)	12
French Physical Albums (SNEP)	64
German Albums (Offizielle Top 100)	52
Irish Independent Albums (IRMA)	13
Italian Physical Albums (FIMI)	10
Scottish Albums (Official Charts)	2
Spanish Albums (PROMUSICAE)	21
Swiss Albums (Schweizer Hitparade)	25
UK Albums (Official Charts)	3
UK Independent Albums (Official Charts)	2

== Release history ==
Release history
Date	Format	Edition	Label	Ref.
1 May 2026	Cassette; CD; music download; music streaming; LP	Standard	Red Girl; Virgin Music	
1 May 2026	Music download	Digital deluxe	Red Girl; Virgin Music	
1 May 2026	Music download	Digital deluxe II	Red Girl; Virgin Music	
