= On the Horizon (Melanie C song) =

2003 single by Melanie C

Single by Melanie C

from the album Reason
- B-side: "I Love You Without Trying"; "Wonderland"
- Released: 2 June 2003
- Studio: Various
- Length: 3:36
- Label: Virgin
- Songwriters: Gregg Alexander; Melanie Chisholm; Rick Nowels
- Producers: Gregg Alexander; Rick Nowels

Melanie C singles chronology
"Here It Comes Again" (2003)	"On the Horizon" (2003)	"Melt" / "Yeh Yeh Yeh" (2003)

Music video
- "On the Horizon" on YouTube

"On the Horizon" is a song released by British singer-songwriter Melanie C. It was written by her along with Rick Nowels, Gregg Alexander, and produced by Nowels and Alexander for her second studio album, Reason (2003). Selected as the album's second single, the song reached number 14 on the UK Singles Chart. Melanie C performed the song during the Reason Tour.

== Music video ==
The music video for "On the Horizon" was directed by Howard Greenhalgh and filmed in and around Benalmadena, in Southern Spain on 9–10 April 2003. Melanie C is in Spain driving around to find duplicated images of herself that are frozen in various scenes. When she finds them, Melanie gets inside of them in order to give the scenes movement. The duplicated Melanies are at a Car Wash, playing basketball, and jumping into the water with a man. At the end of the video, Melanie and her duplicated image leave together in the car.

== Track listings ==
- UK CD single
1. "On the Horizon" (radio mix) – 3:36
2. "I Love You Without Trying" – 4:10
- UK DVD single
1. "On the Horizon" (video)
2. "Never Be the Same Again" (acoustic version)
3. "Wonderland"
4. Behind the scenes at video shoot
- European CD single
1. "On the Horizon" (radio mix) – 3:36
2. "I Love You Without Trying" – 4:10
3. "Goin' Down" (live acoustic version) – 3:39

== Credits and personnel ==
Credits are lifted from the Reason album booklet.

Studios

- Recorded at various studios in Los Angeles and London
- Mixed at O'Henry Sound Studios, 1808, Sound Gallery Studios (Los Angeles), and Mayfair Studios (London, England)
- Mastered at Metropolis Mastering (London, England)

Personnel

- Gregg Alexander – writing, production
- Melanie C – writing
- Rick Nowels – writing, backing vocals, acoustic guitars, acoustic piano, Fender Rhodes, Wurlitzer, Mellotron, Korg Trinity, horn arrangement, production
- Chris Garcia – backing vocals, chink guitar, bass, various percussion, engineering
- Rusty Anderson – electric guitars
- Charlie Judge – keyboards
- Curt Bisquera – drums
- Wayne Rodrigues – drum programming, Pro Tools editing
- Jerry Hey – trumpet, horn arrangement
- Brandon Fields – trumpet, saxophone
- Bill Reichenbach Jr. – saxophone, horn arrangement
- James Sanger – programming
- Jon Ingoldsby – mixing
- Alan Veucasovic – engineering
- Kirstin Johnson – LA project coordination
- Tim Young – mastering

== Charts ==
=== Weekly charts ===
Chart (2003)	Peak position
Belgium (Ultratip Bubbling Under Flanders)	5
Belgium (Ultratip Bubbling Under Wallonia)	16
Europe (Eurochart Hot 100)	46
Germany (GfK)	80
Hungary (Editors' Choice Top 40)	21
Ireland (IRMA)	34
Italy (FIMI)	45
Netherlands (Dutch Top 40)	16
Netherlands (Single Top 100)	54
Romania (Romanian Top 100)	17
Scottish Singles Sales (Official Charts)	12
UK Singles (Official Charts)	14

=== Year-end charts ===
Chart (2003)	Position
Brazil (Crowley)	88

== Release history ==
Region	Date	Format	Label	ID	Ref.
United Kingdom	2 June 2003	CD	Virgin	VSCDT1851	
United Kingdom	2 June 2003	DVD	Virgin	VSDVD1851	
