= Yeh Yeh Yeh =

2003 song by Melanie C

Single by Melanie C

from the album Reason
- A-side: "Melt" (UK double A-side)
- B-side: "Knocked Out"; "I Wish"
- Released: 10 November 2003
- Length: 3:43
- Label: Virgin
- Songwriters: Rhett Lawrence; Melanie Chisholm
- Producer: Rhett Lawrence

Melanie C singles chronology
"On the Horizon" (2003)	"Yeh Yeh Yeh" / "Melt" (2003)	"Next Best Superstar" (2005)

Audio sample
- file; help

Music video
- "Yeh Yeh Yeh" on YouTube

"Yeh Yeh Yeh" is a song by British singer-songwriter Melanie C. It was the third and final single from Chisolm's second solo album, Reason (2003). The song was released as a double A-side with "Melt" in the United Kingdom. In the rest of Europe, "Yeh Yeh Yeh" was released alone as the final single. The song was also sampled for a remix of the song "Tanha Dil" by Indian singer, Shaan.

== Background and release ==
Alongside "Melt", "Yeh Yeh Yeh" was a last-minute addition for the track listing for Reason. Originally, the plan was to release "Yeh Yeh Yeh" as the third single on 22 September 2003, but shortly before this could happen, Chisholm injured her knee in TV show The Games during a judo match with Azra Akın. Because Chisholm was limited in movement, she could not fully promote an upbeat song with an injury, causing the original release date to get pushed back. Nevertheless she performed the song with her injured knee in a limited manner. "Melt", being an easier song to promote with an injury, was added to the mix, resulting in the double single.

The single was released on 10 November 2003, but there were numerous problems. On most CD1s of the set, the track listing was accidentally swapped so that "Yeh Yeh Yeh" was the first track on the CD. Because of this misprint, and following strong competition, lack of proper promotion, and distribution problems, the single entered the UK Singles Chart at number twenty-seven, sealing Chisholm's fate with Virgin Records and further hindering any hope for the album's success. The single sold just 8,313 copies in the UK but peaked at number 13 in Spain.

== Music video ==
The accompanying music video was directed by Ray Kay, and filmed in a giant studio on 26–27 June 2003 in Oslo, Norway. The video appears to draw influences from the video of Chisholm's previous single "Goin' Down" as it takes place in a giant warehouse styled as a club. The video opens with Melanie waking up in a large crowd filled with people passed out on the floor. As she arises and starts performing with her band, everyone wakes up and begins dancing and jumping intensely. There are also scenes of skaters performing the half-pipe structure and various people dancing in a big cage. Behind the scenes footage was also shown on Top of the Pops Saturday where Melanie was shown re-creating the music video with a much lower budget.

== Formats and track listings ==
These are the formats and track listings of major single releases of "Yeh Yeh Yeh".

UK CD

1. "Melt" (album version) – 3:44
2. "Yeh Yeh Yeh" (radio mix) – 3:43

UK CD2

1. "Melt" (album version) – 3:44
2. "Yeh Yeh Yeh" (radio mix) – 3:43
3. "Knocked Out" – 3:50
4. "Yeh Yeh Yeh" (music video) – 3:40

European CD

1. "Yeh Yeh Yeh" (radio mix) – 3:43
2. "Knocked Out" – 3:50
3. "Yeh Yeh Yeh" (Shanghai Surprise remix) – 7:34

European DVD

1. "Yeh Yeh Yeh" (music video) – 3:43
2. "Knocked Out" – 3:50
3. "I Wish" (live from Re:covered) – 4:24
4. Behind the Scenes – 2:00

Official versions

- "Yeh Yeh Yeh" (album version) – 4:19
- "Yeh Yeh Yeh" (radio mix) – 3:43
- "Yeh Yeh Yeh" (Shanghai Surprise Remix) – 7:34
- "Yeh Yeh Yeh" (Shanghai Surprise Remix Edit) – 3:51
- "Yeh Yeh Yeh" (Shanghai Surprise Dub) – 6:35

== Live performances ==
Melanie C performed the song on the following concert tours and TV shows:

- Reason Tour
- Top of the Pops Saturday
- The Barfly Mini-Tour
- Beautiful Intentions Tour
- Live Hits
- This Time Canadian Tour
- The Sea – Live

== Charts ==
Weekly chart performance for "Yeh Yeh Yeh"
Chart (2003)	Peak position
Germany (GfK)	63
Hungary (Editors' Choice Top 40)	21
Italy (FIMI)	38
Romania (Romanian Top 100)	14
Scottish Singles Sales (Official Charts)	33
Spain (Promusicae)	13
UK Singles (Official Charts)	27
