= Melanie C (album) =

2020 album by Melanie C

Studio album by Melanie C
- Released: 2 October 2020
- Recorded: 2019–2020
- Genres: Electronic; pop
- Length: 35:03
- Label: Red Girl Media
- Producers: Billen Ted; Fryars; Future Cut; Alex Metric; Paul O'Duffy; One Bit; George Reid; Biff Stannard; Ten Ven

Melanie C chronology
Version of Me (2016)	Melanie C (2020)	Sweat (2026)

Singles from Melanie C
- 1. "Who I Am" Released: 13 March 2020; 2. "Blame It on Me" Released: 27 May 2020; 3. "In and Out of Love" Released: 29 July 2020; 4. "Fearless" Released: 16 September 2020; 5. "Into You" Released: 1 December 2020

Melanie C is the eighth studio album by the English singer Melanie C. It was released on 2 October 2020 by Red Girl Media. The album debuted at number eight on the UK Albums Chart, becoming Melanie C's highest-charting album since Reason (2003). Melanie C was preceded by the singles "Who I Am", "Blame It on Me", "In and Out of Love" and "Fearless", the latter of which features rapper Nadia Rose. On 3 September 2021, a digital deluxe version of the album was released.

== Background ==
Melanie Chisholm (Melanie C) started recording the album in 2019 after being inspired by her reunion with the Spice Girls and their Spice World – 2019 Tour after the year "felt like a real celebration". She said the experience had "actually been quite inspiring for this album" as she "reflected" during her time on stage. Chisholm teamed up with drag collective Sink the Pink to release the single "High Heels" and embark on a world tour of LGBTQ Pride events. Although the single does not feature on Melanie C, it launched a new sound for the singer, with her embarking on a new dance-based route rather than her previous alternative pop recordings. Chisholm elaborated on her inspiration for the album: "I had this song going into the Spice shows where I was nervous about being Sporty again. But singing those songs in rehearsals I realised I am here, she is within me. It made me reflect on my life and inform this album. I wanted to make an album that really acknowledged that. I felt it was time to embrace everything about myself, Melanie, Sporty, girlfriend, cleaner, cook, therapist. And I wanted it to be empowering and fun [...] This [album] is different because I have massive new changes behind the scenes, new management. Not many people survived the cull. Importantly new A&R, and I was introduced to lots of new artists, songwriters and producers, it really feels like a new chapter."

On 3 August 2020, Chisholm told BBC Music: "Obviously, I'm making a pop-dance record and I'm a mature artist, so I have to accept that some radio stations are not going to be playing me anymore. That's something to overcome. But I want people to enjoy this album, I want people to dance to it, I want people to be empowered by it. And when coronavirus has done one, I want to get out there and perform it live." Speaking with Vogue, Chisholm spoke on the album's sound and her own self-confidence, stating: "I think some of it comes with age. Being at this point in my life, and being a mum, all of these are little steps that help build your confidence. The Spice Girls tour last year was hugely influential for this record, and beyond that, I also did a world Pride tour; we started in San Paolo and we ended in Australia. [...] I spent a lot of my youth feeling like I wasn’t enough, or I wasn’t worthy, or having guilt attached to my success with the girls. But all these experiences made me really appreciate it for the first time."

== Promotion ==
=== Live performances and tour ===
On 1 October 2020, Chisholm performed a virtual event, Colour & Light. During the event, she performed songs from the album, as well as previewed her live show. The following day, she appeared on BBC Radio 2, where she performed "In and Out of Love," as well as the Spice Girls' "Too Much". Chisholm is also set to embark on a tour to support the album. The twenty-date tour will is scheduled to begin 28 April 2021 and conclude on 25 May 2021, visiting cities across Europe and the United Kingdom. In November 2021, due to rising concerns over the COVID-19 pandemic in Europe, Chisholm announced the cancellation of European tour dates.

In February 2022, the United Kingdom leg of the tour began in Glasgow. Reviews for the tour from The Guardian and The Times both giving the show 4/5 stars.

=== Singles ===
On 19 March 2020, Chisholm released the album's first single, "Who I Am", which saw her exploring self-compassion she had lost during her time in the spotlight. The music video was directed by Sylvie Weber. Chisholm said of the inspiration for the single, "I've talked quite openly about mental health issues I've suffered with. I've had depression over the years and when I was younger I suffered from an eating disorder. So I think when you just finally allow yourself to be proud of some of the difficulties you've overcome then you can kind of find that place to start liking yourself a bit more." Melanie performed the song on The Late Late Show with James Corden and recorded a second music video showing her at home during the pandemic. "Who I Am" did not enter the Official UK Top 100 Chart, but debuted and peaked at number 27 on the Official Singles Sales Chart Top 100 in its second week of release. The physical 2CD deluxe bonus track Joe Goddard remix was released on 1 April 2020.

The album's second single, "Blame It on Me", was released two months later on 27 May 2020, with the theme of the song "calling out toxicity in a relationship." The music video was directed by Sylvie Weber. Whilst promoting the single on Sunday Brunch, Chisholm stated "Because I was nervous about becoming Sporty Spice again, but I realised quickly I don't become her, I am her. It's a huge part of who I am. That's when I just started to embrace everything about myself. This album is really empowering and I have the Spice Girls to thank for feeling that way about myself and everything we achieved." "Blame It on Me" did not enter the Official UK Top 100 Chart, but debuted and peaked at number 66 on the Official Singles Sales Chart Top 100.

To coincide with the album's announcement and pre-order, on 29 July 2020, Chisholm released the album's third single, "In and Out of Love" and premiered the track on BBC Radio 2's The Zoe Ball Breakfast Show on the same day. The choreography-heavy music video was directed by Graham Cruz and filmed, socially distanced, at Alexandra Palace. The video features Chisholm's backing dancers from the Spice World 2019 Tour. Chisholm said ahead of the single's release: "It’s so brilliant to release a pure pop, upbeat, positive fun tune. I think it’s exactly what the world needs right now!" "In and Out of Love" did not enter the Official UK Top 100 Chart, but debuted and peaked at number 97 on the Official Singles Downloads Chart Top 100 one week after the album's release. "Fearless" was released as the album's fourth single on 16 September 2020. "Into You" was released as the album's fifth single on 1 December 2020. The video, directed by Graham Cruz, was released on 7 January 2021.

Three days before the album release, "Overload" was released as a promotional single. A lyric video for "Overload" was released on 5 November 2020. On 20 November, Chisholm released remixes for "Overload" by Karim Naas.

== Critical reception ==
Professional ratings
Aggregate scores
Source	Rating
AnyDecentMusic?	6.9/10
Metacritic	76/100
Review scores
Source	Rating
Albumism	4.5/5 stars
AllMusic	4.5/5 stars
Clash	6/10
Evening Standard	4/5 stars
The Independent	3/5 stars
Metro	4/5 stars
MusicOMH	3.5/5 stars
NME	3/5 stars
The Observer	4/5 stars
PopMatters	8/10

Melanie C received generally favourable reviews from music critics. At Metacritic, which assigns a normalised rating out of 100 to reviews from professional critics, the album received a weighted average score of 76, based on eight reviews. Album of the Year collected ten reviews and calculated an average of 73 out of 100. Aggregator AnyDecentMusic? gave the album a 6.9 out of ten, based on their assessment of the critical consensus.

Quentin Harrison of Albumism cited the album as unique, complimenting its "sense of its creator's personal freedom that suffuses its song stock—this makes the long player a singular body of work within her growing catalog." Neil Z. Yeung of AllMusic gave the album a four-and-a-half-out-of-five rating and called it a "declarative" album. They added: "It's a wonder how it took this long for her to make such an unabashed pop album and, with the addition of her emotional insight, her catalog is all the better for it." David Smyth of Evening Standard gave the album four-out-of-five rating, calling it "fresh and energetic," and complimented Chisholm's use of "contemporary electronic styles without sounding like she’s trying too hard for renewed relevance." Smyth further complimented Chisholm for sounding "confident and empowered." In a positive review from Metro, Caroline Sullivan was enthusiastic of the album, stating: "If this is the singer's strongest record by some way, it's because she's found the sweet spot between her pop-rock comfort zone and hard club sounds."

Furthering the positive reviews, Ross Horton of MusicOMH concluded their review, by stating: "Melanie C (the album) is full of great moments that combine to make the one of the strongest albums released by Melanie C (the person) since 1996." Laura Snapes of The Observer complimented Chisholm, stating: "Melanie C honours those fans – and herself – as adults worthy of hearing themselves in vital pop." Writing for PopMatters, Jeffrey Davies complimented the album as an "electro/disco-infused pop album that does what good pop does best: celebrate our weaknesses, acknowledge our scars, and dance some of the pain away."

In a mixed review, British journalism website The Arts Desk gave the album a three-out-of-five rating. Editor Joe Muggs concluded: "There's a lot to like here, but a few spoonfuls less sugar and it could have been a significantly bigger achievement." Clash noted Chisholm's ability to make songs with songs "that seek to balance resilience with the vulnerabilities," while noting we would also be "looking at an even better record had it allowed the space required for her often unrecognised jaw-on-the-floor vocals." Helen Brown of The Independent also gave the album a mixed review writing that it was Chisholm's "best solo record to date," while citing her lack of "originality and super-wattage of a solo megastar." NME editor Rhian Daly wrote in their review that the album "serves as its creator’s best work in decades," but has "misfires here and there." Simon K. of Sputnikmusic gave a mixed review calling the album "good ol' fun," while citing Chisholm's ability to get "a little too caught up in the contemporary impetus" of musical acts, such as Dua Lipa and Justin Bieber.

== Commercial performance ==
Melanie C debuted at number eight on the UK Albums Chart, with sales of 7,265 combined units; becoming Chisholm's highest-charting album since Reason (2003). The album further debuted at number one on the UK Independent Albums chart, appeared on the Australian ARIA Album Chart, her first to do so since Reason (2003).

== Track listing ==
Track listing adapted from Apple Music. Credits adapted from Spotify metadata. Deluxe edition credits adapted from album liner notes and Spotify metadata.

Melanie C track listing
No.	Title	Writer(s)	Producer(s)	Length
1.	"Who I Am"	Ash Howes; Biff Stannard; Bryn Christopher; Melanie Chisholm	Ten Ven	3:32
2.	"Blame It on Me"	Chisholm; Niamh Murphy; Samuel Brennan; Tom Hollings	Billen Ted	3:08
3.	"Good Enough"	Aleksandra Denton; Darren Emilio Lewis; Iyiola Babatunde Babalola; Chisholm	Billen Ted	3:36
4.	"Escape"	Lewis; Babalola; Chisholm; Poppy Bascombe	Future Cut	3:10
5.	"Overload"	George Reid; Jonny Lattimer; Chisholm	Reid	3:18
6.	"Fearless" (featuring Nadia Rose)	Chisholm; Rose; Paul O'Duffy	O'Duffy	4:07
7.	"Here I Am"	Chisholm; Bascombe; Tom Neville	Ten Ven	3:28
8.	"Nowhere to Run"	Howes; Stannard; Chisholm	Stannard	3:34
9.	"In and Out of Love"	Stannard; Jonathan Howard; Joseph Murphy; Chisholm	One Bit	3:14
10.	"End of Everything"	Chisholm; Sacha Skarbek	Future Cut	3:56
Total length:				35:03

Melanie C physical deluxe disc two
No.	Title	Writer(s)	Producer(s)	Length
1.	"Self Love"	Chisholm; Neville; Bascombe	Billen Ted	3:36
2.	"Into You"	Chisholm; N. Murphy; Brennan; Hollings	Billen Ted	2:42
3.	"Touch Me"	Cassandra Fox; Gary Kemp; Rui da Silva	Billen Ted	4:02
4.	"Who I Am" (Joe Goddard remix)	Howes; Stannard; Christopher; Chisholm	Ten Ven	6:25
5.	"Blame It on Me" (PBH & Jack remix)	Chisholm; N. Murphy; Brennan; Hollings	Billen Ted	3:37
6.	"High Heels" (featuring Sink the Pink) (Moto Blanco remix)	Benjamin Garrett; Chisholm; Rae Morris	Alex Metric; Fryars	3:48
Total length:				23:21

Melanie C digital deluxe bonus tracks
No.	Title	Writer(s)	Producer(s)	Length
11.	"Into You"	Chisholm; N. Murphy; Brennan; Hollings	Billen Ted	2:42
12.	"Touch Me"	Fox; Kemp; da Silva	Billen Ted	4:02
Total length:				35:03

Melanie C digital deluxe disc two
No.	Title	Writer(s)	Producer(s)	Length
1.	"Who I Am" (acoustic)	Howes; Stannard; Christopher; Chisholm	Ricci Riccardi	3:18
2.	"Blame It on Me" (acoustic)	Chisholm; N. Murphy; Brennan; Hollings	Riccardi	3:11
3.	"In and Out of Love" (acoustic)	Stannard; Howard; J. Murphy; Chisholm	Riccardi	3:16
4.	"Into You" (acoustic)	Chisholm; N. Murphy; Brennan; Hollings	Riccardi	3:10
5.	"I Turn to You" (acoustic)	Chisholm; Rick Nowels; Billy Steinberg	Riccardi	4:16
6.	"Never Be the Same Again" (acoustic)	Chisholm; Rhett Lawrence; Paul F Cruz; Lisa Lopes; Lorenzo Martin	Riccardi	3:25
7.	"Too Much" (acoustic)	Spice Girls; Andy Watkins; Paul Wilson	Riccardi	3:44
Total length:				23:21

Melanie C digital deluxe disc three
No.	Title	Writer(s)	Producer(s)	Length
1.	"Who I Am" (Joe Goddard remix edit)	Howes; Stannard; Christopher; Chisholm	Ten Ven	3:44
2.	"Blame It on Me" (PBH & Jack remix edit)	Chisholm; N. Murphy; Brennan; Hollings	Billen Ted	2:47
3.	"Overload" (Todd Terry remix)	Reid; Lattimer; Chisholm	Todd Terry	2:53
4.	"In and Out of Love" (Nick Reach Up remix)	Stannard; Howard; J. Murphy; Chisholm	Nick Halkes	3:44
5.	"Overload" (Karim Naas remix)	Reid; Lattimer; Chisholm	Karim Naas	3:25
Total length:				23:21

== Charts ==
Chart performance for Melanie C
Chart (2020)	Peak position
Australian Albums (ARIA)	37
Belgian Albums (Ultratop Flanders)	132
Belgian Albums (Ultratop Wallonia)	181
German Albums (Offizielle Top 100)	27
Irish Albums (IRMA)	80
Irish Independent Albums (IRMA)	6
Scottish Albums (Official Charts)	9
Spanish Albums (PROMUSICAE)	89
Swiss Albums (Schweizer Hitparade)	50
UK Albums (Official Charts)	8
UK Independent Albums (Official Charts)	1
US Top Album Sales (Billboard)	98

== Release history ==
Release dates and formats for Melanie C
Region	Date	Formats	Editions	Labels	Refs.
Various	2 October 2020	Cassette; CD; digital download; streaming; vinyl	Standard	Red Girl Media	
Various	2 October 2020	Box set; CD; vinyl	Deluxe	Red Girl Media	
Various	3 September 2021	Digital download; streaming	Digital deluxe	Red Girl Media	
