= Reason (Melanie C album) =

2003 album by Melanie C

Studio album by Melanie C
- Released: 10 March 2003
- Recorded: November 2001 – December 2002
- Studios: O'Henry Sound Studios (Burbank, California, USA); 1808, ESP Music & Sound and Sound Gallery Studios (Los Angeles, California, USA); Cello Studios (Hollywood, California, USA); Strongroom, Area 21, Metropolis Studios, Sphere Studios, Angel Recording Studios, Roundhouse Studios, Mayfair Studios and Crashpad (London, UK)
- Genre: Pop
- Length: 48:28
- Label: Virgin
- Producers: Gregg Alexander; Guy Chambers; Gary Clark; Richard Flack; Julian Gallagher; Tore Johansson; Eliot Kennedy; Rhett Lawrence; Damian LeGassick; Patrick McCarthy; Rick Nowels; Richard Stannard; Phil Thornalley; Peter-John Vettese; Marius De Vries

Melanie C chronology
Northern Star (1999)	Reason (2003)	Beautiful Intentions (2005)

Singles from Reason
- 1. "Here It Comes Again" Released: 24 February 2003; 2. "On the Horizon" Released: 2 June 2003; 3. "Let's Love" Released: 6 August 2003 (Japan only); 4. "Melt" / "Yeh, Yeh, Yeh" Released: 10 November 2003

Reason is the second studio album by the English singer Melanie C. It was released on 10 March 2003 by Virgin Records. A follow-up to her solo debut Northern Star (1999), she worked between 2001 and 2003 on material for the album. Taking her music further into the rock pop genre, Melanie C collaborated with both returning and new producers to record around 40 songs for Reason, including Marius De Vries, Peter-John Vettese, Gregg Alexander, Rick Nowels, Guy Chambers, and Rhett Lawrence.

The album received mixed to negative reviews, with critics often calling it overly polished, inconsistent, and lacking the energy or individuality of Melanie C’s debut. While some noted moments of strong songwriting and a more mature sound, many still found it bland and less inspired than her earlier work. Commercially, it debuted at number five in the United Kingdom but quickly fell down the charts and saw only moderate international success, performing best in Germany and Scotland while charting lower across much of Europe and in Australia. Despite this, it was eventually certified Gold in the UK.

The singles from Reason were less commercially successful than Melanie C's earlier hits, with the lead single "Here It Comes Again," standing as the album's only top ten entry. Follow-ups "On the Horizon" and "Melt"/"Yeh Yeh Yeh" charted lower, reaching the UK top 20 and top 30 respectively. After what Virgin Records considered disappointing sales, she was dropped from the label at the end of 2003, a decision she later described as something of a relief despite mixed emotions at the time. In 2025, Reason was released on vinyl for the first time as part of Record Store Day.

== Background ==
In 1999, while still a member of the Spice Girls, Chisholm released her solo debut album, Northern Star. It earned favorable reviews from music critics, and became an international commercial success, reaching number one in Sweden, the top ten across Europe, and selling over 2.5 million copies worldwide. The album produced five singles, including the UK number ones "Never Be the Same Again" and "I Turn to You," the latter earning a Grammy Award for its remix, and was promoted through live performances, a documentary, and a reissue featuring single mixes. After all members of the Spice Girls had released solo material, Chisholm was widely regarded as the only member to have maintained a consistently successful solo career. At this time, she was the only member of the Spice Girls to still have a contract with Virgin Records, since the rest of the Spice Girls had departed from Virgin as solo artists.

Chisholm had spent most of 2000 and 2001 touring around the world in promotion of Northern Star, and planned to enter the studio at the end of 2001 to start recording her next album. During this time, things for Chisholm proved to be difficult, as she was diagnosed with depression in 1999. She later revealed that it was difficult for her to handle the publicity and hard work during the Spice Girls days, and some days she would eat too little and exercise to the point of exhaustion. At the end of 1999, Chisholm's depression worsened and she spent days in bed, unable to cope with her day-to-day routine. After being diagnosed with depression she was prescribed antidepressants for 18 months, and also dealt with an eating disorder and a hostile media reaction questioning different topics from her weight to her sexuality.

== Recording ==
During the early stages of Reason's recording sessions in November 2001, Virgin Records executives were worried about the musical style of the album, as Chisholm's biggest hits from her debut album were an R&B single ("Never Be the Same Again") and a dance single ("I Turn to You"), and Chisholm had insisted that she wanted to keep making pop rock albums. According to The Sun, a record company source stated that "both Mel and Virgin have agreed that she should keep to the rock vibe that helped her 1999 album, Northern Star, do so well. But that is where their agreement ends". Chisholm had already stated that she wanted to work with new producers, while retaining some of the producers that had worked on her debut album.

The original release date for the album was set for October 2002 but it was delayed until March 2003, resulting in a number of articles in newspapers questioning her relationship with her record company, reporting that she was under pressure to lose weight. On an official statement published on her site, Chisholm stated that her relationship with Virgin was "fantastic", the recording sessions were going well and that she had not been forced to delay the release of the album or to lose weight. During the recording sessions for the album, a total of 40 songs were recorded. On 12 November 2002, the album title was revealed on her official site. For the album and single covers, Chishom and Virgin commissioned Sean Ellis as the official photographer.

In January 2003, Chisholm gave an official track-by-track review to the press, revealing the album's track list, which was quite different to the final track list. Chisholm stated that she was happy with having some of the Northern Star composers and producers on Reason as well as working with new ones, like David Arnold, Tore Johansson and Peter Vettese. The original album tracklist consisted of 11 songs, with "Melt" and "Yeh, Yeh, Yeh" added at the last minute, while "Wonderland" was later removed and issued as a B-side to the "On the Horizon" single. During the album sessions, Chisholm also recorded "Independence Day" for the soundtrack of the film Bend It Like Beckham, which was later included on the Japanese edition of Reason. Additionally, she wrote "Help Me Help You" for Holly Valance, featured on Valance’s debut album Footprints.

== Release and promotion ==
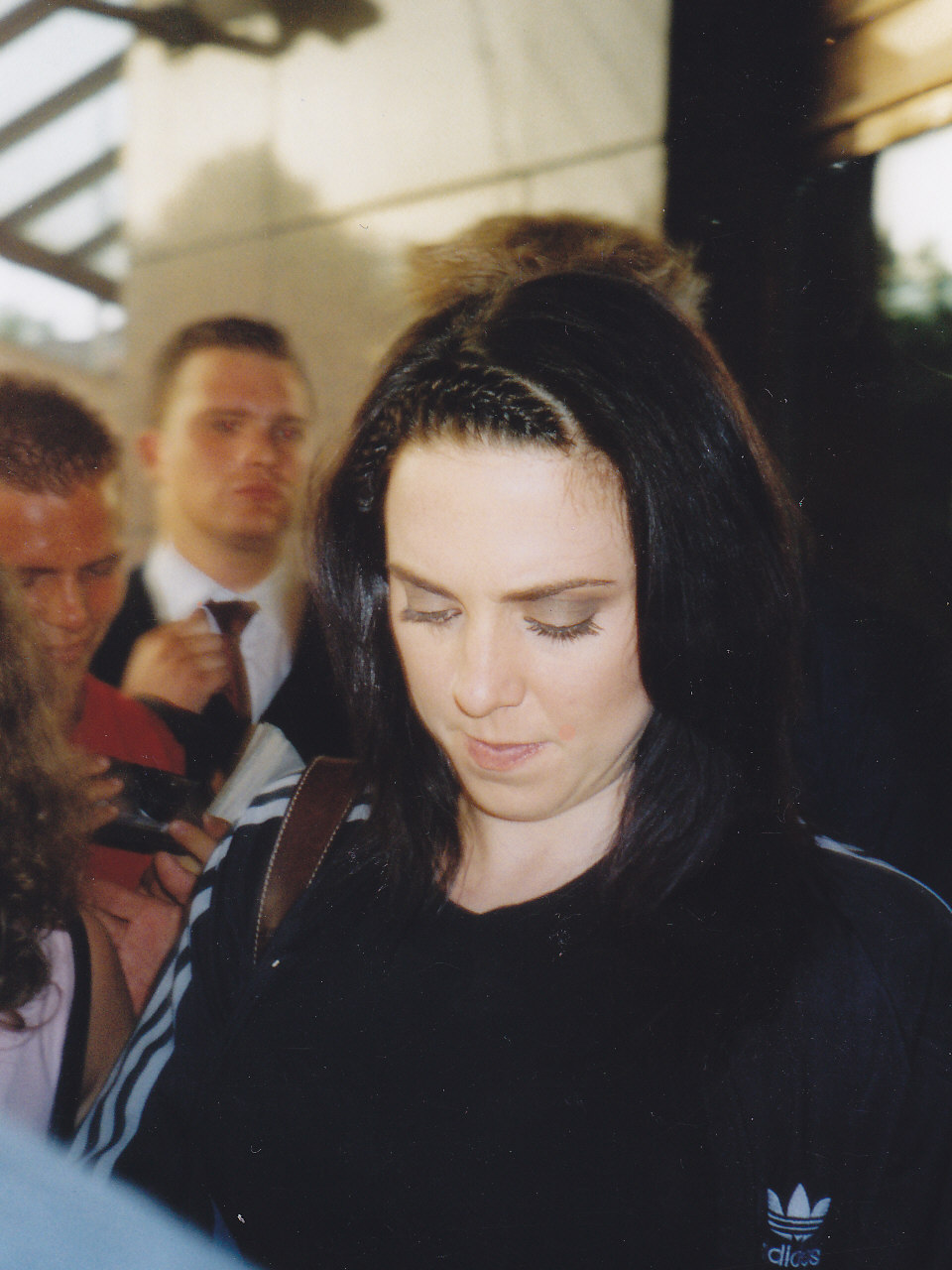
Melanie C in June 2003.

Reason was released on 10 March 2003 in the United Kingdom. Prior to the album's release Chisholm made appearances on TV shows including CD:UK and V Graham Norton, while she gave some interviews to magazines like the Times Magazine, Attitude and Marie Claire. She also performed a four-song set at HMV London. The set list included her past number-one singles "Never Be the Same Again" and "I Turn to You", as well as the first single from Reason, "Here It Comes Again", and the album track "Positively Somewhere." Promotion also included an exclusive webcast on 24 February 2003 performing four songs, which were the same as the HMV setlist, with the exception of "I Turn to You" being replaced by "Goin' Down". During the webcast Chisholm did a 30-minute interview, where she answered questions from fans from all over the world.

Chisholm embarked on the Reason Tour in order to promote the album, starting on 24 April 2003 and including 25 shows in Europe. In September 2003, Chisholm took part on The Games, a British reality sports game show that aired on Channel 4, in promotion of the album, where she was badly injured. Her injury changed the song that was selected to be the third single: "Yeh Yeh Yeh" was originally planned but after her injury, "Melt" was chosen to be launched along with "Yeh Yeh Yeh" as a double A-side, because she could do a small number of performances and "Melt" as a ballad, requiring minimum movement, was thought to be easier to promote. Her injury prevented her from fully promoting her last single and the album further.

== Critical reception ==
Professional ratings
Review scores
Source	Rating
AllMusic	2.5/5 stars
Drowned in Sound	3/10
The Guardian	2/5 stars
MTV Asia	6/10
Yahoo! Music UK	6/10

Reason received mixed to negative reviews from music critics. Alexis Kirke from MusicOMH described the album as failing to impress, calling it an "overly manufactured attempt at pop. Despite Melanie C's new image and press campaign, the album lacks the energy and individuality needed to escape the shadow of Planet Spice. Its more mature approach comes across as calculated rather than inspired, offering little to engage either new listeners or longtime fans." AllMusic gave the album two and a half stars out of five, with Stephen Thomas Erlewine stating that "[the songs] are colourless and characterless, sounding as if their main goal is to get on pop radio." He called the album "a real disappointment after the very good, very promising Northern Star." Lennat Mak from MTV Asia remarked that Reason was offering moments of infectious optimism and memorable rockier tracks but was undermined by inconsistent middle-of-the-road songs, ultimately making the album a disappointing follow-up to Northern Star.

Jamie Gill, writing for Yahoo! Music UK, called the album a "listless collection of half-written songs [that] sounds like the fat lady singing for the Spice Girls. Reason doesn't so much travel the middle of the road as stake itself out on it and beg an HGV to put it out of its misery. This is particularly disappointing given that Mel C's debut boasted a spiky personality and a clutch of bright, brilliant pop tunes."The Guardian gave Reason two out of five stars, with Alexis Petridis stating that the album "settles on a direction, sounds confident and efficient and wrings the last drops of originality out of Melanie C." Johnny Dee, writing for The Times, remarked that the songs on Reason "are often crushingly tedious (in spite of its title, the bombastic "Here It Comes Again" never even arrives); and dated (the sensual ballad "Soul Boy" is impardonably Lisa Stansfield-esque)." Drowned in Sound described the album as "just bland in the extreme. Mel doesn't have the vocal range to pull what she’s trying to do." In his retrospective review for Albumism, Quentin Harrison wrote: "The overarching feel of her second LP began embracing a brighter, tighter sound than the looser, magnetic truculence of Northern Star. Facing down her own personal demons and the presence of a then-budding relationship had a hand in shaping Reason. The songwriting, excellent throughout, is the biggest indicator of Melanie C's refreshed mindset."

== Commercial performance ==
Reason debuted at number five on the UK Albums Chart on the issue dated 22 March 2003. Sales began to decline in the second week, with the album falling to number 19, appearing on the chart for three more weeks before falling out. The release of the second single "On the Horizon" in June 2003 boosted the sales of the album, with the album reappearing on the UK Albums Chart for two weeks at number 81 and 99. Reason entered the chart for the last time on 17 January 2004, completing an eight-week appearance. Elsewhere, the album performed strongest in Germany and Scotland, where it peaked at number 13 on the German Albums Chart and number nine on the Scottish Albums Chart.

Although Reason was certified Gold in the United Kingdom, denoting shipments of 100,000 units, its underwhelming sales led Virgin Records to drop Melanie C at the end of 2003. In an interview with The Guardian in 2007, Chisholm said she had “mixed feelings" about being dropped following the poor sales of Reason, but acknowledged that she was "actually quite relieved” as she recognized Virgin Records "were starting to lose faith" in her. Two years later, she added that the album's songs "could have been stronger." In April 2025, Reason received its first vinyl release as part of that year's Record Store Day, which led to the album entering the UK Physical Albums Chart at number 99 on 18 April 2025.

== Track listing ==
Reason track listing
No.	Title	Writer(s)	Producer(s)	Length
1.	"Here It Comes Again"	Melanie Chisholm; Marius De Vries; Robert Howard	De Vries	4:17
2.	"Reason"	Chisholm; Peter-John Vettese	Vettese	4:20
3.	"Lose Myself in You"	Chisholm; Matte Rowe; Stefan Skarbek	Damian LeGassick	4:12
4.	"On the Horizon"	Chisholm; Gregg Alexander; Rick Nowels	Alexander; Nowels	3:36
5.	"Positively Somewhere"	Chisholm; Colin Campsie; Phil Thornalley	LeGassick	3:44
6.	"Melt"	Chisholm; Guy Chambers	Chambers; Richard Flack	3:44
7.	"Do I"	Chisholm; Dave Munday; Thornalley	Patrick McCarthy	3:34
8.	"Soul Boy"	Paul Buchanan	Gary Clark	4:27
9.	"Water"	Chisholm; Tore Johansson	McCarthy; Johansson	3:37
10.	"Home"	Chisholm; David Arnold	LeGassick	4:38
11.	"Let's Love"	Chisholm; Munday; Thornalley	Thornalley; McCarthy	3:23
12.	"Yeh Yeh Yeh"	Chisholm; Rhett Lawrence	Lawrence	4:20
Total length:				48:28

Japanese bonus tracks
No.	Title	Writer(s)	Producer(s)	Length
13.	"Independence Day"	Chisholm; Eliot Kennedy	Kennedy	4:20
14.	"Love to You"	Chisholm; Clark	Clark	4:36

2025 Vinyl Reissue bonus tracks
No.	Title	Writer(s)	Producer(s)	Length
13.	"Independence Day"	Chisholm; Kennedy	Kennedy	4:20
14.	"Like That"	Chisholm; Clark	Clark	4:36
15.	"Living Without You"	Chisholm; Julian Gallagher; Simon Hale; Richard Stannard	Gallagher; Stannard	4:06
16.	"I Love You Without Trying"	Chisholm; Nowels	Nowels	4:10
17.	"Never Be the Same Again" (Live Acoustic Version)	Chisholm; Rhett Lawrence; Paul F. Cruz; Lisa Lopes; Lorenzo Martin		4:07
18.	"Wonderland"	Chisholm; Martin Slattery; Scott Shields	De Vries	6:07
19.	"Goin' Down" (Live Acoustic Version)	Chisholm; Gallagher; Stannard		3:35
20.	"Love to You"	Chisholm; Clark	Clark	4:36
21.	"Knocked Out"	Chisholm; Johansson; Solveig Sandness	Johansson	3:50
22.	"Yeh, Yeh, Yeh" (Shanghai Surprise Remix)	Chisholm; Lawrence		3:43

== Personnel ==
- Melanie C – vocals
- Marius De Vries – keyboards (1), programming (1)
- Alexis Smith – keyboards (1), programming (1)
- Peter-John Vettese – acoustic piano (2), string arrangements (2)
- Damian LeGassick – keyboards (3, 5, 7, 10), programming (3, 5, 7, 10), guitars (10)
- Charlie Judge – keyboards (4)
- James Sanger – programming (4)
- Rick Nowels – acoustic piano (4), Fender Rhodes (4), Wurlitzer electric piano (4), Mellotron (4), Korg Trinity (4), acoustic guitars (4), backing vocals (4), horn arrangements (4)
- Guy Chambers – keyboards (6), arrangements (6)
- Richard Flack – programming (6), percussion (6)
- Jamie Candiloro – keyboards (7, 11), acoustic piano (9, 11)
- Phil Thornalley – keyboards (7), guitars (7), arrangements (7)
- John Savannah – acoustic piano (8), synthesizers (8)
- Gary Clark – all other instruments (8)
- Jake Davies – programming (11)
- Rhett Lawrence – programming (12), guitars (12), arrangements (12)
- Robert Howard – guitars (1), additional backing vocals (1)
- Milton McDonald – guitars (1)
- Lewis Taylor – guitars (3), backing vocals (3)
- Rusty Anderson – electric guitars (4), guitars (7, 9, 11)
- Chris Garcia – "chink" guitar (4), bass (4), various percussion (4), backing vocals (4)
- Jon Stewart – guitars (5)
- Phil Palmer – acoustic guitar (6)
- Phil Spalding – electric guitar (6), bass guitar (6)
- David Munday – guitars (7)
- James Woodrow – guitars (7)
- Eric Erlandson – guitars (9, 11)
- Marcus Brown – mandolin (9), keyboards (11), guitars (11), percussion (11)
- Monte Pittman – guitars (10)
- Mike Busby – guitars (12)
- Olle Romo – guitars (12)
- Kim Khahn – bass guitar (1)
- Peter Wilson – bass guitar (5)
- Paul Bushnell – bass guitar (7, 9, 11)
- Steve Sidelnyk – drums (1)
- Pete Hofmann – additional drum programming (1)
- Curt Bisquera – drums (4)
- Wayne Rodrigues – drum programming (4), DJ (12)
- Andy MacLure – drums (5)
- Ian Thomas – drums (6), drum loops (6), percussion (6)
- Abe Laboriel Jr. – drums (7, 9, 11)
- Luís Jardim – percussion (3, 7)
- Simon Clarke – baritone saxophone (3), alto flute (3)
- Brandon Fields – saxophones (4), trumpet (4)
- Bill Reichenbach Jr. – saxophones (4), horn arrangements (4)
- Rowland Sutherland – bass flute (7)
- Roddy Lorimer – flugelhorn (3)
- Jerry Hey – trumpet (4), horn arrangements (4)
- Stella Page – viola (3)
- Prabjote Osahn – violin (3)
- Antonia Pagulatos – violin (3)
- Chris Elliott – string arrangements and conductor (1)
- Simon Hale – string arrangements (2)
- Gavyn Wright – string leader (1, 2)
- Claire Worrall – backing vocals (6)

=== Production ===
- Kirstin Johnson – Los Angeles project coordinator (4)
- Matt Roach – art direction, design
- Sean Ellis – photography

Technical credits

- Tim Young – album compiling and mastering at Metropolis Mastering (London, UK)
- Marius De Vries – recording (1)
- Alexis Smith – recording (1)
- Pete Hofmann – drum recording (1)
- Patrick McCarthy – mixing (1–3, 5, 7–11)
- Mark Evans – recording (2)
- Ali Staton – engineer (3)
- Chris Garcia – engineer (4)
- Alan Veucasovic – engineer (4)
- Jon Ingoldsby – mixing (4)
- John Smith – engineer (5, 7)
- Jim Brumby – recording (6)
- Richard Flack – recording (6), mixing (6)
- Jamie Candiloro – engineer (7, 9, 11)
- Gary Clark – engineer (8)
- Damian LeGassick – engineer (10)
- Rhett Lawrence – mixing (12), Pro Tools engineer (12)
- Steve MacMillan – mixing (12), Pro Tools engineer (12)
- David Reitzas – Pro Tools engineer (12)
- Olle Romo – mixing (12), Pro Tools engineer (12)
- Jim Watts – Pro Tools engineer (12)
- Wayne Rodrigues – Pro Tools editing (4)
- James Loughrey – Pro Tools editing (5, 7)
- Sean Spuehler – Pro Tools editing (7, 10)
- Kit Clark – additional engineer (8)
- Andy Ackland – assistant engineer
- Ian Dowling – assistant engineer
- Jeremy Gill – assistant engineer
- Robert Hoile – assistant engineer
- Tim Lauber – assistant engineer
- Kieron Menzies – assistant engineer
- Paul Stanborough – assistant engineer
- Eric White – assistant engineer

== Charts ==
Chart performance for Reason
Chart (2003)	Peak position
Australian Albums (ARIA)	71
Austrian Albums (Ö3 Austria)	39
Dutch Albums (Album Top 100)	69
European Albums (Music & Media)	13
Finnish Albums (Suomen virallinen lista)	36
German Albums (Offizielle Top 100)	13
Irish Albums (IRMA)	47
Scottish Albums (Official Charts)	9
Swedish Albums (Sverigetopplistan)	38
Swiss Albums (Schweizer Hitparade)	21
UK Albums (Official Charts)	5

Chart performance for Reason
Chart (2025)	Peak position
UK Physical Albums (OCC)	99

== Certifications ==
Certifications for Reason
Region	Certification	Certified units/sales
United Kingdom (BPI)	Gold	100,000^{^}
^{^} Shipments figures based on certification alone.
