= Version of Me =

2016 album by Melanie C

Studio album by Melanie C
- Released: 21 October 2016
- Recorded: 2014–2016
- Studio: London Bridge Studios, Peer Music Studios (Los Angeles); Peer Studios (London); Wilding Sounds (Bristol)
- Genre: Pop
- Length: 42:21
- Label: Red Girl; RCA
- Producer: Paul Boddy; Dele Ladimeji; SOS Music; Tom Wilding

Melanie C chronology
Live at Shepherd's Bush Empire (2013)	Version of Me (2016)	Melanie C (2020)

Singles from Version of Me
- 1. "Anymore" Released: 6 September 2016; 2. "Dear Life" Released: 16 December 2016; 3. "Hold On" Released: 17 March 2017; 4. "Room For Love" Released: 20 October 2017

Version of Me is the seventh studio album by the English singer Melanie C. It was released on 21 October 2016 by Red Girl Records to highly positive reviews. It became her highest-charting album since 2005's Beautiful Intentions, debuting at number 25 on the UK Albums Chart. It was released in Germany at a later date in 2017 becoming her first album to chart outside of the top 20.

== Background and composition ==
Melanie C started recording the album in 2014, and it was not her only focus at the time. She elaborated,

"Because in the past, I've gone "Right. It's album time" with back-to-back writing sessions. But, with this record, I had other stuff going on. And actually, I think it's really benefited the record because I never got stale, you know? It just felt like life kept on happening and all of these scenarios kept coming up, and it was really inspiring. I didn't feel like I was repeating myself because I was just taking my time, so that was really cool. One of the songs on the album, as you know, is "Version of Me," and I thought this is a really good album title. Each record has been me at that moment in time, and this is really an expression of what's going on in my life in the last five years. So, that felt really good. I also like the thought that we all do this, we all have versions of ourselves. We're very different speaking to our friends than to our boss, or when we're in school with a teacher. We are this person, but there's so many versions of us".

Musically, Version of Me is a pop album with elements of R&B and electronica.

== Promotion ==
During two An Intimate Evening with Melanie C special events at Under the Bridge in London, Melanie C performed some songs from Version of Me as well as her old hits. She also performed a set of songs acoustically at her show at G-A-Y on 2 October 2016. On 10 November 2016, Melanie appeared on Celebrity Juice, on what was the last episode of the sixteenth series. On 12 November 2016, Dear Life was played for the first time as a single on Graham Norton's BBC Radio 2 show.

In support of the album, several singles were released. On 29 July 2016, Melanie released "Numb" as the first promotional single for the album. "Anymore" was released as the album's lead single on 6 September 2016. It reached number one on the UK physical chart. "Dear Life" was released as the second single on 16 December. On 17 March 2017, "Hold On" featuring Alex Francis was released as the third single. It was not included on the original version of the album, but featured on the deluxe release.

Melanie announced "Room for Love" as the fourth single on 13 October 2017, with its release scheduled for 20 October.

=== Tour ===
Melanie embarked on the Version of Me Tour in April 2017. She visited fourteen cities, starting in Glasgow on 4 April and finishing in Stuttgart on 9 May. She also visited Mexico City for the first time in her solo career.

== Critical reception ==
Professional ratings
Review scores
Source	Rating
AllMusic	3/5 stars
Auspop	5/5 stars
Daily Express	3/5 stars
The Independent	3/5 stars
Music News	5/5 stars

Stephen Thomas Erlewine from AllMusic found that the songs on the album "have strong contours: not necessarily hookier melodies, but arrangements that emphasize movement instead of shimmer. Version of Me still tends to collapse into style, grooving on feel instead of song, but Melanie C actually winds up giving the album a bit of a kick. No matter how anodyne and elegant her electronic surrounds are, she punctures their sheen with her earthiness, and that gives Version of Me an unexpectedly nervy heart." Martin Townsend from The Daily Express called the album "a very deliberate exercise in modern RR&B flavoured pop. This feels, at times, like a mistake: "Numb," in particular, is laden with so much sonic trickery it sounds like builders are working in the studio [but] when the producers calm down and her huskily powerful but always slightly vulnerable voice is allowed to soar, as on the closing quartet of tracks, the results are superb."

Music News's Jeremy Williams-Chalmers called the album "a must-listen" and wrote: "Version of Me is aptly titled. It is definitively Melanie C, but as ever a Melanie C that has not been explored on record previously [...] Teaming up with Sons of Sonix gives Melanie C a sound that is current and straddles a perfect balance between winning over new, younger fans and pleasing the wants of her fans of old [...] As a result the album is more R'n'B anthem heavy than any of Melanie's earlier work, but this is no bad thing." Michael Smith from Renowned for Sound described the album as "an on-trend collection of songs; one that shows her potential place with electronic music in the future, despite still leaning very close to the pop spectrum, and cements her potential versatility simultaneously. Rather than allowing her career to grow stale after seventeen years as a solo artist, Melanie C takes a stab at something a little different with Version of Me and easily pulls it off."

== Chart performance ==
Version of Me debuted and peaked at number 25 on the UK Albums Chart, becoming Melanie C's highest-charting album since Beautiful Intentions (2005).

== Track listing ==
Version of Me track listing
No.	Title	Writer(s)	Producer(s)	Length
1.	"Dear Life"	Adam Argyle; Melanie Chisholm	SOS Music	3:27
2.	"Escalator"	Chisholm; Richard Judge; Tom Wilding	Wilding	3:22
3.	"Anymore"	Argyle; Chisholm	SOS Music	3:03
4.	"Something for the Fire"	Chisholm; Olly Knights; Gale Paridjanian	Wilding	3:48
5.	"Version of Me"	Nicholas Atkinson; Chisholm; Wilding	Wilding	4:00
6.	"Numb"	Olaniyi Michael Akinkunmi; Chisholm; Moses Ayo Samuels; Varren Wade	SOS Music	3:30
7.	"Room for Love"	Akinkunmi; Chisholm; Samuels; Wade	SOS Music	3:20
8.	"Unravelling"	Chisholm; Rick Nowels	Wilding	4:41
9.	"Loving You Better"	Akinkunmi; Chisholm; Samuels; Wade	SOS Music	4:44
10.	"Our History"	Paul Boddy; Chisholm; Dele Ladimeji	Boddy; Ladimeji	3:51
11.	"Blame"	Chisholm; Peter-John Vettese	Jonas Westling; Wilding	4:35
Total length:				42:21

German deluxe edition bonus track
No.	Title	Writer(s)	Producer(s)	Length
12.	"Hold On" (featuring Alex Francis)	Chisholm; Greg Hatwell; Westling	Westling	3:22
Total length:				45:43

Brazilian edition bonus track
No.	Title	Writer(s)	Producer(s)	Length
12.	"One Minute"	Chisholm; Judge; Wilding	Wilding; Hatwell	3:14
Total length:				45:35

Deluxe edition bonus disc
No.	Title	Writer(s)	Producer(s)	Length
1.	"Dear Life" (Live from Ronnie Scott's)	Argyle; Chisholm		3:31
2.	"Version of Me" (Live from Ronnie Scott's)	Atkinson; Chisholm; Wilding		4:03
3.	"Something for the Fire" (Live from Ronnie Scott's)	Chisholm; Knights; Paridjanian		3:56
4.	"Never Be the Same Again" (Live from Ronnie Scott's)	Chisholm; Paul F. Cruz; Rhett Lawrence; Lisa Lopes; Lorenzo Martin		3:32
5.	"Anymore" (At Night HiFi remix)	Argyle; Chisholm	SOS Music; At Night HiFi^{[a]}	5:38
6.	"Anymore" (Full Intention dub mix)	Argyle; Chisholm	SOS Music; Full Intention^{[a]}	5:44
7.	"Anymore" (Seamus Haji remix)	Argyle; Chisholm	SOS Music; Seamus Haji^{[a]}	6:00
8.	"Dear Life" (Grant Nelson radio edit)	Argyle; Chisholm	SOS Music; Grant Nelson^{[a]}	3:24
9.	"Dear Life" (Grant Nelson dub)	Argyle; Chisholm	SOS Music; Nelson^{[a]}	6:14
10.	"Dear Life" (Reuben Keeney extended mix)	Argyle; Chisholm	SOS Music; Reuben Keeney^{[a]}	4:58
11.	"One Minute"	Chisholm; Judge; Wilding	Wilding; Hatwell	3:14
Total length:				50:19

Notes

- ^{^[a]} signifies an additional producer

== Charts ==
Chart performance for Version of Me
Chart (2016–2017)	Peak position
German Albums (Offizielle Top 100)	34
Irish Albums (IRMA)	94
Scottish Albums (OCC)	28
Spanish Albums (PROMUSICAE)	83
Swiss Albums (Schweizer Hitparade)	24
UK Albums (OCC)	25
UK Indie Albums (OCC)	2

== Release history ==
Release history for Version of Me
Region	Date	Format(s)	Label	Ref.
Various	21 October 2016	CD; digital download	Red Girl	
