= Let's Love =

Let's Love may refer to:

- Let's Love (album), a 1974 album by Peggy Lee, and the title track
- "Let's Love" (Melanie C song), a Japanese-only release from Melanie C's 2003 album Reason
- "Let's Love" (Johnny Mathis song), from the 1959 album More Johnny's Greatest Hits
- "Let's Love" (Suho song), a song by Suho from the 2020 album Self-Portrait
- "Let's Love" (David Guetta and Sia song), a 2020 song by David Guetta and Sia
