= Northern Star (song) =

1999 single by Melanie C

Single by Melanie C

from the album Northern Star
- B-side: "Follow Me"; "Something's Gonna Happen"
- Released: 22 November 1999
- Studio: Various (Los Angeles, London, Glasgow)
- Length: 4:41 (album version); 4:10 (single version); 5:31 (full version)
- Label: Virgin
- Songwriters: Melanie Chisholm; Rick Nowels
- Producer: Marius De Vries

Melanie C singles chronology
"Goin' Down" (1999)	"Northern Star" (1999)	"Never Be the Same Again" (2000)

Audio sample
- file; help

Music video
- "Northern Star" on YouTube

"Northern Star" is a song by British singer-songwriter Melanie C. It is the title track from her debut solo album and was released as the album's second single on 22 November 1999. It was written by Melanie C and Rick Nowels. The song was produced by Marius De Vries and received positive reception from music critics. The single charted at number four on the UK Singles Chart, becoming her third top-five single. It additionally reached the top 20 in Finland, Italy, and Sweden. In the United Kingdom, the single sold 216,000 copies as of June 2017.

== Composition ==
According to the sheet music published by Musicnotes.com by Hal Leonard Corporation, "Northern Star" is composed in the key of A major, and is written in the time signature of common time. It is set in a moderate tempo of 101 beats per minute, with Chisholm's voice spanning from B_{5} to E♭_{3}. The song has a basic sequence of Dm–Am–B♭–C as its chord progression. The single lasts just over four minutes, being edited from the full track, which lasts almost five and a half minutes.

== Music video ==
The music video for "Northern Star" was shot in England on 8–9 September 1999. It starts off looking into a starry sky at night gradually moving down, looking out to sea towards a large star, with Melanie C walking down a rocky coast surrounded by a desert. She then walks in between two train tracks and as the chorus begins, two trains drive at high speed in opposite directions, later there is a brief scene in a cave with miners. Then Melanie C walks through a somewhat Arctic-like area which blends into an urban setting which instantly changes into a sandy beach. During the instrumental she is seen walking through a forest and crossing over a river during daytime, later back in an urban building set. The video ends with her back on the coast at night.

== Track listings ==
- UK CD1 and Australian CD single
1. "Northern Star" (single version)
2. "Follow Me"
3. "Northern Star" (full version)
4. "Northern Star" (video)
- UK CD2
1. "Northern Star" (single version)
2. "Something's Gonna Happen"
3. "Northern Star" (acoustic version)
- UK cassette single
1. "Northern Star" (single version)
2. "Follow Me"
3. "Northern Star" (full version)
- European CD single
1. "Northern Star" (single version)
2. "Follow Me"

== Credits and personnel ==
Credits are taken from the Northern Star album booklet.

Studios

- Recorded at various studios in Los Angeles, London, and Glasgow
- Mixed at O'Henry's Sound Studio (Burbank, California)
- Mastered at Sterling Sound (New York City)

Personnel

- Melanie Chisholm – writing
- Rick Nowels – writing
- Marius De Vries – production
- Patrick McCarthy – mixing
- Ted Jensen – mastering

== Charts ==
=== Weekly charts ===
Chart (1999–2000)	Peak position
Australia (ARIA)	82
Belgium (Ultratip Bubbling Under Flanders)	9
Czech Republic (IFPI)	20
Europe (Eurochart Hot 100)	31
Finland (Suomen virallinen lista)	16
Germany (GfK)	50
Iceland (Íslenski Listinn Topp 40)	22
Italy (Musica e dischi)	14
Italy Airplay (Music & Media)	4
Scotland Singles (OCC)	5
Sweden (Sverigetopplistan)	7
Switzerland (Schweizer Hitparade)	75
UK Singles (OCC)	4

=== Year-end charts ===
Chart (1999)	Position
Sweden (Hitlistan)	80
UK Singles (OCC)	98

== Certifications ==
Region	Certification	Certified units/sales
Sweden (GLF)	Gold	15,000^{^}
United Kingdom (BPI)	Silver	216,000
^{^} Shipments figures based on certification alone.

== Release history ==
Region	Date	Format(s)	Label(s)	Ref.
United States	25 October 1999	Adult contemporary; hot adult contemporary radio	Virgin	
United States	26 October 1999	Contemporary hit radio	Virgin	
United Kingdom	22 November 1999	CD; cassette	Virgin	
