= Anymore =

Anymore may refer to:

== Songs ==
- "Anymore" (Goldfrapp song), 2017
- "Anymore" (Melanie C song), 2016
- "Anymore" (Teresa Brewer song), 1960
- "Anymore" (Travis Tritt song), 1991
- "Anymore", by Atmosphere from Mi Vida Local, 2018
- "Anymore", by the Cat Empire from Cities, 2006
- "Anymore", by Jeon Somi from XOXO, 2021
- "Anymore", by Trevor Daniel from Nicotine, 2020
- "Anymore", by Whitney Houston from I'm Your Baby Tonight, 1990

== Grammar ==
- Positive anymore

== See also ==
- Anymore for Anymore, album by Ronnie Lane
- "Not Anymore", song by LeToya Luckett 2009
