= Here It Comes Again (Melanie C song) =

2003 single by Melanie C

Single by Melanie C

from the album Reason
- B-side: "Love to You"; "Like That"; "Living Without You"
- Released: 24 February 2003
- Studio: Various
- Length: 4:07
- Label: Virgin
- Songwriters: Melanie C; Marius De Vries; Robert Howard
- Producer: Marius De Vries

Melanie C singles chronology
"If That Were Me" (2000)	"Here It Comes Again" (2003)	"On the Horizon" (2003)

Music video
- "Here It Comes Again" on YouTube

"Here It Comes Again" is a song by British singer Melanie C. It was released as the lead single from her second album, Reason (2003), on 24 February 2003. The single was relatively well promoted on radio, TV shows, and magazine interviews, while also going into Europe to do some promotion. The single initially hit a midweek position of No. 4, but during the week, it fell down the chart and finished at No. 7. "Here It Comes Again" went on to be the 191st-highest-selling single of 2003 in the UK.

== Music video ==
The music video was directed by Charles Infante on 17 November 2002 and was shot in Los Angeles. In the city, Melanie C is in the alleyway, singing. She is also near the bridge. A group of people runs through the bridge, passing Melanie over. The group arrives at the alleyway and they climb to the other side of the wall where Melanie is singing. The group again passes Melanie over. Melanie is then seen near the mountains. The same group of people also arrives there. The group finds Melanie and they watch the sunset as the video ends.

== Track listings ==
- UK and Australian CD single
1. "Here It Comes Again" (radio edit) – 4:04
2. "Love to You" – 4:36
3. "Like That" – 3:09
- UK cassette single; European and Canadian CD single
1. "Here It Comes Again" (radio edit) – 4:04
2. "Love to You" – 4:36
- UK DVD single
1. "Here It Comes Again" (video)
2. "Love to You"
3. "Living without You"
4. Behind the Scenes at "Here It Comes Again" video shoot

== Credits and personnel ==
Credits are lifted from the Reason album booklet.

Studios

- Recorded at various studios in Los Angeles and London
- Mixed at O'Henry Sound Studios, 1808, Sound Gallery Studios (Los Angeles), and Mayfair Studios (London, England)
- Mastered at Metropolis Mastering (London, England)

Personnel

- Melanie C – writing
- Marius De Vries – writing, keyboards, programming, production, recording engineer
- Robert Howard – writing, additional backing vocals, guitar
- Milton McDonald – guitar
- Kim Khahn – bass
- Alexis Smith – keyboards, programming, recording engineer
- Steve Sidelnyk – drums
- Chris Elliott – string arrangement, conducting
- Gavyn Wright – concertmaster
- Pete Hofmann – additional drum programming, recording (drums)
- Pete Davis – additional programming
- Patrick McCarthy – mixing
- Tim Young – mastering

== Charts ==
=== Weekly charts ===
Chart (2003)	Peak position
Australia (ARIA)	49
Austria (Ö3 Austria Top 40)	49
Belgium (Ultratip Bubbling Under Flanders)	2
Belgium (Ultratip Bubbling Under Wallonia)	18
Denmark (Tracklisten)	15
Europe (Eurochart Hot 100)	18
Germany (GfK)	59
Greece (IFPI)	15
Ireland (IRMA)	19
Italy (FIMI)	12
Netherlands (Dutch Top 40)	36
Netherlands (Single Top 100)	22
Scottish Singles Sales (Official Charts)	6
Spain (Promusicae)	16
Sweden (Sverigetopplistan)	36
Switzerland (Schweizer Hitparade)	61
UK Singles (Official Charts)	7

=== Year-end charts ===
Chart (2003)	Position
UK Singles (OCC)	191

== Release history ==
Region	Date	Format(s)	Label(s)	Ref(s).
United Kingdom	24 February 2003	CD; cassette; DVD	Virgin	
Australia	10 March 2003	CD	Virgin	
