= Melt (Melanie C song) =

2003 song by Melanie C

Single by Melanie C

from the album Reason
- A-side: "Yeh Yeh Yeh" (UK double A-side)
- B-side: "Knocked Out"
- Released: 10 November 2003
- Genre: Pop rock
- Length: 3:44
- Label: Virgin
- Songwriters: Guy Chambers; Melanie Chisholm
- Producers: Guy Chambers; Richard Flack

Melanie C singles chronology
"On the Horizon" (2003)	"Melt" / "Yeh Yeh Yeh" (2003)	"Next Best Superstar" (2005)

Music video
- "Melt" on YouTube

"Melt" is a song by British singer-songwriter Melanie C. It was released as the third and final single from her second solo album, Reason (2003). The song was released as a double A-side with "Yeh Yeh Yeh" in the United Kingdom. In other countries, "Yeh Yeh Yeh" was serviced on its own as the final single. The black and white music video, directed by Jamie Vickery, features behind the scenes footage from the Reason Tour.

== Background and release ==
Alongside "Yeh Yeh Yeh", "Melt" was a last-minute addition to the Reason track list. The original plan was to release only "Yeh Yeh Yeh" as the third single on 22 September 2003, but shortly before this could happen, Chisholm injured her knee in the TV show The Games during a judo match with Azra Akın. Because Chisholm was limited in movement, she could not fully promote an upbeat song with an injury. This caused the original release date to get pushed back, but nevertheless she performed the song with her injured knee in a limited manner. "Melt", being an easier song to promote with an injury, was added to the mix, resulting in the double single.

It was released on 10 November 2003 but there were numerous problems. On most CD1s of the set, the track listing was accidentally swapped so that "Yeh Yeh Yeh" was the first track on the CD. Because of this misprint, and following strong competition in the week of the single's release in UK, lack of proper promotion, and distribution problems, the single entered the UK Singles Chart at number twenty-seven, sealing Chisholm's fate with Virgin Records and further hindering any hope for the album's success. "Melt" was only released in the United Kingdom as a double A-side with "Yeh Yeh Yeh", but in Europe only "Yeh Yeh Yeh" was released.

== Formats and track listings ==
These are the formats and track listings of major single releases of "Melt".

UK CD

1. "Melt" (album version) – 3:44
2. "Yeh Yeh Yeh" (radio mix) – 3:43

UK CD2

1. "Melt" (album version) – 3:44
2. "Yeh Yeh Yeh" (radio mix) – 3:43
3. "Knocked Out" – 3:50
4. "Yeh Yeh Yeh" (music video) – 3:40

== Live performances ==
Melanie C performed the song on the following concert tours and TV shows:

- Reason Tour
- GMTV
- Today with Des and Mel
- V Graham Norton

== Charts ==
Weekly chart performance for "Melt" / "Yeh Yeh Yeh"
Chart (2003)	Peak position
Scottish Singles Sales (Official Charts)	33
UK Singles (Official Charts)	27
