= If That Were Me =

2000 single by Melanie C

Single by Melanie C

from the album Northern Star
- Released: 27 November 2000
- Studio: Various (Los Angeles, London, Glasgow)
- Length: 4:34
- Label: Virgin
- Songwriters: Melanie Chisholm; Rick Nowels
- Producer: Rick Nowels

Melanie C singles chronology
"I Turn to You" (2000)	"If That Were Me" (2000)	"Here It Comes Again" (2003)

Music video
- "If That Were Me" on YouTube

"If That Were Me" is a song by English recording artist Melanie C. It was co-written and produced by Rick Nowels for her solo debut studio album Northern Star (1999). The song's lyrics address the issue of homelessness. Selected as the album's fifth and final single, "If That Were Me" was released on 27 November 2000. The song peaked at number 18 on the UK Singles Chart, becoming Melanie C's first solo single not to reach the top five. The proceeds from its sale went to the Kandu Arts charity.

== Critical reception ==
The lyrics of the song came in for particular criticism from professional music reviewers. Kurt B. Reighley wrote in CMJ New Music Monthly: "When she's singing lyrics like 'I couldn't live without my phone/ And you don't even have a home', it's tough to recall Chisholm's charms." The NME's Andrew Wagstaff recommended people donate to Shelter and ridiculed the song's lyrics: "If, after doing so, you still want to hear our Mel trilling - and this is not a joke - 'I couldn't live without my phone/But you don't even have a home', well, hell, just remember that charity begins at home. So bear the neighbours in mind and wear headphones." Alex Needham described the song in The Guardian as an "ode to a tramp" and suggested the aforementioned rhyming couplet was a strong contender for the worst song lyric ever. Caroline Sullivan of The Guardian likened the song to Phil Collins' critically panned 1989 single "Another Day in Paradise", arguing that they both addressed homelessness with a similar lack of insight. It was also chosen by The Guardian as among "the worst political lyrics in pop" in 2014.

== Music video ==
The music video, which was shot in October 2000, shows Melanie C on the top of a factory and around urban buildings while curling her arms around herself from the cold. There are also scenes of rain in alleyways. The video on the UK CD single features scenes from the music video for Brandy and Ray J's cover of "Another Day in Paradise", but these scenes were removed from television broadcasts for copyright issues.

== Track listings ==
UK CD single
No.	Title	Length
1.	"If That Were Me"
2.	"If That Were Me" (acoustic version)
3.	"When You're Gone" (live with Bryan Adams)
4.	"If That Were Me" (video)

UK cassette single
No.	Title	Length
1.	"If That Were Me"
2.	"If That Were Me" (acoustic version)
3.	"When You're Gone" (live with Bryan Adams)

European CD single
No.	Title	Length
1.	"If That Were Me"
2.	"When You're Gone" (live with Bryan Adams)

Australian CD single
No.	Title	Length
1.	"If That Were Me"
2.	"If That Were Me" (acoustic version)
3.	"When You're Gone" (live with Bryan Adams)
4.	"I Turn to You" (Damian LeGassick radio mix)
5.	"If That Were Me" (video)

== Credits and personnel ==
Credits are taken from the Northern Star album booklet.

Studios

- Recorded at various studios in Los Angeles, London, and Glasgow
- Mixed at O'Henry's Sound Studio (Burbank, California)
- Mastered at Sterling Sound (New York City)

Personnel

- Melanie Chisholm – writing
- Rick Nowels – writing, production
- Patrick McCarthy – mixing
- Ted Jensen – mastering

== Charts ==
Chart (2000–2001)	Peak position
Australia (ARIA)	28
Austria (Ö3 Austria Top 40)	45
Belgium (Ultratip Bubbling Under Flanders)	15
Belgium (Ultratip Bubbling Under Wallonia)	7
Europe (Eurochart Hot 100)	69
Germany (GfK)	58
Ireland (IRMA)	39
Latvia (Latvijas Top 30)	10
Netherlands (Dutch Top 40)	14
Netherlands (Single Top 100)	41
New Zealand (Recorded Music NZ)	22
Scottish Singles Sales (Official Charts)	23
Sweden (Sverigetopplistan)	22
Switzerland (Schweizer Hitparade)	50
UK Singles (Official Charts)	18

== Release history ==
Region	Date	Format(s)	Label(s)	Ref.
United Kingdom	27 November 2000	CD; cassette	Virgin	
Australia	19 February 2001	CD	Virgin	
