= Nadia Rose =

British musician

- Born: 11 June 1993 (age 32); Lambeth, London, England
- Genres: Grime; hip hop
- Occupations: Rapper; songwriter
- Years active: 2015–present

Nadia Rose (born 11 June 1993) is a British rapper and songwriter from Croydon, London.

== Education ==
Rose studied Music and Music Management at university.

== Career ==
Rose released her debut EP Highly Flammable on 13 January 2017 following the successful singles "Station", "BOOM", and "D.F.W.T". Rose is represented by Sony Music Group under the subsidiary Relentless Records. She came fifth in the BBC's 'Sound of 2017' shortlist. In 2018 she released the track WUT2 and appeared in a Stella McCartney catwalk show in Milan.

In 2020, Rose revealed that she had been unable to release new music because of her label. Rose collaborated with Melanie C on the track "Fearless" for Melanie C's self-titled album, Melanie C. The music video had a world premiere on 16 September 2020. Of the collaboration, Rose stated: "“It’s no secret that I’m a super Spice Girls fan so this whole experience has been very surreal."

== Personal life ==
Rose is a cousin of Stormzy.

In 2019, Rose took part in an Operation Black Vote campaign to encourage people from ethnic minority communities to register to vote in the 2019 UK General Election. Rose also took part in the 2019 Grime4Corbyn campaign in support of the Labour Party and its leader Jeremy Corbyn. Rose wrote an article for Metro encouraging people to vote Labour in the election.

== Discography ==
=== Extended plays ===
Title	Details
Highly Flammable	Release: 13 January 2017; Label: Ministry of Sound, Sony Music, Relentless; Format: CD, vinyl, digital download
First Class	Release: 7 August 2020; Label: Qwerky Entertainment; Format: digital download, streaming

=== Singles ===
Year	Title	Album
2016	"Skwod"	Highly Flammable
2017	"Tight Up" (featuring Red Rat)	Highly Flammable
2017	"Puddycat"	Highly Flammable
2017	"Breathe Slow" (featuring Junglepussy)	Non-album singles
2017	"Wat Up" (with 67)	Non-album singles
2017	"Big Woman"	Non-album singles
2018	"WUT2"	Non-album singles
2018	"On Top"	Non-album singles
2018	"Make It Happen"	Non-album singles
2019	"Airplane Mode"	Non-album singles
2020	"Sugar Zaddy"	First Class
2020	"Too Bad"	First Class
2020	"Bad N Boujee"	First Class
2020	"Higher" (featuring Leon Jean Marie)	First Class
2020	"Fearless" (with Melanie C)	Melanie C
2021	"Bad Habits" (with TiZ EAST and Moelogo)	Non-album singles
2021	"Look At Her (L.A.H)" (with Nqobilé and Dancegod Lloyd)	Non-album singles
2021	"WOAH"	Non-album singles
2021	"Light" (with JY MNTL and La Swave)	Non-album singles
2022	"Lyrical Assassin"	Non-album singles
2022	"Recipe"	Non-album singles
2022	"Rooftop"	Non-album singles
