= Northern Star (Melanie C album) =

1999 album by Melanie C

Studio album by Melanie C
- Released: 18 October 1999
- Recorded: March–July 1999
- Studios: O'Henry Sound (Burbank), CaVa (Glasgow), AIR, Angel, Olympic (London), Cello, Fredonia International, Guerrilla Beach, Sound Gallery, The Studio, The Village Recorder (Los Angeles), Royaltone, Track Record (North Hollywood)
- Genre: Pop
- Length: 53:18
- Label: Virgin
- Producers: Craig Armstrong; Marius De Vries; Rhett Lawrence; Damian LeGassick; Patrick McCarthy; Rick Nowels; William Orbit; Rick Rubin

Melanie C chronology
Northern Star (1999)	Reason (2003)

Singles from Northern Star
- 1. "Goin' Down" Released: 27 September 1999; 2. "Northern Star" Released: 22 November 1999; 3. "Never Be the Same Again" Released: 20 March 2000; 4. "I Turn to You" Released: 7 August 2000; 5. "If That Were Me" Released: 27 November 2000

Northern Star is the debut solo studio album by the English singer and songwriter Melanie C. It was released on 18 October 1999 by Virgin Records.

Recording sessions took place earlier in the year, during a hiatus from the Spice Girls. As the primary songwriter or co-writer of the album's 12 songs, Melanie Chisholm temporarily relocated to Los Angeles and enlisted several musicians and producers, including William Orbit, Rick Nowels, Marius de Vries, Craig Armstrong and Rick Rubin. Additional recording took place in London and Glasgow. Musically, the album combines pop with elements of rock, electronica, trance, trip hop, and R&B, which contrasted with the sound of Chisholm's group.

Upon its release, Northern Star received generally favorable reviews from music critics, many of whom praised Chisholm for differentiating her sound while noting the influence of Britpop and Madonna's Ray of Light (1998). An international commercial success, Northern Star reached number one on the Swedish Albums Chart and the top ten in countries including Denmark, Finland, Germany, Ireland, the Netherlands, Norway, and the United Kingdom. Northern Star has been certified triple platinum by the British Phonographic Industry and has, as of 2001, sold over 4 million copies worldwide, making it the best-selling solo album by a member of the Spice Girls.

Northern Star produced five singles. Following "Goin' Down" and "Northern Star," its third and fourth singles "Never Be the Same Again," featuring TLC member Lisa Lopes, and "I Turn to You" became international hits. Both songs earned Chisholm her first solo number ones in the United Kingdom, while the Hex Hector radio mix of "I Turn to You" earned the Grammy Award for Remixer of the Year. "If That Were Me" was released as a charity single. Melanie C promoted Northern Star via numerous live performances and the Northern Star Tour (2000–01), as well as a Channel 4 documentary. The album was re-issued to feature the single mixes of "Never Be the Same Again" and "I Turn to You".

== Background and development ==
Melanie Chisholm launched her career in the 1990s as a member of the English pop girl group Spice Girls. Her first release outside of the group was a duet with Bryan Adams, "When You're Gone," which originally featured on Adams' album On a Day Like Today (1998). Adams and Chisholm first met in September 1996 when the Spice Girls performed on Top of the Pops and ran into each other while the Spice Girls were on the North American leg of the Spiceworld Tour in 1998; Adams asked her to appear on his album. The duet, released as a single on 30 November 1998, encouraged Chisholm to pursue a solo career and secured a top three peak on the UK Singles Chart. Adams and Chisholm wrote three more songs together: "Follow Me", "Angel on My Shoulder" and "You Taught Me", the first two serving as B-sides to the "Northern Star" and "Goin' Down" singles, while "You Taught Me" was released only as a promo to the media.

In 1999, after extensive touring and the departure of Geri Halliwell, the Spice Girls took a hiatus due to the simultaneous pregnancies of Mel B and Victoria Beckham. Chisholm decided to leave England and head to Los Angeles to work on her solo album, which was scheduled for a release in October. In June 1999, the song "Ga Ga" appeared on the soundtrack to the film Big Daddy.

== Recording and production ==
Chisholm worked with producer Rick Rubin, who she befriended a year earlier when the Spice Girls were due to record a track with Blackstreet for Chef Aid: The South Park Album (1998) before it was scrapped. Rubin, who was to produce the shelved collaboration, offered a hand when he heard of Chisholm's songwriting ambitions. Rubin was also Red Hot Chili Peppers' main producer, whose lead singer, Anthony Kiedis, was rumoured to be dating Chisholm at the time. With hopes of releasing an indie rock album, Chisholm named Blur, Oasis, Suede, the Cardigans, and Hole among her influences.

Melanie C said that she was very fond of "everything Madonna has ever done," particularly her 1998 album Ray of Light, and wanted to cut the album with help from Madonna. According to a July 1999 interview with the British edition of Cosmopolitan magazine, Madonna invited Chisholm to spend some time with her. Chisholm contacted William Orbit, the primary producer of Ray of Light, who produced and co-wrote Northern Star's opening track "Go!". Other Ray of Light collaborators Marius de Vries, Craig Armstrong and Rick Nowels also contributed to the album. Billy Steinberg and Rhett Lawrence also contributed to songwriting.

While working with Lawrence on "Never Be the Same Again," Melanie C suggested that the song have a rap by Lisa "Left Eye" Lopes from TLC. Having worked with TLC before, Lawrence contacted their management, and Lopes agreed to record a verse for the song. Steve Jones of the Sex Pistols plays guitar on "Suddenly Monday," "Be the One," and B-side "I Want You Back."

Four months after Chisholm left for Los Angeles, Virgin Records executives were given a work in progress demo CD of the album. The last tracks recorded for the album, "Go!" and "I Turn to You", were not included.

== Music and lyrics ==
Northern Star opens with "Go!" which is described as "a William Orbit-produced slice of swinging '60s pop with electronica underpinnings." It has "opening drum and bass notes" and "booming, Spector-ish drums, percussively-gated guitar roar, sighing backing vocals and some twinkling synth-vibes," while Melanie C's vocals were likened to a "bluesy wail." The album's second track, the titular "Northern Star," is a "silky and atmospheric" ballad with "glassy Ray of Light-esque synth fills [and] ABBA/Roxette-style string runs." Its lyrics convey "feelings of fragility, contemplation, and determination" and offer "a withering assessment of the questionable standards and morals of the music industry." "Goin' Down" is a "distorto-punk" song with "fuzzy and distorted" vocals. Its lyrics could be read as "a break-up anthem" or "a rebuttal directed at the (many) critics who’d been eager to tear the Spice Girls down." The fourth song on the album, "I Turn to You", is a "moody" electronica, disco, and "techno-inflected dance" song with "trancey beats and swirling synths."

"If That Were Me" is "mostly acoustic guitar and strings." Its lyrics reference homelessness ("I couldn't live without my phone / But you don't even have a home") and were specifically derided by several critics. The album's sixth track, "Never Be the Same Again," is an example of the album's "urban-soul influences." The song is "a laid-back R&B number" and "urban balladry" with a rap by Lisa Lopes. "Why" begins "quietly simple but eventually moves into a moving, guitar-driven climax." Lyrically, it is a "gospel-flavored tale of despair," while musically, it resembles trip hop groups Massive Attack and Portishead. "Suddenly Monday" is a "sunny" uptempo song that resembles Britpop and "Beatle-ish power pop."

Track nine, "Ga Ga," is a dance-rock song that was compared to Garbage. Its lyrics describe "masochistic love." "Be the One" is a "gentle, sultry" song that "recalls Edie Brickell," while the penultimate track "Closer" has samba influences. Album closer "Feel the Sun" is a "Madonna-esque symphonic ballad." It sees Chisholm "exert control and manoeuvre her sometimes-unwieldly voice to set the moody and melancholic tone of the song."

== Release and promotion ==
Northern Star was released in Europe on 18 October 1999, and later in North America on 2 November 1999. To promote the album, Chisholm made a number of televised appearances and live performances of the album's songs. Her first gig as a solo artist took place at Leadmill Club in Sheffield on 19 August 1999, in front of a crowd of nine-hundred people. Chisholm performed on the main stage ("V Stage") at the V99 music festival on 21 and 22 August, her first high-profile outing as a solo artist. Her set received mixed to negative reviews, with Darryl Chamberlain of the BBC News calling it an "entertaining performance" while noting his confusion about which direction Chisholm wanted to take as a solo artist: "She could make a refreshing UK alternative to Sheryl Crow or Alanis but judging by her solo career so far - duets with Bryan Adams and other 1980s pop stars in Los Angeles, plus Sex Pistols covers - it's hard to know what she wants to be."

On 30 August 1999, Channel 4 aired a documentary special entitled Melanie C: Northern Star, directed by Hamish Hamilton. The documentary focused on Melanie C's life in Los Angeles during the recording of her debut album. "Closer", "Something's Gonna Happen", "I Wonder What It Would Be Like", "Independence Day", "Northern Star" and "Why" made their first appearances during the documentary.

To promote the release of Northern Star, Melanie C embarked on an international tour of intimate theaters and nightclub venues in the autumn of 1999. Dubbed "From Liverpool to Leicester Square," the tour began in Liverpool, Chisholm's hometown, and visited the United States, Canada, Australia, Japan, and several European countries before culminating in a show at the London Astoria. The following year, Chisholm embarked on a headlining tour, following an appearance at Slane Festival on the grounds of Slane Castle on 26 August 2000. The Northern Star Tour kicked off in Warsaw, Poland, on 31 August 2000, and culminated in Bonn, Germany, on 26 August 2001.

23 years after the album's release, Northern Star was issued on vinyl as part of Record Store Day on 23 April 2022. A limited run of 2,500 copies was manufactured for the album's first release on vinyl. In addition to the album's original 12 tracks, the vinyl release included the track "Follow Me" and the bonus tracks from the 2000 re-release. The double LP included three playable sides to the record, with the fourth side including an etching of the album's back cover art. Following the release, Northern Star reached number 32 on the UK Official Vinyl Albums Chart.

== Singles ==
Melanie C released "Goin' Down" as the lead single from Northern Star in September 1999, her first solo single as a lead artist. The song and its video "gave the public a taste of her new sound and image. Gone were the tracksuits and black tresses of her Spice Girls persona, to be replaced by tartan skirts and spiky blonde hair." The video, directed by Giuseppe Capotondi, is "set at a crowded warehouse party where the track is performed while the police surround the building, seemingly unable to get in." "Goin' Down" reached number four on the UK Singles Chart, making it Chisholm's second top-five hit as a solo artist (following her feature on Adams' "When You're Gone"); it spent six weeks in the top 75. It also reached the top thirty in Australia. "Northern Star" was released as the album's second single on 22 November. It matched the previous single's peak of number four on the singles chart; however, the song spent twelve weeks in the top 75 (including seven weeks in the top 40) and doubled the sales of "Goin' Down." It sold over 200,000 copies in the United Kingdom and additionally reached the top 20 in Finland, Italy, and Sweden.

On 20 March 2000, "Never Be the Same Again" was released as the third single from Northern Star. It became Melanie C's first number-one single as a leading solo artist in the UK. Beating Moloko's "The Time Is Now" to the summit, it sold 144,936 copies in its first week. It was Britain's eighteenth best-selling song of 2000. "Never Be the Same Again" topped the charts in seven countries and became a top-five hit in Australia, Germany, and Italy, among other territories. By April 2021, the song had sold more than 477,000 copies in the UK.

The fourth single from the album, "I Turn to You", was remixed by Hex Hector for its single release. The remix drew "inspiration from the Ibiza party scene." It "became an instant club classic," earning Chisholm her first chart-topper on the US Billboard Hot Dance Club Play chart. Elsewhere, it topped the charts in Australia, Denmark, the Netherlands, and Sweden. In the UK, it became Chisholm's second number-one single following its release on 7 August 2000. It sold 120,000 copies in its first week, altogether selling 360,477 copies, making it the twenty-seventh best-seller of 2000 in the UK. In 2001, Hex Hector won the Grammy Award for Remixer of the Year, Non-Classical for his remix of "I Turn to You."

Selected as the album's fifth and final single, "If That Were Me" was released in November 2000. The song peaked in the UK Singles Chart at number eighteen, becoming the first of her solo singles to not reach the top five. The proceeds from its sale went to the Kandu Arts charity.

== Critical reception ==
Professional ratings
Review scores
Source	Rating
AllMusic	3/5 stars
Entertainment Weekly	C
The Harvard Crimson	B
MTV Asia	7/10
The New Zealand Herald	1/5 stars
Rolling Stone	3/5 stars
Slant Magazine	3/5 stars
Spin	6/10

Northern Star received mixed to generally favorable reviews from music critics. Stephen Thomas Erlewine asserted that "Mel C wants to break from her Sporty Spice persona while proving herself as a legitimate musician and she does, more or less, with a surprisingly diverse record." He added that "Melanie C has a fairly strong voice, a good sense of melody, and carries a tune with some personality, which is one of the reasons why the genre-hopping of Northern Star works." Alexis Petridis of The Guardian wrote that the album is "positively kaleidoscopic" in its incorporation of "trance, Garbage-style techno-rock, R&B ballads and vaguely nu-metalish chest beating." Barry Walters also complemented the album's variety in a Rolling Stone review, suggesting it contains "way more well-sung goodies than you prefab-pop haters might expect" and drawing comparisons to Madonna, Garbage, the Beatles, and Low era David Bowie.

Writing for Slant Magazine, Sal Cinquemani agreed that Melanie C "meets the challenge of distinguishing herself from the Spice Girls" but felt that the ballads "sound like outtakes from Madonna's Ray of Light." Sheng Yuen from MTV Asia wrote that Northern Star showcased Melanie C's versatility, with energetic tracks highlighting her confidence and ballads revealing a softer side, and identified "Never Be the Same Again" as a standout with strong commercial appeal. A less positive review from student publication The Harvard Crimson described Northern Star as "still the same Spice Girls album dressed up in slightly more sophisticated hues." Rob Brunner from Entertainment Weekly felt thath Northern Star shines little light on who [Melanie C] actually is. William Orbit and Craig Armstrong dress her up in techno. TLC's Left Eye lets her try R&B. Rick Rubin helps her fake alt-rock. Mel's not a bad singer, but Star's still nothing more than slick pop product." Russell Baillee of The New Zealand Herald described the songs as "warmed-over Madonna, Garbage or Alanis rejects." In a retrospective review for Attitude, published in 2024, Joseph Ryan-Hicks wrote that Melanie C achieved her goal of creating "an indie record inspired by Blur and Suede with a dash of Madonna’s magnum opus Ray of Light."

== Commercial performance ==
Northern Star debuted at number 10 on the UK Albums Chart, in the issue dated 24 October 1999. Album sales increased in the UK when "Never Be the Same Again" was released as a single, entering the top 10 again and moving to number five two weeks later. Northern Star kept selling steadily well during the following months, until "I Turn to You" was released in August 2000, when sales took off again and Northern Star achieved its peak position on 2 September 2000, hitting number four of the album chart, nearly a year after its release. As of October 2016, Northern Star had spent 79 weeks on the official UK Albums Chart. Its last appearance on it was in January 2004, nearly 4 1/2 years after its release. It has sold over 890,000 copies in the UK, as of October 2016. In the United States, it failed to chart in its first week of release. The album sold 6,717 copies in its first week, missing the bottom of the chart by a few hundred. In Canada, it charted at number 15.

With worldwide sales close to 2.5 million copies, it is the biggest-selling solo Spice Girl album.

== Track listing ==
Credits adapted from the liner notes of Northern Star.

No.	Title	Writer(s)	Producer(s)	Length
1.	"Go!"	Melanie Chisholm; William Orbit	Orbit	3:39
2.	"Northern Star"	Chisholm; Rick Nowels	Marius De Vries	4:41
3.	"Goin' Down"	Chisholm; Richard Stannard; Julian Gallagher	De Vries	3:35
4.	"I Turn to You"	Chisholm; Nowels; Billy Steinberg	Nowels	5:49
5.	"If That Were Me"	Chisholm; Nowels	Nowels	4:31
6.	"Never Be the Same Again" (featuring Lisa "Left Eye" Lopes)	Chisholm; Rhett Lawrence; Paul F Cruz; Lisa Lopes; Lorenzo Martin	Lawrence	4:52
7.	"Why"	Chisholm; De Vries; Steve Sidelnyk	De Vries	5:27
8.	"Suddenly Monday"	Chisholm; Matt Rowe; Stannard; Gallagher	Rick Rubin	2:36
9.	"Ga Ga"	Chisholm; Phil Thornalley; Dave Munday	Rubin	3:50
10.	"Be the One"	Chisholm; Thornalley; Munday	Rubin	3:35
11.	"Closer"	Chisholm; Nowels; Steinberg	De Vries	5:41
12.	"Feel the Sun"	Chisholm; Nowels	Craig Armstrong; Patrick McCarthy; Damian LeGassick	5:02
Total length:				53:18

Japanese edition
No.	Title	Writer(s)	Producer(s)	Length
9.	"Follow Me"	Chisholm; Steinberg; Bryan Adams	De Vries	4:47
10.	"Ga Ga"	Chisholm; Thornalley; Munday	Rubin	3:50
11.	"Be the One"	Chisholm; Thornalley; Munday	Rubin	3:35
12.	"Closer"	Chisholm; Nowels; Steinberg	De Vries	5:41
13.	"Feel the Sun"	Chisholm; Nowels	Armstrong; McCarthy; LeGassick	5:02
Total length:				58:05

2000 Reissue bonus tracks
No.	Title	Writer(s)	Producer(s)	Length
13.	"Never Be the Same Again" (single mix) (featuring Lisa "Left Eye" Lopes)	Chisholm; Lawrence; Cruz; Lopes; Martin	Lawrence	4:14
14.	"I Turn to You" (Hex Hector radio mix)	Chisholm; Nowels; Steinberg	De Vries; Hex Hector^{[a]}	4:12
Total length:				61:44

=== Notes ===
- ^{^[a]} signifies a remixer

== Charts ==
=== Weekly charts ===
Weekly chart performance for Northern Star
Chart (1999–2000)	Peak position
Australian Albums (ARIA)	32
Austrian Albums (Ö3 Austria)	16
Belgian Albums (Ultratop Flanders)	28
Canada Top Albums/CDs (RPM)	15
Canadian Albums (Billboard)	16
Danish Albums (Hitlisten)	7
Dutch Albums (Album Top 100)	8
European Albums (Music & Media)	7
Finnish Albums (Suomen virallinen lista)	6
German Albums (Offizielle Top 100)	7
Hungarian Albums (MAHASZ)	8
Irish Albums (IRMA)	9
New Zealand Albums (RMNZ)	36
Norwegian Albums (VG-lista)	3
Scottish Albums (Official Charts)	3
Swedish Albums (Sverigetopplistan)	1
Swiss Albums (Schweizer Hitparade)	12
UK Albums (Official Charts)	4

=== Year-end charts ===
Year-end chart performance for Northern Star
Chart (1999)	Position
UK Albums (OCC)	67
Chart (2000)	Position
Austrian Albums (Ö3 Austria)	49
Belgian Albums (Ultratop Flanders)	86
Danish Albums (Hitlisten)	12
Dutch Albums (MegaCharts)	59
European Albums (Music & Media)	20
German Albums (Official Top 100)	31
Swiss Albums (Schweizer Hitparade)	65
UK Albums (OCC)	24

== Certifications and sales ==
Certifications for Northern Star
Region	Certification	Certified units/sales
Australia (ARIA)	Gold	35,000^{^}
Canada (Music Canada)	Gold	50,000^{^}
Denmark (IFPI Danmark)	Platinum	57,401
Germany (BVMI)	Platinum	300,000^{^}
Netherlands (NVPI)	Gold	50,000^{^}
Sweden (GLF)	Platinum	80,000^{^}
Switzerland (IFPI Switzerland)	Gold	25,000^{^}
United Kingdom (BPI)	3× Platinum	900,000
United States	—	500,000
Summaries
Europe (IFPI)	2× Platinum	2,000,000^{*}
Worldwide	—	2,500,000
^{*} Sales figures based on certification alone.^{^} Shipments figures based on certification alone.
