= Let's Love (Melanie C song) =

2003 single by Melanie C

Single by Melanie C

from the album Reason
- B-side: "Like That"; "Living Without You"
- Released: 6 August 2003
- Length: 3:23
- Label: Virgin
- Songwriter(s): Melanie Chisholm; Dave Munday; Phil Thornalley
- Producer(s): Phil Thornalley; Patrick McCarthy

Audio
- "Let's Love" on YouTube

"Let's Love" is a song by English singer Melanie C from her second studio album, Reason. It was released as a single exclusively in Japan on 6 August 2003, after "Let's Love" was licensed to a Toyota TV commercial that ran for six months throughout 2003.

== Performances ==
Although there was no music video to accompany the single's release, Melanie C did perform the song live as part of her Reason Tour. She also included the song in the set-lists of The Barfly Mini-Tour (2004) and This Time Canadian Tour (2008).

== Track listing ==
Japanese CD single

1. "Let's Love" – 3:23
2. "Like That" – 3:09
3. "Living Without You" – 4:06
4. "Let's Love" (instrumental) – 3:23
