= Anymore (Melanie C song) =

2016 song by Melanie C

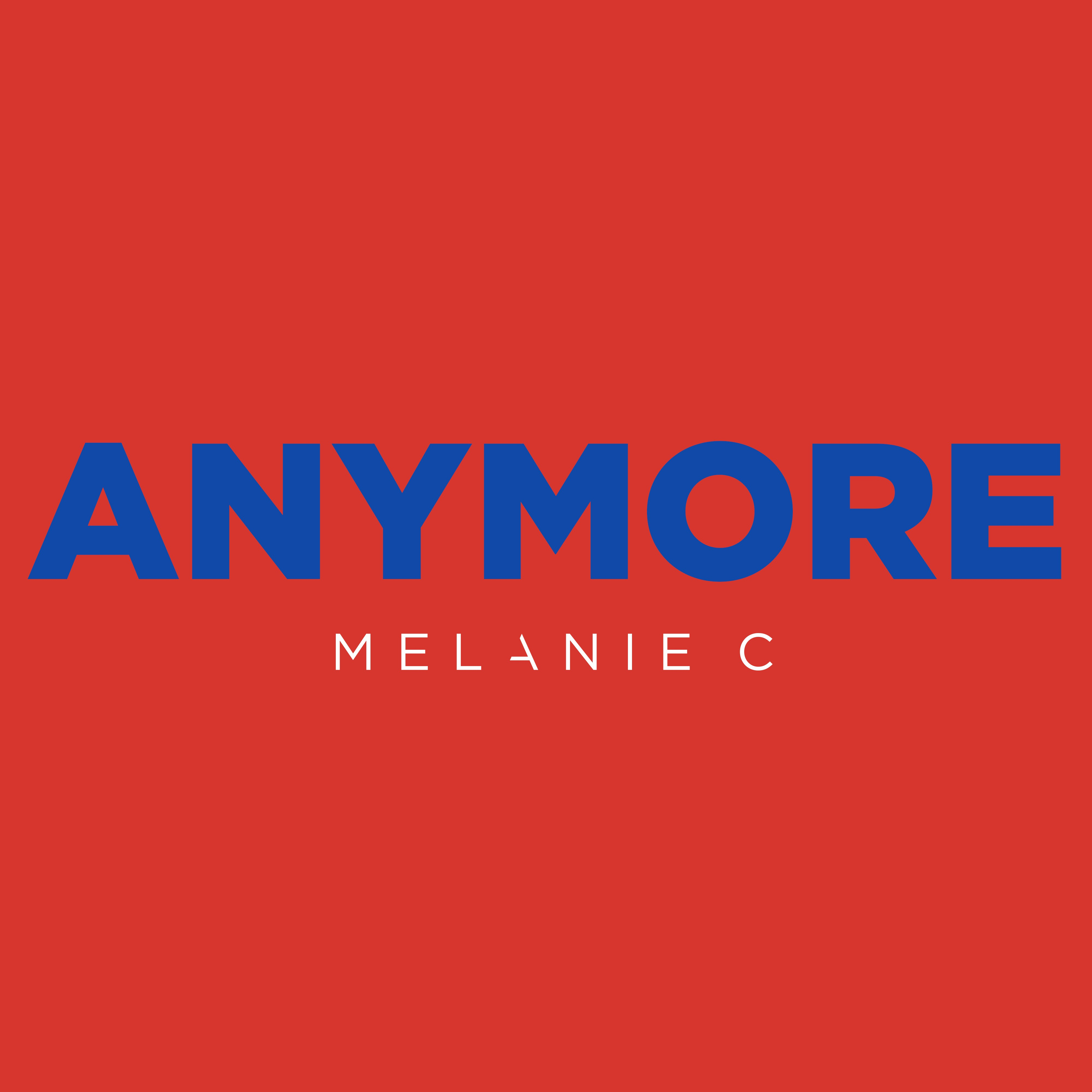

Single by Melanie C

from the album Version of Me
- Released: 6 September 2016
- Genre: Disco; funk; electropop
- Length: 3:03
- Label: Red Girl
- Songwriters: Adam Argyle; Melanie C
- Producer: SOS Music

Melanie C singles chronology
"Numb" (2016)	"Anymore" (2016)	"Dear Life" (2016)

Music video
- "Anymore" on YouTube

"Anymore" is a song by British singer Melanie C, recorded for her seventh studio album Version of Me (2016). A departure from the pop rock sound on her previous albums, the uptempo electropop song was selected as the album's lead single and premiered on radio presenter Chris Evans' BBC Radio 2 breakfast show on September 6, 2016. It reached number one on the UK Physical Singles Sales Chart.

== Background ==
"Anymore" was written by Melanie C and Adam Argyle and deals with a failed relationship. In a 2017 interview with Focus, the singer elaborated on the song: "I wouldn't say I had someone specific in mind. It's more about the general idea of a relationship ending while still being very attached to your ex. You go out with friends and try to distract yourself, but you just can't stop thinking about that person." Musically, Melanie C cited The Weeknd as "a big influence" on the track, commenting: "I wanted to write a song that you just have to dance to." Production on "Anymore" was overseen by Moses "Mo" Samuels and Olaniyi Michael "Mikey" Akinkunmi from South London production duo SOS Music.

== Critical reception ==
Digital Spy editor Lewis Corner called "Anymore" one "of Sporty Spice's poppiest, floor-filling anthems in years," He felt that "Melanie C has never sounded so contemporary and vibrant as she does here, with flourishes of tropical synths bringing her sound right up to date. As one person commented in the Digital Spy office, if Jess Glynne released this it would be a number one hit." Huffington Post critic Daniel Welsh noted that "the song opens with a very moody intro, and it's immediately clear that Melanie C is taking this whole thing very seriously [...] A complete change of direction in the chorus when – in the best way – it becomes melodic [...]." Michael Smith, writing for Renowned for Sound, found that "Anymore" with "the funky synths that dominate its chorus setting the tone of the song even despite its simpler choruses." In a lukewarm review, The Scotsman called the song a "functional disco track."

== Music video ==
An accompanying music video was directed by Dave East and filmed in London and Cape Town. It was released online shortly after its radio debut on 6 September 2016, and made available for stream and download a day later. It sees the singer lose herself in the music at a club, intercut by scenes showing other people dancing.

== Track listings ==
- Digital download/streaming
1. "Anymore" – 3:03
- Digital download/streaming (Remixes)
1. "Anymore" (At Night HiFi Remix) – 5:38
2. "Anymore" (At Night HiFi Edit) – 3:18
3. "Anymore" (At Night HiFi Instrumental) – 5:38
4. "Anymore" (Full Intention Dub Mix) – 5:44
5. "Anymore" (Full Intention Instrumental Mix) – 5:44
6. "Anymore" (Seamus Haji Remix) – 6:00
7. "Anymore" (Seamus Haji Radio Mix) – 2:57
8. "Anymore" (Seamus Haji Dub) – 5:13

== Credits and personnel ==
Credits adapted from the liner notes of Version of Me.

- Adam Argyle – writer
- Melanie Chisholm – writer
- SOS Music (Mo & Mikey) – producer
- Jonas Westling – mixing engineer

== Charts ==
Weekly chart performance for "Anymore"
Chart (2016)	Peak position
UK Radio Airplay (OCC)	26
UK Physical Singles (OCC)	1

== Release history ==
Release history and formats for "Anymore"
Region	Date	Format	Label	Ref.
Various	6 September 2016	Digital download; CD single	Red Girl	
