= Goin' Down (Melanie C song) =

1999 single by Melanie C

Single by Melanie C

from the album Northern Star
- B-side: "Ga Ga"; "Angel on My Shoulder"; "I Want You Back"
- Released: 27 September 1999
- Studio: Various (Los Angeles, London, Glasgow)
- Genre: Rock
- Length: 3:35
- Label: Virgin
- Songwriters: Melanie Chisholm; Richard Stannard; Julian Gallagher
- Producer: Marius De Vries

Melanie C singles chronology
"When You're Gone" (1998)	"Goin' Down" (1999)	"Northern Star" (1999)

Audio sample
- Goin' Down: file; help

Music video
- "Goin' Down" on YouTube

"Goin' Down" is a song by British singer-songwriter Melanie C. Written by Melanie C, Julian Gallagher, and Richard Stannard for her debut solo album Northern Star (1999), the song was produced by Marius De Vries. "Goin' Down" was released as Melanie C's debut solo single in September 1999 and reached the top 10 in the United Kingdom, where it became her first top-five hit as a solo artist. The song also reached the top 30 in Australia, peaking at number 25. According to Melanie C, the song was inspired by "Song 2" by Blur.

== Music video ==
The music video, which was shot in Los Angeles in July 1999, sees Melanie C debuting a new look with blonde spiked hair. She is seen dancing and jumping intensely with a microphone, wearing a tartan (plaid) skirt. There are scenes of people dancing in a giant warehouse styled as a club with policemen driving outside, supposedly to the club as they are later seen trying to get in. Melanie C is in the club throughout the whole video with wind and some water vapor being sprayed towards her in slow motion. The video showcased a dramatic change in Melanie C's sound and image and was banned from certain music channels due to its violent content. The video and song was subsequently parodied by the British comedy double act French and Saunders, in their 1999 Christmas Special, which had Jennifer Saunders performing as Melanie C before being reprimanded by her mother (played by Dawn French).

== Track listings ==
- UK and Australian CD1, UK cassette single
1. "Goin' Down" (radio version) – 3:35
2. "Ga Ga" – 3:49
3. "Angel on My Shoulder" – 3:48
- UK and Australian CD2
1. "Goin' Down" (single version) – 3:35
2. "Ga Ga" – 3:49
3. "I Want You Back" – 3:18
4. "Goin' Down" (enhanced video) – 3:35
- European CD single
1. "Goin' Down" (radio version) – 3:35
2. "Ga Ga" – 3:49

== Credits and personnel ==
Credits are taken from the Northern Star album booklet.

Studios

- Recorded at various studios in Los Angeles, London, and Glasgow
- Mixed at O'Henry's Sound Studio (Burbank, California)
- Mastered at Sterling Sound (New York City)

Personnel

- Melanie Chisholm – writing
- Richard Stannard – writing
- Julian Gallagher – writing
- Marius De Vries – production
- Patrick McCarthy – mixing
- Ted Jensen – mastering

== Charts ==
=== Weekly charts ===
Chart (1999)	Peak position
Australia (ARIA)	25
Europe (Eurochart Hot 100)	18
Netherlands (Single Top 100)	64
Scotland Singles (OCC)	3
UK Singles (OCC)	4

=== Year-end charts ===
Chart (1999)	Position
UK Singles (OCC)	179
