= Never Be the Same Again =

2000 single by Melanie C

Single by Melanie C featuring Lisa Lopes

from the album Northern Star
- B-side: "I Wonder What It Would Be Like"
- Released: 20 March 2000
- Studio: Various (Los Angeles, London, Glasgow)
- Length: 4:52
- Label: Virgin
- Songwriters: Melanie Chisholm; Rhett Lawrence; Paul F. Cruz; Lisa Lopes; Lorenzo Martin
- Producer: Rhett Lawrence

Melanie C singles chronology
"Northern Star" (1999)	"Never Be the Same Again" (2000)	"I Turn to You" (2000)

Lisa Lopes singles chronology
"I Do" (remix) (1999)	"Never Be the Same Again" (2000)	"The Block Party" (2001)

Music video
- "Never Be the Same Again" on YouTube

"Never Be the Same Again" is a song by British singer-songwriter Melanie C from the British girl group Spice Girls, featuring American rapper Lisa "Left Eye" Lopes of American girl group TLC. It was released on 20 March 2000, by Virgin Records, as the third single from her first solo album, Northern Star (1999). The song was co-written by Melanie C, producer Rhett Lawrence, Paul F. Cruz and Lopes.

"Never Be the Same Again" entered at the top of the UK Singles Chart, becoming Melanie C's first solo single to reach number one. It sold 144,936 copies in its first week and was Britain's 18th-best-selling song of 2000. The song was successful in other markets, topping the charts in seven countries and receiving positive acclaim. By April 2021, the song had sold more than 477,000 copies in UK. The accompanying music video was directed by Francis Lawrence. It shows Melanie C waking up in a futuristic home and practicing tai chi with Lopes.

== Composition ==
According to the sheet music published by Musicnotes.com by Hal Leonard Corporation, "Never Be the Same Again" is composed in the key of G minor and is written in the time signature of common time. It is set in a moderate tempo of 80 beats per minute, with Chisholm's voice spanning from G_{3} to E_{5}. The song has a basic chord progression of Gm_{7}–E♭_{9}–B♭_{7}–Dm.

== Music video ==
The accompanying music video for "Never Be the Same Again" was filmed in January 2000 in Malibu, California, and shows Melanie C with short blonde hair as on the CD single cover wearing white clothes. It begins with a CD player (which says "Good day" in Icelandic, suggesting that the video is based in Iceland) and sound system starting up in a metal and glass room in a high building with glass bridges with smoke rising from below with a field background. She is also seen jogging on a treadmill with a changing foreground, lying in shallow water and on a bed in the dark with an orange-colored laser moving down her. Lisa "Left Eye" Lopes comes into the video to do her rap and both are seen doing tai chi. Later, Melanie C is floating up in a high-ceiling room and the video ends with her looking at the outside view. The video includes shots of Iceland's famous Blue Lagoon. The entire idea for the video came from Melanie C herself: she wanted to make a calm video showing her taking care of her health.

== Track listings ==
- UK CD1 and Australian CD single
1. "Never Be the Same Again" (single edit)
2. "I Wonder What It Would Be Like"
3. "Never Be the Same Again" (Lisa Lopes remix)
4. "Never Be the Same Again" (video)
- UK CD2
1. "Never Be the Same Again"
2. "Closer" (live)
3. "Goin' Down" (live)
- UK cassette single
1. "Never Be the Same Again" (single edit)
2. "I Wonder What It Would Be Like"
3. "Never Be the Same Again" (Lisa Lopes remix)
- European CD single
1. "Never Be the Same Again" (single edit)
2. "I Wonder What It Would Be Like"

== Credits and personnel ==
Credits are taken from the Northern Star album booklet.

Studios

- Recorded at various studios in Los Angeles, London, and Glasgow
- Mixed at O'Henry's Sound Studio (Burbank, California)
- Mastered at Sterling Sound (New York City)

Personnel

- Melanie Chisholm – writing
- Rhett Lawrence – writing, production
- Paul F. Cruz – writing
- Lisa "Left Eye" Lopes – writing (as Lisa Lopes), lead rap
- Lorenzo Martin – writing
- Patrick McCarthy – mixing
- Ted Jensen – mastering

== Charts ==
=== Weekly charts ===
Weekly chart performance for "Never Be the Same Again"
Chart (2000)	Peak position
Australia (ARIA)	2
Austria (Ö3 Austria Top 40)	3
Belgium (Ultratop 50 Flanders)	4
Belgium (Ultratop 50 Wallonia)	9
Canada Top Singles (RPM)	27
Canada Adult Contemporary (RPM)	57
Croatia International Airplay (HRT)	6
Czech Republic (IFPI)	6
Denmark (IFPI)	4
Estonia (Eesti Top 20)	1
Europe (Eurochart Hot 100)	2
Finland (Suomen virallinen lista)	8
France (SNEP)	16
Germany (GfK)	5
Greece (IFPI)	7
Hungary (MAHASZ)	4
Iceland (Íslenski Listinn Topp 40)	3
Ireland (IRMA)	3
Italy (FIMI)	6
Netherlands (Dutch Top 40)	1
Netherlands (Single Top 100)	1
Netherlands Airplay (Music & Media)	1
New Zealand (Recorded Music NZ)	1
Norway (VG-lista)	1
Romania (Romanian Top 100)	2
Scottish Singles Sales (Official Charts)	1
Sweden (Sverigetopplistan)	1
Switzerland (Schweizer Hitparade)	3
UK Airplay (Music & Media)	2
UK Singles (Official Charts)	1
UK Hip Hop/R&B (Official Charts)	1

=== Year-end charts ===
Year-end chart performance for "Never Be the Same Again"
Chart (2000)	Position
Australia (ARIA)	14
Austria (Ö3 Austria Top 40)	22
Belgium (Ultratop 50 Flanders)	24
Belgium (Ultratop 50 Wallonia)	40
Brazil (Crowley)	57
Denmark (IFPI)	41
Europe (Eurochart Hot 100)	14
France (SNEP)	57
Germany (Media Control)	24
Iceland (Íslenski Listinn Topp 40)	27
Ireland (IRMA)	32
Italy (Musica e dischi)	38
Netherlands (Dutch Top 40)	13
Netherlands (Single Top 100)	9
New Zealand (RIANZ)	2
Romania (Romanian Top 100)	20
Sweden (Hitlistan)	8
Switzerland (Schweizer Hitparade)	8
UK Singles (OCC)	18

=== Decade-end charts ===
Decade-end chart performance for "Never Be the Same Again"
Chart (2000–2009)	Position
Australia (ARIA)	99
Netherlands (Single Top 100)	56

== Certifications ==
Certifications and sales for "Never Be the Same Again"
Region	Certification	Certified units/sales
Australia (ARIA)	Platinum	70,000^{^}
Austria (IFPI Austria)	Gold	25,000^{*}
Belgium (BRMA)	Gold	25,000^{*}
Denmark	—	3,937
France (SNEP)	Silver	125,000^{*}
Germany (BVMI)	Gold	250,000^{^}
Netherlands (NVPI)	Gold	40,000^{^}
New Zealand (RMNZ)	Platinum	10,000^{*}
Sweden (GLF)	Platinum	30,000^{^}
Switzerland (IFPI Switzerland)	Gold	25,000^{^}
United Kingdom (BPI)	Gold	477,000
^{*} Sales figures based on certification alone.^{^} Shipments figures based on certification alone.

== Release history ==
Release dates and formats for "Never Be the Same Again"
Region	Date	Format(s)	Label(s)	Ref.
United Kingdom	20 March 2000	CD; cassette	Virgin	
New Zealand	22 May 2000	CD; cassette	Virgin	
