= O'Henry Sound Studios =

Recording studio in Burbank, California, US

- Type: Recording studio
- Industry: Music
- Founded: 1993
- Defunct: 2005
- Area served: Burbank, California

O'Henry Sound Studios was a commercial studio complex in Burbank, California, that was owned by engineer Hank Sanicola and his wife, Jacqueline Sanicola. Hank's father, Hank Sanicola Sr. (1914–1974), was Frank Sinatra's longtime manager until 1962.

== History ==
The facility opened in 1993, designed with the help of architect Jack Edwards and studio consultant Rick Ruggieri. The studio closed in 2005.

== Notable recordings ==
=== Album projects ===
- R.E.M.
- k.d. lang
- Mariah Carey
- Ray Charles
- Sugar Ray
- Shakira
- Tool
- Wallflowers
- Anastacia
- Caifanes
- Ray Conniff
- Al Stewart
- Gwen Stefani
- Yellowjackets

=== Commercial soundtracks ===
- Southwest Airlines
- McDonald's
- National Geographic

=== Film credits ===
- King Kong (2005)
- Pooh's Heffalump Movie (2005)
- Sideways (2004)
- The Jungle Book 2 (2003)
- Return to Never Land (2002)
- Don't Say a Word (2001)
- 3000 Miles to Graceland (2001)
- Chicken Run (2000)
- Dinosaur (2000)
- Austin Powers: The Spy Who Shagged Me (1999)
- Election (1999)
- Life (1999)
- Wild Things (1998)
- The Brave Little Toaster to the Rescue (1997)
- Austin Powers: International Man of Mystery (1997)
- Nothing to Lose (1997)
- That Thing You Do! (1996)
- Delta of Venus (1995)
