= Ray Kay =

Norwegian director and photographer

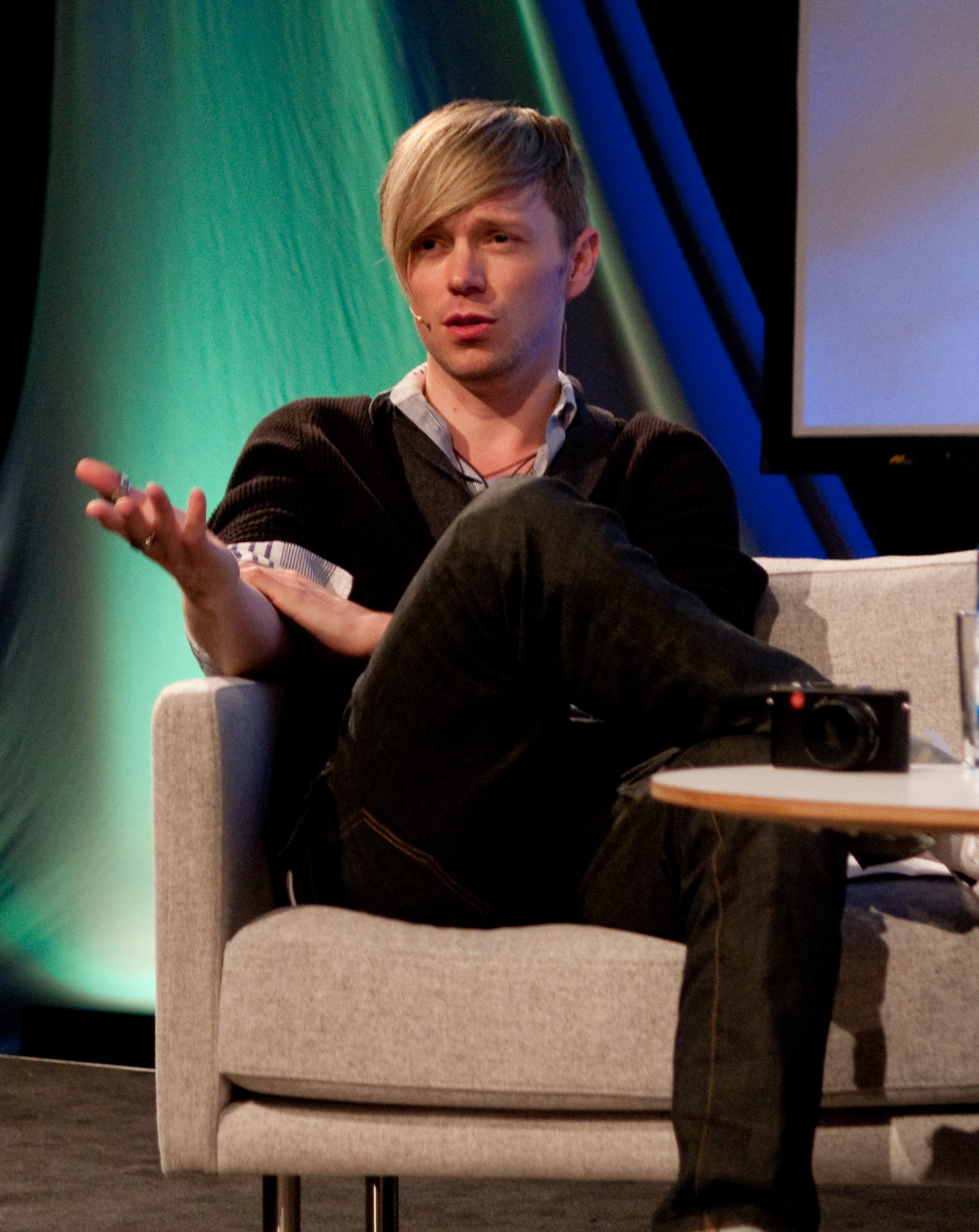

Background information
- Born: Reinert K. Olsen; 10 July 1978 (age 48); Haugesund, Norway
- Occupations: Music video, film and advertising director, photographer
- Years active: 1996–present

Reinert K. Olsen (born 10 July 1978), known professionally as Ray Kay, is a Norwegian director and photographer who is currently based in Los Angeles. He is a music video and advertising director.

Ray Kay mostly directs music videos and has worked with artists such as Cher, Britney Spears, Lady Gaga, Justin Bieber, Jessie J, Nelly Furtado, Beyoncé Knowles, Destiny's Child, Gloria Estefan, Steven Tyler, Enrique Iglesias, Adam Lambert, Cheryl Cole, Alesha Dixon, Diddy, Willow Smith, Amerie, Sean Paul, Christina Milian, The-Dream, Backstreet Boys, Melanie C, Ciara, Snoop Dogg, and Ghostface. He also photographs fashion stills and album covers, and has directed advertisements for brands such as Pepsi, AT&T, Mango and KFC.

His music videos have won several awards, including MTV Video Music Awards (USA), MuchMusic Video Awards and ZTV Awards.

He will make his feature directorial debut with "Paranormalcy", a fantasy film based on the New York Times bestselling book by Kiersten White. He is currently developing the project with Gil Adler.

== Music videography ==
=== 2015 ===
- Taio Cruz – "Do What You Like"

=== 2014 ===
- Adelén – "Olé"
- Justin Morelli – "Nobody Like Me"
- Hunter Hayes – "Invisible"

=== 2013 ===
- Madcon featuring Kelly Rowland – "One Life"
- Madcon featuring Stori – "Say Yeah"
- Toni Braxton and Babyface – "Hurt You"
- Austin Mahone featuring Flo Rida – "Say You're Just a Friend"
- Cher – "Woman's World"
- Lara Scandar – "Falling Out of Love"
- Lara Scandar – "Chains"
- Emblem3 – "Chloe (You're the One I Want)"
- Erika Jayne featuring Flo Rida – "Get It Tonight"
- Lara Scandar – "Taalou Ghannou"

=== 2012 ===
- Girls Aloud – "Something New"
- Havana Brown featuring Pitbull – "We Run the Night"
- Adam Lambert – "Better Than I Know Myself"
- Aura Dione – "Friends"
- Nelly Furtado – "Parking Lot"
- Madcon – "In My Head"
- Meital featuring Sean Kingston – "On Ya"

=== 2011 ===
- Jessie J – "Domino"
- Aura Dione – "Geronimo"
- Gloria Estefan – "Wepa"
- Kristian Valen – "Letting Go"
- Steven Tyler – "(It) Feels So Good"
- Britney Spears – "Till The World Ends"
- Slimmie Hendrix – "Stuntman"
- Bera – "My Favourite Things"
- Victoria Krutoy – "No Breaking Me Down"

=== 2010 ===
- Willow Smith – "Whip My Hair"
- Flo Rida featuring Akon – "Who Dat Girl"
- James Blunt – "Stay the Night"
- Jeremih featuring Ludacris – "I Like"
- Alesha Dixon – "Drummer Boy"
- Range featuring Rick Ross – "Ghetto Dance"
- Orianthi – "Shut Up & Kiss Me"
- Sean Kingston featuring Justin Bieber – "Eenie Meenie"
- Benny Benassi featuring Kelis, apl.de.ap and Jean Baptiste – "Spaceship"
- Victoria Krutoy – "Falling" (co-directed by Sequoia B)
- Justin Bieber featuring Ludacris – "Baby"
- Alex Gardner – "I'm Not Mad"
- Shontelle – "Licky (Under the Covers)"

=== 2009 ===
- Cheryl Cole – "Fight For This Love"
- Adam Lambert – "For Your Entertainment"
- Mini Viva – "I Wish"
- Lara Scandar – "Mission is You"
- Mini Viva – "Left My Heart in Tokyo"
- Sean Paul – "So Fine"
- Amerie – "Why R U"
- Kristinia DeBarge – "Goodbye"
- Paradiso Girls featuring Eve and Lil Jon – "Patron Tequila"
- RichGirl – "He Ain't Wit Me Now (Tho)"
- Chrisette Michele featuring Ne-Yo – "What You Do"
- Jada – "American Cowboy"
- Flipsyde – "When It Was Good"
- Chrisette Michele – "Epiphany"
- Ryan Star – "Last Train Home"
- The-Dream – "Rockin' That Thang"
- Enrique Iglesias featuring Ciara – "Takin' Back My Love"
- Christina Milian – "Us Against The World"

=== 2008 ===
- Trey Songz – "Last Time"
- Sean Kingston featuring Juelz Santana and Élan – "There's Nothin'"
- Kat DeLuna featuring Busta Rhymes and Don Omar – "Run The Show"
- Sirens featuring Najee – "Club LA LA"
- Jordin Sparks – "One Step at a Time"
- Donnie Klang featuring Diddy – "Take You There"
- Lady Gaga – "Poker Face"
- Jadakiss featuring Ne-Yo- "By My Side"
- LMFAO – "I'm in Miami Bitch"
- Mira Craig – "I'm The One"

=== 2007 ===
- LAX Gurlz – "Forget You"
- Beyoncé – "Freakum Dress"
- Sterling Simms – "Nasty Girl"
- Pittsburgh Slim – "Girls Kiss Girls"
- Jagged Edge featuring Ashanti and Jermaine Dupri – "Put a Little Umph in It"
- The-Dream featuring Fabolous – "Shawty Is a 10"
- Backstreet Boys – "Inconsolable"
- Lucy Walsh – "So Uncool" (version 2)
- I Nine – "7 Days of Lonely"
- Johnta Austin – "The One That Got Away"

=== 2006 ===
- Ghostface Killah featuring Ne-Yo – "Back Like That"
- Christina Milian featuring Young Jeezy – "Say I"
- Black Buddafly featuring Fabolous – "Bad Girl"
- Nick Lachey – "What's Left of Me"
- Cassie – "Me & U"
- Nick Lachey – "I Can't Hate You Anymore"
- Monica featuring Dem Franchise Boyz – "Everytime Tha Beat Drop"
- One Chance featuring D4L – "Look at Her"
- Johnta Austin featuring Jermaine Dupri – "Turn It Up"
- Paula DeAnda – "Walk Away (Remember Me)"
- Stacie Orrico – "So Simple"
- Jamelia – "Beware of the Dog"
- Fantasia featuring Big Boi – "Hood Boy"

=== 2005 ===
- Mark Morrison featuring Tanya Stephens – "Dance For Me"
- Melanie C – "Next Best Superstar"
- Natalie – "Goin' Crazy”
- Pretty Ricky – "Grind With Me"
- Mario – "Here I Go Again"
- Frankie J – "How To Deal"
- Teairra Mari – "Make Her Feel Good"
- Mashonda ft Snoop Dogg – "Blackout"
- Pretty Ricky – "Your Body"

=== 2004 ===
- 2Play – "It Can't Be Right"
- Monroe – "Smile"
- Kleen Cut – "Hands Up"
- Shifty – "Slide Along Side"
- Sirens – "Baby (Off The Wall)"
- Christina Milian featuring Joe Budden – "Whatever U Want"
- Nivea featuring Lil Jon and Youngbloodz – "Okay"
- Raghav – "Attraction / Angel Eyes"
- Destiny's Child featuring T.I. and Lil Wayne – "Soldier"
- Duchess – "Come Check My Style"
- Rouge – "Don't Be Shy"
- Trick Daddy featuring Lil' Kim and Cee-Lo – "Sugar (Gimme Some)"

=== 2003 ===
- Anne Lingan – "Kicking You Out"
- Venke Knutson – "Panic"
- Kurt Nilsen – "She's So High"
- Melanie C – "Yeh Yeh Yeh"
- Speedway – "Save Yourself"
- Lene V – Ad spots
- Black Diamond Brigade – "Black Diamond"
- Winta featuring Anton Gordon – "Hot Romance (Rok With U)"
- Coree – "I Don't Give a Damn"
- Winta – "I Want You"

=== 2002 ===
- Equicez – "Live from Passit"
- Lene V – Ad spot
- Paperboys – "Barcelona"
- Sport 1 – Ad spots
- D'lay – "Run Away"
- Ann-Louise – "Can You Tell Me"
- Winta – "Emotions"
- Gil Bonden – "Shine"
- D'sound – "Do I Need a Reason"

=== 2000 ===
- Voodoobeats – "The One"
