= Beautiful Intentions =

2005 album by Melanie C

Studio album by Melanie C
- Released: 11 April 2005
- Recorded: June–October 2004
- Studios: RAK Studios, Angel Recording Studios, Mayfair Studios, Miloco Studios and Metropolis Studios (London, UK); Stir Studios (Cardiff, South Wales, UK)
- Genres: Pop; rock
- Length: 45:26
- Label: Red Girl
- Producers: Greg Haver; Guy Chambers; Paul Boddy

Melanie C chronology
Reason (2003)	Beautiful Intentions (2005)	This Time (2007)

Singles from Beautiful Intentions
- 1. "Next Best Superstar" Released: 4 April 2005; 2. "Better Alone" Released: 1 August 2005; 3. "First Day of My Life" Released: 30 September 2005

Beautiful Intentions is the third studio album by the English singer Melanie C. Released on 11 April 2005, it marked her first release on her self-founded label, Red Girl Records, following her departure from Virgin Records. Developed over the course of a year, Melanie C worked exclusively with producer Greg Haver on material für the album, with additional songwriting input from Deborah Joshua, Peter-John Vettese, Phil Thornalley, Richard Buckton, Tore Johansson, Adam Argyle, and others.

The album received generally positive reviews from critics, who praised its direction and viewed it as Melanie C's strongest solo effort to date, although some criticized the songwriting. Commercially, the album underperformed in the United Kingdom, where it became her lowest-charting solo album at the time, but achieved greater success across continental Europe, reaching number one in Portugal and earning Gold certifications in Germany and Switzerland, as well as Platinum certification in Portugal.

Beautiful Intentions spawned three singles. Lead single "Next Best Superstar" reached number 10 on the UK Singles Chart and charted across several European countries. The Europe-only "Better Alone" achieved moderate chart success, while "First Day of My Life," included on later editions of the album, became the most successful single from the project, reaching number one in Germany and Portugal and helping boost the album's commercial performance across continental Europe.

== Background ==
Following the commercial disappointment of her second studio album, Reason, Melanie C was dropped by Virgin Records after a nine-year association with the label, with the album's poor sales and the underperformance of singles such as "Here It Comes Again" cited as the primary reason for the label's decision. She later attributed the split to changes within the company following EMI's takeover, noting that many of the executives she had worked closely with had departed, making the label "no longer the same." Rather than seeking another recording contract, she chose to establish her own independent label, Red Girl Records, which she co-founded with her manager Nancy Phillips in 2004. The label's name references both the colours of Liverpool F.C., which she supports, and her long-standing nickname.

Development of Beautiful Intentions took place over approximately a year and was briefly interrupted when Melanie C suffered a serious knee injury while training for a television programme, requiring reconstructive surgery and several months of recovery. During this period, she began writing material for the album in her hometown of Liverpool before completing the project with producer Greg Haver. Working independently gave Melanie C greater creative and financial control over the album, although she described the venture as "a little frightening" because she was personally responsible for funding the project. Songs such as "Next Best Superstar" were conceived as a critique of reality television talent competitions and manufactured pop acts, reflecting Melanie C'S own experiences in the music industry and her concerns about the treatment of aspiring artists by record labels.

== Critical reception ==
Professional ratings
Review scores
Source	Rating
AllMusic	4/5 stars
laut.de	2/5 stars
MTV Asia	6/10

AllMusic editor Matthew Chisling found that the "new creative control that Melanie C had over her album broadened her horizons considerably; Melanie allowed herself to fly more freely on Intentions, giving her solo music a sharp new look. On Beautiful Intentions, Melanie C developed her style into an aggressive pop-angled album boasting heavy beats with dramatic rock swings doused in musical cyclones of energy. She borrowed qualities from other heavy-talented rock divas such as Anastacia to produce a more bombastic sampling this time around." He concluded: "The final product is simply dazzling; and Beautiful Intentions is without a doubt the strongest solo album by any of the Spice Girls. Truth be told, it was one of the strongest solo pop albums of 2005, regardless of artist."

Paul Taylor from Manchester Evening News also compared the songs with Anastacia's self-titled 2004 album and called it "a much finer album than we had any right to expect." Betty Clarke, writing for The Guardian remarked: "Released on her own, self-funded Red Girl Records label, the album is a bitter attack on her old employers. A chorus-led confection of vulnerability and hurt, its needling intent – "You'll Get Yours" and "Don't Need This" are just two titles – and aggressive pop-rock sound make it Chisholm's strongest album to date." Irish website Entertainment.ie found that "she certainly delivers these riff-laden songs with gutsy conviction, and her backing band are as tight as they come. But the overall sound has a generic, processed feel to it, and poor old Mel can't write an interesting lyric to save her life. Beautiful Intentions certainly rocks hard, but ultimately it fails to convince." Matthias Manthe from laut.de called Beautiful Intentions "a rock-solid album that doesn't compromise on chart compatibility; Sitting between the rock and pop chairs without stepping on anyone's toes. Mel C sings pleasant tunes about love and the injustices of business."

== Commercial performance ==
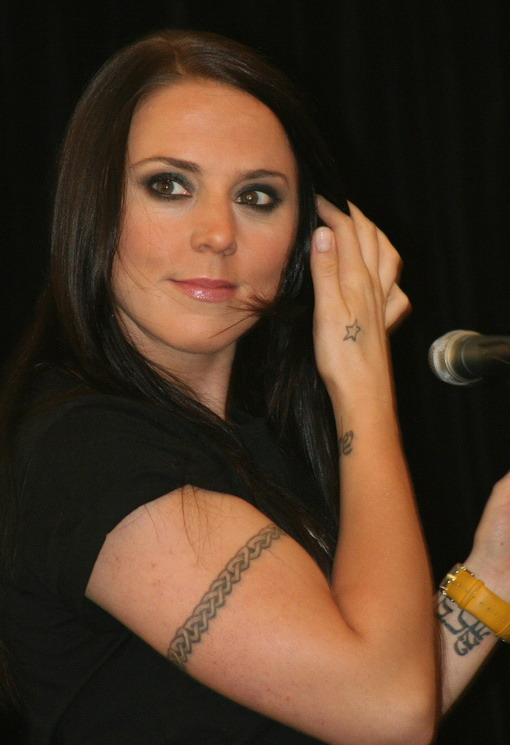
Melanie C in September 2005.

Beautiful Intentions experienced moderate commercial success, with significantly stronger performance in continental Europe than in the United Kingdom, which had previously been Melanie C's primary and strongest sales market. In the United Kingdom, the album debuted at number 24 on the UK Albums Chart in the week of 23 April 2005 and exited the chart in its fourth week. In Scotland, it opened and peaked at number 28 on the Scottish Albums Chart, remaining on the chart for three weeks. It was Melanie C's lowest-charting album up to that point and her first solo release not to receive a British Phonographic Industry (BPI) certification.

Elsewhere in Europe, the album initially experienced a slow start but achieved higher chart positions following the success of the single "First Day of My Life," particularly in Portugal, where it became Melanie C's first number-one album on the Portuguese Albums Chart. The album also reached the top 20 in German-speaking Europe, peaking at number 12 in Austria, number 15 in Germany, and number 14 in Switzerland. Beautiful Intentions further reached the top 40 in Poland and Sweden, peaking at number 28 on the Polish Albums Chart and number 31 on the Swedish Albums Chart. In terms of certifications, the album was certified Gold in Germany for 100,000 units shipped, Gold in Switzerland for 20,000 units, and Platinum in Portugal for 40,000 units.

== Track listing ==
Credits adapted from the liner notes of Beautiful Intentions.

Beautiful Intentions track listing
No.	Title	Writer(s)	Producer(s)	Length
1.	"Beautiful Intentions"	Melanie Chisholm; Paul Boddy; Dele Ladimeji	Greg Haver; Boddy	3:52
2.	"Next Best Superstar"	Adam Argyle	Haver	3:29
3.	"Better Alone"	Chisholm; Peter-John Vettese	Haver	4:35
4.	"Last Night on Earth"	Chisholm; Phil Thornalley; Dave Munday	Haver	3:28
5.	"You Will See"	Chisholm; Carsten Kroeyer; Jacob Binzer; Ajelown Owais; Deborah Joshua	Haver	3:29
6.	"Never Say Never"	Chisholm; Charlie Grant; Peter Woodroffe	Haver; Grant; Woodroffe	3:11
7.	"Good Girl"	Chisholm; Tore Johansson	Haver	4:07
8.	"Don't Need This"	Chisholm; Greg Hatwell; Marc Lane	Haver; Hatwell	3:50
9.	"Little Piece of Me"	Chisholm; Richard Buckton; Woodroffe	Haver	3:00
10.	"Here and Now"	Chisholm; Mathew William Benbrook; Simmons	Haver	4:29
11.	"Take Your Pleasure"	Chisholm; Paul Boddy; Dele Ladimeji	Haver	3:11
12.	"You'll Get Yours"	Chisholm; Vettese	Haver; Vettese	4:43
Total length:				45:26

2006 re-issue edition
No.	Title	Writer(s)	Producer(s)	Length
1.	"First Day of My Life"	Enrique Iglesias; Chambers	Richard Flack	4:04
2.	"Beautiful Intentions"	Chisholm; Boddy; Ladimeji	Haver; Boddy	3:52
3.	"Next Best Superstar"	Argyle	Haver	3:29
4.	"Better Alone"	Chisholm; Vettese	Haver	4:35
5.	"Last Night on Earth"	Chisholm; Thornalley; Munday	Haver	3:28
6.	"You Will See"	Chisholm; Kroeyer; Binzer; Owais; Odedere	Haver	3:29
7.	"Never Say Never"	Chisholm; Grant; Woodroffe	Haver; Grant; Woodroffe	3:11
8.	"Good Girl"	Chisholm; Johansson	Haver	4:07
9.	"Don't Need This"	Chisholm; Hatwell; Lane	Haver; Hatwell	3:50
10.	"Little Piece of Me"	Chisholm; Buckton; Woodroffe	Haver	3:00
11.	"Here and Now"	Chisholm; Benbrook; Simmons	Haver	4:29
12.	"Take Your Pleasure"	Chisholm; Boddy; Ladimeji	Haver	3:11
13.	"You'll Get Yours"	Chisholm; Vettese	Haver; Vettese	4:43
14.	"First Day of My Life" (Making of the music video)			4:05

Brazilian bonus tracks
No.	Title	Writer(s)	Producer(s)	Length
13.	"First Day of My Life"	Iglesias; Chambers	Flack	4:04
14.	"Everything Must Change"	Chisholm; Henry Priestman; Guy Batson	The Erneez	3:32
15.	"Warrior"	Chisholm; Johansson	Johansson	3:47
16.	"Runaway"	Chisholm; Johansson	Haver	3:24

Japanese bonus tracks
No.	Title	Writer(s)	Producer(s)	Length
13.	"First Day of My Life"	Iglesias; Chambers	Flack	4:04
14.	"Runaway"	Chisholm; Johansson	Haver	3:24
15.	"Next Best Superstar" (Culprit One club mix)	Argyle	Haver; Culprit 1^{[a]}	5:29
16.	"Better Alone" (pop mix)	Chisholm; Vettese	Haver; Jon Dixon; Pete Craigie^{[a]}	3:56
17.	"First Day of My Life" (acoustic)	Iglesias; Chambers	Flack	4:04

Portuguese re-release bonus tracks
No.	Title	Length
13.	"First Day of My Life" (RFM − live acoustic)	4:05
14.	"Better Alone" (RFM − live acoustic)	3:01
15.	"Here and Now" (RFM − live acoustic)	3:27
16.	"Next Best Superstar" (RFM − live acoustic)	3:21
17.	"Beautiful Intentions" (RFM − live acoustic)	4:03

Singaporean bonus DVD
No.	Title	Length
13.	"Next Best Superstar" (Music Video)	3:31
14.	"Better Alone" (UK Music Video)	3:59
15.	"Beautiful Intentions" (E.P.K)	17:52
16.	"Photo Gallery"	3:00
17.	"Biography"

Portuguese bonus DVD
No.	Title	Length
13.	"Next Best Superstar" (music video)	3:31
14.	"Better Alone" (European music video)	3:06
15.	"First Day of My Life" (music video)	4:04

Notes

- ^{^[a]} signifies an additional producer

== Personnel ==
Track numbers from Standard and Brazilian releases.

- Melanie Chisholm – vocals
- Nick Nasmyth – keyboards
- Paul Boddy – synthesizers (1), programming (1, 11)
- Clint Murphy – additional programming
- Jimmy Robertson – additional programming (10)
- Peter-John Vettese – keyboards (12), synthesizers (12)
- Martin Slattery – acoustic piano (13)
- Paul Gendler – guitars (1–12, 14–16)
- Greg Hatwell – guitars (1–12, 14–16), backing vocals (2, 8)
- Paul Stanborough – acoustic guitar (13)
- Jenni Tarma – bass (1–12, 14–16)
- Trevor Barry – bass (13)
- Greg Haver – drums (1, 4–6, 9, 12), percussion, additional programming
- Fergus Gerrand – drums (2, 3, 11), percussion (2, 3, 11)
- Vinnie Lammi – drum loop (5), drums (7, 8, 10)
- Richard Flack – drum programming (13), percussion (13)
- John Rea – string arrangements (3, 5, 10, 12)
- Philip Sheppard – string arrangements and conductor (13)
- Simon Morgan – string contractor (3, 5, 10, 12)
- David Emanuel – string leader (3, 5, 10, 12)
- Richard Nelson – string fixer (13)

=== Production ===
- Ian Ross – design
- Mary McCartney – photography
- Nikolaj Georgiew – front cover photography
- Ray Burmiston – additional photography

Technical credits

- Howie Weinberg – mastering at Masterdisk (New York, NY) (1–12, 14–16)
- Master & Servant (Hamburg, Germany) – mastering company (Track 13)
- Clint Murphy – engineer (1–12, 16), mixing (1–12, 16)
- Niall Acott – string engineer (3, 5, 10, 12)
- Gary Thomas – string engineer (3, 5, 10, 12)
- Joachim "Jeo" Mezei – mixing (13)
- The Erneez – mixing (14)
- Tore Johansson – mixing (15)
- Rai Das – assistant engineer (1–12, 16)
- Rohan Onraet – assistant engineer (1–12, 16)
- Jimmy Robertson – assistant engineer (1–12, 16)
- Loz Williams – assistant engineer (1–12, 16)
- James Stone – assistant string engineer (3, 5, 10, 12)
- Steve Davis – additional assistant engineer (1–12, 16)
- Nick Pugh – additional assistant engineer (1–12, 16)
- Neil Tucker – additional assistant engineer (1–12, 16)

== Charts ==
=== Weekly charts ===
Weekly chart performance for Beautiful Intentions
Chart (2005)	Peak position
Austrian Albums (Ö3 Austria)	12
Belgian Albums (Ultratop Flanders)	90
Dutch Albums (Album Top 100)	98
French Albums (SNEP)	98
German Albums (Offizielle Top 100)	15
Italian Albums (FIMI)	68
Polish Albums (ZPAV)	28
Portuguese Albums (AFP)	1
Scottish Albums (Official Charts)	28
Spanish Albums (Promusicae)	52
Swedish Albums (Sverigetopplistan)	31
Swiss Albums (Schweizer Hitparade)	14
UK Albums (Official Charts)	24

=== Year-end charts ===
2005 year-end chart performance for Beautiful Intentions
Chart (2005)	Position
German Albums (Offizielle Top 100)	88
Swiss Albums (Schweizer Hitparade)	70

2006 year-end chart performance for Beautiful Intentions
Chart (2006)	Position
Swiss Albums (Schweizer Hitparade)	85

== Certifications and sales ==
Certifications for Beautiful Intentions
Region	Certification	Certified units/sales
Germany (BVMI)	Gold	100,000^{^}
Portugal (AFP)	Platinum	40,000^{^}
Switzerland (IFPI Switzerland)	Gold	20,000^{^}
^{^} Shipments figures based on certification alone.
