= Exposed (Kristinia DeBarge album) =

Studio album by Kristinia DeBarge
- Released: July 28, 2009
- Recorded: March 2008–February 2009
- Genres: Pop, R&B
- Length: 39:46
- Labels: Island, Teen Island, Sodapop
- Producers: Kenneth "Babyface" Edmonds (also exec.), Antonio "LA" Reid (also exec.), Jeff Burroughs (also exec.), Ryan Tedder, Mel & Mus, The J.A.M., Anthony M. Jones, Roy "Royalty" Hamilton, Jon John Robinson, Skins, Rune Westberg, Pam Sheyne, Inflo 1st, RADIO, Ronnie "Preach" Walton, The Pentagon

Kristinia DeBarge chronology
Exposed (2009)	Young & Restless (2013)

Singles from Exposed
- 1. "Goodbye" Released: April 7, 2009; 2. "Sabotage" Released: August 18, 2009; 3. "Future Love" Released: November 10, 2009

Exposed is the debut studio album by American singer Kristinia DeBarge, released on July 28, 2009 by Island Records and Sodapop Records. Its music incorporates pop and R&B styles. The album debuted at number 23 on the US Billboard 200 with 16,539 copies sold the first week. DeBarge began recording the album in 2008, and had been writing the album since 2006. The album features production and writing from the likes of Babyface and OneRepublic frontman Ryan Tedder among others.

The album spawned three different singles. The first of these singles, titled "Goodbye" has become DeBarge's biggest hit to date. The song reached the Top 20 in the Hot 100, Canada, as well as the Australian Hitseekers Chart. It also charted fairly well in countries such as Sweden. The second single was "Sabotage", which was released on August 18, 2009. Originally, the song was to be released along with "Future Love", however, those plans were scrapped, and "Sabotage" became the stand-alone second single. Despite the success of her previous single, "Sabotage" failed to chart on any chart worldwide. The third single, "Future Love" (featuring rapper Pitbull), was released on November 10, 2009. The single became her second consecutive single to miss out on the Billboard Hot 100 singles chart, however, it did peak at number 25 on the Bubbling Under Hot 100 singles chart.

Exposed received generally positive reviews from music critics, based on an aggregate score of 69/100 from Metacritic. The album received positive reviews from major critical websites, such as Blues & Soul, People Magazine, and AllMusic. On December 15, 2009, a deluxe edition of the album was released only on iTunes, in an attempt to boost album sales. The deluxe edition features two remixes of "Goodbye" and "Sabotage", as well as the music video for the two songs. However, the deluxe edition failed to raise album sales, selling only 1,000 copies in its first week.

== Background ==
With great variations between track themes, namely from the pain of breaking up in "Cried Me A River" to the excitement of falling in love in "Doesn't Everybody Want To Fall In Love", DeBarge has a personal connection to each song on the album:

"I want to show people that they're not alone... I hurt, I get scared, I get nervous and I'm not always at my best – but I try my best. I'm not perfect. I make mistakes and that's okay."

The album includes two songs which DeBarge wrote herself: "Cried Me a River" and "It's Gotta Be Love". Other notable credits go to songwriter and producer Ryan Tedder, who is best known for crafting Leona Lewis' worldwide number one "Bleeding Love", Beyoncé Knowles's top 5 hit "Halo" and Jordin Sparks' top 10 hit "Battlefield". For this album he co-wrote and produced "Speak Up" as well as the single "Future Love", previously recorded and released in 2008 by American boyband Varsity Fanclub. Kenneth "Babyface" Edmonds made the biggest contribution having worked on four songs: "Cried Me a River", "Doesn't Everybody Want to Fall in Love", "It's Gotta Be Love" and "Disconnect".

DeBarge began singing when she was 3 years old, but did not begin to take it seriously until she was 12. When she was 12, her father took her into a recording studio. They worked until 4 am recording a duet, which made her father realize that she was serious about beginning a singing career. During the summer of 2003, DeBarge was a contestant on the American Idol spin-off, American Juniors. DeBarge progressed to the semi-final round of twenty contestants. She was featured in the first group of ten semi-finalists and sang the song "Reflection" from the Disney movie Mulan. However, she was not one of the five to progress from that group into the final ten. Due to her performance on the show, several producers began to consider DeBarge to be added to their label. At 14, DeBarge was introduced to Kenneth "Babyface" Edmonds. She worked with him for five years and, two days before her nineteenth birthday, signed to a new division of Island Def Jam Records founded by Edmonds and Jeff Burroughs called Sodapop Records, and immediately began working on Exposed.

== Composition ==
The music found on Exposed is primarily R&B, as well as pop and dance. Lyrically, the album deals mainly with the topics of romance. The first track on the album, "Somebody", features DeBarge singing about how she got over her ex, and has now found someone better. Throughout the song, she talks of how good it feels "to be loved by somebody". The second track, "Future Love", features DeBarge singing of a love that will occur in the future. "Speak Up", the third track on the album, is a slowed down ballad that features DeBarge singing to her lover, telling him to "speak up" and tell her what his problems are. Throughout the song, she urges him to "speak up, because the silence is killing me". "Goodbye" is the fourth song on the album. The single sees DeBarge singing to her recently ex-boyfriend and tells him that she's over him, and has her "single girl swag". The song also talks of DeBarge partying with her friends and finding a new man, in an attempt to get back at him. "Sabotage", the fifth song on the album, strays from the topic of love that was in all of the previous tracks. The song deals with DeBarge's "bad side" coming out, as she struggles to be the good girl everyone wants her to be. The sixth song on the album, "Died In Your Eyes", features DeBarge singing about how she knows her boyfriend has lied to her. The song speaks of the awkward silence that follows her discovery of this event. Although it is not stated in the song, it is presumably about an unfaithful boyfriend. "Powerless" is the seventh track Exposed, and lyrically speaks of DeBarge's ex who feels he is on top of the world. The song speaks of DeBarge informing him that "it's about to be lights out", and she's going to "leave you powerless". The eighth song on the album, "Cried Me a River", plays on the phrase "Cry Me a River", that influenced songs by artist such as Justin Timberlake, among others. The lyrics of the song show DeBarge singing about how she "cried me a river" and got over her ex-boyfriend. The ninth song to be featured on Exposed is "Doesn't Everybody Wanna Fall In Love". Lyrically, the song speaks of DeBarge's longing for someone to love her, and she questions "Doesn't Everybody Wanna Fall In Love?". "It's Gotta Be Love" is the tenth song on the album, and features DeBarge singing about the many emotions her lover makes her feel, and declares that she is in love with him. "Disconnect" is the final track on the album, and shows a different side of DeBarge not heard on the album. The song shows DeBarge singing about how much she misses her ex, and she doesn't think she can make it without him. The song is a turn-around of the previous tracks heard on the album, which mostly dealt with getting over a boyfriend, or being in love with someone.

== Promotion ==
DeBarge chose to promote the album mainly through live performances. DeBarge appeared on Live With Regis and Kelly to perform "Goodbye". The same single was also performed live on The Wendy Williams Show. During both performances, DeBarge was accompanied by several female back-up dancers. On June 18, the single was performed yet again on the reality dancing competition, So You Think You Can Dance The performance was met with mixed reviews, mainly due to the fact that DeBarge had lip-synced her way through the song. Oh No They Didn't mocked the performance. Neon Limelight praised the dancing performed during the performance, however, they were not thrilled with the lip-syncing, stating "It's just a major shame she did not perform the song live. The obvious lip syncing took some of the excitement away from the performance, which was cool and fun overall." DeBarge also began performing live in several stores and at city fairs, performing songs such as "Speak Up" and "Future Love". At several of these shows, the ballads from the album were performed acoustically, with DeBarge singing along with one man playing a guitar behind her. DeBarge also performed several songs from the album at Jingle Ball 2009. During the performances, DeBarge had male back-up dancers in the background.

Aside from network appearances, DeBarge also opened up for pop singer Britney Spears, during her 2009 world tour, The Circus Starring: Britney Spears. Before starting the tour, DeBarge stated "Joining Britney Spears for her Circus tour will be an amazing and surreal experience for me," she said posted on Spears' site. "I have been dreaming of an opportunity like this forever, and can't wait." During the shows (DeBarge opened up for all of the North American shows) DeBarge performed "Goodbye", along with "Sabotage" and "Future Love". Debarge also appeared on Hollywood's Moofaces Tv during live show on Aug 4, 2009.

== Singles ==
"Goodbye" was released digitally on April 7, 2009, and was released for airplay on April 28. The single was met with generally positive reception upon its release. Goodbye was also met with commercial success in the US as well as in the international music market. In the United States, the single debuted at number 75 on the Billboard Hot 100 singles chart, and later reached a peak of number 15 on the chart. The song was also a hit on the Dance Music charts in the US, where it reached a peak of No. 3 on the Billboard Hot Dance Club Play singles chart. Goodbye later went on to peak at number 90 on the Hot 100 Year End Chart. Outside of the US, the single performed moderately well. In Australia, the single failed to impact the main singles chart. However, it did reach a height of 16 on the Hitseekers chart, as well as number 41 on the Australian Airplay singles chart. In Sweden, the single rose to a peak of 26 on the official singles chart. The single was also a success in Canada, where it reached a peak of number 15 on the Canadian Hot 100. Initially, the second single from the album was set to be a double A-side release of "Sabotage" and "Future Love". However, plans for this were scrapped, and "Sabotage" would go on to be the second single from the album.

"Sabotage" was released as the second single from Exposed on August 18, 2009. A music video was released to promote the song on August 19, 2009. The single was met with positive reviews from critics, but commercially the single suffered, mostly due to lack of promotion. "Sabotage" is considered a commercial failure, as it failed to chart on any chart worldwide. The song did not receive a release in the United Kingdom. "Future Love" was released as the third US single on November 10, and as the second single in the UK on November 2, 2009. A remix has been made featuring rapper Pitbull, and the song has charted at number 25 on the Bubbling Under Hot 100 in the US.

== Critical reception ==
Professional ratings
Review scores
Source	Rating
AllMusic	3.5/5 stars
Entertainment Weekly	B
Newsday	B+
Rolling Stone	3/5 stars
People	3/4 stars
Los Angeles Times	2.5/4 stars

Exposed received generally positive reviews from music critics. AllMusic writes "Through and through, Exposed is an album directed at older tweens and teens, and it does tend to act its age, never presenting DeBarge as someone pretending to be any more wise or worldly than the average 19-year-old. Some of the material could use a shot of personality, but DeBarge is too relatable to deny. And though her voice has yet to fully develop and lacks the uniqueness running through her bloodline, it's clear she landed a major-label contract on the basis of her talent. Entertainment Weekly writes, "the featherweight kiss-off "Goodbye", which cannily samples one-off wonder Steam's 1969 sports-stadium staple, "Na Na Hey Hey Kiss Him Goodbye". It likely helped the 19-year-old land a gig opening for Britney Spears' Circus tour beginning this August, though Exposed's airy, girlish pop – especially cotton-candy Casio grooves like "Future Love" and "Died in Your Eyes" – mostly recalls the female stars of her dad's era: Lisa Lisa and Cult Jam, Paula Abdul, and (coincidence?) Exposé.

Blues & Soul felt that Exposed "showcases the teenage Ms. DeBarge's personal journey of self-discovery through a variety of musical moods," while Newsday found that "DeBarge comes across as a streetwise Jordin Sparks with the stomping smash "Goodbye" and the new, more dance-oriented Rihanna-esque single "Sabotage". But what really sets her apart are the first-rate ballads that she flutters across [...] Exposed really does unveil DeBarge, who's set to open for Britney Spears this fall, as a complete package and a music marketer's dream – a teenager who can sing grown-up songs and make them feel young, and feel comfortable with everything from hip-hop to Celine Dion ballads. Her wait to break into the public eye is about to be so totally worth it". People praised DeBarge's album as "a winning debut, fresh and seemingly sun-kissed, makes her this summer's answer to Rihanna. The two share a similar vocal timbre and the same pop charms." Digital Spy praised DeBarge on a good first impression, though lacking top-notch material, writing: "Her girlish vocals are committed and surprisingly soulful, only slipping into stage schooly mannerisms occasionally [...] She shows real glimpses of potential here, and having spent five years together already, it's safe to presume that DeBarge and her mentor are in it for the long haul."

== Commercial performance ==
Commercially, Exposed has not been as successful as the lead single. In the US, the album debuted at number 23 on the Billboard 200, and at number 14 on the Top Digital Albums chart. Exposed sold 16,539 copies in its first week of release. Despite a moderately successful start, the album quickly began descending the charts, and only spent a total of six weeks on the Billboard 200.

== Track listing ==
Exposed track listing
No.	Title	Writer(s)	Producer(s)	Length
1.	"Somebody"	Ursula Yancy; Melvin Hough II; Rivelino Wouter	Mel & Mus	3:26
2.	"Future Love"	Evan "Kidd" Bogart; Ryan Tedder	Skins; The Jam^{[a]}	3:23
3.	"Speak Up"	Bogart; Tedder	Tedder; The Jam^{[a]}	3:42
4.	"Goodbye"	Eric Dawkins; Gary DeCarlo; Antonio Dixon; Dale Frashuer; Paul Leka; Adonis Shropshire; Damon Thomas	The Pentagon; Babyface	3:27
5.	"Sabotage"	Bogart; Michael Mani; Erika Nuri-Taylor; Jordan Omley; David "DQ" Quinones	The Jam	3:12
6.	"Died in Your Eyes"	Dean "Inflo" Josiah; Pamela Sheyne; Rune Westberg	Westberg; Sheyne; Inflo; The Jam^{[a]}	3:46
7.	"Powerless"	Troy Johnson; Tynisha Keli; Mani; Omley	Radio; The Jam	3:41
8.	"Cried Me a River"	Kenneth Edmonds; Ronnie Walton	Babyface; Preach	4:21
9.	"Doesn't Everybody Want to Fall in Love"	Kristinia DeBarge; Edmonds; Dwayne Simmons; Walton	Babyface; Preach	3:40
10.	"It's Gotta Be Love"	DeBarge; Edmonds; Anthony M. Jones; Roy "Royalty" Hamilton; Bobby Ervin; Steven Ettinger; Darryl Pierce; Simmons; James Smith	Babyface	3:07
11.	"Disconnect"	Edmonds; Walton	Babyface; Jon John Robinson^{[b]}	4:01

Digital deluxe edition bonus tracks
No.	Title	Length
12.	"Goodbye" (Mike Rizzo Funk Generation Radio Edit)	2:58
13.	"Sabotage" (Cajjimere Ray Pop Radio Edit)	3:42

US iTunes Store deluxe edition bonus video
No.	Title	Length
14.	"Goodbye"	3:28

International iTunes Store deluxe edition bonus video
No.	Title	Length
15.	"Sabotage"	3:25

Notes

- ^{^[a]} denotes additional producer(s)
- ^{^[c]} denotes co-producer(s)

Sample credits

- "Goodbye" contains elements from "Na Na Hey Hey Kiss Him Goodbye" as performed by Steam.
- "It's Gotta Be Love" contains an interpolation from "I Need Love."

== Personnel ==
Credits for Exposed adapted from Allmusic

- E. Kidd Bogart – composer
- Paul Boutin – engineer
- Ravaughn Brown – vocals
- Tara Bryan – A&R
- Kenneth "Babyface" Edmonds – bass, drum programming, executive producer, acoustic guitar, instrumentation, keyboards, producer
- Stephen Ferrera – A&R
- Serban Ghenea – mixing
- Daria Hines – stylist
- Kim Lumpkin – A&R
- Mike Mani – keyboards, producer, programming, vocal producer
- Jared Newcomb – assistant
- Jordan Omley – keyboards, producer, programming, vocal producer
- Herb Powers – mastering
- Tim Roberts – assistant
- J. Peter Robinson – art direction, design
- Gabriela Schwartz – marketing
- Pamela Sheyne – producer
- Andrew Southam – photography
- Ryan Tedder – arranger, musician, producer
- Rune Westberg – engineer, musician, producer
- Joe Zook – engineer
- Andy Zulla – mixing
- Jon-John Robinson – drum programming, keyboards, producer

== Charts ==
Weekly chart performance for Exposed
Chart (2009)	Peak position
US Billboard 200	23
US Top Digital Albums	14

== Release history ==
Exposed release history
Region	Date	Label	Ref(s)
United States	July 28, 2009	Sodapop Records	
United Kingdom	August 17, 2009	Interscope Records	
Poland	October 16, 2009	Universal Music	
