= Snowballers Entertainment =

US record label and entertainment company

- Founded: 2011
- Founder: Ray Kay
- Genre: Pop, Dance, Urban
- Country of origin: United States
- Location: New York City, New York
- Official website: Snowballersentertainment.com

Snowballers Entertainment is an American record label and entertainment company based in New York City founded by the award-winning music video director Ray Kay and the Norwegian music producer Axident. The record label develops artists with an emphasis on pop, urban and dance music.

== Signed artists ==
- Slimmie Hendrix
- Tokyo Diiva

== See also ==
- Slimmie Hendrix
- Ray Kay
