= Pittsburgh Slim =

American rapper

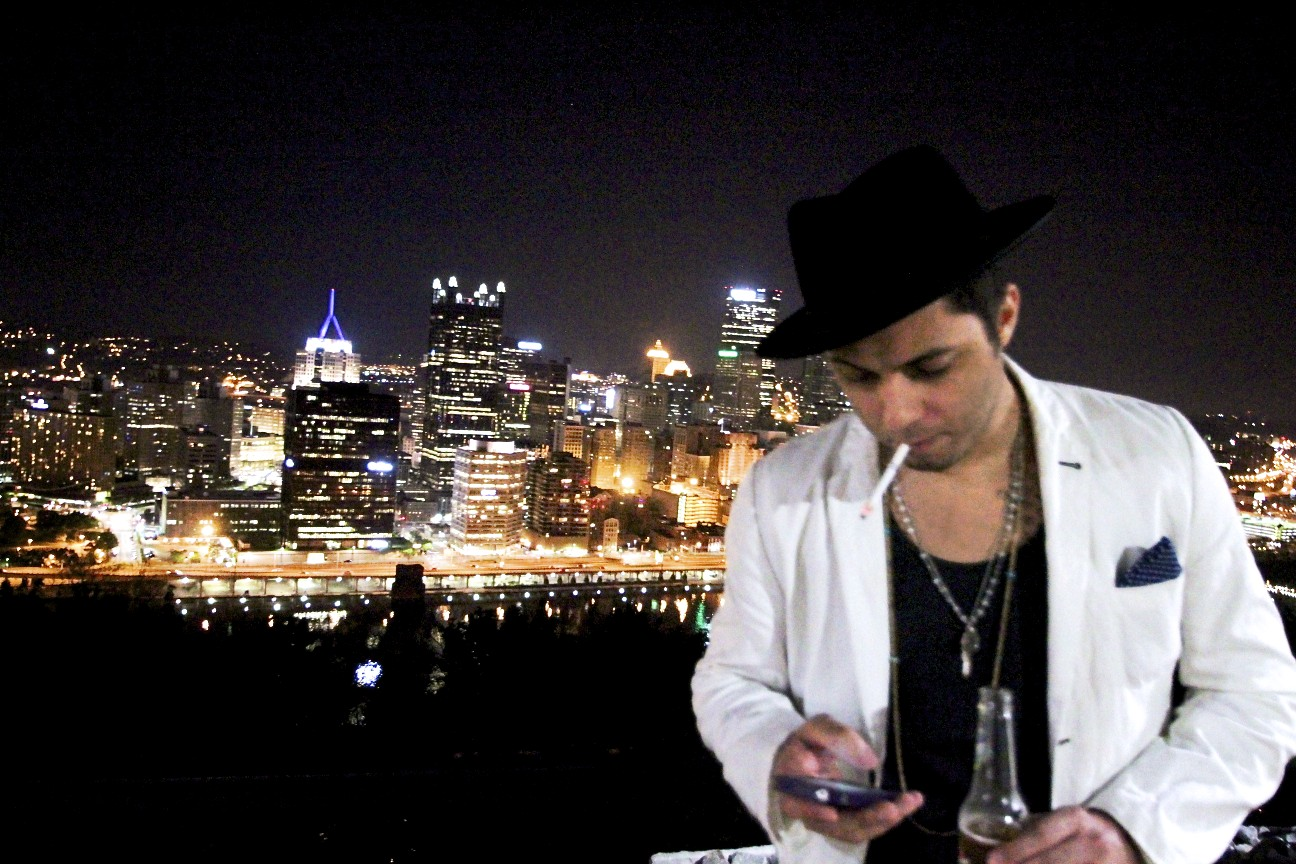
- Pittsburgh Slim in 2012

Background information
- Also known as: Slimmie Hendrix / Slimmie / Pittsburgh Slim/Suka Dong
- Born: Sied Chahrour
- Origin: Pittsburgh, Pennsylvania, U.S.
- Genres: Hip hop, pop, dance
- Occupations: Rapper, actor
- Years active: 2007–present
- Label: Snowballers Entertainment 2011–present. Def Jam 2007–2008
- Website: www.slimmiehendrix.com

Sied Chahrour, better known by his stage names Pittsburgh Slim and later as Slimmie and Slimmie Hendrix is an American rapper from Pittsburgh, Pennsylvania, United States, of mixed Algerian and Mexican origins. Previously signed to Def Jam Recordings as Pittsburgh Slim (until 2009), he is now signed to Snowballers Entertainment with his new adopted name Slimmie Hendrix.

== Biography ==
Chahrour was born and raised in the Greenfield neighborhood of Pittsburgh, Pennsylvania, to an Algerian father and a part-Mexican mother. He began working on rap music while attending Allderdice High School. He played in guitar in rock bands and had a strong presence in the local rap community, working the likes of producer E. Dan and rapper Wiz Khalifa. He opened many local shows for artists such as Nelly, Jurassic 5, Usher, Nas, The Roots, Ja Rule and 50 Cent.

Chahrour relocated to Los Angeles, California and worked as a waiter while he continued to pursue music. Chahrour conceived of a song based on the line "I like when girls kiss girls", and turned to North Carolina-based producer David Willis, also known as Ski Beatz, for help with the production. For the song, "Girls Kiss Girls", they made a music video featuring Penthouse magazine model Krista Ayne, inspired by a scene from the 1999 film American Pie. The video became a sensation on the video sharing website YouTube and the song started to get played on radio stations across the U.S., beginning with KISS-FM in Pittsburgh.

Chahrour began receiving offers from record labels to release the single, but held out for an offer to make an album. Chahrour met with rapper and Def Jam Recordings CEO Jay-Z, and was offered a five-album deal with the label. Chahrour had come up with the name Pittsburgh Slim four years earlier, based on a line from Jay-Z's song, "So Ghetto" from Vol. 3... Life and Times of S. Carter, where he rapped "Iceberg, Slim, baby ride rims", referencing author and pimp Iceberg Slim.

Chahrour released the single "Girls Kiss Girls". The song gained popularity from its video on YouTube, leading Jay-Z to sign him to Def Jam Recordings on a 5-album deal, where he released his solo debut LP, Tastemaker (EP), on 4 December 2007 Chahrour appeared on Last Call with Carson Daly on December 11, 2007 and appeared in the film The Bleeding where he appeared in the role of Crash. The film starred Vinnie Jones, Michael Matthias, Michael Madsen, DMX and Armand Assante. Chahrour left Def Jam in late 2008. Mostly known for his sexually-explicit lyrics, he released the single "My Bitch is Crazy" from the Bleeding soundtrack through the iTunes Store in January 2009. His mixtape "Nolita Nights" was released in August, 2009. These works were all credited to his stage name Pittsburgh Slim.

He came back in 2011 under a new stage name Slimmie Hendrix with the album Steezington Ave that includes collaborations with DJ Adam 12, Tony Adams, Dirt Nasty, Tekneek and Axident.

== Discography ==
=== As Pittsburgh Slim ===
LPs

- 2007: Tastemaker (EP), Def Jam Recordings - debut LP

Singles

- 2007: "Girls Kiss Girls", Def Jam
- 2009: "My Bitch is Crazy", Now City Productions
- 2019: “Do You Ever Stop and Smell the Roses?”, Self-Released
- 2019: ”A Guide to Life”, Self-Released
- 2019: ”Strung out on Electricity”; Self-Released

Mixtapes

- 2007: Downtown Wednesday Night
- 2009: Nolita Nights
- 2012: Pittsburgh Slim's Excellent Adventure
- 2013: And The Beat Goes On...
- 2013: Instaglam

=== As Slimmie Hendrix ===
LPs

- 2011: Steezington Ave, Snowballers Entertainment

Singles

- 2011: "The Skinny Bitches Have More Fun"

== Filmography ==
Year	Title	Role
2009	The Bleeding	Crash

== See also ==
- Wiz Khalifa
- Ke$ha
- Jay-Z
- Ray Kay
- Ski Beatz
- Camp Lo
