= Winta =

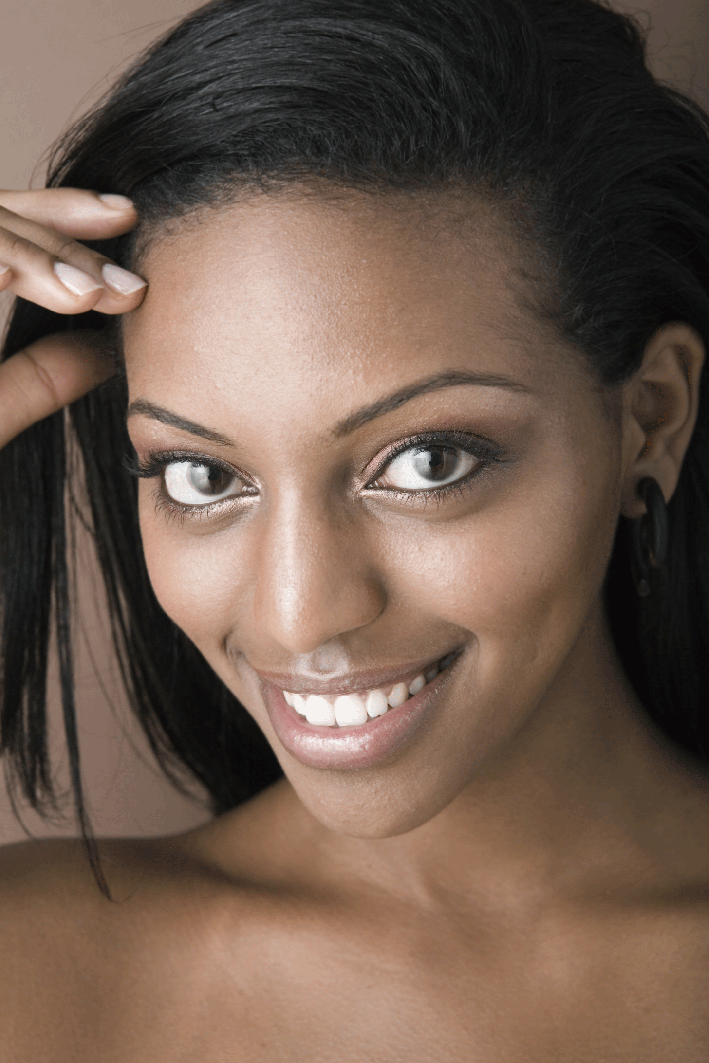
- Winta Efrem Negassi

Background information
- Born: Winta Efrem
- Origin: Oslo, Norway
- Genre: R&B
- Occupation: Singer-songwriter
- Years active: 2002–present
- Label: daWorks Records

Winta Efrem Negassi (born 20 March 1984) is a Norwegian R&B musician from Oslo, Norway. She grew up in Oslo, Norway. Winta has had an interest in music since childhood.

Winta's debut album was released in May 2004. From 2002 to 2004, she made three music videos for the singles "Emotions", "Hot Romance (Rok With You)" and "I Want U", all of those directed by Norwegian Ray Kay. Released in 2004, her hit single "Hot Romance (Rok With You)" was written by UK musician Taio Cruz.

On 9 September 2011, Winta released a second studio album after a seven-year hiatus. The album, titled "My Life", included popular tracks such as "Top of the World", "Nails on a Chalkboard", "My Life", "Heart on Fire (Merry-Go-Round)", "Amazes Me", "Just For Tonight", "Storm in Paradise" and "No Last Regrets".

== Discography ==
=== Singles ===
- "Emotions" (daWorks, 2002)
- "Emotions (Remix)" (daWorks, 2002) featuring Diaz
- "Trippin'" (daWorks, 2003) featuring Aphletik
- "Julekveldsvise" (daWorks, 2003) duet with Maria Arredondo, from the album Nå har vi vaske golvet – Sanger av Alf Prøysen
- "I Want U" (daWorks, 2004)
- "Hot Romance (Rok Wit You)" (daWorks, 2004) featuring Anton Gordon
- "Teaser" (daWorks, 2005)
- "Good Times (Hitesh Remix)" (daWorks, 2005)
- "Top of the World" (daWorks, 2007)
- "Nails on a Chalkboard" (daWorks, 2010)
- "My Life" (daWorks, 2011)
- "Heart on Fire (Merry-Go-Round)" (daWorks, 2011)
- "Amazes Me" (daWorks, 2011)
- "Just For Tonight" (daWorks, 2011)
- "Storm in Paradiset" (daWorks, 2012)
- "No Last Regrets" (daWorks, 2012)
- "Not Afraid" (daWorks, 2013)
- "Drip" featuring Johnel (daWorks, 2013)
- "Vibes" SVON & Winta (Oslo Records, 2026)

=== Albums ===
- "First" (daWorks – 2004)
- "My Life" (daWorks – 2011)

== Reception ==
An Adressa reviewer described Winta's album as "something too long" and "a hint of something great about to come". Her single "Emotions" was a radio hit and her other single "Trippin" became a minor radio hit.
