= Goodbye (Kristinia DeBarge song) =

Single by Kristinia DeBarge

from the album Exposed
- Released: April 7, 2009
- Recorded: 2008
- Genre: Dance-pop, electropop
- Length: 3:28
- Label: Soda Pop, Island
- Songwriters: Eric Dawkins, Gary DeCarlo, Antonio Dixon, Dale Frashuer, Paul Leka, Adonis Shropshire, Damon Thomas
- Producers: Babyface, Dylan Saibic

Kristinia DeBarge singles chronology
"Goodbye" (2009)	"Sabotage" (2009)

Audio sample
- file; help

"Goodbye" is the first single released by the American recording artist Kristinia DeBarge from her first studio album Exposed. It was released digitally in the United States on April 7, 2009, to US radio on April 28, 2009, and in the UK on August 10, 2009. The song contains a sample of Steam's "Na Na Hey Hey Kiss Him Goodbye". An uptempo dance pop track, the lyrics of the song deal with DeBarge getting over her ex-boyfriend. A music video was released to promote the song, which features DeBarge and her friends stealing her ex-boyfriend's car and driving to various locations, including a house party. Throughout the video, DeBarge is seen flirting with several men in an attempt to get back at her ex-boyfriend.

Despite the mixed critical reception, it achieved some commercial success, peaking in the top forty in Sweden and the top twenty in Canada and the United States, but it fared better as a dance single, peaking at number three on Billboard's Hot Dance Club Songs chart. Despite the minimal chart performance of the single, it has become her biggest hit to date, as well as her only single to chart on the Billboard Hot 100 in the US.

"Goodbye" was one of the first songs that was recorded for the album. During an interview with TheStarScoop, DeBarge said of the first time she heard the song on the radio,

"I was screaming up and down. I was actually at home and listening to New York Radio Online. I had called all my friends, telling them to listen. My mom video taped me. It was really surreal for me. Every time I hear my song on the radio, I just take it in and [it's] so cool. It’s me!"

== Reception ==
=== Critical reception ===
"Goodbye" is generally considered a pop-dance track. J!-ENT described the song as "an upbeat, addictive track utilizing the classic 1969 Steam track “Na Na Hey Hey Kiss Him Goodbye”. A wonderful debut single for Kristinia." People magazine praised the song and compared it to recent releases by Rihanna, stating "First single 'Goodbye', an undeniable dance-pop confection, recalls Rihanna's 'S.O.S. (Rescue Me)', reworking Steam's 1969 hit 'Na Na Hey Hey Kiss Him Goodbye' much like 'S.O.S. (Rescue Me)' did 'Tainted Love'." Meanwhile, upon the song's UK release, noted R&B writer Pete Lewis of the 'Blues & Soul' referred to it as "a punchy, upbeat single whose hook prominently samples the familiar hook from Steam's 1969 American Number One 'Na Na Hey Hey Kiss Him Godbye'". Nick Levine of Digital Spy said, "Like a low calorie chocolate bar, 'Goodbye' is sweet enough in the moment, but it doesn't have enough substance to leave you feeling really satisfied."

Glenn Gamboa of Newsday said that "DeBarge comes across as a streetwise Jordin Sparks on the "stomping smash". People called the song "an undeniable dance-pop confection". Time said that the song is "so enjoyably trashy, it's a wonder no one thought of it before."

"Goodbye" received generally mixed reviews from critics. Commonsensemedia praised the song, stating "It's quite a feat to breathe new life into a song that has taken on such a life of its own. But DeBarge is able to make this song uniquely her own and put a funky dance twist on a classic. This young singer appears to have inherited the family talent for mass-appeal music with an easygoing style." Digital Spy said of the single, "Honestly, you wait years for someone to sample the hook from 'Na Na Hey Hey Kiss Him Goodbye', and then everyone does it at once! It backs Wale and Lady GaGa on 'Chillin', Jay-Z uses it to shoo off pop's most controversial vocal effect on 'D.O.A. (Death of Auto-Tune)', and here's US newbie Kristinia DeBarge swallowing it whole on her debut single. Blame it on the over-familiarity of the sample, or maybe the fact that DeBarge nicks a trick from Rihanna's 'SOS (Rescue Me)' here, but the result isn't quite the pop smash it could be. The crux of the issue? Like a low calorie chocolate bar, 'Goodbye' is sweet enough in the moment, but it doesn't have enough substance to leave you feeling really satisfied."

HeavenlyReviews praised the song as well, stating ""Goodbye", this song is one of those strong anthem breakup songs that the rhythm just kinds gets stuck in your head and for the next seven days you will be singing this song, humming this song, and thinking about this song." Bisaidso were very critical of DeBarge, commenting "Damn, we can't go five years without a new DeBarge trying to break into the music biz, can we? Her debut album (written and produced by Babyface) should out this summer. Let’s hope young Kristinia doesn't end up with a rap sheet like some of her family members."

=== Commercial performance ===
Goodbye was met with commercial success in the US as well as in the international music market. In the United States, the single debuted at number 75 on the Billboard Hot 100 singles chart, and later reached a peak of number 15 on the chart. The song was also a hit on the Dance Music charts in the US, where it reached a peak of 3 on the Billboard Hot Dance Club Play singles chart. Goodbye later went on to peak at number 96 on the Hot 100 Year End Chart. Outside of the US, the single performed moderately well. In Australia, the single failed to impact the main singles chart. However, it did reach a height of 16 on the Hitseekers chart, as well as number 41 on the Australian Airplay singles chart. In Sweden, the single rose to a peak of 26 on the official singles chart. The single was also a success in Canada, where it reached a peak of number 15 on the Canadian Hot 100. The song also charted in Brazil's dance chart and peaked at #13.

== Live performances ==
DeBarge chose to promote the album mainly through live performances. She appeared on So You Think You Can Dance and Live With Regis and Kelly to perform "Goodbye". The same single was also performed live on the Wendy Williams Show. During both performances, DeBarge was accompanied by several female back-up dancers. DeBarge also began performing live in several stores and at city fairs, performing songs such as "Speak Up" and "Future Love". At several of these shows, the ballads from the album were performed acoustically, with DeBarge singing along with one man playing a guitar behind her. DeBarge also performed several songs from the album at Jingle Ball 2009. During the performances, DeBarge had male back-up dancers in the background.

Aside from network appearances, DeBarge also opened up for pop singer Britney Spears, during her 2009 world tour, The Circus Starring: Britney Spears. Before starting the tour, DeBarge stated "Joining Britney Spears for her Circus tour will be an amazing and surreal experience for me," she said in a statement posted on Spears' site. "I have been dreaming of an opportunity like this forever, and can't wait." During the shows (DeBarge opened up for all of the North American shows) DeBarge performed "Goodbye", along with "Sabotage" and "Future Love".

== Music video ==
A music video, directed by Ray Kay, was released to promote the song. It starts with DeBarge and her friends watching her ex-boyfriend park his car, which they then steal after he leaves it. DeBarge then flirts with several other men, including those she meets while at a restaurant and bicycling on a sidewalk, and enters their numbers into her cell phone. She is then seen at a house party, dancing around with party-goers. At the end of the video, her ex-boyfriend attends the party. When she sees him, she gives him the peace sign with her fingers and leaves.

During an interview with Seventeen magazine, DeBarge said of the video,

"It's young, fun, and sexy. It starts off with me and my girlfriends just being mischievous. We're checking out whether my ex-boyfriend is home, because we're about to steal his car. The car in the video is a 1996 convertible Mustang, and it's red! I had to get a classic in there, since a new car is just what you'd expect. I worked out really hard to be in good shape for the video, too. My best friend is in the passenger seat with me, and everyone at the house are my friends. It gives the video more energy."

The video was met with generally positive reviews. NeonLimeLight said of the video, "Everybody wants a nice fling for the summer, but when you can't have love, what's better than a little revenge? Hot newcomer Kristinia DeBarge knows all about that. In the video for her smokin’ hot debut single, “Goodbye,” Kristinia gets her ex where it hurts the most by stealing his car with a few friends to ride around town and scope out potential replacements. She caps off her day of sun and fun by throwing a packed house party. “Single girl swag” is what she calls it. So check the video for what's sure to become the anthem of the summer for the single ladies!"

== Track listing ==
Remixes released July 7, 2009

1. Goodbye [DJ PAULO Club Mix]
2. Goodbye [Mike Rizzo Funk Generation Dub (Vinyl Edit)]
3. Goodbye [Hott 22 Dub (Vinyl Edit)]

US Promo Remixes

1. Goodbye (Album Version) 3:29
2. Goodbye (Mike Rizzo Funk Generation Radio Edit) 2:58
3. Goodbye (Hott 22 Radio Edit) 3:26
4. Goodbye (DJ PAULO Radio Edit) 4:20
5. Goodbye (Mike Rizzo Funk Generation Club) 6:41
6. Goodbye (Hott 22 Club) 6:48
7. Goodbye (DJ PAULO Club Mix) 7:56
8. Goodbye (Mike Rizzo Funk Generation Dub) 6:08
9. Goodbye (Hott 22 Dub) 6:48
10. Goodbye (DJ PAULO DUB) 7:33

UK Promo CD

1. Goodbye (Album Version) 3:29
2. Goodbye (Instrumental) 3:35

== Charts ==
=== Weekly charts ===
Chart (2009)	Peak position
Australia Hitseekers (ARIA)	16
Australian Airplay Chart	41
Belgium (Ultratip Bubbling Under Flanders)	3
Belgium (Ultratip Bubbling Under Wallonia)	17
Canada (Canadian Hot 100)	15
Sweden (Sverigetopplistan)	26
US Billboard Hot 100	15
US Billboard Pop Songs	13
US Billboard Adult Pop Songs	27
US Billboard Hot Dance Club Songs	3

=== Year-end charts ===
Chart (2009)	Position
US Billboard Hot 100	96
US Billboard Hot Dance Club Play	38

== Certifications ==
Region	Certification	Certified units/sales
United States (RIAA)	Platinum	1,000,000^{*}
^{*} Sales figures based on certification alone.

== Release history ==
Region	Date	Format	Label
United States	April 7, 2009	Digital download	Sodapop Records
United States	April 28, 2009	Radio airplay	Sodapop Records
United Kingdom	August 10, 2009	CD single	Island Records
France	October 19, 2009	CD single	Mercury
