= This Time (Melanie C album) =

2007 album by Melanie C

Studio album by Melanie C
- Released: 30 March 2007
- Studios: Rokstone Studios, Olympic Studios, Strongroom, Area 21, The Swamp Studios, Kore Studios and Sleeper Studios (London, UK); Real World Studios (Box, Wiltshire, UK)
- Genres: Pop; pop rock
- Length: 49:43
- Labels: Red Girl; Warner
- Producers: Robin Barter; Guy Chambers; Joel Edwards; Richard Flack; Brian Glover; Stephen Hague; Greg Hatwell; Marc Lane; Steve Mac; Phil Thornalley; Peter Vettese

Melanie C chronology
Beautiful Intentions (2005)	This Time (2007)	The Sea (2011)

Singles from This Time
- 1. "The Moment You Believe" Released: 16 March 2007; 2. "I Want Candy" Released: 26 March 2007; 3. "Carolyna" Released: 8 June 2007; 4. "This Time" Released: 12 October 2007; 5. "Understand" Released: 25 July 2008

This Time is the fourth studio album released by the English singer Melanie C. It was initially released on 30 March 2007 in Germany, Austria, and Switzerland, followed by a wider release in the United Kingdom and other territories on 2 April 2007. The album was developed with a forward-looking thematic focus on the present and future, while continuing Melanie C's pop rock style and drawing on influences from artists such as Coldplay and the Red Hot Chili Peppers. It features collaborations with Guy Chambers, Richard Flack, Stephen Hague, Steve Mac, Phil Thornalley, and Peter Vettese.

The album received mixed reviews from music critics, who were divided over its songwriting, with several praising Melanie C's vocal performance and production but criticising the material as inconsistent. Commercially, This Time continued the trend of Melanie C's releases performing more strongly outside the United Kingdom, achieving greater success in continental Europe, where it peaked at number eight in Switzerland and number 15 in Germany, while also charting in Austria, Portugal, Italy, Sweden, Belgium, and Scotland. It was certified Gold in Switzerland for shipments of 20,000 units.

This Time was supported by several singles released across different territories over an extended period, led by "The Moment You Believe", which achieved moderate success in Central Europe, reaching the top 20 in Switzerland, Austria, and Germany. It was followed by "I Want Candy", a Strangeloves cover release that charted in parts of Europe, while "Carolyna" and "This Time" saw more limited chart performance and "Understand" failed to chart. In further promotion of the album, Melanie C launched the nine-date This Time Canadian Tour in May 2008, beginning in Montreal.

== Background ==
In April 2005, Melanie C released Beautiful Intentions, her third studio album and first on her self-founded label, Red Girl Records, following her departure from Virgin Records. Developed over the course of a year with producer Greg Haver and a range of songwriting collaborators, the album marked a move towards greater artistic independence. It received generally positive reviews from critics, who praised its direction and considered it one of her strongest solo efforts: Commercially, Beautiful Intentions performed modestly in the United Kingdom but achieved significantly greater success across continental Europe, largely driven by the success of "First Day of My Life," which topped the charts in Germany and Portugal and substantially boosted the album's European performance.

Her next project, her fourth studio album, This Time, was developed with a forward-looking thematic approach, with Melanie C describing its lyrical focus as centred on the present and future rather than retrospective reflection, with several tracks exploring topics such as decision-making, personal change, and emotional anticipation. Musically, the material continued the pop rock direction established on her previous solo releases, incorporating influences from artists such as Coldplay and the Red Hot Chili Peppers, alongside classic pop songwriting traditions. The album was recorded with a live band, reinforcing its emphasis on a more organic, performance-oriented sound. Melanie C also described the album as closely connected to her intentions as a live performer, stating that its primary purpose was to support touring and live performance.

== Critical reception ==
Professional ratings
Review scores
Source	Rating
AllMusic	2/5 stars
Digital Spy	2/5 stars
laut.de	2/5 stars
Manchester Evening News	4/5 stars
MusicOMH	2/5 stars

This Time garnered mixed reception from music critics who were divided by the lyrical content feeling undistinguished. Glenn Meads of the Manchester Evening News praised the tracks for showcasing Melanie C's new found maturity and consistent genre versatility in her voice, concluding that its "perfect for anyone fed up with Melua, Jones and other artists who sleep walk their way through each track. At least Melanie sounds like she means it." Talia Kraines of BBC commended the album for having tracks which allowed Melanie C's voice to show emotion, but that it will only appeal to longtime fans than attract new ones. AllMusic's Stephen Thomas Erlewine gave credit to the sleek production and Melanie C's voice showing character and maturity, but found the songs too middling and subpar to notice them yet.

Katja Scherle of laut.de gave a mixed review of This Time, criticising its formulaic pop structure and lack of originality, but noting a few standout tracks that briefly add character and variety. Nick Levine of Digital Spy offered a mixed-to-negative assessment of This Time, arguing that despite Melanie C's strong vocal ability, her solo output remained inconsistent and often lacked entertainment value. He criticised the album's melodramatic tone and uninspired songwriting, and concluded that it compared unfavourably to more engaging pop efforts from her former Spice Girls bandmate Geri Halliwell. Despite praising Melanie C vocal performance and her duet with Adam Argyle, John Murphy of musicOMH described the songs as "bland and forgettable," arguing that they lacked personality and vitality, and concluded that "[i]t's a shame, but this album won’t be the one to propel a Spice Girl back to the top of the charts."

== Commercial performance ==
This Time achieved its strongest commercial performance in continental Europe, peaking at number eight in Switzerland and number 15 in Germany. The album also reached the top 30 in Portugal, peaking at number 21 on the Portuguese Albums Chart, and reached number 26 on the Austrian Albums Chart. It also charted in Sweden, Italy, Belgium, and Scotland. By comparison, it peaked at number 57 on the UK Albums Chart, continuing Melanie C's stronger commercial performance outside her home market. The album was certified Gold by the IFPI Switzerland for shipments of 20,000 units.

== Track listing ==
This Time track listing
No.	Title	Writer(s)	Producer(s)	Length
1.	"Understand"	Melanie Chisholm; Adam Argyle	Steve Mac	3:43
2.	"What If I Stay"	Argyle; Jill Jackson	Stephen Hague	3:17
3.	"Protected"	Chisholm; Guy Chambers; Cathy Dennis	Chambers; Richard Flack	4:37
4.	"This Time"	Argyle	Joel Edwards; Robin Barter	3:32
5.	"Carolyna"	Chisholm; Paul Gendler; Mac	Mac	3:21
6.	"Forever Again"	Argyle; Kevin D Hughes; Lee Groves	Hague	3:37
7.	"Your Mistake"	Chisholm; Argyle	Greg Hatwell; Brian Glover; Marc Lane	3:55
8.	"The Moment You Believe"	Chisholm; Peter-John Vettese	Vettese	3:30
9.	"Don't Let Me Go" (featuring Adam Argyle)	Argyle; Jackson	Hague	3:57
10.	"Immune"	Pete Woodroffe; Charlie Grant; James Bourne	Hague	4:37
11.	"May Your Heart"	Chisholm; Gary Clark	Hague; Clark	3:57
12.	"Out of Time"	Chisholm; Phil Thornalley; Dave Munday	Thornalley	3:47
13.	"I Want Candy"	Richard Gottehrer; Bert Russel; Bob Feidman; Gerald Goldstein	Hague	3:24
Total length:				49:43

Italian and French bonus track
No.	Title	Writer(s)	Producer(s)	Length
14.	"First Day of My Life"	Chambers; Enrique Iglesias	Flack	3:24

Portuguese-Brazilian bonus track
No.	Title	Writer(s)	Producer(s)	Length
13.	"Fragile"	Chisholm; Hatwell	Hatwell	4:03
14.	"I Want Candy"	Gottehrer; Russel; Feidman; Goldstein	Hague	3:24

== Personnel ==
- Melanie C – vocals, backing vocals
- Steve Mac – acoustic piano (1, 5), synthesizers (1, 5), arrangements (1, 5)
- Nick Nasmyth – keyboards (2, 6, 7, 9, 11, 13)
- Guy Chambers – keyboards (3), acoustic piano (3), tack piano (3), Moog bass (3), orchestration (3)
- Richard Flack – programming (3)
- Paul Stanborough – programming (3)
- Robin Barter – keyboards (4), bass guitar (4), string arrangements (4)
- Peter-John Vettese – acoustic piano (8), programming (8), string arrangements (8)
- James Bourne – acoustic piano (10)
- Pete Woodroffe – keyboards (10), drum programming (10)
- David Munday – keyboards (12)
- Phil Thornalley – Mellotron (12), guitars (12), bass (12), drums (12), percussion (12), backing vocals (12)
- Paul Gendler – guitars (1, 4, 5), acoustic guitar (2, 6, 7, 9, 11, 13), electric guitar (2, 6, 7, 9, 11, 13)
- Greg Hatwell – acoustic guitar (2, 6, 7, 9, 11, 13), electric guitar (2, 6, 7, 9, 11, 13)
- Luke Potashnick – guitars (3)
- Joel Edwards – guitars (4), additional backing vocals (4)
- Mark Evans – guitars (8)
- Charlie Grant – acoustic guitar (10), electric guitar (10), bass guitar (10)
- Steve Pearce – bass guitar (1, 5)
- Scott Firth – bass guitar (2, 6, 7, 9, 11, 13)
- Trevor Barry – bass guitar (3)
- Mark Richardson – drums (1, 5)
- Vinnie Lammi – drums (2, 6, 7, 9, 11, 13)
- Ian Thomas – drums (3)
- Ralph Salmins – drums (4)
- Chris Laws – percussion (1, 5)
- Tchad Blake – harmonica (2)
- Ben Lee – violin (4)
- Ian Burdge – cello (7)
- The Scintilla Strings – strings (8)
- Simon Clarke – saxophones (13)
- Roddy Lorimer – trumpets (13)
- Amy Crowther – backing vocals (3)
- Gary Nuttall – backing vocals (3)
- Adam Argyle – vocals (9)
- Lizzy Pattinson – backing vocals (10)
- Charlotte Aggett – backing vocals (11)

=== Production ===
- Morgan Nelson – A&R consultant
- Bob Cunningham – international consultant
- Ian Ross – artwork, design
- Lorenzo Agius – cover photography, booklet photography
- Al Kepenek – booklet photography
- Jo Eastgate – management
- Nancy Phillips – management
- Chai "Ying" Yao – personal assistant to Melanie C

Technical credits

- Tony Cousins – mastering at Metropolis Studios (London, UK)
- Chris Laws – engineer (1, 5)
- Daniel Pursey – engineer (1, 5)
- Chad Chandler – mixing (1, 5)
- Paul Grady – engineer (2, 6, 9, 11, 13), mixing (2, 6, 9, 11, 13)
- Stephen Hague – engineer (2), mixing (6, 9, 11, 13)
- Richard Flack – engineer (3), mixing (3)
- Mark Evans – mixing (4, 7, 8, 10), engineer (8)
- Phil Thornalley – engineer (12), mixing (12)

== Charts ==
Weekly chart performance for This Time
Chart (2007)	Peak position
Austrian Albums (Ö3 Austria)	26
Belgian Albums (Ultratop Flanders)	92
German Albums (Offizielle Top 100)	15
Italian Albums (FIMI)	77
Portuguese Albums (AFP)	21
Scottish Albums (Official Charts)	66
Swedish Albums (Sverigetopplistan)	48
Swiss Albums (Schweizer Hitparade)	8
UK Albums (Official Charts)	57

== Certifications and sales ==
Certifications for This Time
Region	Certification	Certified units/sales
Switzerland (IFPI Switzerland)	Gold	20,000^{^}
^{^} Shipments figures based on certification alone.

== Release history ==
This Time release history
Region	Date	Format	Label	Ref(s)
Germany	30 March 2007	CD; cassette	Red Girl; Warner	
United Kingdom	2 April 2007	CD; cassette	Red Girl; Warner	
Canada	8 April 2008	CD; cassette	Red Girl; Warner	
Brazil	2 November 2009	CD; cassette	Red Girl; Warner	
Argentina	1 December 2011	CD; cassette	Red Girl; Warner	
