= This Time (Melanie C song) =

2007 single by Melanie C

Single by Melanie C

from the album This Time
- B-side: "Understand"; "We Love to Entertain You"
- Released: 12 October 2007
- Length: 3:27
- Label: Red Girl
- Songwriter: Adam Argyle
- Producer: Peter-John Vettese

Melanie C singles chronology
"Carolyna" (2007)	"This Time" (2007)	"Understand" (2008)

Music video
- "This Time" on YouTube

"This Time" is a song by British singer-songwriter Melanie C. It was written by Adam Argyle and produced by Peter-John Vettese for her same-titled fourth studio album (2007). The song was released by Red Girl Records as the album's fourth and final single on 12 October 2007 in Germany, Switzerland and Austria and on October 22, 2007 in the United Kingdom. Melanie C re-recorded the track for a new single version.

== Chart performance ==
In Germany, "This Time" debuted at a number 71 on the German Singles Chart and rose to number 69 in its second week on the chart, becoming the lowest charting single from Melanie C's time on Red Girl Records. The song also debuted and peaked at number 94 on the UK Singles Chart but fell out of the chart in its second week. "This Time" became the lowest charting single of her solo career at the time. It also peaked at number 32 on the Scottish Singles Chart.

== Music video ==
Fliming for the original music video for "This Time" was cancelled in August 2007, due to the death of video director Tim Royes, a frequent collaborator of Melanie C. The video was eventually filmed in September 2007, with the video directed by Royes' friend and fellow director Adrian Moat. The video premiered on September 21, 2007 on Melanie C's official website.

"This Time" starts with Melanie C sitting on a chair with a spotlight directed to her. As she starts singing the chorus of the song, she stands up and follows the light. In the second verse, she is seen lying on the floor and she stands up once again to follow the light. As the bridge of the song starts, Melanie C turns her back on the light and starts running. At the end of the music video, the light fades away as she gets close to the light.

== "We Love to Entertain You" ==
Several single formats of "This Time" feature "We Love to Entertain You" as a bonus track. The song is a reworked version of "We Love," the theme song used for German television network Pro7's 2007 promotional Starforce campaign. In the summer of 2010, there was an online competition for fans to submit a video for the song, and the winner would get their video uploaded onto Melanie C's YouTube channel. The winner was Joana Valentina, while another video was uploaded featuring all the contest entries and a cameo from Chisholm herself at the end.

== Track listings ==
UK maxi single
No.	Title	Writer(s)	Producer(s)	Length
1.	"This Time" (single version)	Adam Argyle	Peter-John Vettese	3:30
2.	"Understand" (alternate version)	Chisholm; Argyle	Stephen Hague	3:52
3.	"We Love to Entertain You"	Chisholm; Greg Hatwell	Hatwell	3:34
4.	"This Time" (music video)			3:32

Europe CD maxi single
No.	Title	Writer(s)	Producer(s)	Length
1.	"This Time" (single version)	Argyle	Vettese	3:30
2.	"We Love to Entertain You"	Chisholm; Hatwell	Hatwell	3:34
3.	"Understand" (alternate version)	Chisholm; Argyle	Hague	3:52
4.	"This Time" (album version)	Argyle	Vettese	3:37

2-track CD single
No.	Title	Writer(s)	Producer(s)	Length
1.	"This Time" (single version)	Argyle	Vettese	3:30
2.	"We Love to Entertain You"	Chisholm; Hatwell	Hatwell	3:34

Notes

- Due to an error at the mastering studio, all releases contained the original version of "Understand", despite them being labelled as containing the Alternate Version. To rectify this error, Melanie C's official website gave the correct track away as a free download.

== Charts ==
Weekly chart performance for "This Time"
Chart (2007)	Peak position
Germany (GfK)	69
Germany (Official Airplay Chart)	45
Scotland Singles (OCC)	32
UK Singles (OCC)	94

== Release history ==
Release dates for "This Time"
Region	Date	Format	Label
Germany	October 12, 2007	CD single; digital download	Red Girl
United Kingdom	October 22, 2007	CD single; digital download	Red Girl
