= First Day of My Life (Melanie C song) =

2005 single by Melanie C

Single by Melanie C

from the album Beautiful Intentions
- B-side: "Runaway"; "Better Alone"; "Warrior"
- Released: 30 September 2005
- Length: 4:04
- Label: Red Girl
- Songwriters: Guy Chambers; Enrique Iglesias
- Producer: Richard Flack

Melanie C singles chronology
"Better Alone" (2005)	"First Day of My Life" (2005)	"The Moment You Believe" (2007)

Audio sample
- file; help

Music video
- "First Day of My Life" on YouTube

"First Day of My Life" is a song by British singer Melanie C. It was released on 30 September 2005 in Germany, Austria, and Switzerland as the third and final single from Melanie C's third solo album, Beautiful Intentions (2005). The song peaked at number one in Germany, Spain, and Switzerland, being certified platinum in Germany and gold in Switzerland. The song is Melanie C's most successful single in continental Europe, spending two years in different European charts. The single has sold over 1.5 million copies worldwide.

== Background ==
The song was written by Guy Chambers and Enrique Iglesias and had originally been recorded by Italian tenor Andrea Bocelli, with lyrics in Italian as "Un nuovo giorno" ("A new day") for his 2004 eponymous album Andrea, and he also released it as a single the same year. The song was not from the original Beautiful Intentions release, but was included on a re-release in Germany, Switzerland, Austria, and other European countries.

== Chart performance ==
The song became one of the biggest hits in Europe in 2005, but it was never released in UK as a commercial single, though it was included as a B side on one of the two UK CDs of her single "Carolyna". The song also was nominated as "The Single of the Year" at the 2006 ECHO Awards in Germany but lost to "Hung Up" by Madonna. On 15 September 2006, "First Day of My Life" went platinum in Germany, selling over 400,000 copies.

After a huge success of this single in Europe, Melanie recorded this song in French (Je suis née pour toi — I Am Born For You), to promote the single and album for French market. "First Day of My Life" also appeared on Chisholm's fourth album This Time as a bonus track for the Italian release.

The song spent 57 weeks on the Swiss Singles Chart, entering on 16 October 2005 at number 15 and exiting the charts on 13 May 2007 at number 87. It peaked at number one for two weeks, from 13 to 20 November 2005.

== Music video ==
The video was shot on location in Hannover, Lower Saxony, Germany, on 26 August 2005 and features a number of recognizable local landmarks. For key scenes of the video, a busy downtown thoroughfare known to locals as the Raschplatzhochstraße or Raschplatz overpass (on which Melanie can be seen standing and singing in the video) was closed for the afternoon.

== Formats and track listings ==
- European 3-Track CD
1. "First Day of My Life" – 4:04
2. "First Day of My Life" (acoustic version) – 4:04
3. "Runaway" - 3:24
- German 2-Track CD
1. "First Day of My Life" – 4:04
2. "Runaway" – 3:24
- German Maxi CD
1. "First Day of My Life" – 4:04
2. "First Day of My Life" (acoustic version) – 4:04
3. "Runaway" – 3:24
4. "First Day of My Life" (music video) – 4:04
- Australian Maxi CD
1. "First Day of My Life" – 4:04
2. "First Day of My Life" (acoustic) - 4:04
3. "Better Alone" (special Productions Re-work) – 6:50
4. "Better Alone" (edit) – 3:05
5. "Better Alone" (pop mix) – 3:56
- France CD
1. "First Day of My Life" – 4:04
2. "First Day of My Life" (acoustic version) – 4:04
- Italian CD
1. "First Day of My Life" – 4:04
2. "First Day of My Life" (acoustic version) – 4:04
3. "Warrior" – 3:47
4. "First Day of My Life" (music video) – 4:04

== Charts ==
=== Weekly charts ===
Chart (2005–2006)	Peak position
Australia (ARIA)	65
Austria (Ö3 Austria Top 40)	2
Belgium (Ultratip Bubbling Under Flanders)	3
Denmark (Tracklisten)	18
Europe (Eurochart Hot 100)	6
France (SNEP)	25
Germany (GfK)	1
Hungary (Rádiós Top 40)	38
Italy (FIMI)	32
Netherlands (Single Top 100)	94
Norway (VG-lista)	14
Spain (Promusicae)	1
Sweden (Sverigetopplistan)	9
Switzerland (Schweizer Hitparade)	1

=== Year-end charts ===
Chart (2005)	Position
Austria (Ö3 Austria Top 40)	7
Europe (Eurochart Hot 100)	61
Germany (Media Control GfK)	12
Switzerland (Schweizer Hitparade)	13

Chart (2006)	Position
Austria (Ö3 Austria Top 40)	29
Europe (Eurochart Hot 100)	52
Germany (Media Control GfK)	26
Switzerland (Schweizer Hitparade)	14

=== Decade-end charts ===
Chart (2000–2009)	Position
Germany (Media Control GfK)	21

== Certifications ==
Region	Certification	Certified units/sales
Germany (BVMI)	Platinum	300,000^{^}
Switzerland (IFPI Switzerland)	Gold	20,000^{^}
^{^} Shipments figures based on certification alone.

== Release history ==
Region	Date	Format(s)	Label(s)	Ref.
Austria	30 September 2005	CD	Red Girl; 313 Music	
Germany	30 September 2005	CD	Red Girl; 313 Music	
Switzerland	30 September 2005	CD	Red Girl; 313 Music	
Australia	15 May 2006	CD	Red Girl; Rajon	
