= The Bleeding (film) =

- Film poster
- Directed by: Charlie Picerni
- Written by: Lance Lane
- Produced by: Michael Tadross Jr.
- Starring: Vinnie Jones; Michael Matthias; DMX; Rachelle Leah; Michael Madsen; Kat Von D Armand Assante
- Cinematography: Tom Priestley Jr.
- Edited by: dB Bracamontes; Brad E. Wilhite
- Music by: Justin Caine Burnett
- Production company: Iron Bull Films
- Distributed by: Anchor Bay Entertainment
- Release date: November 2, 2009
- Running time: 80 minutes
- Country: United States
- Language: English

The Bleeding is a 2009 horror film directed by Charlie Picerni, and starring Michael Matthias, Vinnie Jones, DMX and Michael Madsen.

== Premise ==
An ex-Army Ranger searching for the killer of his parents discovers a family of vampires in a former chemical weapons factory-turned-nightclub.

== Cast ==
- Michael Matthias as Shawn Black
- Vinnie Jones as Cain, The King of The Vampire Family
- Michael Madsen as Father Roy
- DMX as "Tagg"
- Armand Assante as Jake Plummer
- William McNamara as Dan Williams
- Pittsburgh Slim as "Crash"
- Rachelle Leah as Lena
- Kat Von D as Vanya
- Sindy Rush as Katya

== Production ==
Filming took place in Wilmington, North Carolina.

== Release ==
The film premiered on November 14, 2009.
