= Better Alone =

2005 single by Melanie C

Single by Melanie C

from the album Beautiful Intentions
- B-side: "Warrior"; "Runaway"
- Released: 1 August 2005
- Recorded: 2004
- Length: 4:35 (album version); 3:06 (radio edit)
- Label: Red Girl
- Songwriters: Peter-John Vettese; Melanie Chisholm
- Producer: Greg Haver

Melanie C singles chronology
| "Next Best Superstar" (2005) | "Better Alone" (2005) | "First Day of My Life" (2005) |

Music video
- "Better Alone" UK music video on YouTube

Music video
- "Better Alone" European music video on YouTube

"Better Alone" is a song by British singer-songwriter, Melanie C. It was released as the second single from her third album Beautiful Intentions. The song is a piano-backed ballad which covers themes such as independence and emancipation from a stifling relationship. In the United Kingdom, it was available to purchase from iTunes and from the online shop on Melanie C's website, which sold a limited run of two physical CDs and a DVD single. It was also released in Australia, Italy, Sweden and Netherlands. In February 2006, after the success of First Day of My Life, "Better Alone" was released in Germany, Austria and Switzerland accompanied by a new music video, selling over 200,000 copies worldwide.

== Background ==
In January 2004, after a series of disappointments and the relative failure of singles "Melt" and "Yeh Yeh Yeh", Melanie C's contract with Virgin Records as a solo artist was terminated. In the middle of the year, after wrapping up The Barfly Mini-Tour, Melanie began recording songs for "Beautiful Intentions". She performed the song live at the O2 Academy Islington on 14 September 2004.

== Music video ==
UK version The first video for "Better Alone" was shot in March 2005 in Sussex, England and was directed by Mary McCartney. The video takes place in what appears to be a castle and shows Melanie wearing a green gown. This video on the enhanced CD single used the album version of the song, but the version on Melanie C's YouTube channel uses the radio edit.

European version The second video, which was directed by Robert Broellochs, was filmed in Mannheim, Germany on 10 December 2005. The video shows Melanie singing alone by a lake. She plays a woman who rips a photo of her and her ex-boyfriend and throws the pieces into the lake. The pieces appear sinking alongside a car where her boyfriend lies asleep and locked inside. That makes the viewers believe that Melanie was committing a passionate crime. As the video goes on, the man wakes up very scared inside the car and tries to save himself while Melanie is playing with the car keys and a dog. Finally, she decides to press the alarm button so the car doors open up, setting the man free at the bottom of the lake.

== Track listings ==
- Dutch CD
1. "Better Alone" (Edit) - 3:06
2. "Better Alone" (Pop Mix) - 3:56
3. "Warrior" - 3:47
- German maxi
1. "Better Alone" (Radio Version) - 3:06
2. "Better Alone" (Pop Mix Edit) - 3:26
3. "Warrior" - 3:48
4. "Better Alone" ('Amazing' Dub) - 7:46
5. "You'll Get Yours" (Acoustic Version) - 5:44
6. "Better Alone" (Music Video / Multimedia Track) - 3:06
- Swedish CD
1. "Better Alone" (Edit) - 3:06
2. "Better Alone" (Pop Mix Edit) - 3:26
3. "Warrior" - 3:47
4. "Better Alone" (Music video) - 3:06
- UK CD1 and iTunes Single
1. "Better Alone" (Edit) - 3:06
2. "Warrior" - 3:47
- UK CD2
1. "Better Alone" (Edit) - 3:06
2. "Better Alone" (Original Version) - 3:59
3. "Better Alone" (Pop Mix) - 3:56
4. "Better Alone" ('Amazing' Dub) - 7:44
- Australian CD
1. "Better Alone" (Edit) - 3:06
2. "Better Alone" (Pop Mix) - 3:56
3. "Better Alone" ('Amazing' Dub) - 7:44
4. "Runaway" - 3:24
- Italian CD
1. "Better Alone" (Edit) - 3:06
2. "Better Alone" (Original Version) - 3:59
3. "Better Alone" ('Amazing' Dub) - 7:44
4. "Runaway" - 3:24
- UK DVD
1. "Better Alone" (Music video) - 3:06
2. "Next Best Superstar" (Music video) - 3:31
3. EPK Extract ("Better Alone" & Interview) - 2:00
4. Photo Gallery (& "Runaway") - 3:24

== Charts ==
| Chart (2005) | Peak position |
|---|---|
| Australia (ARIA) | 83 |
| Austria (Ö3 Austria Top 40) | 57 |
| Germany (GfK) | 51 |
| Italy (FIMI) | 36 |
| Switzerland (Schweizer Hitparade) | 33 |

== Release history ==
| Region | Date | Format(s) | Label(s) | Ref. |
|---|---|---|---|---|
| United Kingdom | 1 August 2005 | CD | Red Girl | |
| Australia | 5 September 2005 | CD | Red Girl; Big; Rajon | |
| Austria | 24 February 2006 | CD | Red Girl; 313 Music; Warner Music Group | |
| Germany | 24 February 2006 | CD | Red Girl; 313 Music; Warner Music Group | |
| Switzerland | 24 February 2006 | CD | Red Girl; 313 Music; Warner Music Group | |
