= Understand (Melanie C song) =

2008 single by Melanie C

Single by Melanie C

from the album This Time
- Released: 25 July 2008
- Recorded: 2006 (Album version); 2007 (Alternate version)
- Genre: Pop rock
- Length: 3:43 (Album version); 3:51 (Alternate version)
- Label: Red Girl
- Songwriter(s): Melanie C; Adam Argyle
- Producer(s): Steve Mac; Stephen Hague (Alternate version)

Melanie C singles chronology
"This Time" (2007)	"Understand" (2008)	"Rock Me" (2011)

Music video
- "Understand" on YouTube

"Understand" is a song by British singer Melanie C. Written by Melanie C and Adam Argyle, it was released as the fifth and final single from the album This Time on 25 July 2008.

== Release ==
In early 2008, Melanie C announced through her official website, that "Understand" will be released in Canada as the second Canadian single from her album This Time.

The alternative version of the song, produced by Stephen Hague, was due to be released as a B-side with previous Melanie C's single "This Time" in the United Kingdom, Germany, Austria and Switzerland. However, due to a manufacturing error the original version was released instead. In response, Melanie offered the alternate track as a free download through her official website at the time.

== Music video ==
Melanie C mentioned during her appearance on the MuchMusic Video Awards 2008 that she would be using footage shot at the awards show for the music video of "Understand".

The music video was premiered on MuchMusic at 11:45am EST on Friday 25 July 2008. It featured Melanie meeting a guy in a subway station. Melanie and the guy ended up talking to each other in a restaurant. Footage used includes clips of her live shows from her Canadian Tour and her red carpet appearance on the MuchMusic Awards 2008 where she was greeted by a lot of Melanie C fans.

Melanie C's potential love interest in the music video is played by Adam Crossley, a singer-songwriter who also supported Melanie during her Canadian tour. Melanie C described the music video as her "guerrilla marketing" video.

== Live performances ==
Melanie C performed the song on the following events:

- Isle of Wight Festival 2007
- Live at the Hammerstein Ballroom, New York City
- This Time Canadian Tour

== Release history ==
Region	Date	Format
United States and Canada	25 July 2008	Digital download
