= Carolyna =

2007 single by Melanie C

Single by Melanie C

from the album This Time
- B-side: "Fragile"
- Released: 8 June 2007
- Length: 3:21
- Label: Red Girl
- Songwriters: Melanie Chisholm; Steve Mac; Paul Gendler
- Producer: Steve Mac

Melanie C singles chronology
"I Want Candy" (2007)	"Carolyna" (2007)	"This Time" (2007)

Music video
- "Carolyna" on YouTube

"Carolyna" is a song by British singer Melanie C. It was written by Melanie C, Paul Gendler, and Steve Mac for her fourth studio album, This Time (2007), while production was helmed by Mac. The song was released by Red Girl Records as the album's second single in United Kingdom and some European territories. "Carolyna" peaked at number 19 on the Scottish Singles Chart and entered the top 30 in Austria and Germany, also reaching number forty-nine on the UK Singles Chart.

== Composition ==
"Carolyna" was written by Melanie C along with Paul Gendler, and Steve Mac for her fourth studio album, This Time (2007). Production was overseen by Mac. Lyrically, "Carolyna" is about a girl who has had a rough start in life and needs to escape to find freedom and happiness. Melanie C revealed during her interview at British talk show Loose Women, that she wrote this song after watching a documentary in America about young kids living in the streets; and that the danger of homelessness was something that always scared her in her childhood.

== Chart performance ==
Released on 8 June 2007, the same week when the Spice Girls announced their reunion on their The Return of the Spice Girls Tour, "Carolyna" debuted and peaked at number 49 on the UK Singles Chart in the week of 30 June 2007. It charted for only one week, becoming Melanie C's first single not to chart inside the top 40 in the United Kingdom. Elsewhere, the song entered the top 30 in Austria and Germany, where it peaked at number 21 and 28, respectively.

== Music video ==
The music video was directed by Tim Royes and was shot on 3 May 2007, and it was the final video he directed before his death. The visuals see Melanie C as the guardian angel of a girl, played by actress Christina Chong, who is facing problems in her own life such as alcoholism, fighting with the boyfriend and non-stop partying. Whenever the girl looks herself at the mirror, she will see Melanie looking at her. Throughout the video, Melanie is also seen in the places where the girl was seen having problems such as the living room of the girl's house, the room where the girl was seen partying and the bedroom of the girl where at the end of the music video, Melanie then appears and spreads open her arms as a gesture of aid. The camera shows the tattoos on Melanie's wrists, which read "Love" and "Happiness" in Thai.

== Track listings ==
Europe CD maxi single

1. "Carolyna" (Album Version) 3:21
2. "Carolyna" (Boogieman Club Mix – Radio Edit) 3:17
3. "I Want Candy" (Single Version) 3:22
4. "Carolyna" (Boogieman RMX – Radio Version) 3:17
5. "Carolyna" (Boogieman Club Mix – Extended Version) 5:20

UK CD maxi single

1. "Carolyna" (Radio Edit)
2. "Carolyna" (Boogieman Radio Edit)
3. "Carolyna" (The Lawsy remix)
4. "First Day of My Life"

UK 7-inch vinyl/iTunes Single

1. "Carolyna" (Radio Edit)
2. "Fragile"

UK DVD single

1. "Carolyna" (Music Video)
2. "First Day of My Life" (Music Video)
3. "Fragile" (photo gallery from "Carolyna" video shoot)

== Credits and personnel ==
Credits adapted from the liner notes of This Time.

- Chad Chandler – mixing engineer
- Melanie Chisholm – vocals, writer
- Paul Gendler – writer
- Chris Laws – recording engineer
- Steve Mac – producer, writer
- Daniel Pursey – recording engineer

== Charts ==
Weekly chart performance for "Carolyna"
Chart (2007)	Peak position
Austria (Ö3 Austria Top 40)	21
Germany (GfK)	28
Italy (FIMI)	34
Scotland Singles (OCC)	19
Switzerland (Schweizer Hitparade)	31
UK Singles (OCC)	49

== Release history ==
Release dates for "Carolyna"
Region	Date	Format	Label
Europe	8 June 2007	CD single; digital download	Red Girl
United Kingdom	18 June 2007	CD single; digital download	Red Girl
Canada	8 April 2008	CD single; digital download	Red Girl
