= Next Best Superstar =

2005 single by Melanie C

Single by Melanie C

from the album Beautiful Intentions
- B-side: "Everything Must Change"
- Released: 4 April 2005
- Length: 3:31
- Label: Red Girl
- Songwriter(s): Adam Argyle
- Producer(s): Greg Haver

Melanie C singles chronology
"Melt" / "Yeh Yeh Yeh" (2003)	"Next Best Superstar" (2005)	"Better Alone" (2005)

Music video
- "Next Best Superstar" on YouTube

"Next Best Superstar" is a song by English singer Melanie C. The track was written by Adam Argyle and produced by Greg Haver for her third solo album, Beautiful Intentions (2005). The song features thumping drums and new wave guitars and talks about the fickleness of fame resulting from manufactured genre shows such as the music competition Pop Idol.

"Next Best Superstar" was released as the album's lead single on 4 April 2005. The song peaked at number ten on the UK Singles Chart and reached the top forty of the majority of all charts it appeared on, also becoming a top ten hit in Belgium, Italy and Scotland. An accompanying music video was Norwegian director by Ray Kay.

== Music video ==
The video was directed by Ray Kay in January 2005. The video begins with Melanie C getting ready for her performance. After having done make-up, she starts performing by herself. After the performance, she gets her make-up done again and starts performing again, this time with her band. The video premiered on CD:UK on 26 February 2005.

== Track listings ==
- UK CD1
1. "Next Best Superstar" – 3:31
2. "Everything Must Change" – 3:32
- UK CD2
1. "Next Best Superstar" – 3:31
2. "Next Best Superstar" (Groove Cutters Remix) – 7:06
3. "Next Best Superstar" (Culprit One club mix) – 5:29
4. "Next Best Superstar" (Culprit One alternative remix) – 3:01
5. "Next Best Superstar" (video)
- UK 7-inch single

A. "Next Best Superstar" – 3:31
B. "Next Best Superstar" (acoustic) – 3:04

- German CD single
1. "Next Best Superstar" – 3:31
2. "Next Best Superstar" (acoustic) – 3:04
3. "Everything Must Change" – 3:32
4. "Next Best Superstar" (Culprit One alternative remix) – 3:01
5. "Next Best Superstar" (enhanced video track) – 3:31
- Australian CD single
1. "Next Best Superstar" – 3:31
2. "Next Best Superstar" (acoustic) – 3:04
3. "Everything Must Change" – 3:32
4. "Next Best Superstar" (Groove Cutters Remix) – 7:14
5. "Next Best Superstar" (Culprit One club mix) – 5:29
6. "Next Best Superstar" (Culprit One alternative remix) – 3:01

== Charts ==
Chart (2005)	Peak position
Australia (ARIA)	41
Austria (Ö3 Austria Top 40)	45
Belgium (Ultratip Bubbling Under Flanders)	3
Belgium (Ultratip Bubbling Under Wallonia)	6
Germany (GfK)	32
Ireland (IRMA)	37
Italy (FIMI)	21
Netherlands (Single Top 100)	28
Scotland (OCC)	8
Sweden (Sverigetopplistan)	31
Switzerland (Schweizer Hitparade)	25
UK Singles (OCC)	10

== Release history ==
Region	Date	Format(s)	Label(s)	Ref.
Australia	4 April 2005	CD	Big; Rajon	
United Kingdom	4 April 2005	7-inch vinyl; CD	Red Girl	
