= Thinkin Out Loud =

EP by Kristinia DeBarge
- Released: January 7, 2016
- Recorded: 2014–2015
- Genres: R&B; soul
- Length: 29:30
- Labels: Krissy D; Beatstreet Inc.
- Producer: Adonis Shropshire

Kristinia DeBarge chronology
Young & Restless (2013)	Thinkin Out Loud (2016)	Peaceful Understanding (2016)

Thinkin Out Loud is an extended play (EP) by American singer Kristinia DeBarge, that was released via digital distribution on January 7, 2016 through Krissy D Entertainment and Beatstreet Inc.

DJ Inferno premiered "Problem" on KPWR on November 23, 2015. "Problem" premiered exclusively on Rap-Up on January 11, 2016.

== Track listing ==
No.	Title	Writer(s)	Length
1.	"Hol' on Boy"	Kristinia DeBarge, Adonis Shropshire	3:14
2.	"Problem" (featuring Problem)	Kristinia DeBarge, Adonis Shropshire, Jason Martin	4:26
3.	"Afternoon Cigarette"	Kristinia DeBarge, Adonis Shropshire, Aurora Pfeiffer	3:16
4.	"I Don't Giva"	Kristinia DeBarge, Adonis Shropshire	3:38
5.	"Amnesia"	Kristinia DeBarge, Adonis Shropshire, Smitty Smith Soul	3:22
6.	"Ricky Bobby"	Kristinia DeBarge, Adonis Shropshire	4:15
7.	"Church"	Kristinia DeBarge, Adonis Shropshire	3:45
8.	"Fadeout" (featuring Iamsu!)	Kristinia DeBarge, Adonis Shropshire, Sudan Williams, Rachel Suter	3:34
Total length:			29:30

== Release history ==
Region	Date	Label
United States	January 7, 2016	Krissy D Ent./Beatstreet Inc.
