= The Moment You Believe =

2007 single by Melanie C

Single by Melanie C

from the album This Time
- B-side: "Fragile"
- Released: 16 March 2007
- Length: 3:28
- Label: Red Girl
- Songwriters: Melanie Chisholm; Peter-John Vettese
- Producer: Peter-John Vettese

Melanie C singles chronology
"First Day of My Life" (2005)	"The Moment You Believe" (2007)	"I Want Candy" (2007)

Music video
- "The Moment You Believe" on YouTube

"The Moment You Believe" is a song by British singer Melanie C. It written along with Peter-John Vettese for her fourth album This Time (2007), with production also overseen by Vettese. The song was released by Red Girl Records as the album's first single. Serving as a soundbed for the spring advertising campaign for German television show Nur die Liebe zählt, "The Moment You Believe" became a hit in some parts of Europe, reaching number one in Spain and the top 20 in Germany, Sweden and Switzerland.

== Chart performance ==
Released by Red Girl Records on 16 March 2007, "The Moment You Believe" debuted at number nine on the Spanish Singles Chart in the week of 22 April 2007. It climbed to the top spot the following week. The song marked Melanie C's second consecutive number-one hit after "First Day of My Life" /2005) and would remain two weeks at number one. Elsewhere, "The Moment You Believe" reached the top twenty in Germany, Sweden, and Switzerland.

== Music video ==
A music video for "The Moment You Believe" was premiered on 23 February 2007 on German music television network VIVA. It was directed by Tim Royes at 17 February 2007 and shot at Ealing Studios, West London the day after Melanie C had filmed the video for her single "I Want Candy" (2007). It was captured in one long shot on a steadicam. A total of six takes were filmed, and the final product is the result of looking over those six and picking the best one.

== Track listings ==
2-track CD single
No.	Title	Writer(s)	Producer(s)	Length
1.	"The Moment You Believe"	Melanie Chisholm; Peter-John Vettese	Vettese	3:29
2.	"Fragile"	Chisholm; Greg Hatwell	Hatwell	4:05

Europe CD maxi single
No.	Title	Writer(s)	Producer(s)	Length
1.	"The Moment You Believe"	Chisholm; Vettese	Vettese	3:29
2.	"Fragile"	Chisholm; Hatwell	Hatwell	4:05
3.	"The Moment You Believe" (Attraction mix)	Bunton; Muddiman; Peden	Vettese	4:59
4.	"The Moment You Believe" (Instrumental)	Bunton; Muddiman; Peden	Vettese	3:29
5.	"The Moment You Believe" (Piano/vocal mix)	Bunton; Muddiman; Peden	Vettese	3:29

== Charts ==
=== Weekly charts ===
Weekly chart performance for "The Moment You Believe"
Chart (2007)	Peak position
Austria (Ö3 Austria Top 40)	28
Czech Republic Airplay (ČNS IFPI)	48
Germany (GfK)	15
Spain (PROMUSICAE)	1
Sweden (Sverigetopplistan)	18
Switzerland (Schweizer Hitparade)	14

=== Year-end charts ===
Year-end chart performance for "The Moment You Believe"
Chart (2007)	Position
Switzerland (Schweizer Hitparade)	80

== Release history ==
Release dates for "The Moment You Believe"
Region	Date	Format	Label
Austria	16 March 2007	CD single; digital download	Red Girl
Germany	16 March 2007	CD single; digital download	Red Girl
Switzerland	16 March 2007	CD single; digital download	Red Girl
Scandinavia	21 March 2007	CD single; digital download	Red Girl
