= Young & Restless (Kristinia DeBarge album) =

Studio album by Kristinia DeBarge
- Released: May 3, 2013 (Japan)
- Recorded: 2011–2013
- Genre: Pop, R&B
- Length: 51:39
- Label: Manhattan Records
- Producer: Mike Mac, Bei Maejor, The Jam, Rob Knox, Catalyst, Michael Jay, Jonny Jam

Kristinia DeBarge chronology
Exposed (2009)	Young & Restless (2013)	Thinkin Out Loud (2016)

Singles from Young & Restless
- 1. "Cry Wolf" Released: September 27, 2012; 2. "Ignite" Released: April 3, 2013; 3. "Higher" Released: May 29, 2013

Young & Restless is the second album by American singer Kristinia DeBarge that was released on May 3, 2013 through Manhattan Records exclusively to Japan. Two singles have been released so far. "Cry Wolf", the first single was released on September 27, 2012 independently and did not chart on any major chart. "Ignite", its second single was released on April 3, 2013 exclusively through Japan iTunes and has so far peaked at number six on the iTunes Japan R&B chart.

== Track listing ==
Young & Restless track listing
No.	Title	Writer(s)	Length
1.	"Ignite"	Kuizz, Roderick Kerr	3:35
2.	"Cry Wolf"	Lindsay Fields, Michael Mcnamara, Jordan Baum, Travis Margis	3:13
3.	"Flashbacks"	Kristinia DeBarge, Will Good, Roderick Kerr, Jonas Olsson	2:42
4.	"Call U My Own"	Kristinia DeBarge, Will Good, Roderick Kerr, Kolja	3:40
5.	"Ten Billion Years"	Chauncy Jackson, Kimberly Croft,	4:02
6.	"Not Afraid of Ghosts"	Kristinia DeBarge, Michael James Mani, Jordan Omley	3:02
7.	"Hold On"	Roderick Kerr, Reynard Silva, Catalyst	3:02
8.	"Higher"	Kristinia DeBarge, Will Good, Roderick Kerr	3:26
9.	"Nights in the City"	Kristinia DeBarge, Alex Teamer, Melodye Perry & Shayon Daniel	3:41
10.	"Now That You're Gone"	Roderick Kerr, Daniel Sherman	3:42
11.	"Find Me"	Kristinia DeBarge, Will Good, Roderick Kerr	3:35
12.	"Waited Too Long"	Kristinia DeBarge, Will Rappaport & Jenri Jouni Kristian Lanz	3:05
13.	"Find It in My Heart"	Kristinia DeBarge, Will Good, Roderick Kerr, Kolja	3:35
14.	"Better Way to Say Goodbye"	Kristinia DeBarge, Michael Jay Margules, Johnny Mosegaard Pedersen	3:45
15.	"Dreamcatcher" (bonus track)	Kristinia DeBarge, Michael McNamara, Jordan Baum	3:34

== Release history ==
Region	Date	Label
Japan	May 3, 2013	Manhattan Records
