= Tastemaker (EP) =

EP by Pittsburgh Slim
- Released: December 4, 2007
- Recorded: Now City Studios (Winston-Salem, North Carolina)
- Genre: Hip hop
- Label: Def Jam
- Producer: Ski Beatz, The Apple Juice Kid

Professional ratings
Review scores
Source	Rating
AllMusic	3/5 stars

Tastemaker is the debut EP by rapper Pittsburgh Slim. It was released by Def Jam Records on December 4, 2007.

== Track listing ==
1. "Pittsburgh Slim"
2. "Superstar Extraordinaire"
3. "My Flashy World"
4. "Girls Kiss Girls"
5. "Sunrays"
6. "Kiss and Tell"
7. "Toy"
8. "Girls Kiss Girls (Dirty Version)"
