= Lara Scandar =

Egyptian singer and songwriter (born 1990)

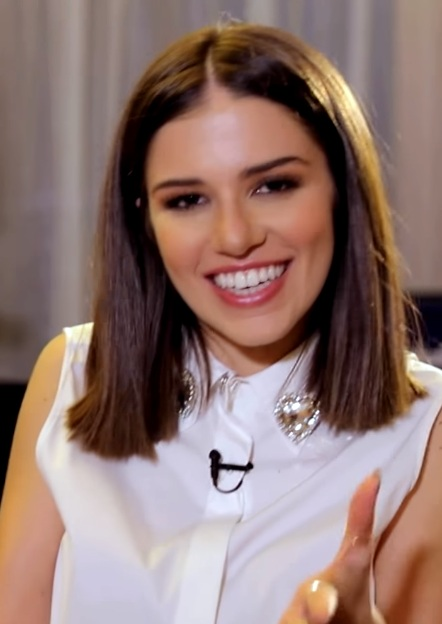
- Lara Scandar as she appeared in "Journey" by Out of the Blue, 2017

Background information
- Born: December 18, 1990 (age 35); Santa Monica, California, U.S.
- Genres: Pop
- Occupations: singer, songwriter, model
- Years active: 2009–present
- Labels: JMR Studios
- Website: larascandar.com

Lara Scandar (Arabic: لارا إسكندر; born 18 December 1990) is an Egyptian-Lebanese singer and songwriter who rose to fame in 2009 after participating in the Pan Arab talent show, Star Academy.

== Life and career ==
=== Early life ===
Scandar was born on December 18, 1990, in Santa Monica, California to an Egyptian-Italian father and a Lebanese mother. Lara comes from a Christian family. Her family moved back to Cairo, Egypt right after her birth. Scandar grew up in a music-loving family where both her father and grandfather enjoyed singing as a hobby. She and her sister Tamara were always encouraged to perform in school plays and musicals as well as out-of-school activities.

Scandar’s parents enrolled her in ballet classes at the age of 4, which she continued to study until the age of 15. At age 6, she began modeling in catwalks for kids’ clothing brands as well as TV and print ads. She continued to model until the age of 17, right before her admission to Star Academy.

=== Star Academy ===
After graduating from high school, Scandar auditioned for Star Academy, a Pan-Arab talent show based in Lebanon that brings together young talents from all over the Arab world who have to live together and compete for the "Star" title. She was one of three Egyptians chosen to represent her country on the sixth season of the show, which debuted in February 2009. Scandar stood out by singing in several languages (English, French, Spanish, and Italian). She was the last Egyptian remaining in the competition and reached the semi-finals.

=== Post-Star Academy ===
After Scandar's popularity in Star Academy 6, award-winning Lebanese producer and composer Jean-Marie Riachi approached her, and they have worked together since then. She released her first single "Mission Is You" on February 3, 2010, for which she won the MEMA (Middle East Music Award) for the Encouragement Award given to rising artists with evident potential to succeed. Her second and third singles followed within the next year.

=== Herbal Essences ===
In 2011, it was announced that Scandar had been chosen to be the face of Herbal Essences Arabia. She wrote her third single, "See The Beauty", specifically for the brand’s advertising campaign.

=== About A Girl ===
In 2012, Scandar released her first studio album About A Girl, which included three songs written by her, one Arabic track, a dance cover of Toto Cutugno’s "L'Italiano" and six other tracks. The success of her single "Taalou Ghannou Maaya" (Toto Cutugno’s cover) garnered a larger Arabic-speaking audience and helped gain more recognition in the Arab world as well as several other music awards and nominations.

=== 2014–present ===
Scandar teamed up with Herbal Essences Arabia for the first online interactive concert in the Middle East, covering popular Egyptian classics as well as originals and other covers in English. The concert allowed fans to interact with the musician during the concert and be the first to listen to her new single "Love Birds".

Scandar is currently working on her new album. She released "Khalas Khalas", her first Lebanese single, in April 2017 and its video clip in May 2017. She participated in the opening ceremony of Rams road in luxor by singing a duet with the star mohamed hamaki called "baladna helwa". She also participated as an actress in "al thamania" series and in "kera wel gen" movie which was a blockbuster in Egypt.

== Discography ==
Single	Year	Peak chart positions	Album
Single	Year	LEB	Album
"Mission Is You"	2010	19	About A Girl
"Chains"	2011	12	About A Girl
"See The Beauty"	2011	18	About A Girl
"Falling Out Of Love"	2012	11	About A Girl
"Taalou Ghannou Maaya (تعالوا غنّوا معاي׳)"	2012	4	About A Girl
"—" denotes releases that did not chart or were not released in that territory.

Album	Year	Peak chart positions		
Album	Year	LEBANON	EGYPT	DUBAI
"About a Girl"	2012	1	1	1

As featured artist

Song
"White Christmas" (on Castana)

== Awards ==
Year	Award	Category	Results
2010	MEMA Awards	Encouragement Award	Won
2011	Dear Guest Festival	Best Rising Female Artist	Won
2012	Murex D'or Awards	Best Rising Female Star	Nominated
2012	Dear Guest Festival	Best Female Youth Singer	Won
2013	Murex D'or Awards	Best Promising Female Singer	Won
2013	MTV EMA Award	Best Middle East Act	Nominated
2013	Esquire Magazine Awards	Woman We Love	Won
