= Cry Me a River =

Cry Me a River may refer to:

== Music ==
- "Cry Me a River" (Arthur Hamilton song), written by Arthur Hamilton in 1953, popularized by Julie London in 1955, and recorded by many performers
- Cry Me a River (album), by John Hicks, 1997
- "Cry Me a River" (Justin Timberlake song), 2002
- "Cry Me a River", a song by Pride and Glory from Pride & Glory, 1994

== Other uses ==
- Cry Me a River (film), a 2008 Chinese short film by Jia Zhangke
- Cry Me a River (play), a 1997 revised version of Joyce Carol Oates's 1991 play Black
- Cry Me a River, a 1993 novel by T. R. Pearson
- "Cry Me a River", a 1996 Betty and Veronica comics story by Frank Doyle
