= Kristinia DeBarge =

American singer (born 1990)

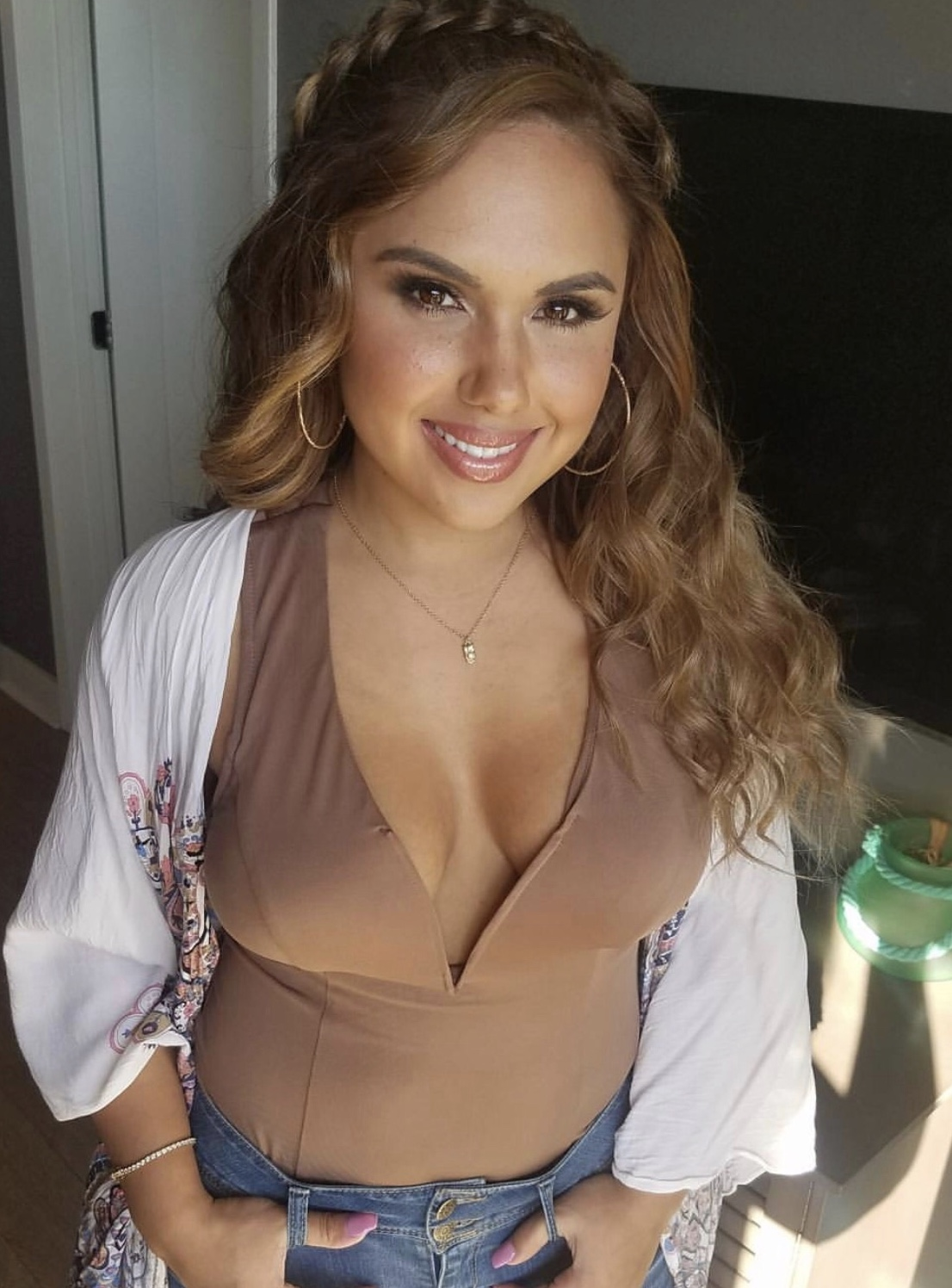
- DeBarge in 2017

Background information
- Born: Kristinia Jamie DeBarge; March 8, 1990 (age 36); South Pasadena, California, U.S.
- Origin: Los Angeles, California, U.S.
- Genres: Pop; R&B; soul
- Occupations: Singer; songwriter; actress
- Years active: 2003–present
- Labels: Bane; Krissy D Ent.; Beatstreet Inc.; Soda Pop; Island; Universal; Manhattan
- Website: facebook.com/KristiniaDeBarge/

Kristinia Jamie DeBarge (/krɪˈstɪniə/; born March 8, 1990) is an American singer, songwriter and actress. She first appeared on national television in 2003 as a contestant on the American Idol spin-off, American Juniors. In 2009, DeBarge signed a contract with the Island Records department Sodapop Records, releasing her debut album, Exposed, in July of the same year.

== Life and career ==
=== Family and early life ===
Born on March 8, 1990, DeBarge is the daughter of James DeBarge. DeBarge began singing when she was 3 years old, but did not begin to take it seriously until she was 12. When she was 12, her father took her into a recording studio where they worked until 4 A.M. recording a duet titled "How I Feel Inside", which made her father realize that she was serious about beginning a singing career.

In 2003, she was a contestant on the American Idol spin-off, American Juniors. DeBarge progressed to the semi-final round of 20 contestants. She was featured in the first group of ten semi-finalists and sang the song "Reflection" from the Disney film Mulan. However, she was not one of the five to progress from that group into the final ten.

=== 2009: Exposed ===
At 14, DeBarge was introduced to Kenneth "Babyface" Edmonds. She worked with him for five years and, two days before her nineteenth birthday, signed to a new division of Island Def Jam Records founded by Edmonds and Jeff Burroughs called Sodapop Records. DeBarge's first single "Goodbye" off her debut album Exposed was released in April 2009. "Goodbye" met with commercial success in the United States, the single debuted at number 75 on the Billboard Hot 100 singles chart, and later reached a peak of number 15 on the chart. The single was also a success in Canada, where it reached a peak of number 15 on the Canadian Hot 100. Exposed, was released on July 28, 2009. Exposed received generally positive reviews from music critics, based on an aggregate score of 69/100 from Metacritic. In the United States, the album debuted at number 23 on the Billboard 200. DeBarge also opened up for pop singer Britney Spears, during Spears' 2009 world tour, The Circus Starring: Britney Spears.

=== 2009–2013: After Exposed and new album Young & Restless ===
In November 2009, The Wet Seal, Inc., a leading specialty retailer to young women, announced a partnership with DeBarge which included a collection of fashion pieces selected by DeBarge. In January 2010, DeBarge received an NAACP Image Award nomination for "Outstanding New Artist". DeBarge made an appearance in School Gyrls, which premiered on Nickelodeon in March 2010. In September 2012, DeBarge released her single "Cry Wolf" from her exclusive Japan album Young & Restless.

On April 3, 2013, DeBarge released another single ("Ignite") from Young & Restless exclusively to Japan through Manhattan Records. The song peaked at number six one day after its release on the Japanese iTunes R&B Chart. On May 29, 2013, DeBarge released another single from the album, "Higher".

=== 2014: Third studio album and School Dance ===
DeBarge was featured on Redrama's new single and music video "Let Go" on January 17, 2014. DeBarge and Redrama performed on live television for Finland's finals of the Eurovision Song Contest 2014 at the Barona Areena in Espoo on February 1, 2014. The single was a success in Finland, where it reached No. 1 on NRJ's Top 10 list on February 4, 2014, and No. 1 on Spotify on February 7, 2014. The single reached a peak of No. 3 on the Finnish Single Charts. On February 25, 2014, the single reached a peak of No. 1 on the Finnish Airplay Charts.

DeBarge started working on her third studio album in March 2014 with Adonis Shropshire. DeBarge's second acting role came on July 2, 2014, in Nick Cannon's directorial debut School Dance.

=== 2015: New Music Mondays and Growing Up Hip Hop ===
On January 5, 2015, DeBarge and Adonis Shropshire started exclusively releasing new music to YouTube. She entitled the project "New Music Mondays". On July 8, 2015, WE tv announced it would mine the stories of real-life rap industry families on "Growing Up Hip Hop". Set to air January 7, 2016, the six-episode reality series stars DeBarge, Angela Simmons, Damon "Boogie" Dash, Romeo Miller, Egypt Criss, and TJ Mizell and some of their famous parents appeared on the show. DeBarge announced in an interview in September 2015 that she would be releasing a new studio album around the premiere of Growing Up Hip Hop.

=== 2016–present: New music ===
DeBarge released two EPs and a single in 2016: Thinkin Out Loud, Peaceful Understanding and "Crystal Ball". In 2017, she partnered with Priority/Capitol Records and released the single "Pink Love". On July 31, 2018, she independently released the single "Hangover". On December 22, 2018, she independently released the single "Alright". In 2019, she released two singles "Breathe" and "Back in the Day" and on April 21, 2020, she released her single "Carousel". On June 11, 2021, she released a new song "Bet" featuring Eric Bellinger.

=== 2018: Krissy D Cosmetics ===
On September 30, 2018, DeBarge announced the formation of her new cosmetics company, Krissy D Cosmetics. The online company launched on November 23, 2018, with the “Amethyst Collection” (a 17 piece vegan brush set), the “Aplysina Blender” (a makeup sponge) and the “3D Inlashuation Mascara” (a waterproof and smudge free mascara that sold out within minutes). On February 12, 2019, the company released the "World Tour" eyeshadow palette.

== Tours ==
=== Opening act ===
• The Circus Starring Britney Spears (2009)

== Discography ==
=== Studio albums ===
Year	Album details	Peak	
Year	Album details	US	JPN
2009	Exposed: Release Date: July 28, 2009; Label: Island/Def Jam Recordings; Format: CD, digital download	23	—
2013	Young & Restless: Release Date: May 3, 2013 (JP); Label: Manhattan Records; Format: CD, digital download	—	236
TBA	Back in the Day: Release Date:	TBR	TBR

=== EPs ===
Year	Album details
2016	Thinkin Out Loud: Release Date: January 7, 2016; Label: Krissy D Ent./Beatstreet Inc.; Format: digital download
2016	Peaceful Understanding: Release Date: October 13, 2016; Label: Krissy D Ent./Beatstreet Inc.; Format: digital download
2022	EMPOWHER: Release Date: August 26, 2022; Label: Krissy D Ent./Beatstreet Inc.; Format: digital download

=== Singles ===
List of singles, with selected chart positions
Title	Year	Peak chart positions				Certifications	Album
Title	Year	US	US Dance	CAN	SWE	Certifications	Album
"Goodbye"	2009	15	3	15	26	RIAA: Platinum	Exposed
"Sabotage"	2009	—	—	—	—		Exposed
"Future Love"	2009	— (Note: "Future Love" did not enter the Billboard Hot 100, but peaked at number 25 on the Bubbling Under Hot 100 Singles chart.)	—	—	—		Exposed
"Cry Wolf"	2012	—	—	—	—		Young & Restless
"Ignite"	2013	—	—	—	—		Young & Restless
"Higher"	2013	—	—	—	—		Young & Restless
"Fadeout" (featuring Iamsu!)	2016	—	—	—	—		Thinkin Out Loud
"Crystal Ball"	2017	—	—	—	—		non-album singles
"Pink Love"	2017	—	—	—	—		non-album singles
"Hangover"	2018	—	—	—	—		non-album singles
"Alright"	2018	—	—	—	—		non-album singles
"Breathe"	2019	—	—	—	—		non-album singles
"Back in the Day"	2019	—	—	—	—		Back in the Day
"Carousel"	2020	—	—	—	—		non-album singles
"Wave"	2020	—	—	—	—		non-album singles
"Bet" (featuring Eric Bellinger)	2021	—	—	—	—		TBA
"—" denotes releases that did not chart

==== As featured artist ====
List of singles, with selected chart positions
Title	Year	Peak chart positions
Title	Year	FIN
"Let Go" (Redrama feat. Kristinia DeBarge)	2014	3

=== Music videos ===
Year	Title
2009	Goodbye
2009	Sabotage
2012	Cry Wolf
2014	Let Go feat. Kristinia DeBarge
2016	Fadeout feat. Iamsu
2017	Crystal Ball
2017	Pink Love
2021	Bet feat. Eric Bellinger

== Filmography ==
=== Film ===
Year	Title	Role	Notes
2010	School Gyrls	Herself	
2010	Turn the Beat Around	Herself	Television movie
2012	Christmas in Compton	Lola	
2014	School Dance	Anastacia	
2015	The Mint	Melody	

=== Television ===
Year	Title	Role	Notes
2016–2018	Growing Up Hip Hop	Herself	

== Awards and nominations ==
Year	Association	Awards	Category	Result
2009	MTV Video Music Awards	"Goodbye"	Best Choreography	Nominated
2010	NAACP Image Awards	Kristinia DeBarge	Outstanding New Artist	Nominated

== See also ==
- List of Afro-Latinos
