= Culprit 1 =

British DJ, remixer and electronica producer

- Birth name: James Hannam
- Also known as: Culprit 1, Culprit One, Culp
- Origin: Newport, Wales
- Genres: Electronica
- Occupation: DJ
- Instrument: Keyboards
- Years active: 2003–present
- Labels: Exceptional Records
- Website: Official Site; MySpace page

Culprit 1 a.k.a. Culprit One (born James Hannam) is a British DJ, remixer and electronica producer.

== Early life and education ==
Hannam holds a degree in music from the Royal Welsh College of Music and Drama and attended Crosskeys College in the Welsh valleys, where the Manic Street Preachers also studied.

== Career ==
Hannam's music has been broadcast on BBC Radio 1 by Steve Lamacq, Zane Lowe, Bethan Elfyn, Annie Mac, Annie Nightingale, Colin Murray and Huw Stephens (who contributed sleeve notes to first album 'Running in Order'). Eddy Temple-Morris, Adam Walton and Radio 101 (Croatia) have also supported Culprit 1 releases.

"What I Use", the first recording made under the Culprit 1 moniker, was released in July 2003 on Boobytrap. Hannam went on to perform at the American South by Southwest event and subsequently signed to Exceptional Records.

Following popular events with a string quartet early in 2007 (two members of which also performed with Kanye West on his 2006 UK tour), he found favour in the classical music world, earning the support of influential UK radio station Classic FM.

In November 2010, Exceptional released Hannam's second album Theme 2, featuring vocal contributions from Smiler, Polarbear and Iko.

== Discography ==
Title	Format	Label	Year
"What I Use"	CD single	Boobytrap Records	2003
Aqoon Guud	CD EP	My Kung Fu	2004
"Jarred" / "What I Use"	12 “ vinyl single	My Kung Fu	2004
"No Need to Ask"	CD single	My Kung Fu	2005
"Sway"	12” vinyl single	Exceptional Records	2006
"Hollow"	Download single	Exceptional Records	2006
"Tricks"	12” vinyl single	Exceptional Records	2007
Running in Order	CD album	Exceptional Records	2007
"No Need To Ask" (reissue & remixes)	12" vinyl single	Exceptional Records	2007
"Screamer"	Download single	Exceptional Records	2010
"Distraction" (feat. Smiler)	Download single	Exceptional Records	2010
Theme 2	Download album	Exceptional Records	2010

== Remix discography ==
Artist	Release	Label	Year
The Messiah Complex	Fever	We Are Your Friends	2004
The Martini Henry Rifles	Slash the Seats	My Kung Fu	2005
Melanie C	Next Best Superstar	Red Girl Records	2005
Jo and Danny	Dying Kiss	Double Snazzy	2006
The Automatic	Monster	B-Unique / Polydor	2006
The Automatic	Recover	B-Unique / Polydor	2006
The Automatic	Raoul	B-Unique / Polydor	2007
Paul Hartnoll feat. Robert Smith	Please	Kids	2007
Kaiser Chiefs	The Angry Mob	B-Unique / Polydor (promo only)	2007
John Hardy & BBC National Orchestra of Wales	Letters	Ffin Records	2010

== Other information ==
- Unusually for a producer in a traditionally serious and publicity-shy genre, Hannam maintains an amusing, tongue-in-cheek journal and Facebook group, in which he regularly describes his studio experiments, vegetarian recipes and journeys back to Wales.
- A couple that met at the debut Culprit 1 performance in October 2003, married in 2008.
- The name Culprit 1 was influenced by a graffiti scrawling at Newport bus station.
- At Bettws High School in Newport, Hannam won the 1992 Eisteddfod keyboard solo competition with a rendition of 2 Unlimited's European hit "No Limits".
- Hannam's first job after graduating from university was a club reviewer for the UK dance magazine Muzik. The editor at the time was Conor McNicholas, who later became editor of the music magazine NME.
