= Wild boar (disambiguation) =

The wild boar (Sus scrofa, a.k.a. simply boar, or wild pig) is the wild ancestor of the domestic pig. The term may also refer to:

- Wild Boar (film) a 2013 documentary
- Wild Boar, English translation of Wilde Sau, the German World War II night fighter tactic
- The Wild Boars, the local junior football team rescued in the Tham Luang cave rescue in Thailand in 2018
- Kragujevac Wild Boars, American football team in Serbia

== See also ==
- Boar (disambiguation)
- Feral pig
- Wild pig (disambiguation)
