= Polaroid Corporation =

American film and camera company (1937–2002)

- Last logo used from 1996 to 2001. The namesake brand used this till 2020.

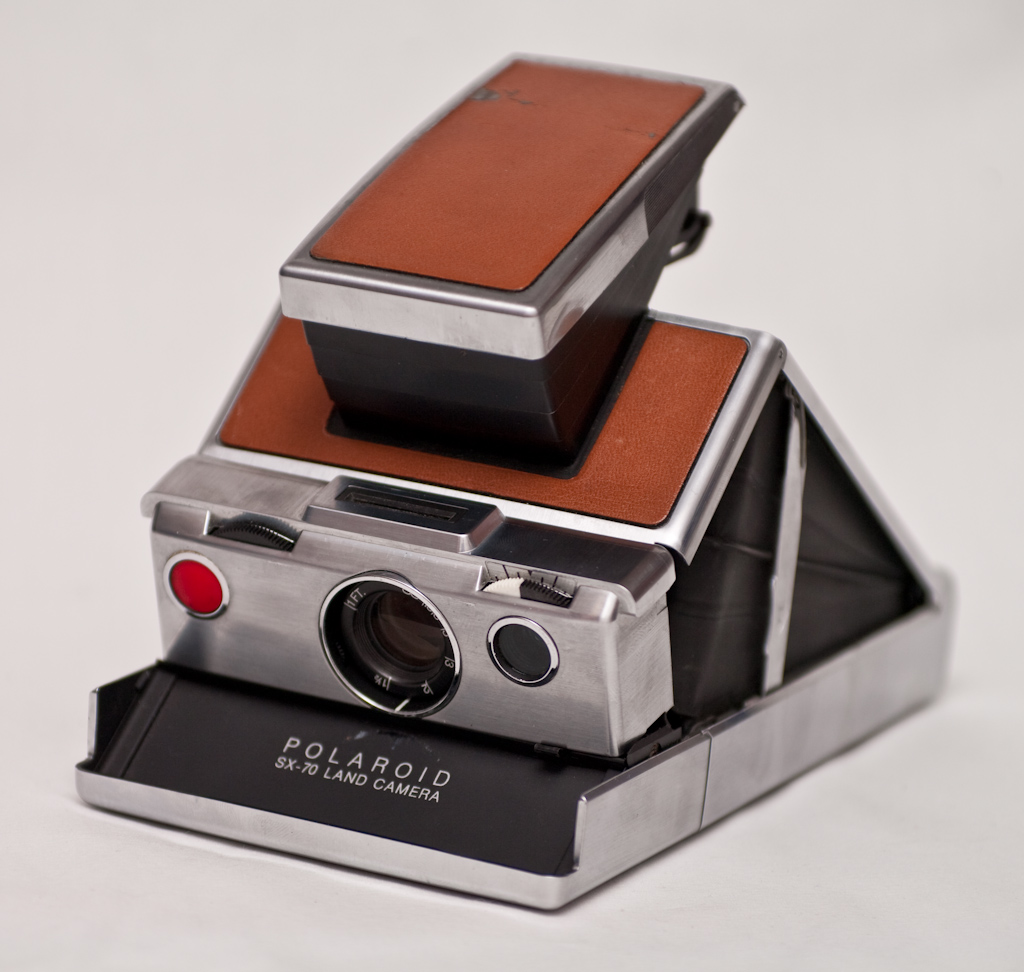
- The Polaroid SX-70, manufactured by Polaroid Corporation from 1972 to 1981
- Type: Private
- Industry: Photo; Consumer electronics; Licensing
- Founded: 1937; 89 years ago, in Cambridge, Massachusetts, U.S.
- Founder: Edwin H. Land
- Defunct: 2001
- Fate: Bankruptcy and liquidation; Brand sold to One Equity Partners; changed name to Primary PDC, Inc.
- Successor: Polaroid B.V.
- Headquarters: Minnetonka, Minnesota, U.S.
- Area served: Worldwide
- Products: Instant cameras; Instant film; Digital cameras; Action cameras
- Number of employees: 21,000 (1978)

Polaroid Corporation was an American company that made instant film and cameras, which survives as a brand for consumer electronics. The company was founded in 1937 by Edwin H. Land, to exploit his Polaroid polarizing polymer. Land and Polaroid created the first instant camera, the Land Camera, in 1948.

Land ran the company until 1981. Its peak employment was 21,000 in 1978, and its peak revenue was $3 billion in 1991.

Polaroid Corporation filed for bankruptcy in 2001; its brand and assets were sold off. A successor Polaroid company formed, and the branded assets changed hands multiple times before being sold to Polish billionaire Wiaczesław Smołokowski in 2017. This acquisition allowed Impossible Project, which had started producing instant films for older Polaroid cameras in 2008, to rebrand as Polaroid Originals in 2017, and eventually as Polaroid in 2020. Since the original company's downfall, Polaroid-branded products in other fields, such as LCD televisions and DVD players, have been developed and released by various licensees globally.

== History ==
=== Founding and success ===
Polaroid logo from 1977 to 1991, using a modified variant of the 1962 symbol, designed by Paul Giambarba

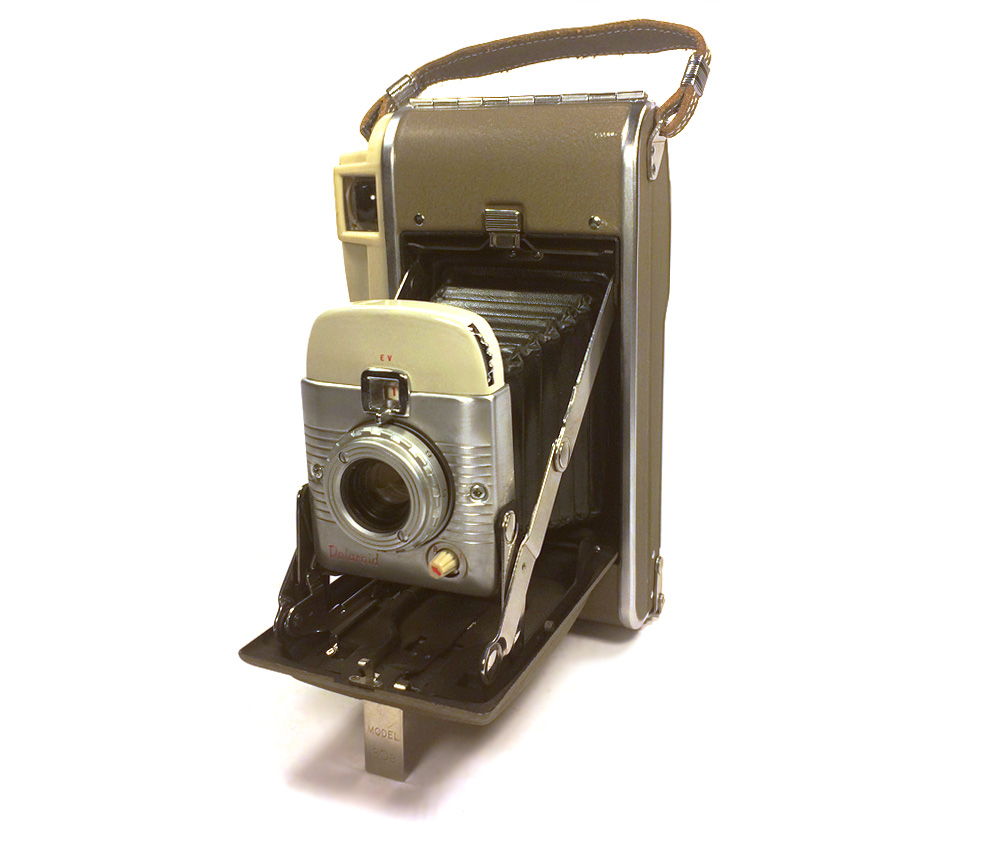
Polaroid 80B Highlander instant camera made in the USA, circa 1959

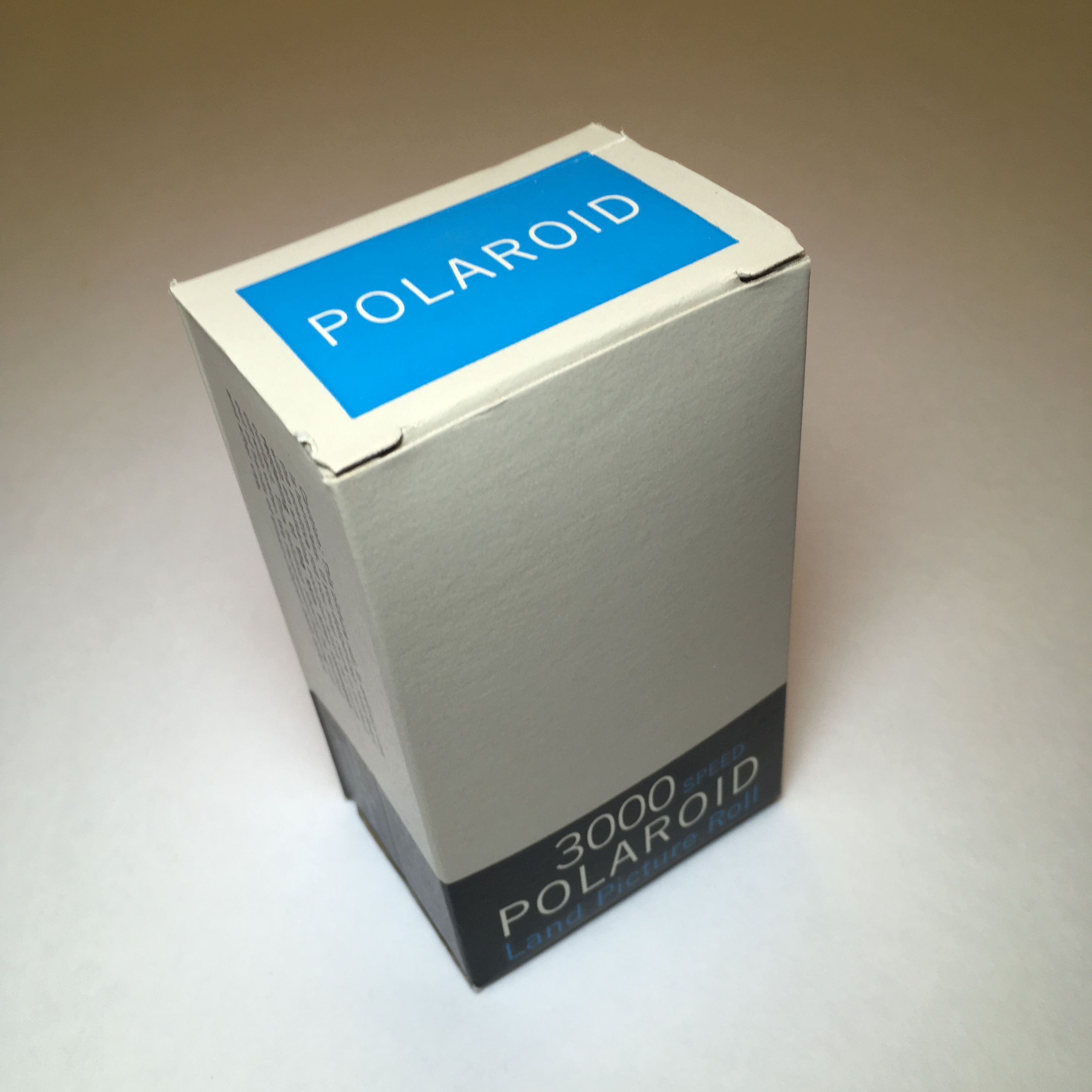
Polaroid 3000 Speed Type 47 Rollfilm Expired June 1962

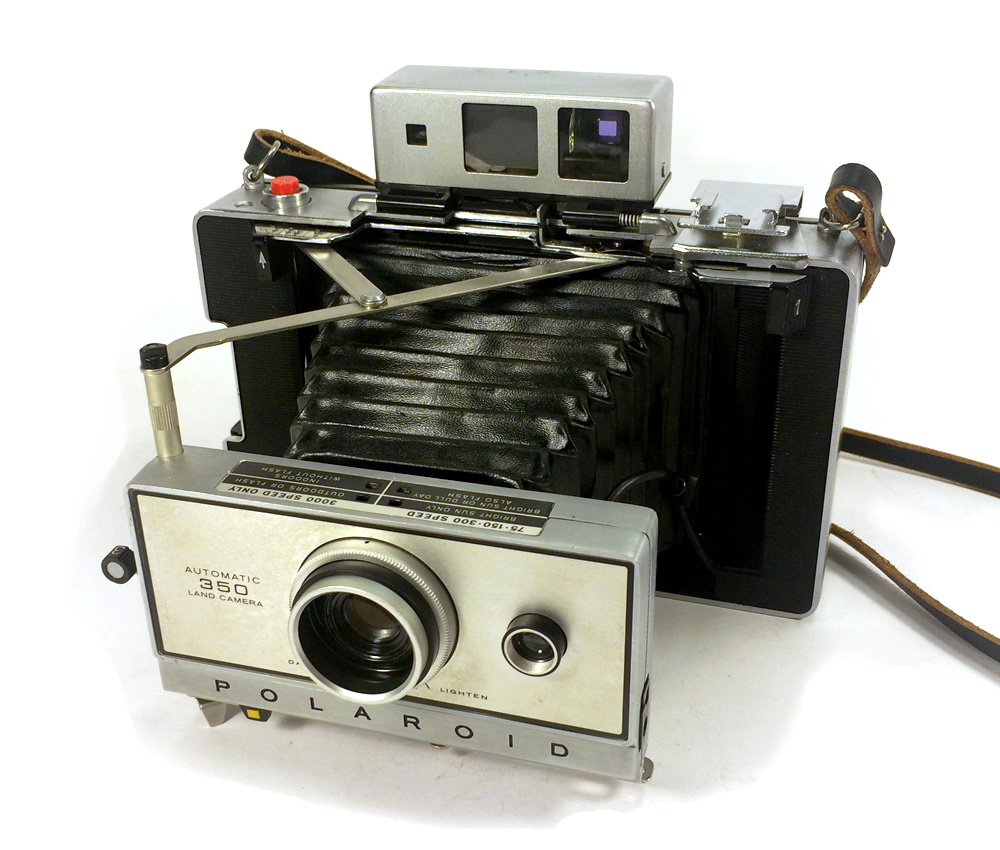
Polaroid Automatic 350 instant camera, made from 1969 to 1971, MSRP $150

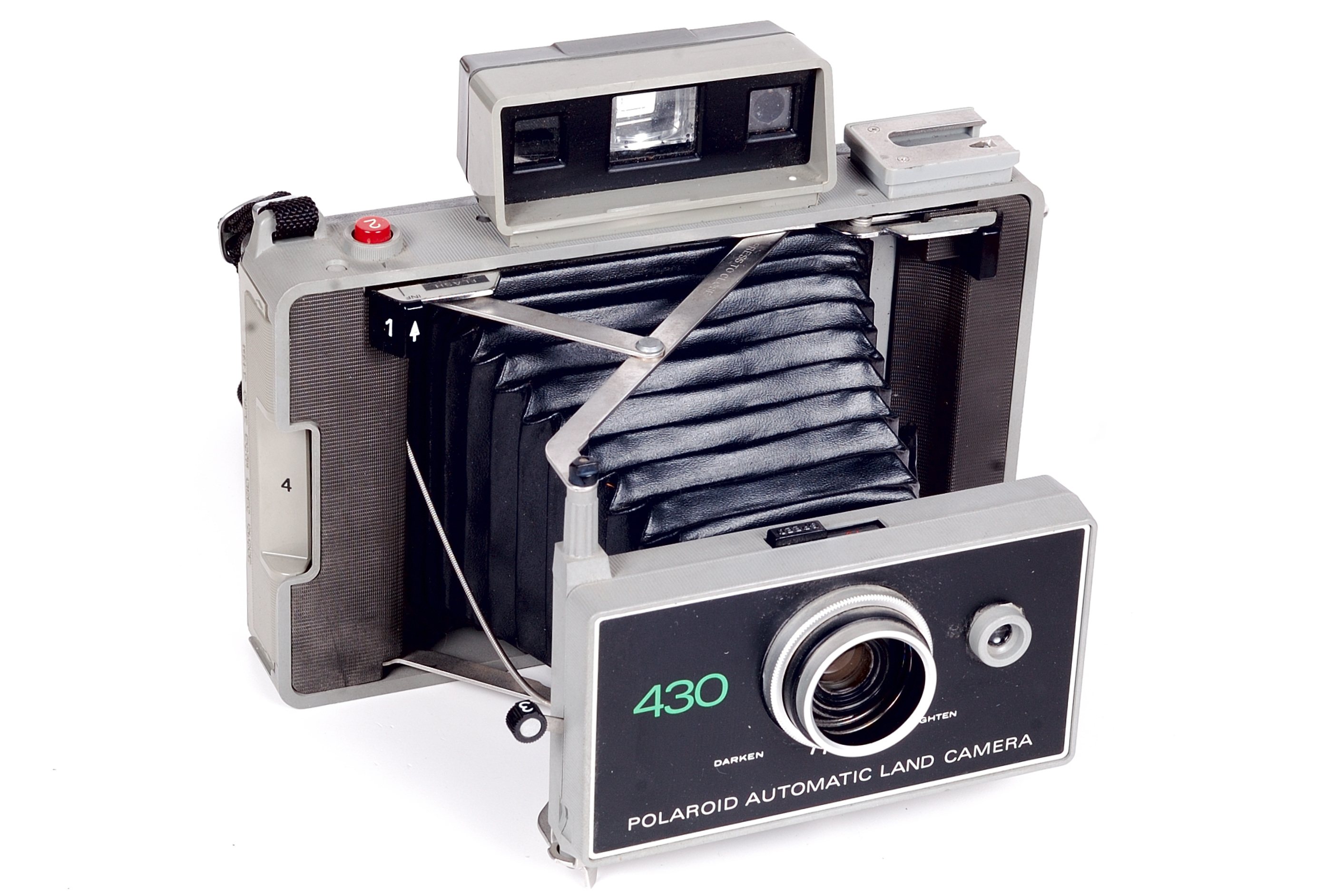
Polaroid Automatic 430 Land Camera

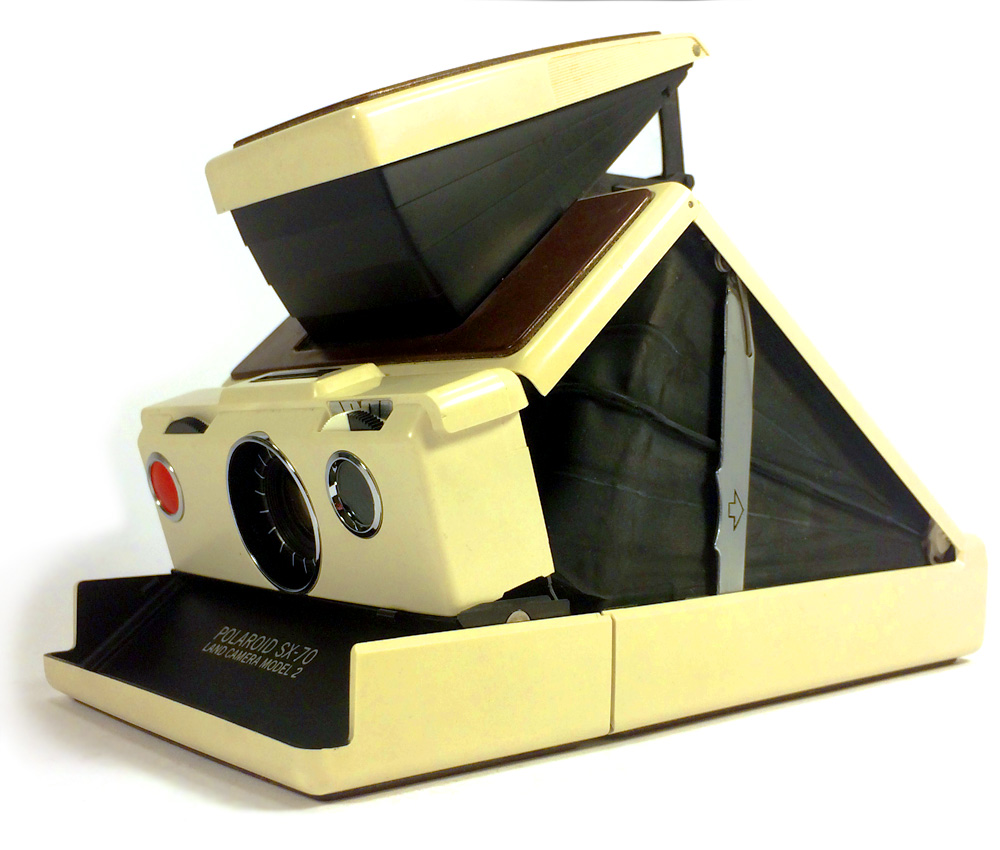
Polaroid SX-70 Land Camera model 2 instant camera, made in the USA circa 1972 to 1974

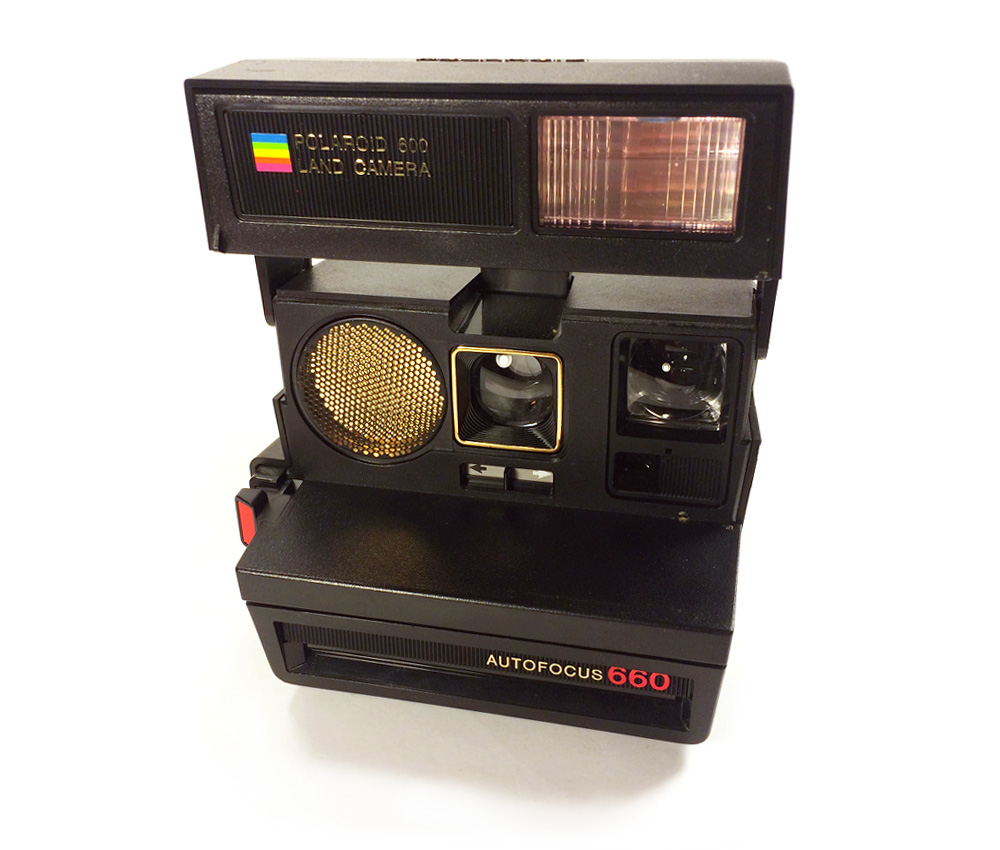
Polaroid Sun Autofocus 660 instant camera, circa 1987

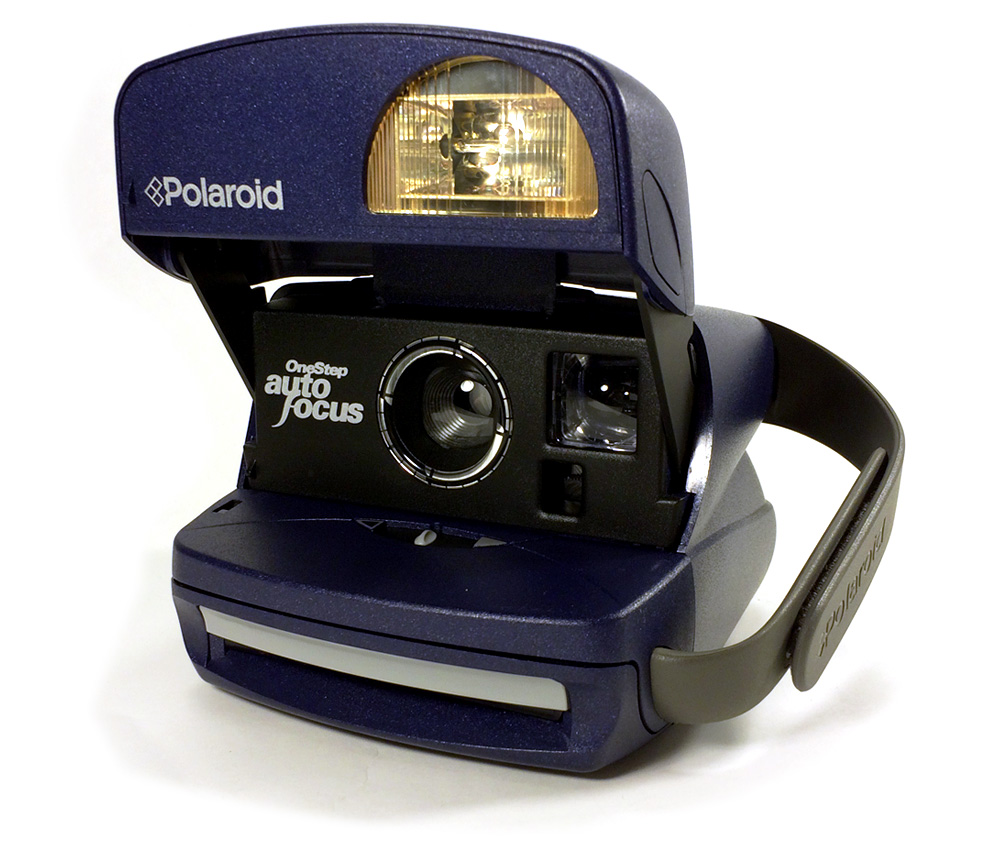
Polaroid OneStep Autofocus SE instant camera, made in the United Kingdom circa 1997

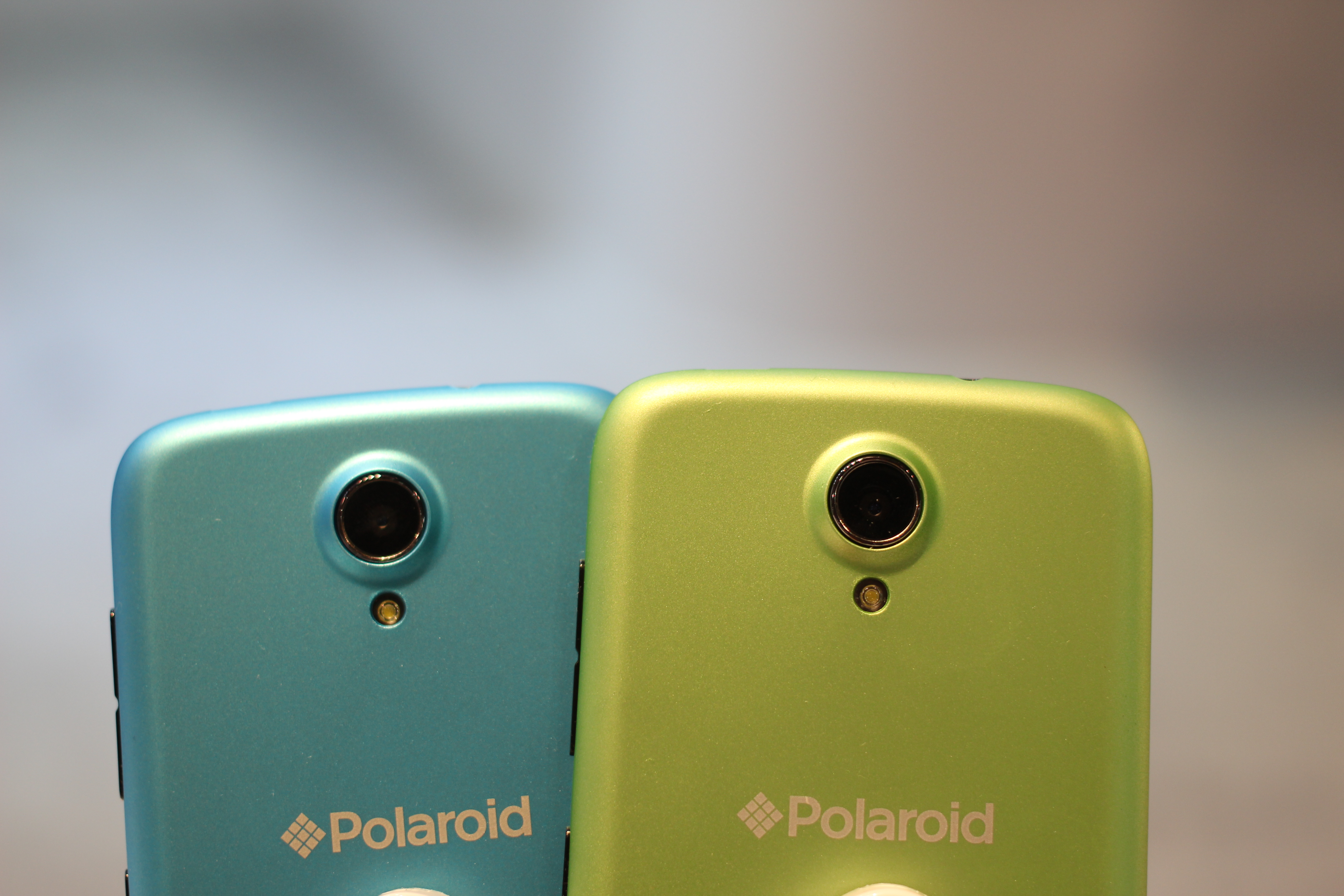
Polaroid Snap Android smartphone

The original Polaroid Corporation was founded in Cambridge, Massachusetts, by Edwin Land and George W. Wheelwright III in 1937. It has been described by The Boston Globe as a "juggernaut of innovation", and "the Apple of its time" with a "leader in Edwin Land, a scientist who guided the company as the founding CEO for four decades". Polaroid’s initial market was in polarized sunglasses — spawned from Land’s self-guided research in light polarization. Land, having completed his freshman year at Harvard University, left to pursue this market, resulting in Polaroid's birth. Land later returned to Harvard to continue his research. Polaroid, owning patents to its polarizer technology, got its start by employing polarization in products that included 3D movies and protective goggles for military dogs. During World War II, Polaroid designed and manufactured numerous products for the armed services including an infrared night viewing device. He led the company as CEO for 43 years. He headed the Polaroid Corporation, developing it from a small research and marketing firm into a well-known high-tech company. Kodak was a customer for some of Land's polarizing products.

Recognized by most as the father of instant photography, he included all the operations of a darkroom inside the film itself. He gave the first public demonstration of his new Land Camera in February 1947. Polaroid commercially released the Land Camera Model 95 in November 1948 at the Jordan Marsh department store in Boston. By 1950, about 4,400 dealers across the United States were selling Polaroid cameras and film products. The company also introduced a true black-and-white instant film in 1950, and continued to improve the quality of its instant photography system during the following decade. Polaroid introduced Polacolor, its instant color film, in 1963, and its film sales increased sixfold over the following decade.

From the introduction of the Land Camera until 1972, the user had to release the film manually, pull a tab, and peel the negative from the finished positive print—the first version to eliminate these intermediate steps was the SX-70 of 1972, which ejected the print automatically. Land was pictured on the cover of Life magazine in 1972 with the inscription, "A Genius and His Magic Camera". The technical aspects of Polaroid's products are described in Instant film.

In the 1940s, Polaroid purchased the B B Chemical Company building at 784 Memorial Drive in Cambridge, Massachusetts for its headquarters. The landmark Streamline Moderne style structure would be added to the National Register of Historic Places listings in Cambridge, Massachusetts in 1982.

A major technological milestone occurred in 1972 with the introduction of the SX-70 Land Camera, the first Fully integrated instant SLR camera using self-developing "integral film." Unlike earlier peel-apart systems, SX-70 film developed automatically inside a sealed print without user intervention, producing a fully finished image in daylight conditions. This design eliminated chemical handling and marked a shift toward fully automated consumer imaging.

When Kodak announced instant film cameras in 1976, Polaroid announced it was suing them, accusing Kodak of having stolen its patented instant photography process. In the two years that followed the lawsuit, total sales of instant cameras climbed from 7.4 million cameras in 1976 to 10.3 million in 1977 and 14.3 million in 1978. The suit in federal court lasted 10 years. Polaroid asked for $12 billion for infringements of its patents by Kodak. The court ruled in favor of Polaroid and ordered Kodak to cease instant picture production, plus pay Polaroid $909.5 million of the $12 billion it had asked for.

=== Decline ===
In 1977, Land introduced the Polaroid Instant Home Movie camera named Polavision, based on the Dufaycolor process. However, the product arrived on the market when videotape-based systems were rapidly gaining popularity. Thus it failed to sell well in retail stores and has been described as the swan song for Polaroid. After four decades as chairman, Edwin Land was coerced into resigning and leaving the corporation he had founded. He died in 1991. The Polavision debacle eventually caused the company to write off $89 million, including most of the manufactured products. The underlying technology of Polavision was later improved for use in the Polachrome instant slide film system.

William J. McCune Jr was appointed chief executive officer in 1980. He joined the company in 1939, two years after its founding. He led the company until late 1985 when I. M. Booth, 54, was appointed as Polaroid’s chief executive, McCune remained chairman.

In the 1980s, Polaroid tried to reinvent itself without Land at its helm by shifting away from a dependence on consumer photography, a market that was in steady decline. In 1984 Polaroid announced "that it would enter the United States electronic video market with its own line of Polaroid videotapes."

Polaroid was forced to make wholesale changes that included having to fire thousands of workers and close many factories. The 1980s saw the advent of new technologies that profoundly changed the world of photography — one-hour color film processing, single-use cameras from competitors, videotape camcorders, and, in the 1990s and 2000s, digital cameras.

The company was in fact one of the early manufacturers of digital cameras, with the PDC-2000 in 1996; however, it failed to capture a large market share in that segment.

It also made 35 mm and multi-format scanners, such as Polaroid SprintScan 4000 35 mm scanner (the first scanner with a 4000 DPI CCD) in 1999, and the Polaroid PrintScan 120 in 2000. The scanners received mixed reviews and saw heavy competition from Nikon and Minolta products. The entire line was discontinued when Polaroid entered bankruptcy in 2001.

Prior to bankruptcy, the company sold its landmark, historic headquarters building and surrounding property to The Bulfinch Companies for $10 million.

=== Bankruptcy (2001) ===
The original Polaroid Corporation filed for federal Chapter 11 bankruptcy protection on October 11, 2001. The outcome was that within ten months, most of the business (including the "Polaroid" name itself and non-bankrupt foreign subsidiaries) had been sold to Bank One's One Equity Partners (OEP). OEP Imaging Corporation then changed its name to Polaroid Holding Company (PHC). However, this new company operated using the name of its bankrupt predecessor, Polaroid Corporation.

Significant criticism surrounded this "takeover" because the process left executives of the company with large bonuses, while stockholders, as well as current and retired employees, were left with nothing. The company announced a plan that gave the top 45 executives bonuses just for staying at their jobs. Meanwhile, other employees were restricted from selling their stock before leaving their jobs.

As part of the settlement, the original Polaroid Corporation changed its name to Primary PDC, Inc. Having sold its assets, it was now effectively nothing more than an administrative shell. Primary PDC received approximately 35 percent of the "new" Polaroid, which was to be distributed to its unsecured creditors (including bondholders). As of late 2006, Primary PDC remained in existence under Chapter 11 bankruptcy protection, but conducted no commercial business and had no employees.

Polaroid’s bankruptcy is widely attributed to the failure of senior management — unable to anticipate the impact of digital cameras on its film business. This type of managerial failure is also known as the success trap.

=== Use of Polaroid brand and assets following bankruptcy ===
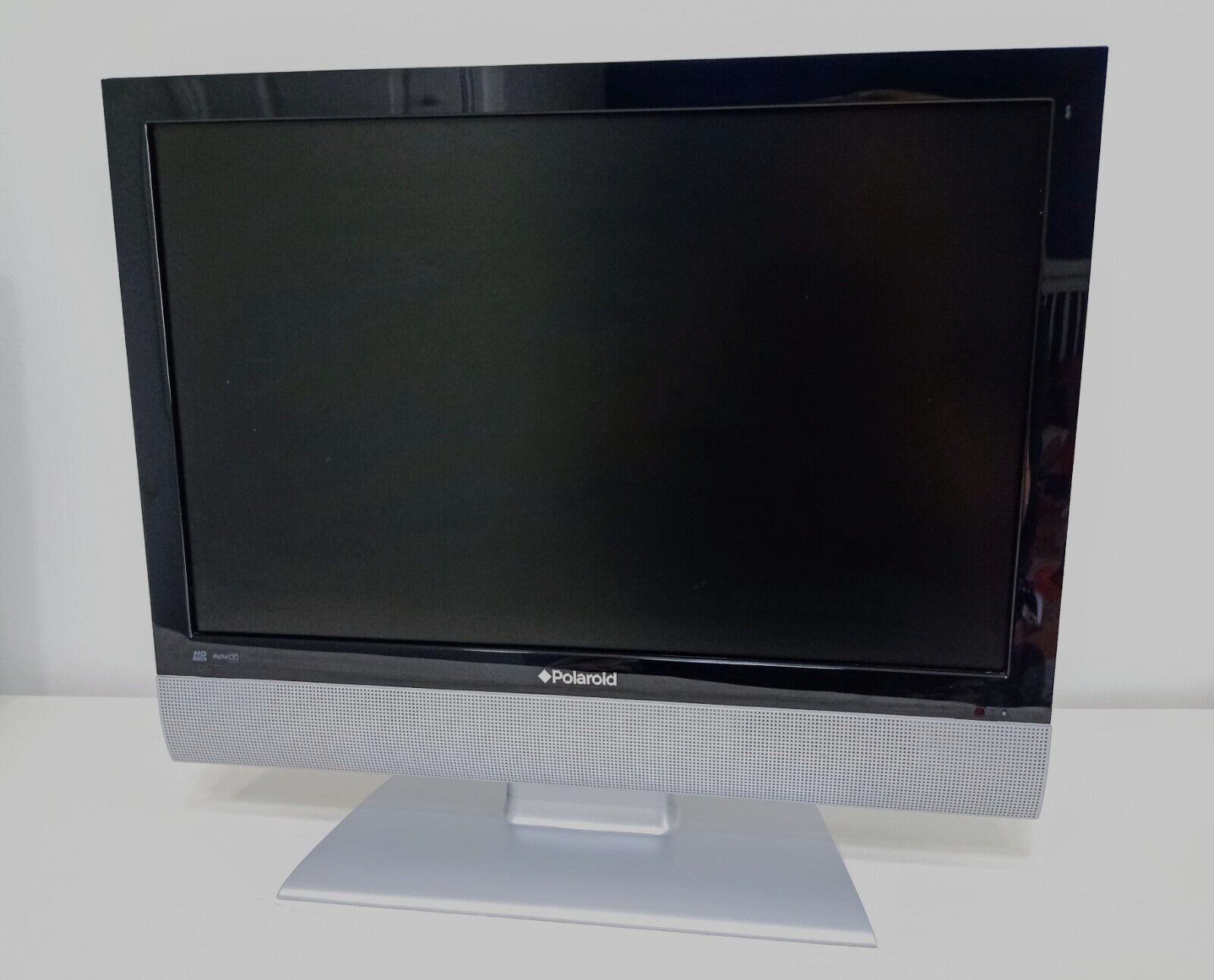
A Polaroid branded TV set from c. 2010

After the bankruptcy, the Polaroid brand was licensed for use on other products with the assistance of Skadden, Arps, Slate, Meagher & Flom. In September 2002, World Wide Licenses, a subsidiary of The Character Group plc, was granted the exclusive rights for three years to manufacture and sell digital cameras under the Polaroid brand for distribution internationally. Polaroid branded LCDs and plasma televisions and portable DVD players had also appeared on the market.

On April 27, 2005, Petters Group Worldwide announced its acquisition of PHC. Petters has in the past bought up failed companies with well-known names for the value of those names. The same year, Flextronics purchased Polaroid's manufacturing operations and the decision was made to send most of the manufacturing to China. It stopped making Polaroid cameras in 2007 and discontinued the sale of Polaroid film after 2009 to the dismay of loyal consumers. On December 18, 2008, the post-reorganization Polaroid Corp. filed for Chapter 11 bankruptcy protection in U.S. Bankruptcy Court for the District of Minnesota. The bankruptcy filing came shortly after the criminal investigation of its parent company, Petters Group Worldwide, and the parent company founder, Tom Petters.

==== Auction for Polaroid Corporation's assets ====
On April 2, 2009, Patriarch Partners won an auction for Polaroid Corporation's assets including the company's name, intellectual property, and photography collection. Patriarch's $59.1 million bid beat bids from PHC Acquisitions, Hilco Consumer Capital Corp and Ritchie Capital.

This led to some very contentious fighting and litigation, and Patriarch wound up walking away in early May 2009, and a joint venture between Gordon Brothers Brands LLC and Hilco Consumer Capital LP picked up the pieces. According to a Reuters report:

The move by New York-based Patriarch, a private-equity firm, [to drop their claim], follows US District Judge James Rosenbaum's ruling on Thursday in Minneapolis that putting the purchase on hold during appeal would threaten operations at Polaroid, which is spending its cash at a rate of $3 million a month.

On April 16, 2009, Polaroid won US Bankruptcy Court approval to be sold to a joint venture of Hilco Consumer Capital LP of Toronto and Gordon Brothers Brands LLC of Boston.

Hilco Consumer Capital and Gordon Brothers Brands announced the closing of the purchase of Polaroid Corporation on May 7, 2009, placing Polaroid Corporation in joint holding under a parent company named PLR IP Holdings, LLC. Former executive vice president and general manager – Americas, Scott W. Hardy was named as the new president of Polaroid Corporation and PLR IP Holdings, LLC. The majority of employees remained in their positions at the company's Minnetonka, Minnesota headquarters as well as office locations in Boston, New York and Toronto.

On June 19, 2009, the new holding corporation for Polaroid, PLR IP Holdings, LLC announced an exclusive 5-year agreement with Summit Global Group to produce and distribute Polaroid-branded digital still cameras, digital video cameras, digital photo frames and PoGo-branded mobile products. Summit Global Group added several former Polaroid employees to their staff. The company expects the agreement to yield $1.3 billion in retail sales over an unspecified period beginning in 2009.

On January 5, 2010, Polaroid appointed Lady Gaga as "Creative Director" for the company. A press release stated that she would be the "new face" of Polaroid. In a 2014 interview an account supervisor at R&J Public Relations, the PR firm for Polaroid, stated that the company is no longer working with Lady Gaga.

=== 2017–present: Acquisition by Smołokowski; collaboration with and rebranding of "Impossible" ===
In 2017, the holding corporation for Polaroid, PLR IP Holdings, LLC, was acquired by Polish investor Wiaczesław "Slava" Smołokowski. Smołokowski was already the largest shareholder in the Impossible Project—a company formed to continue production of Polaroid-compatible film after Polaroid themselves left the market—having been persuaded to invest in it by his son Oskar. The acquisition brought both companies under the control of the Smołokowski family.

The Impossible Project (already led by Oskar Smołokowski) was rebranded as Polaroid Originals, with the last factory producing Polaroid-compatible instant film cartridges in Enschede, Netherlands being rebranded under the new name later in 2017.

In March 2019, the new polaroid.com website listed instant cameras and supplies made by Polaroid Originals alongside its other products including digital cameras, sunglasses, the Cube action camera, and television units.

March 2020, Polaroid Originals rebranded as simply Polaroid, with the Polaroid Now being the first instant film camera in years to have the Polaroid branding.

In April 2021, Polaroid introduced the Polaroid Go, described by the company as the world's smallest analog instant camera, together with a new miniature instant film format.

In September 2023, Polaroid released the Polaroid I-2, its first premium instant camera with built-in manual controls. The I-2 featured a three-lens continuous autofocus system and was designed as a high-end model aimed at experienced instant photography users.

==== Efforts to preserve and restore vintage Polaroid camera models ====
Polaroid B.V. and other companies, including MiNT Camera (manufacturer of the reusable MiNT flash bar), refurbish and repair classic Polaroid products, with some companies modifying the hardware itself to add additional functionality. One such modification is the conversion of Polaroid SX-70 camera models to use the more common, and higher-ISO Polaroid 600 film.

== Controversy ==
In 1970, Caroline Hunter and her co-worker, future husband Ken Williams, discovered the involvement of their employer, Polaroid, in the South African apartheid system as the producer of the passbook photos used to identify Black individuals in South Africa. To pressure Polaroid to divest from South Africa, Hunter and Williams created the Polaroid Revolutionary Worker Movement (PRWM). Through the PRWM, Hunter and Williams organized a boycott against the corporation. Consequently, Polaroid banned all sales to the government, including the military and police, and promised to raise wages and increase job training at its distributors. The plan did not pacify the PRWM, however, and, in 1971, Hunter testified before the United Nations advocating a boycott of Polaroid products. Polaroid proceeded to fire both Hunter and Williams. As a result of protests, a community group in Boston donated $10,000 it received from Polaroid to South African liberation movements. In 1977, it became public Polaroid film was being sold by the distributor Frank and Hirsch to the South African government for use in the "passbook" in violation of Polaroid's policy. This ended Polaroid's relationship with its distributor and all direct sales to South Africa.

== Other ventures ==
=== Polaroid Floppy disks (diskettes) ===
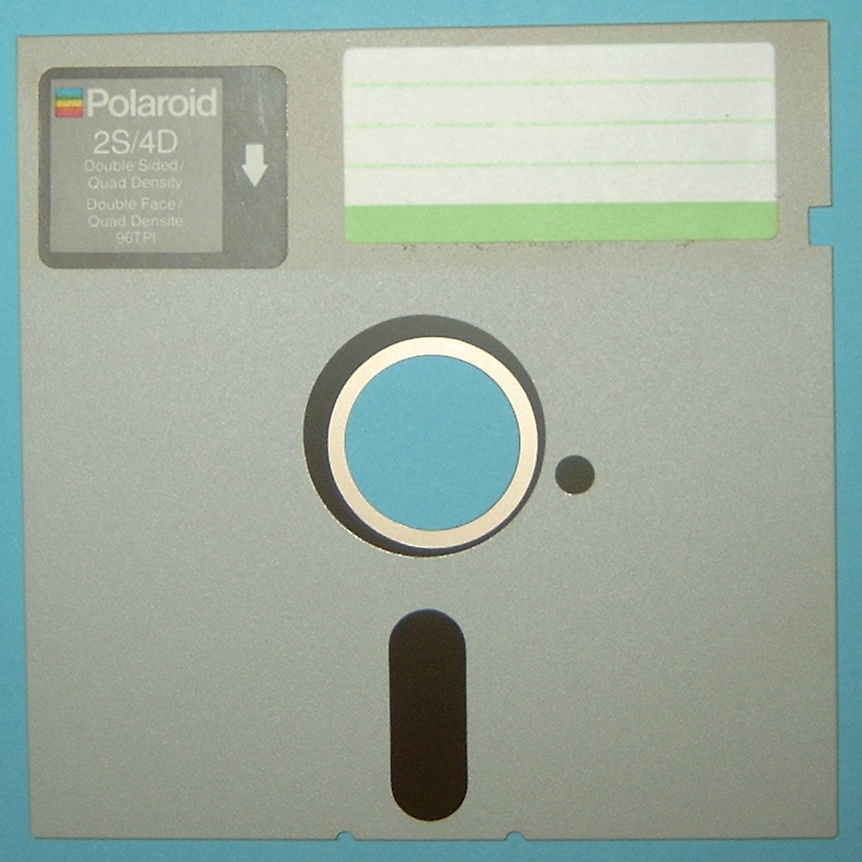
Polaroid 5 1/4-inch floppy disk

In 1985, Polaroid had its own brand of 5 1/4-inch floppy disks, and also a data recovery service. In 1987, The New York Times described it as a major brand. In 1985, The New York Times listed it a notch lower in an almost reverse alphabetical list, and noted "remember that those companies established their reputations by selling other products, not diskettes."

By mid 1991, they stopped selling floppy disks. The packaging used both Polaroid and PerfectData brands

=== Corporate sponsorship of motorsports ===
In the 1990s, Polaroid was involved in corporate sponsorship of NASCAR. For several years, Polaroid was the principal sponsor of NASCAR's 125 mile Featherlite Modified race at Watkins Glen and it was called the "Polaroid 125". The Polaroid name was also used in sponsorship in the NASCAR Busch Series. In 1992, Polaroid was the principal sponsor of female NASCAR driver Shawna Robinson's #25 Oldsmobile in the Busch Series. They continued as her principal sponsor when she moved to the other car numbers in 1993 and 1994.

Polaroid formerly sponsored the Target Chip Ganassi entry of Juan Pablo Montoya's #42 Chevy Impala in the NASCAR Sprint Cup Series and entries in the IRL Indy Car Series, including the car driven by Dario Franchitti.

The Polaroid name has also been associated with the NOPI drift series. Polaroid was the principal sponsor of the Nissan 350Z driven by Nick Bollea in the 2007 season.

=== Discontinuation and relaunch of Polaroid film ===
On February 8, 2008, Polaroid (under the control of Thomas J. Petters of Petters Group Worldwide) announced that the company had decided to gradually cease production and withdraw from analog instant film products completely in 2008. Since March 2010, instant film materials for vintage Polaroid cameras have again become available on the market, developed and manufactured by a group called The Impossible Project, at the former Polaroid production plant in Enschede, Netherlands.

Austrian photographer Florian Kaps, the owner of the largest online vendor for SX-70 films and organizer of the web-based instant photo gallery Polanoid.net, had bought the approximately 500,000 film packages that were in stock. He teamed with André Bosman, a former head of film production in the large Polaroid film factory at Enschede, designed a plan to redesign the SX-70/600 film system in collaboration with Ilford Photo, and convinced the Polaroid owners to participate. Plans for a relaunch under the Impossible label were announced in January 2009. Buildings in the Enschede plant, which had produced 30 million film packs in 2007 and 24 million in the first half of 2008, were leased to the company created by Kaps, who by May 2009 had raised $2.6 million from friends and family for what he had named The Impossible Project.

On March 22, 2010, Impossible announced the release of two monochromatic films, PX100 and PX600, compatible with SX-70 and 600 type cameras, respectively. Color films were initially released in 2010 for SX-70 type cameras, followed in 2011 with the release of much improved color films for Polaroid 600, SX-70 and Spectra Cameras.

Then Impossible had originally announced a new camera that was going to be styled after older Polaroid models to coincide with the new film. The camera was due to come out before Christmas 2010, but the deadline passed with no new information on the camera. In April 2016, Impossible released the Impossible I-1; however, it was not styled after older Polaroid cameras. It was the first camera to use I-type Film and was backwards compatible with 600 Film due to I-type film being 600 film without a battery. After rebranding to Polaroid Originals, the company released another camera in September 2017 called the OneStep 2. This camera was modeled after the original OneStep with new features as originally planned, though the OneStep 2 uses the same type of film as the Impossible I-1 unlike the OneStep that used SX-70 Film.

On April 28, 2012, the documentary "Time Zero: The Last Year of Polaroid Film", directed by Grant Hamilton, was released in the U.S. It covers the rise, fall, and grass-roots revival of Polaroid's instant film technology.

In 2017, the documentary Instant Dreams, directed by Willem Baptist, was released in the U.S. and Europe. It portrayed the story of those who eagerly await the rebirth of the classic, recognizable Polaroid photo and of scientists who are trying to unravel the secrets of its chemical formula.

=== Mobile printers ===
In summer 2008 Polaroid released the PoGo, an instant photo printer producing 2 by 3 inches (51 mm × 76 mm) prints. It uses the Zink ("zero ink") technology which is similar to dye sublimation but has the dye crystals embedded in the photo paper itself. Models CZA-10011B and CZA-20011B exist (which Polaroid claim to be identical).

In 2009, the CZA-05300B PoGo, a 5 megapixel digital camera integrated with a Zink printer, was released.

In 2011, the company released the Polaroid GL10 Instant Mobile Printer producing 3 by 4 inch prints. The printer, designed by Polaroid and Lady Gaga, allows people to print directly from a mobile phone or digital camera. This product is the first product in the new Polaroid Grey Label line.

=== Digital photography ===
Polaroid released a line of cameras without printers including the t1035, a 10-megapixel digital camera.

In January 2012, Polaroid announced a new "smart camera", entitled the Polaroid SC1630 smart camera, which is powered by Google Android. The SC1630 is a combination of a camera and a portable media player, that allows users to take photos with a built-in 16 MP HD camera, download apps from Google Play, check their email, and browse the web. The built-in camera allows 3X optical zoom. Other features on the media player include Wi-Fi, touch screen, geotagging, smart albums, and 32 GB of storage via a micro SD card.

In September 2014 Polaroid introduced a $99 action camera named the "Polaroid Cube", marketed as an alternative to cameras such as the GoPro Hero (which retails for $129), specifically for casual, light users of action camcorders. In 2015 GoPro released the similar GoPro HERO4 Session.

=== Wideblue ===
In March 2006, the specialist design and development department in Polaroid's Vale of Leven plant in Scotland was bought out by its management team. Known as Wideblue the company specializes in helping small technology based companies develop products and manufacturing processes.

In 2014 Wideblue was hired to design the Impossible Project mass market instant camera.

== See also ==
- List of Polaroid instant cameras
- Polacolor
- Polaroid (polarizer) – a light-polarizing material developed by Edwin H. Land
- Polaroid Eyewear
- Success trap
- Zink (printing)
