= DohVinci =

Da-Vinci inspired art made with Play-Doh

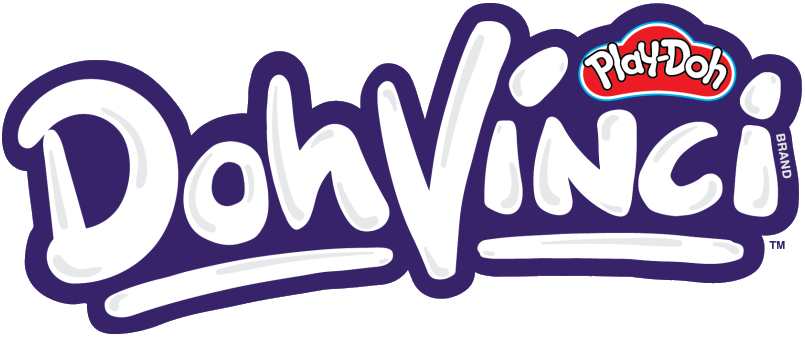
- Invented by: Arleth
- Company: Hasbro
- Country: United States
- Availability: 2014–present

Doh-Vinci is a Hasbro arts and craft toy which combines Play-Doh with 3D printing. The kits include a soft form of Play-Doh, a 3D styling tool and a base such as a vanity set for the children to decorate. The Play-Doh comes in tubes which fit into the styling tool and are then extruded from a nozzle to make shapes in a similar manner to frosting cakes. It is similar to the 3Doodler except uses Play-Doh instead of plastic.

== See also ==
- Play-Doh
- 3Doodler
