= Stefanie Schneider =

German photographer

Stefanie Schneider (born 1968) is a German photographer living in Berlin and Los Angeles. Schneider's photographs exhibit the appearance of expired Polaroid instant film, with its chemical mutations. It has been released in books and exhibition catalogs, and in her feature film 29 Palms, CA (2014). Her work has also been used as the cover art for music by Red Hot Chili Peppers and Cyndi Lauper, and in the film Stay (2005).

== Life and work ==
Schneider has made covers for the Red Hot Chili Peppers single "Desecration Smile" (2006) and Cyndi Lauper's Bring Ya to the Brink album (2008). She produced all the artwork in the 2005 film Stay directed by Marc Forster, for the character played by Ryan Gosling. The film's end credits were also made using expired Polaroid film.

Schneider plays the artist in the 2017 documentary film Instant Dreams by Willem Baptist.

== Publications ==
Stranger Than Paradise (2006)

- Wastelands. Edition Braus, 2006. Edited by Thomas Schirmböck. ISBN 3-89904-211-5. With essays by James Scarborough, Megan Mullally, Mark Gisbourne, and Renée Chabria. Edition of 50 copies
- 29 Palms, CA. 2004. ISBN 3-937623-04-3. With an essay by Stefan Gronert, "The Greater The Emptiness The Grander The Art". Edition of 350 copies. Edited by Galerie Kämpf, Basel
- Stranger Than Paradise. Hatje Cantz, 2006. Edited by Dominique A. Faix, Noëlle Stahel, and Daniela Bosshardt. ISBN 3-7757-1751-X. In German and English.
- 29 Palms, CA. Pocket Polaroid Series #004. Berlin: Schwarzer Freitag. ISBN 978-3-937623-04-7.
- Instantdreams. Pocket Polaroid Series #004. Avenso, 2014. ISBN 978-3-935971-69-0.In German, English and French.
