= Willem Baptist =

- Born: 1979 (age 46–47); Netherlands
- Education: Willem de Kooning Academy
- Occupations: Filmmaker, documentary director, film producer
- Years active: 2009–present
- Notable work: I'm Never Afraid! (2010); Wild Boar (2013); Instant Dreams (2017)
- Awards: Golden Gate Award – San Francisco International Film Festival (2012) for I'm Never Afraid!

Willem Baptist (born 1979) is a Dutch filmmaker, documentary-director and film producer.

== Career ==
He graduated from Willem de Kooning Academy in 2009, having received notable prizes for his studentshorts.

His documentary I’m Never Afraid! (2010) won a Golden Gate Award at San Francisco International Film Festival, Documentary Short Grand Jury Prize at Atlanta Film Festival, and a Kinderkast Jury award non-fiction at Cinekid Festival. His documentary Wild Boar (2013) premiered at Hot Docs, AFI Docs, and Visions du Réel, where it was awarded a Special Mention for best short film.

In 2016 Imposible Magazine reported Baptist was shooting a documentary titled Instant Dreams in Berlin and Los Angeles. The same year, the feature film Young Wrestlers, he co-wrote and was directed by Mete Gümürhan, received a Special Mention from the jury at the Berlin International Film Festival.

Instant Dreams premiered at the International Documentary Film Festival Amsterdam in 2017, where it competed in the First Appearance Competition. The European premiere was at Visions du Reel. In the United States the film premiered at Slamdance Film Festival. The film was internationally released; theatrically and on streaming platforms. Instant Dreams was nominated for a Golden Calf, Rose d'Or, Doc Alliance-award and holds a positive score on Rotten Tomatoes, rating it ‘fresh’ based on critic reviews.

In 2018 The Saugatuck Center for the Arts, present the Midwest premiere of the Instant Dreams documentary at 7 p.m. Friday, October 19, and was a feature an on-site Polaroid portrait studio in the lobby.

From 2007 to 2013, he was co-owner of production company Kaliber Film. Since 2014, he has been co-founder and co-owner of Tangerine Tree, a Rotterdam-based production company in the Netherlands.
