= New Media Award =

The New Media Award may refer to:

- A category of the International Media Awards, London, UK
- A category of the Freedom of Expression Awards by the Index on Censorship organization, London, UK
- An award by the New Statesman magazine, London, UK
- A category of the National Cartoonists Society Division Awards, US
- A category of the Korea Drama Awards
- An award by The Economist magazine
- An award by Veterans of Foreign Wars, US
- BAFTA "New Media Award"
- Cinekid New Media Award
