= Polaroid Collection =

Defunct photography collection

The Polaroid Collection was a collection of fine-art photographs assembled by the Polaroid Corporation. The collection was initiated in the 1940s by Ansel Adams and Edwin Land. Following the company's 2008 bankruptcy, the collection was broken up for sale in 2010.

== History ==
Beginning in the 1940s, the Polaroid Corporation hired noted artists to test their film and cameras, and then acquired some of the results. In 1949, Polaroid's founder Edwin Land hired one of these photographers, Ansel Adams, to consult on the collection. Adams remained a consultant to the collection for 35 years.

By the 1960s, Land's informal offers to artists to use the company's equipment and film eventually evolved into its Artists Support Program, which also provided access to its dedicated 20×24 inch Polaroid camera studio. Selected artists were also able to borrow the cameras to use outside of the Polaroid 20x24 studio. The artists in turn provided the Polaroid Collection with examples of the work they produced using Polaroid's technology.

In parallel with Land and Adams' work on the collection, and the photographs produced by the Artist's Support Program, Polaroid's European branch also purchased photographs by photographers such as David Bailey, Sarah Moon, Helmut Newton and Josef Sudek under the name of the International Polaroid Collection. In 1990 the two collections were merged.

The Polaroid Collection grew to include works by Dorothea Lange, Margaret Bourke-White, Edward Weston, Imogen Cunningham, William Garnett and Adams himself.

== Dissolution ==
=== American sale ===
Following the second bankruptcy of the Polaroid Corporation in 2008, 1200 of the 16,000 photographs in the American-held portion of the collection were sold at auction in 2010 by order of the United States Bankruptcy Court for the District of Minnesota. Some controversy followed the decision to auction the works, as several artists said that they had lent or given their work to the collection with the expectation that it would remain in the collection in perpetuity.

The auction was very successful, generating $12.4 million USD. Some works were sold for record-setting values; Ansel Adams' Clearing Winter Storm, Yosemite National Park sold for a $722,000 USD, the highest ever paid for an Adams work at the time.

=== European sale ===
In 2011 the Westlicht Museum in Vienna, in collaboration with the Impossible Project, acquired a cache of 4400 prints from the collection that had been stored in Lausanne's Musée de l'Élysée. The two organizations paid $705,000 USD for the prints, which included works by Marina Abramović and Ulay, Ansel Adams, Walker Evans, Chuck Close, David Hockney and Andy Warhol. 1400 of the photos in the European sale were 20x24 inch Polaroids that had been produced under Land's Artists Support Program.
