= Moritz de Hadeln =

Swiss documentary film director and critic (1940–2026)

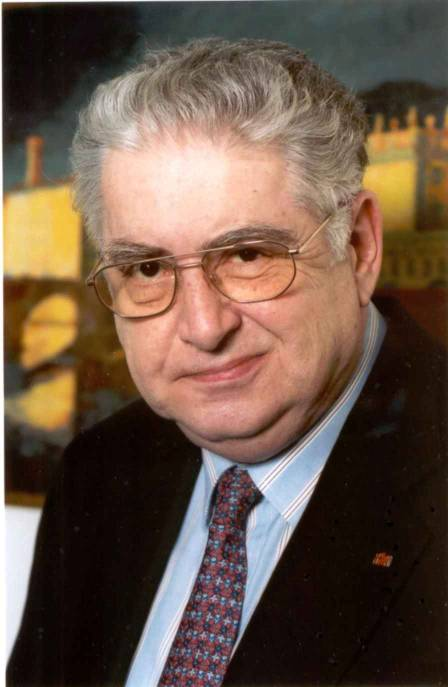
- Born: 21 December 1940; Exeter, Devon, England
- Died: 4 July 2026 (aged 85); Nyon, Vaud, Switzerland
- Occupations: Film director, film critic, photographer
- Years active: 1963–2026

Moritz de Hadeln (21 December 1940 – 4 July 2026) was a Swiss documentary film director and photographer who became a film festival director. He was the founder of the Swiss documentary film festival Visions du Réel. De Hadeln also headed the Locarno International Film Festival from 1972 to 1977, the Berlin International Film Festival from 1980 to 2001 and the Venice International Film Festival in 2002 and 2003. He was also a member of the jury at the 23rd Moscow International Film Festival.

== Life and career ==
Born on 21 December 1940 in Exeter, Devon, England, de Hadeln's European family background provided him with a unique education in the Arts. His grandfather Detlev Freiherr von Hadeln was an art historian, his father Harry founded an art edition company in Florence (Italy) and his mother Alexandra Bălăceanu, a Romanian immigrant, was a painter and sculptor. After obtaining the French Certificate A level (Baccalauréat), de Hadeln started studying physics and chemistry in Paris. He soon joined the film research laboratory Avenue Hoch as an apprentice. After freelancing as a photographer for some years, de Hadeln was given the opportunity to direct his first documentary Le Pèlé in 1963. Followed several years of work with cinematographer Ernest Artaria in Zurich. In 1966, de Hadeln directed his second film Ombres et Mirages and during this same period, worked as a film editor in Zürich together with Yves Allégret and as assistant director at CCC Film Studios in Berlin.

De Hadeln married Erika von dem Hagen in 1968. In 1969, Moritz de Hadeln and his wife founded the Nyon International Documentary Film Festival (today Visions du Réel film festival) in Switzerland, which he directed until 1979. He assisted Erika when she took over as head of the festival from 1981 to 1993. In those 25 years, they made Nyon a unique meeting place for documentary filmmaking while discovering many new talents. From 1972 to 1977, de Hadeln headed the Locarno International Film Festival, heralding a new era of international recognition for the event. He gave an original profile to the newly introduced outdoor screening on the Piazza Grande and introduced several sidebar events to broaden the festival's international impact.

In 1979, de Hadeln was invited to head the Berlin International Film Festival. His aim was to establish the German event as one of the “best organized festivals in the world” by introducing among other as first festival in the world the use of computer technology for the data processing of the event. In the early 1980s, in spite of the ongoing Cold War situation in the divided city, he managed to bring East and West together at the festival. Together with Beki Probst, he founded the European Film Market. Tireless world traveller, de Hadeln was one of the first to discover the newly emerging Chinese cinema. As the Berlin Wall fell in 1989 and German unity was restored in 1990, de Hadeln was quick in seizing the opportunity to make the festival one of the most prestigious meeting places of the newly born German capital. After years of detailed planning, in 2000, he successfully managed to relocate the event in the newly rebuilt Potsdamer Platz, the historical heart of the town, while giving to the festival a new corporate identity.

In May 2001, Moritz de Hadeln founded in Berlin together with his wife Erika "de Hadeln & Partners", a company specialising in film consulting and event management. In March 2002, as first ever non-Italian, Moritz de Hadeln was invited to head the Venice International Film Festival (the Mostra Internazionale d'Arte Cinematografica) – part of the Venice Biennale. He directed only the two events in 2002 and in 2003. During this short period, while fighting for the independence of the event from external influences, he started together with the president of the Biennale, Franco Bernabè, to modernise its organizational infrastructure while giving it a renewed international prestige.

Finally, early in 2005 he was named Program Director of the short-lived New Montreal FilmFest of 2005, an event wanted by both Federal and Quebec governments. The first and only edition of the event, meant as work in progress, took place from 18 to 25 September 2005. In spite of the limited time available, Moritz de Hadeln and his team were able to deliver a program with over 22 world premières. But local mismanagement by those in charge of its organisation led regretfully to discontinue the event.

Both for the festivals in Nyon, Locarno and later in Berlin, Moritz de Hadeln together with his wife Erika, were the authors of several landmark retrospectives, among many others The Uzbek cinema (1971), The New Indian Cinema(1972), Canadian 'cinema-direct' 1958–1972 (1976), The 'March of Time' newsreels (1978), Drew Associates 1960–1969 (1981), Selling Switzerland – Marketing Guillaume Tell (1984), Swiss Army Film Unit(1985), Panorama of the South East Asian Cinema (1980) and together with Hans-Joachim Schlegel: Documentary films of the Baltic Soviet Republics (1987/88), Documentary Films of the Armenian Soviet Republic (1989/90), Romania: the documentary films 1898–1990 (1990/91).

He served on many International Juries among others in the festivals of Karlovy Vary, Venice, Moscow, Montreal, Torino, Tehran, Damascus, Kyiv and Yerevan. He was a member of the European Film Academy (EFA). A Swiss citizen from 1986, Moritz de Hadeln later resided in Gland, Vaud from 2007 to 2011. As part of the Socialist group, he was a member of the Town Council. He was also a member of the local green party called "Les Verts de Gland". In 2018 his wife, Erika, died at the age of 77.

De Hadeln died in Nyon, Vaud, Switzerland on 4 July 2026, at the age of 85.

== Honours ==
- Moritz de Hadeln was Commander in the Ordre des Arts et des Lettres of the French Ministry of Culture (1986)
- Commander in the Order of Merit of the Italian Republic (1988)
- Officer in the Order of Merits of the Federal Republic of Germany (Bundesverdienstkreuz 1. Klasse) (2000).
- He has been awarded the De Curtis Award (1975) for organising the first retrospective of Italian actor "Totò",
- the honorary medal Pro Cultura Hungarica (1986)
- the Silver Medal of the Slovak Cinematography (1986).
- Elected honorary member of the Romanian Film maker's Union
- the European Prize of the European Film Forum in Strasbourg as "tribute to a great festival director" (2000),
- the Gold medal of the Ministry of Culture of the Russian Federation (2001),
- the Gay Teddy Bear (Teddy Award) (2001),
- the honorary FIPRESCI prize, jointly with Erika de Hadeln
- the honorary Oecumenical Jury prize (2001) jointly with Erika de Hadeln
- Tribute medal from the Hollywood Foreign Press Association in Venice, 2002
- Honorary Diploma of Appreciation at the 20 Fajr International Film Festival, Tehran (2002)
- Honorary Diploma of Appreciation at the Damascus International Film Festival, Syria (2003)
- the Armenian Filmmakers Union ANAHIT Award (2006) for the "great effort promoting Armenian Cinema and helping it find its place in the international cinema scene".

== Bibliography ==
- de Hadeln, Moritz 20e Festival International du Film Documentaire Nyon, Suisse "C'est du Cinéma", 196 pages (in French only), Ed. Nyon Film Festival,1988. ISBN 2-88346-006-X. cf- Dictionnaire historique de la Suisse
- Frigeri, Riccardo & de Hadeln, Moritz "Cinema e Rivoluzione", Cenobio Rivista bimestrale di Cultura December 1972 Anno XXI, with the transcript of the interventions, among others, of Eric Barnouw, Yvette Biro, Eduardo Bruno, Egon Günter, André Halimi, Nabil Maleh, Roger Manvell, Walter Marti, Henri Storck, Andrei Tarkovsky and Cesare Zavattini, 63 pages (in Italian), Ed. Cenobio, 1972
- de Hadeln, Moritz & Erika with Schlegel, Hans-Joachim "Documentary Films of the Baltic Soviet Republics", 112 pages (in French, German and English), joint publication of the Nyon and Berlin International Film Festivals, Ed. Nyon Film Festival, 1988.
- de Hadeln, Moritz & Erika with Schlegel, Hans-Joachim Documentary "Films of the Armenian Soviet Republic", 128 pages (in French, German and English), joint publication of the Nyon and Berlin International Film Festivals, Ed. Nyon Film Festival, 1989. ISBN 2-88346-007-8
- de Hadeln, Moritz, de Hadeln, Erika & Schlegel, Hans-Joachim "Romania: the Documentary Films (1898–1990)”, 124 pages (in French, German and English), joint publication of the Nyon and Berlin International Film Festivals, Ed. Nyon Film Festival, 1990. – ISBN 2-88346-009-4
- de Hadeln, Moritz “L'Insupportable Vérité, Chronique de six années turbulantes (1988–1993)”, 132 pages (in French only), Ed. Nyon International Film Festival, 1993 – ISBN 2-88346-014-0
- Jacobsen, Wolfgang 50 years Berlinale, 563 pages (in English, edited also separately in German), Ed. Nicolai, 2000 – ISBN 3-87584-906-X
- Baer, Volker and de Hadeln, Moritz “Closing the Book”, Moritz de Hadeln's Berlinale, 89 pages (bilingual German and English), Ed. Berlin Festspiele GmbH, 2001 – Catalogue of the Deutsche National Bibliothek
- Roddolo, Enrica La Biennale: Arte, polemiche, scandali e storie in Laguna, 262 pages (in Italian), Ed. Marsilio, 2003 – ISBN 978-88-317-8240-1
- Quarti, Angelo and Caregnato, Antonio Christmas stars 03, 173 pages (in Italian, but mostly photos as tribute to the press photographers of the 2003 Mostra), Ed. ScribaNetStudio.com, 2003
