= Doc Alliance =

European documentary film festival organization

The Doc Alliance is a network of major European documentary film festivals, comprising CPH:DOX, Doclisboa, DOK Leipzig, the FIDMarseille, the Ji.hlava International Documentary Film Festival, Millennium Docs Against Gravity, and Visions du Réel. Founded in 2008, it was established as a transnational collaboration intended to strengthen the circulation, exhibition and international visibility of European documentary cinema.

The network coordinates festival programming, professional cooperation and the annual Doc Alliance Award, through which its member festivals select and promote notable documentary works. The winners are announced at Cannes Docs, part of the Marché du Film, the film-industry market held alongside the Cannes Film Festival.

It also established DAFilms, an online distribution platform for documentary and experimental cinema, which was launched in 2009. It has received financial support from the European Union’s Creative Europe programme.

== Distribution platform ==
The main project of the Doc Alliance is DAFilms.com, an online distribution platform for documentary and experimental films focused on European cinema, which hosts around 1700 films for streaming or download. The films include archive historical films and works by international filmmakers such as Ulrich Seidl, Jorgen Leth, and Chris Marker.

== Doc Alliance Award ==
The Doc Alliance Award is an annual award for documentary filmmaking presented by the Doc Alliance network. Each member festival, together with a selected guest festival, nominates one feature-length documentary and one short film from its previous programme.

The winners are selected by an international jury of film-industry professionals. The awards carry prizes of €5,000 for Best Feature Film and €3,000 for Best Short Film, intended to support the filmmakers' subsequent work. The short-film category was introduced in 2021.

The location of the award ceremony has varied. In 2015, the feature-film award was presented during the industry programme of the Locarno Film Festival, while the 2026 awards were presented at the Doc Day Lunch during the Marché du Film in Cannes.

=== 2015 ===
- Winner: Homeland (Iraq Year Zero) – director: Abbas Fahdel
  - Walking Under Water – director: Eliza Kubarska
  - Stranded in Canton – director: Måns Månsson
  - Illusion – director: Sofia Marques
  - I Am the People – director: Anna Roussillon
  - Haunted – director: Liwaa Yazji
  - All Things Ablaze – directors: Oleksandr Techynskyi, Aleksey Solodunov, Dmitry Stoykov

=== 2016 ===
- Winner: Gulîstan, Land of Roses – director: Zaynê Akyol
  - Jarocin – The Rise of Freedom – director: Lech Gnoinski, Marek Gajczak
  - Fragment 53 – director: Carlo Gabriele Tribbioli
  - Maybe Desert, Perhaps Universe – director: Miguel Seabra Lopes, Karen Akerman
  - Steam on the River – director: Filip Remunda, Robert Kirchhoff
  - Maestà, the Passion of Christ – director: Andy Guérif
  - Train to Adulthood – director: Klára Trencsényi

=== 2017 ===
- Winner: Taste of Cement – director: Ziad Kalthoum
  - 95 and 6 to Go' – director: Kimi Takesue
  - Convictions – director: Tatyana Chistova
  - Childhood – director: Margreth Olin
  - Spectres Are Haunting Europe – director: Maria Kourkouta, Niki Giannari
  - Those Shocking Shaking Days – director: Selma Doborac
  - When Will This Wind Stop – director: Aniela Astrid Gabryel

=== 2018 ===
- Winner: Srbenka – Director: Nebojša Slijepčević
  - Doel – Director: Frederik Sølberg
  - Granny Project – Director: Bálint Révész
  - The Limits of Work – Director: Apolena Rychlíková
  - Inside – Director: Camila Rodríguez Triana
  - Instant Dreams – Director: Willem Baptist
  - Southern Belle – Directed by: Nicolas Peduzzi

=== 2021 ===
  - A Black Jesus – Director: Lucca Lucchesi
  - The Blunder of Love – Director: Rocco Di Mento
  - Gabi, Between Ages of 8-13 – Director: Engeli Broberg
  - Looking for Horses – Director: Stefan Pavlović
  - Native Rock – Director: Macià Florit Campins
  - Traces of a Landsacpe – Director: Petr Záruba
  - Zaho Zay – Directed by: Maéva Ranaïvojaona, Georg Tiller

=== 2026 ===
The following feature-length films were nominated for the 2026 Doc Alliance Award:

  - A Song Without Home – Director: Rati Tsiteladze
  - Afterlives – Director: Kevin B. Lee
  - Fantasy – Director: Isabel Pagliai
  - Holler for Service – Directors: Ole Elfenkaemper and Kathrin Seward
  - Imago – Director: Déni Oumar Pitsaev
  - Minimum Love – Director: Maja Penčič
  - The Case Against Space – Director: Graeme Arnfield
  - Two Mountains Weighing Down My Chest – Director: Viv Li
