= I'm Never Afraid! =

2010 film

- Directed by: Willem Baptist
- Written by: Willem Baptist
- Produced by: Mete Gümurhhan
- Starring: Mack Bouwense
- Cinematography: Dirk-Jan Kerkkamp
- Edited by: Albert Markus
- Release date: November 2010
- Running time: 25 minutes
- Country: Netherlands
- Language: Dutch

I'm Never Afraid! (Dutch: Ik ben echt niet bang!) is a 2010 Dutch Super 16mm documentary film about Mack Bouwense an eight-year-old professional motocross racer who has a mirrored heart, a condition known as dextrocardia. It is directed by award-winning Dutch filmmaker Willem Baptist and broadcast by VPRO on 20 November 2010. In German and French speaking countries the documentary was broadcast by ARTE.

It premiered at the International Documentary Film Festival Amsterdam, and screened at more than 100 film festivals worldwide including BFI London Film Festival, Slamdance, Sprockets; Toronto Film Festival, and Kraków Film Festival. It won multiple international awards including a Golden Gate Award at San Francisco International Film Festival, Documentary Short Grand Jury Prize at Atlanta Film Festival, and a Kinderkast Jury award non-fiction at Cinekid Festival. In 2011, the documentary was nominated for a broadcast award for Best Children Programme at the Netherlands Institute for Sound and Vision.

In 2018, the International Documentary Film Festival Amsterdam (IDFA) compiled a list of the fifteen best classic children's documentaries of recent years. I'm Never Afraid! and the fourteen other documentaries in the Top 15 were made available free of charge by IDFA in April 2020 for children studying from home during the COVID-19 pandemic.
