= Wild Boar (film) =

- Directed by: Willem Baptist
- Written by: Willem Baptist
- Produced by: Joost Seelen
- Cinematography: Dirk-Jan Kerkkamp
- Release date: October 18, 2013
- Running time: 25 min.
- Country: Netherlands
- Language: Dutch

Wild Boar (Dutch: Wild Zwijn) is a 2013 Dutch documentary directed by Willem Baptist. The film is a poetic and strongly stylized tale about the ambivalent relationship between humans and wild boars. The film was realised with support of the Dutch Cultural Media Fund and is part of project Doc25; a joint initiative by Dutch broadcasters AVRO, BOS, EO, IKON, NTR, VPRO.

Wild Boar had its Dutch premiere at the Nederlands Film Festival in Utrecht and was shortlist nominated for a Gouden Kalf for Best Short Documentary at The Netherlands Film Festival. The film had its international premières in competition respectively at the renowned festivals Visions du Réel (Nyon, Switzerland), Karlovy Vary International Film Festival, AFI Docs (Silver Spring, USA) and Hot Docs International Documentary Film Festival in Toronto. Baptist approach to the subject and peculiar way of telling the story found international recognition. AFI Docs described the film as "an otherworldly and poetic look at the classic conflict of Man vs. Nature." and Hot Docs wrote: "A village in the Netherlands is invaded by wild boar and its inhabitants must choose: eat or be eaten. A meticulously crafted folklore atmosphere beautifully captures the challenges we face when modern society conflicts with nature." In Switzerland, where the film won a Special Mention Award, Visions du Réel published: "An epic and eccentric film. The technique borrows from codes of fiction, and scenes follow one another in surrealistic style with a touch of joyful black humour". Canadian FERNTV published their Top 10 Films @ Hot Docs and wrote: "Downright dark and chilling at times like that of The Blair Witch Project." Film review website Film Threat described the film as: "Darkly humorous... a marvelous small gem". The Washington City Paper however criticised the film for "a possible allegorical connection to the Holocaust" and called the film "cold and unssetteling".
