= Instant Dreams =

- Directed by: Willem Baptist
- Written by: Willem Baptist
- Produced by: Pieter van Huystee
- Cinematography: Gregor Meerman
- Edited by: Albert Markus Jr.
- Music by: Marc Lizier
- Release date: November 18, 2017 (Amsterdam International Documentary Film Festival)
- Running time: 91 minutes
- Country: Netherlands
- Language: English

Instant Dreams is a 2017 documentary directed by Dutch director Willem Baptist. It premiered at the International Documentary Film Festival Amsterdam (IDFA) 18 November 2017 where it screened at Tuschinski Amsterdam in the Dutch Documentary Competition and First Appearance Competition. On 14 December 2017 the film was theatrically released in the Netherlands and Belgium. Slamdance Film Festival hosted the American festival premiere on 21 January 2018 in Park City, Utah. April 2019 the film was theatrical released in the US and Canada, starting with select screenings in New York and Los Angeles.

== Film content ==
Instant Dreams tells the story of those who eagerly await the rebirth of the classic and recognizable Polaroid photo, and of scientists who are trying to unravel the secrets of the chemical formula. The film features Stefanie Schneider – a free-spirited German artist who lives in a Polaroid picture-world out in the Californian desert, Christopher Bonanos - an editor at New York Magazine and author of the book Instant: The Story of Polaroid, Stephen Herchen - a chemist who worked alongside Polaroid's inventor and in his lab tries to unravel the formula which he describes as "the chemically most complex manmade thing ever made." Meanwhile in Tokyo, a young girl is just starting to discover it all while taking snap-shots on her iPhone. Their lives are strangely connected, each in their own way compelled not to let the medium die. A central theme in the film is the term Wabi-sabi about the beauty of imperfection.

Besides the main characters there is archival footage of Edwin H. Land, German Cult actor Udo Kier from Stefanie Schneider's Polaroid film "The girl behind the white picket fence" and there is a voice-cameo by documentary director Werner Herzog.

== Style ==
Instant Dreams is not a conventional documentary but rather a visual essay film and borrows some of its style from 1970s science-fiction films. International Documentary Festival Amsterdam (IDFA) described the film as a "Rollercoaster of color and light". Slamdance compared the cinematography to a mixture between Blade Runner and 2001: A Space Odyssey. During a Dutch television appearance Baptist confirmed these films influenced him and that he took cues from Close Encounters of the Third Kind for constructing the story.

== Background ==
In 2016, Impossible Magazine reported that Baptist was shooting a documentary, titled Instant Dreams, in Berlin and California. In an interview with Dutch newspaper Trouw, Baptist said his lively dreams were a source of inspiration in making the documentary.

The documentary was shot in multiple locations: Twentynine Palms, New York City, Berlin, Tokyo, Düsseldorf and at the factory of Polaroid Originals in Enschede on different Arri Alexa camera's at 2K and 4K resolution. The aspect-ratio is 2.39:1 cinemascope.

Christopher Bonanos wrote about his experiences in participating in the film in an article on Vulture.com titled "How My Son and I Ended Up in a Film About Film." In the article he describes the demanding shooting schedule.

In 2018 Variety reported that Synergetic Distribution, ahead of Instant Dream's New York festival premiere at Doc NYC, acquired the U.S. rights and were planning a 2019 theatrical release. In April 2019 the film was theatrical released in the US and Canada, starting with select screenings in New York and Los Angeles.

For the American release the tag line was changed from "An Extraordinary Polaroid Trip" to "The Lost Chemistry of Dr. Land".

The Saugatuck Center for the Arts, presented the Midwest premiere on Friday, October 19, 2018, and featured an on-site Polaroid portrait studio in the lobby.

A soundtrack album was digitally released in 2017 to coincide with the release of the film. Written by composer Marc Lizier, the soundtrack features a blend of retro electronic and orchestral musical pieces.

In the Netherlands NTR broadcast the film via the Dutch public broadcasting system. In the UK it was broadcast via Sky Arts.

== Critical reception ==
In its origin country the Netherlands the film was met with critical praise. Newspapers Volkskrant, Trouw and Parool each rated it 4 out of 5 stars. Volkskrant wrote: "Baptist made a film like a hallucinatory trip; a fantastic tribute to an enchanting medium." Dutch based Film Score Magazine called it "One of the most astonishing documentary films to have been made in Holland."

Upon its US theatrical release, the film divided critics. The New York Times, The Hollywood Reporter and the Los Angeles Times wished the filmmakers had pursued a more journalistic approach. Other media outlets such as Geek.com, Ozus' World Movie Reviews, Film Inquiry and Eye on Film were far more accepting of the film, praising the storytelling, cinematography and artistry of filmmaking. Film Threat rated it 9 out of 10 stars. Eye on Film rated it 4.5 out of 5 stars and called "a dazzling piece of work".

Instant Dreams holds a positive overall score on Rotten Tomatoes, rating it ‘fresh’ based on multiple critic reviews.

The film was nominated for a Golden Calf (award) at the Netherlands Film Festival, a Doc Alliance Award and the prestigious Rose d'Or Award.
