= Wild pig =

A wild pig may be:

- Suina, a suborder of even-toed mammals, including:
  - Suidae, a family of animals that are pigs or pig-like, including the Suinae and more distantly related extinct Old World tribes
    - Suinae, a subfamily which includes the Sus genus, all other existing pig genera, and closely related extinct genera
      - Sus (genus), a genus including domestic pig, wild boar, and many Southeast Asian wild pig species
        - Eurasian wild boar, Sus scrofa
        - Wild pigs of the Philippines, any of four species of the genus Sus in the Philippines
        - Feral pigs, domesticated pigs, Sus scrofa domestica, that have reverted to life as wild animals
  - Tayassuidae, another family of animals that are pigs or pig-like: the New World pigs or peccaries/javelinas
