= Polaroid B.V. =

Dutch photography company

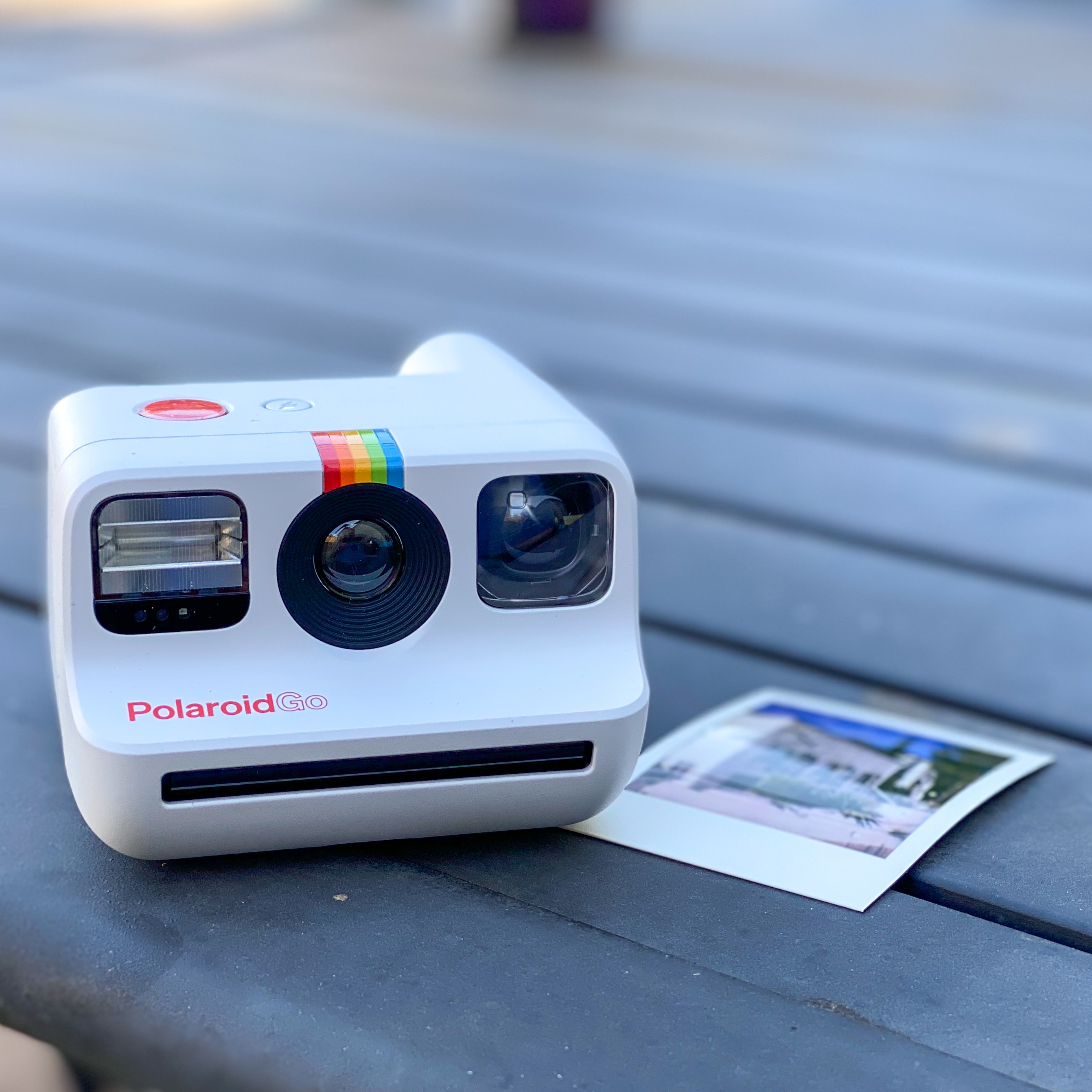
- The Polaroid Go, an instant camera developed by Polaroid B.V.
- Trade name: Polaroid
- Formerly: The Impossible Project
- Type: Private
- Industry: Photography
- Genre: Instant photography
- Predecessor: Polaroid (by brand acquisition)
- Founded: 2008; 18 years ago
- Founders: Florian Kaps; André Bosman; Marwan Saba
- Headquarters: Building Noord, Enschede, Netherlands
- Area served: Worldwide
- Key people: Oskar Smołokowski (CEO)
- Products: Instant film and cameras
- Website: polaroid.com

Polaroid B.V. (trading as the second incarnation of Polaroid and formerly as Polaroid Originals) is a Dutch photography and consumer electronics company, founded as a manufacturer of discontinued film for Polaroid Corporation instant cameras. In addition to film, the company produces new instant cameras under the Polaroid brand name as well as wireless speakers and other accessories.

Polaroid B.V. was founded in 2008 as The Impossible Project (sometimes known as Impossible). In 2017, Polaroid Corporation's brand and intellectual property were acquired by Impossible Project's largest shareholder and the company was rebranded as Polaroid Originals. In March 2020, Polaroid Originals branding shortened its name to Polaroid.

== History ==
The Impossible Project logo

The Impossible Project was founded in 2008 after the original Polaroid announced in February of that year that it would stop producing film for Polaroid cameras. The founders were Florian Kaps, André Bosman, and Marwan Saba. In June 2008, Kaps and Bosman met at the Polaroid factory's closing event and decided to find a company to produce materials for Polaroid cameras. In October 2008, Impossible bought Polaroid's remaining production machinery for $3.1 million and leased the north building of the Polaroid plant that had been operating in Enschede, Netherlands. Using that equipment and plant, they developed new instant film products for use in some of the existing Polaroid cameras, and began mass production and sales in 2010. They generated US$270,000 in profit on US$4 million in revenue and sold 500,000+ units.

In January 2012, the company announced that it and Polaroid would launch a range of collectible products, called The Polaroid Classic range, that originates from different periods of Polaroid's history. Between six and ten products will be released each year. In July 2013, Florian Kaps announced his retirement from the project and Creed O'Hanlon took over as CEO.

In December 2014, The Impossible Project announced that Oskar Smołokowski would be their new CEO and Creed O'Hanlon would become the executive chairman of Impossible's management board.

Polaroid (Impossible BV) has offices in Vienna, Berlin, New York City, and Tokyo, and has licensed its name to stores in Germany, Spain, and London.

Polaroid Originals logo used from 2017 to 2020

Polaroid's logo from 2020 to 2023

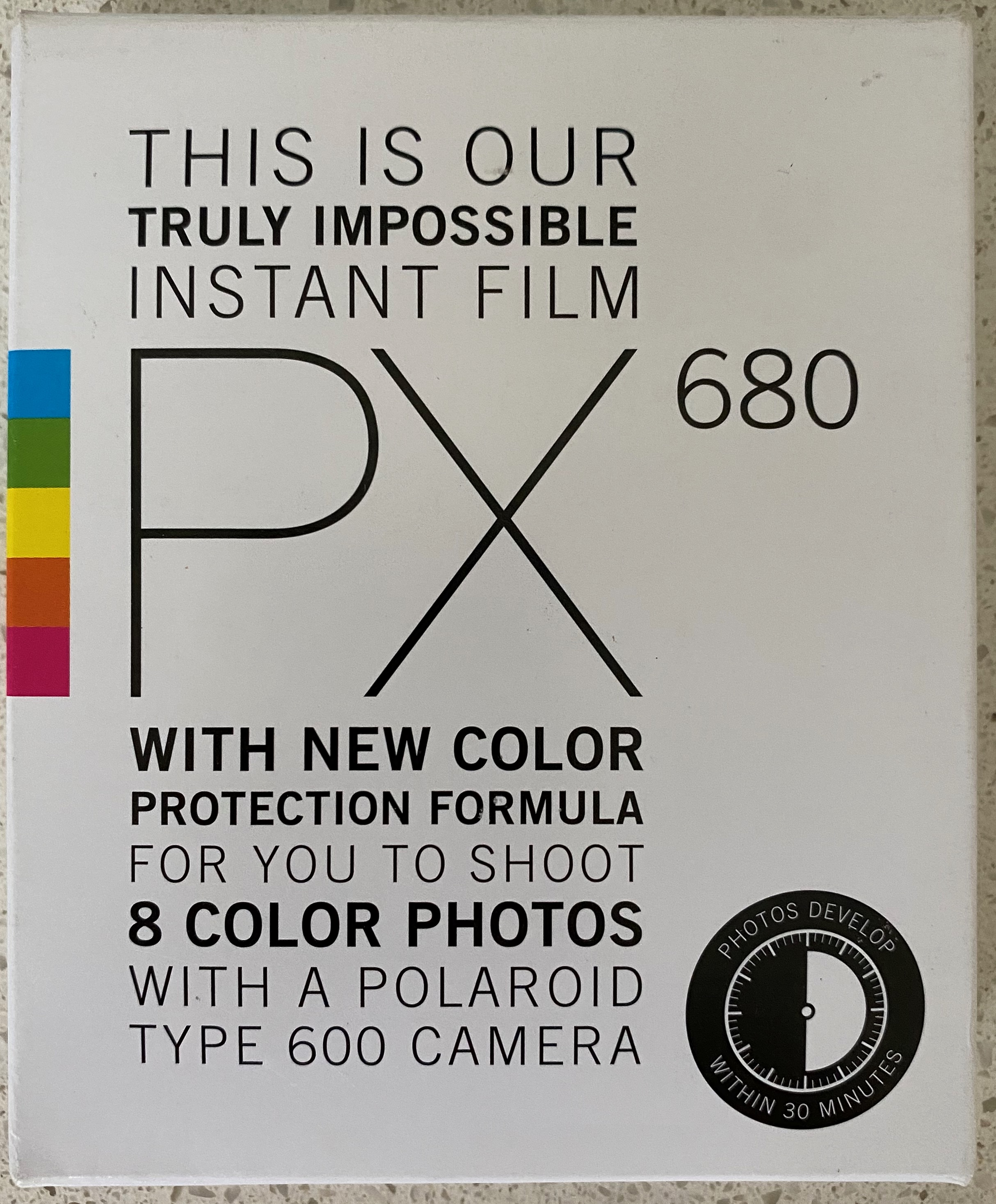
Impossible branded PX 680 Color Protection film from 2012

In May 2017, Wiaczesław Smołokowski (father of Impossible's CEO as well as being its largest shareholder) acquired the brand and intellectual property of the original Polaroid corporation. Impossible Project was renamed Polaroid Originals in September 2017. In March 2020, the company rebranded again, changing its name to simply Polaroid.

== Products ==
=== Instant film ===
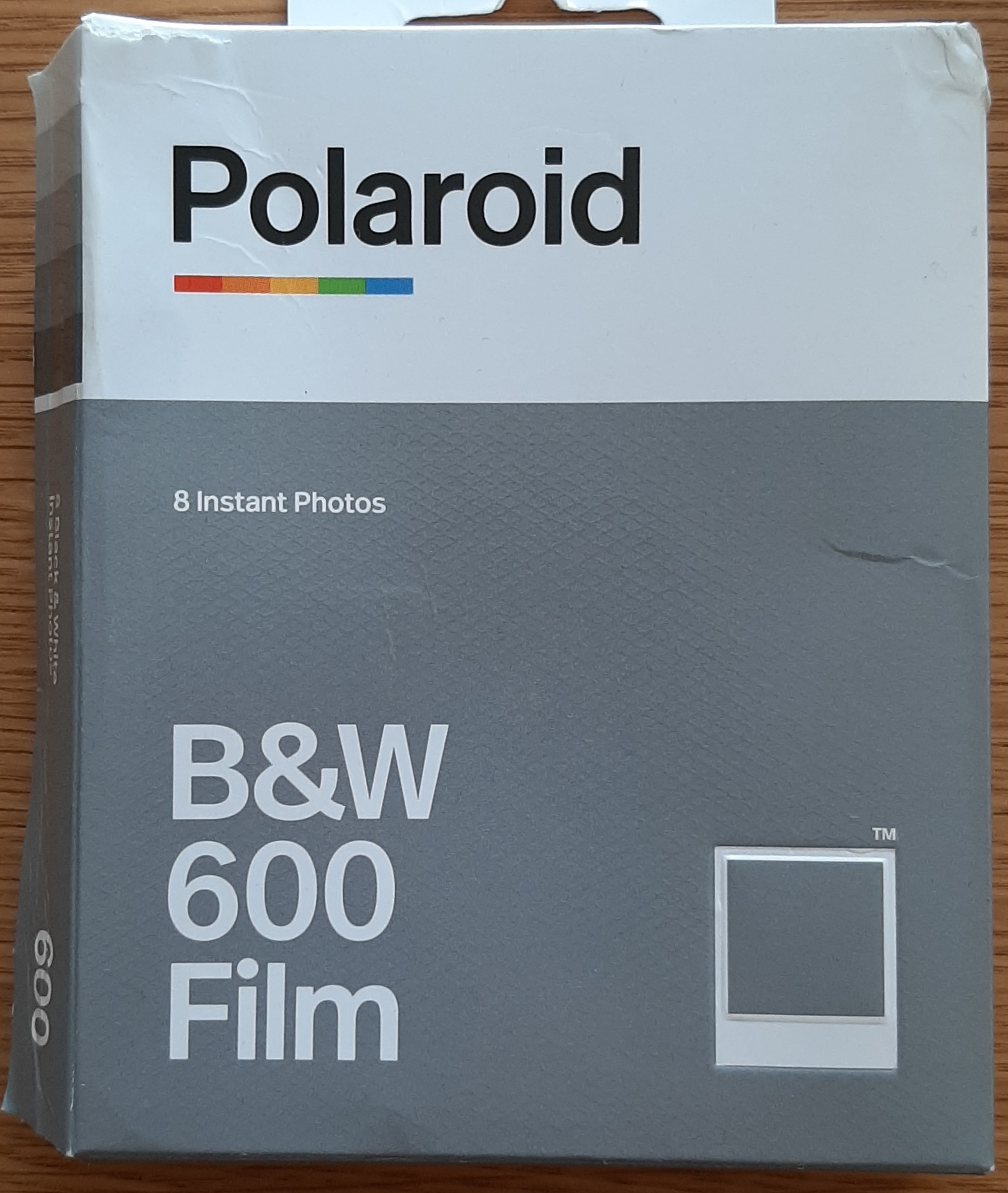
Polaroid branded film from 2021

Polaroid manufactures SX-70 and 600 film, i-Type film, Go film, and large format 8x10 film. Unlike the original large format 8x10 film, the new 8x10 is an integral film with the positive and the negative kept together. The wide-format Spectra film, produced between 2010 and 2019, was discontinued in October 2019 as a result of technical issues and motor jams from ejecting new film.

The SX-70, 600, and i-Type film all have the same length and width measurements, 4.2 x 3.5 in (107 mm x 88 mm) with a 3.1 x 3.1 in (79 mm x 79 mm) square image area. The smaller-format Go film measures 2.623 x 2.122 in (66.6 mm x 53.9 mm) with a 1.851 x 1.811 in (47 mm x 46 mm) image area. The integral zinc-chloride battery that was in the original film of the SX-70 and 600 is replaced with a lithium-ion system in Impossible's remakes. The i-Type and Go, for which integrated rechargeable batteries are part of the camera itself, do not have a battery in their film. Current SX-70 film has a speed of ISO 160; all other lines are ISO 640. Except for the 8x10 film (which comes in 10 sheets per box), all films are sold in units of 8 exposures.

In addition to the usual white-framed film, Polaroid BV has made 600 and i-Type films with special frame colors, patterns, and/or shapes. These can be limited in quantity and become discontinued earlier. For the classical SX-70 and 600 series, many earlier "test versions" are listed as well.

Discontinued	Current

Polaroid SX-70
Film name	Type	ISO	Release	Discontinued	Characteristics
PX 100 Silver Shade First Flush	B&W	150	February 2010	???	First flush, B&W, instant film for Polaroid SX 70 cameras. Released first to artists, then to regular customers
PX 100 Silver Shade	B&W	150	March 2010	???	Second generation film
PX 100 Silver Shade Cool	B&W	150	September 2012	???	
PX 70 Color Shade First Flush	Color	125	July 2010	???	First flush, experimental color system
PX 70 Color Shade Push!	Color	100	December 2010	???	An ongoing chemical reaction makes images taken on the PX 70 PUSH! shift to blue with time.
PX 70 Color Shade	Color	125	June 2011	???	
PX 70 Color Shade Cool	Color	125	April 2012	???	
PX 70 Color Shade V4B Test Film	Color	125	August 2012	August 2012	Introduction of an Opacifier
PX 70 Color Protection	Color	125	???	???	
Cyanotype for SX70	Color	100	???	???	Cyan Color
B&W SX-70 Film	B&W	160	April 2015	Available	White frame
Color SX-70 Film	Color	160	October 2013	Available	White frame

Polaroid 600
Film name	Type	ISO	Release	Discontinued	Characteristics
PX 600 Silver Shade First Flush	B&W	600	February 2010	???	First flush, first supplied to artists, then to regular customers
PX 600 Silver Shade v05	B&W	600	May 2010	???	
PX 600 Silver Shade v06	B&W	600	June 2010	???	
PX 600 Silver Shade UV+	B&W	600	June 2010	???	UV+ sheet improves the black & white tone; also versions in black, grey, and gold frame.
PX 600 Silver Shade Cool	B&W	600	June 2010	???	
PX 680 Color Shade Beta	Color	680	???	???	
PX 680 Color Shade Beta 2	Color	680	???	???	
PX 680 Color Shade First Flush	Color	680	???	???	
PX 680 Color Shade Cool	Color	680	June 2012	???	
PX 680 Color Shade Block Party	Color	680	???	???	Urban Outfitters Exclusive
PX 680 Color Shade V4B Test Film	Color	600	July 2012	July 2012	
PX 680 Color Protection	Color	600	???	???	
Ltd Edition Generation 2.0 Color 600 Film	Color	600	???	???	
Cyanotype Film for 600	Color	600	January 2015	???	White frame, Blue shadows and White highlights.
B&W 600 Film	B&W	640	March 2015	Available	White frame
Third Man Records Edition Black & Yellow Film for 600	B&Y	600	???	???	Black frame, Black and Yellow film
Black & Red Duochrome for 600	B&R	640	???	???	Black frame, Black and Red film
Black & Orange Duochrome for 600	B&O	640	???	???	Black frame, Black and Orange Film
Black & Pink Duochrome for 600	B&P	640	???	???	Black frame, Black and Pink film
Color 600 Film	Color	640	???	Available	White, white round, and color frames
Black & Yellow 600 Duochrome Edition Film	B&Y	640	August 2020	???	Black Frame, Black and Yellow Film
Black & Green 600 Duochrome Edition Film	B&G	640	June 2022	???	Black Frame, Black and Yellow Film
Blue 600 Reclaimed Edition Film	Blue	640	April 2023	July 2023	Experimental chemistry incorporating reclaimed factory waste material

i-Type
Film name	Type	ISO	Release	Discontinued	Characteristics
B&W Film	B&W	600	October 2013	January 2015	"Impossible Hardware", Type-600 film without battery
Color Film	Color	600	October 2013	January 2015	"Impossible Hardware", Type-600 film without battery
Color i-Type Film	Color	640	September 2017	Available	Type-600 film without battery
B&W i-Type Film	B&W	640	September 2017	Available	Type-600 film without battery

Go
Film name	Type	ISO	Release	Discontinued	Characteristics
Color Go Film	Color	640	August 2021	Available	Compatible only with the Go camera

Polaroid Image/Spectra
Film name	Type	ISO	Release	Discontinued	Characteristics
PZ 600 Silver Shade	Sepia	600	???	???	
PZ 600 Silver Shade UV+	Sepia	600	December 2010	???	UV+ sheet improves the black & white tone
PZ 600 UV+ Black Frame	Sepia	600	???	???	
PZ 600 silver Shade Cool	Sepia	600	???	???	
PZ 680 Color Shade	Color	680	???	???	
PZ 680 Color Protection	Color	600	December 2012	???	
Color Film Black Frame	Color	600	???	???	Black Frame
B&W 2.0 Film Black Frame	B&W	600	2015	???	Black Frame
Color Film	Color	640	September 2017	October 2019	
B&W Film for Spectra	B&W	640	September 2017	October 2019	

8x10 Film
Film name	Type	ISO	Release	Discontinued	Characteristics
PQ Silver Shade	B&W	640	August 2012	Late 2013	
PQ Silver Shade	B&W	640	Late 2013	Late 2013	Second generation
B&W 8x10 Film	B&W	640	July 2014	???	Third Generation
B&W 8x10 Film	B&W	640	???	Out of stock	
Color 8x10 Film	Color	640	???	Out of stock	

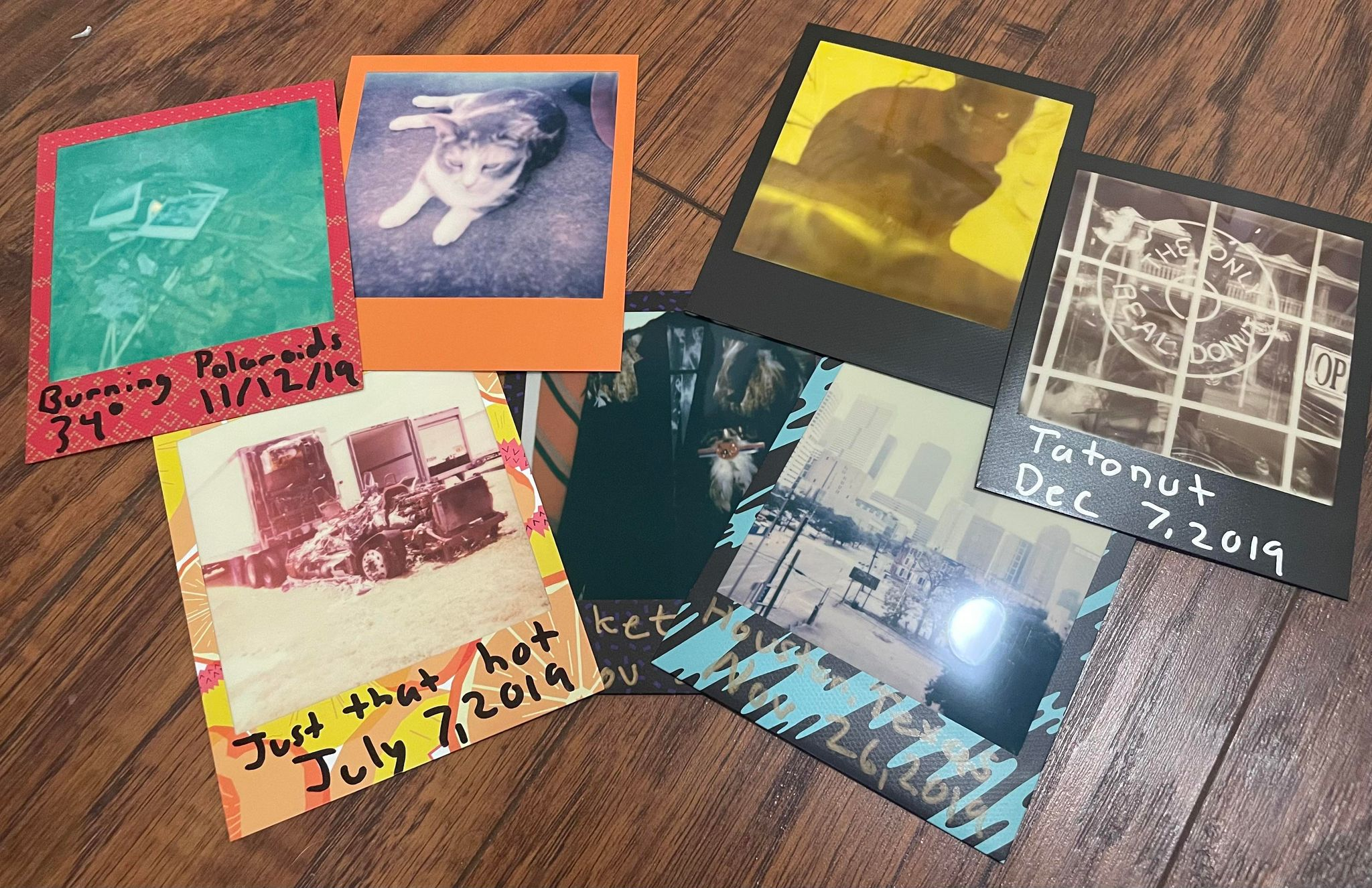
Photos showing the different frames offered by Polaroid

==== Future and other formats ====
The Impossible Project has stated that they will not manufacture packfilm "in the foreseeable future", due to the investment required, and cannot produce 4x5, Type 100, or Type 80 films, Polaroid 500 film and I-Zone film as they do not have the production machinery. These were disassembled along with the factories that used to produce the film when Polaroid filed for bankruptcy.

Impossible founder Florian Kaps left the company in July 2013 and later founded a coffee house and photo studio in Vienna called SUPERSENSE. Kaps revealed through a series of blog posts and interviews in 2016 that he had personally approached Fuji about acquiring their machinery in an attempt to rescue their soon-to-be discontinued FP3000b and FP100b packfilm products. Kaps was unsuccessful in this pursuit, but motivated by his disappointment in Fuji's decision, he established the Analogue Product Institute (API) with the goal of "developing a NEW generation of analog instant packfilm [and] Establishing a rich network of new suppliers, manufacturers and financiers from all over the world".

=== Hardware ===
Polaroid produces its own hardware and used to refurbish Polaroid Corporation cameras.

==== Instant Lab ====
The Instant Lab is a device that exposes digital images from a smartphone onto analog instant film, using the light produced by the screen.

The first generation of the Instant Lab was introduced in October 2013. It supports the iPhone 4, 4s, 5, 5c and 5s, as well as the iPod Touch. The device was produced after a successful crowd-funding campaign on Kickstarter.

Impossible Project introduced a new battery-less film cartridge design for use with the Instant Lab. The system, now known as the i-Type system, is a Polaroid 600-type cartridge stripped of the battery. The Instant Lab is internally-powered and does not rely on the battery to work. It works with all Polaroid square film formats, that is the original 600, the battery-less i-Type, and the less sensitive SX-70.

A "universal cradle" was later released for Instant Lab 1.0 to accommodate different screen sizes on the iPhone 6 and various Android phones. It turns the device into the newer Instant Lab Universal (2015), a new generation announced at Photokina 2014.

==== Hi•Print ====
Released in August 2020 the Hi•Print is a Bluetooth portable printer that uses dye-sublimation to create 2.1 inch x 3.4 inch prints with an adhesive backing to be used like a sticker. The printer uses 10 pack cartridges containing both paper and dyes. Much like the Instant Lab, the device is controlled via an app. Unlike Polaroid's other hardware, the Hi•Print is an entirely digital system.

=== Instant cameras ===
==== Impossible I-1 ====
In 2016, Impossible started manufacturing its own instant camera, the Impossible I-1. It is a part of the company's original i-Type system, which uses its new i-Type film and 600 film. It features Bluetooth connectivity for remote control, double-exposure, advanced manual settings, among other features. It was designed by Teenage Engineering.

==== Polaroid OneStep 2 ====
In September 2017, Polaroid Originals announced the Polaroid OneStep 2 instant film camera that uses its i-Type film and 600 film. In the first version of this camera, framing is done by looking through a window on the back of the camera. Later in 2018, the company released a version with a built-in viewfinder that makes framing more accurate, the OneStep 2 Viewfinder.

==== Polaroid OneStep+ ====
In September 2018, Polaroid Originals introduced the Polaroid OneStep+ instant film camera that uses i-Type film and 600 film. The OneStep+ has built-in Bluetooth wireless technology that allows the camera to be paired with the Polaroid Originals app on an iOS or Android smartphone or tablet. This enables six new features: remote trigger, double exposure, light painting, self-timer (with up to a 12 s countdown), manual mode (controlling aperture, shutter speed, flash intensity, and photos ejection) and noise trigger. The OneStep+ has an additional portrait lens, with a minimum focusing distance of 30 cm. A slide toggle on the top of the camera switches between the two lenses.

The camera also includes a higher-capacity battery (recharged through a microUSB adapter), a built-in flash, and a viewfinder.

==== Polaroid Now ====
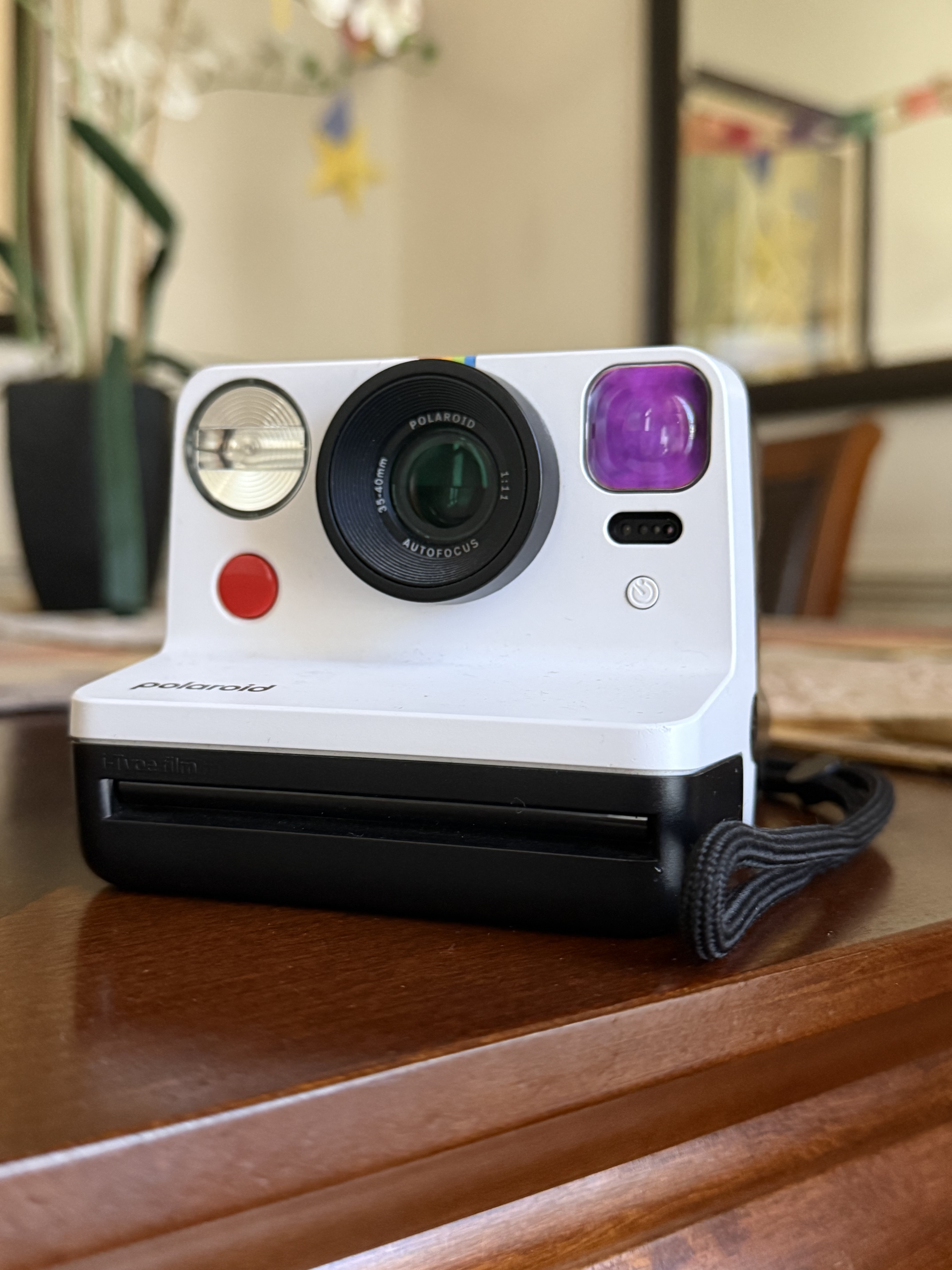
The Polaroid Now Instant Camera (Generation 2).

In March 2020, along with Polaroid Originals' rebranding to Polaroid, the Polaroid Now was released. Much like the OneStep+, the Now uses 600 or i-Type film and features 2 stage autofocus without the need to manually change focus points, a self-timer and built-in flash. Unlike previous cameras, exposure compensation is adjusted by holding the flash button and shown using the frame counter window. The Now comes in multiple colours with a more rounded design.

==== Polaroid Go ====
In April 2021, Polaroid announced the Polaroid Go camera along with the Polaroid Go film. Both the Go camera and Go film are considered 'mini' versions of the 'Now' series. The camera measures 5.9 x 3.3 x 2.4 inches, with shutter speeds of 1/30 to 1/125 and a f/12 & f/52 34mm lens (35mm equivalent). The film measures 2.6 x 2.1 inches and is rated at 640 ISO.

==== Polaroid Now+ ====
In August 2021, Polaroid unveiled the Polaroid Now+ camera, which is a revamped version of the 2020 Polaroid Now model. This version of the camera is compatible with both 600 and i-Type film and comes with 5 lens filter accessories. The camera can also access two additional tools available through the Polaroid mobile app — aperture priority and tripod mode.

==== Polaroid I-2 ====
In August 2023, Polaroid unveiled the Polaroid I-2 camera, which is the successor to the original Impossible I-1. This camera is compatible with three types of Polaroid film: i-Type, 600, and SX-70. The camera is the first to feature a 3 lens system with a LiDAR autofocus system.

=== "Polaroid 3D" Series ===
==== Polaroid Play ====
In February 2017, Polaroid released a 3D pen to compete with the 3Doodler brand. The Polaroid Play pen allows users to make creations in a 3-dimensional form. It uses filament made from PLA plastic.

==== Polaroid CandyPlay ====
In June 2021, Polaroid also released a 3D pen, similar to the Play, but instead of the PLA filament that the Play pen uses, the CandyPlay features a loading point where the user places a hard candy cartridge in it, to shape edible 3D creations.

== Media ==
The complexity of developing new generations of (prototype) instant film was depicted in the 2017 documentary Instant Dreams. Parts of the documentary were shot on location at Polaroid Originals 30 minute photo labs and production facilities in the Netherlands and Germany and includes Chief Technical Officer Stephen Herchen.

An Impossible Project (2020) is a documentary that follows Florian "Doc" Kaps and The Impossible Project from 2014, through the rebranding to Polaroid Originals, Supersense and Kaps' other projects. The film includes interviews with Christopher Bonanos, Kaps, Oskar Smołokowski and others.
