= 3Doodler =

3D pen

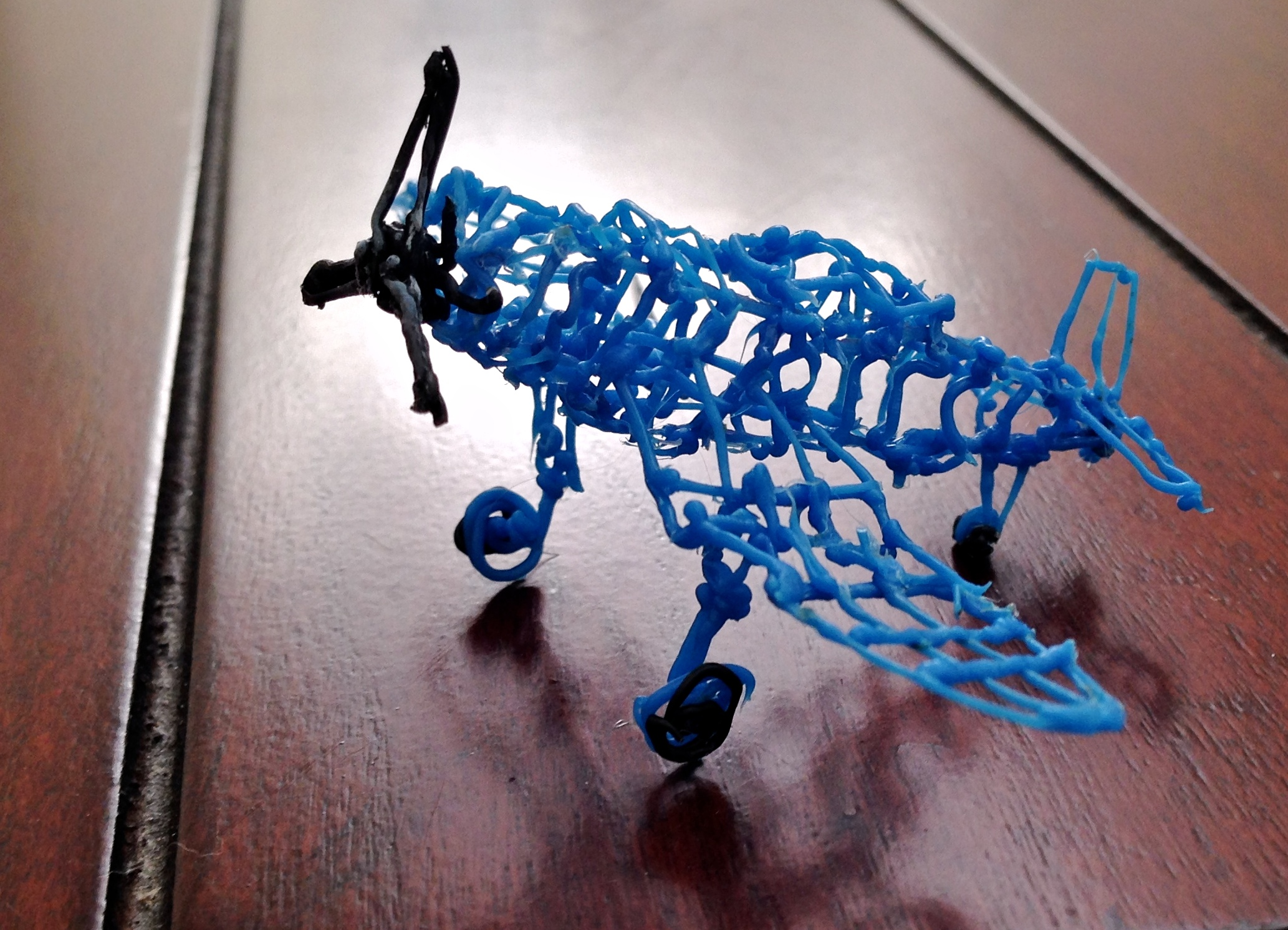
Corsair drawn with 3Doodler

The 3Doodler is a 3D printing pen developed by Peter Dilworth, Maxwell Bogue, and Daniel Cowen of WobbleWorks, Inc. (formerly WobbleWorks LLC). The 3Doodler works by extruding heated plastic that cools almost instantly into a solid, stable structure, allowing for the free-hand creation of three-dimensional objects. It utilizes plastic thread made of either acrylonitrile butadiene styrene (ABS), polylactic acid (PLA), or FLEXY, thermoplastic polyurethane (TPU) that is melted and then cooled through a patented process while moving through the pen, which can then be used to make 3D objects by hand. The 3Doodler has been described as a glue gun for 3D printing because of how the plastic is extruded from the tip, with one foot of the plastic thread equaling "about 11 feet of extruded material".

There are three pen models, Start, Create and Pro, intended for children, general consumers, and professionals respectively.

== Origins ==
The inventors of the 3Doodler, Maxwell Bogue and Peter Dilworth, built the first 3Doodler prototype in early 2012 at the Artisan's Asylum in Somerville, Massachusetts. After waiting fourteen hours for a 3D print session to complete, they discovered that the printer had missed a line, leading them to decide to create the manual pen.

== Kickstarter campaign ==
WobbleWorks launched a Kickstarter campaign for the 3Doodler on February 19, 2013, with an initial fundraising target of $30,000. The campaign closed on March 25, 2013. The $50 reward level was the minimum needed to receive the product, with highly recommended reward levels of $75 and $99 including more bags of plastic thread, and the highest level of $10,000 including a "membership in the company’s beta testing program for future products" and the opportunity to spend an entire day with the company's founders, along with the backer's 3Doodler being personally engraved. The reward levels were expanded due to demand, with the added tiers of the product shipping in 2014 rather than in 2013 for the earlier backers. The company also teamed up with several Etsy wire artists to showcase the abilities of the 3Doodler and to create "limited edition art pieces" for the campaign.

The fundraising target was reached within hours, and many of the reward levels were sold out within the first day, along with all the Etsy art pieces. By February 22, more than $1 million had been pledged, and the final pledge amount exceeded $2 million.

== 3Doodler Start ==
3Doodler Start is a version of the 3Doodler especially designed for little children. The developer states that it is kid-safe because the tip of the pen does not heat up. Instead of plugging it into a power outlet like other 3Doodlers, one can charge it and press the on button to use the pen.

== 3Doodler 2.0 ==
In January 2015, an improved version of the 3Doodler was introduced, and a second fundraising campaign on Kickstarter yielded more than $1.5 million. Updates include an option for changing the size and shape of the tip, a smaller design, and a quieter fan.

== 3Doodler EDU ==
3Doodler EDU sets are designed to be used in schools by educators and students. The target age group for 3Doodler EDU is from K-12 to University. The pens can be used to add an element of creativity and art into STEM/STEAM education. 3Doodler EDU has been certified for pedagogical quality by Education Alliance Finland.

== 3Doodler Chef ==
3Doodler Chef is a 3D pen specifically designed for creating edible candy sculptures and decorations. It uses food-safe isomalt sugar substitute capsules, allowing users to "draw" with candy in a fun and easy way. This tool makes candy sculpting accessible to everyone, from beginners to experienced bakers.

== 3Doodler PRO ==
The 3Doodler PRO is a 3D printing pen introduced in 2025 and designed for professional use by designers, engineers, and advanced makers. It supports multiple materials, including PLA, ABS, wood, copper, bronze, steel, nylon, and carbon‑fiber infused filaments. The PRO features an OLED display, adjustable temperature controls up to 240 °C, and interchangeable nozzles for different line widths and effects.

== Community ==
The original Kickstarter community has spawned a broader community of people who share their creations online.

== Notable creations ==
- Seashell Dress by SHIGO
- RC Plane by Matthew Butchard
- Fine Art Pieces by Rachel Goldsmith
- Ascot Hat by Grace Du Prez
- Plastic Man by Justin Mattarocchia
- Moodle by Nikki Firmin
- The MoMA Design Store Windows
- 3D Art Portfolio by Kseniia Snikhovska
- Articulated Anatomical Hand by Ricardo Martínez Herrera

== Other 3D pens ==
In February 2017, Polaroid B.V. released a 3D pen to compete with the 3Doodler brand. The Polaroid Play pen allows users to make creations in a 3-dimensional form. It uses filament made from PLA plastic.

Other makers include MYNT3D, TecBoss, CreoPop, Simo, Scribbler, AIO Robotics, PACKGOUT, BeTim, and Polaroid B.V.
