= Visions du Réel =

Film festival in Switzerland

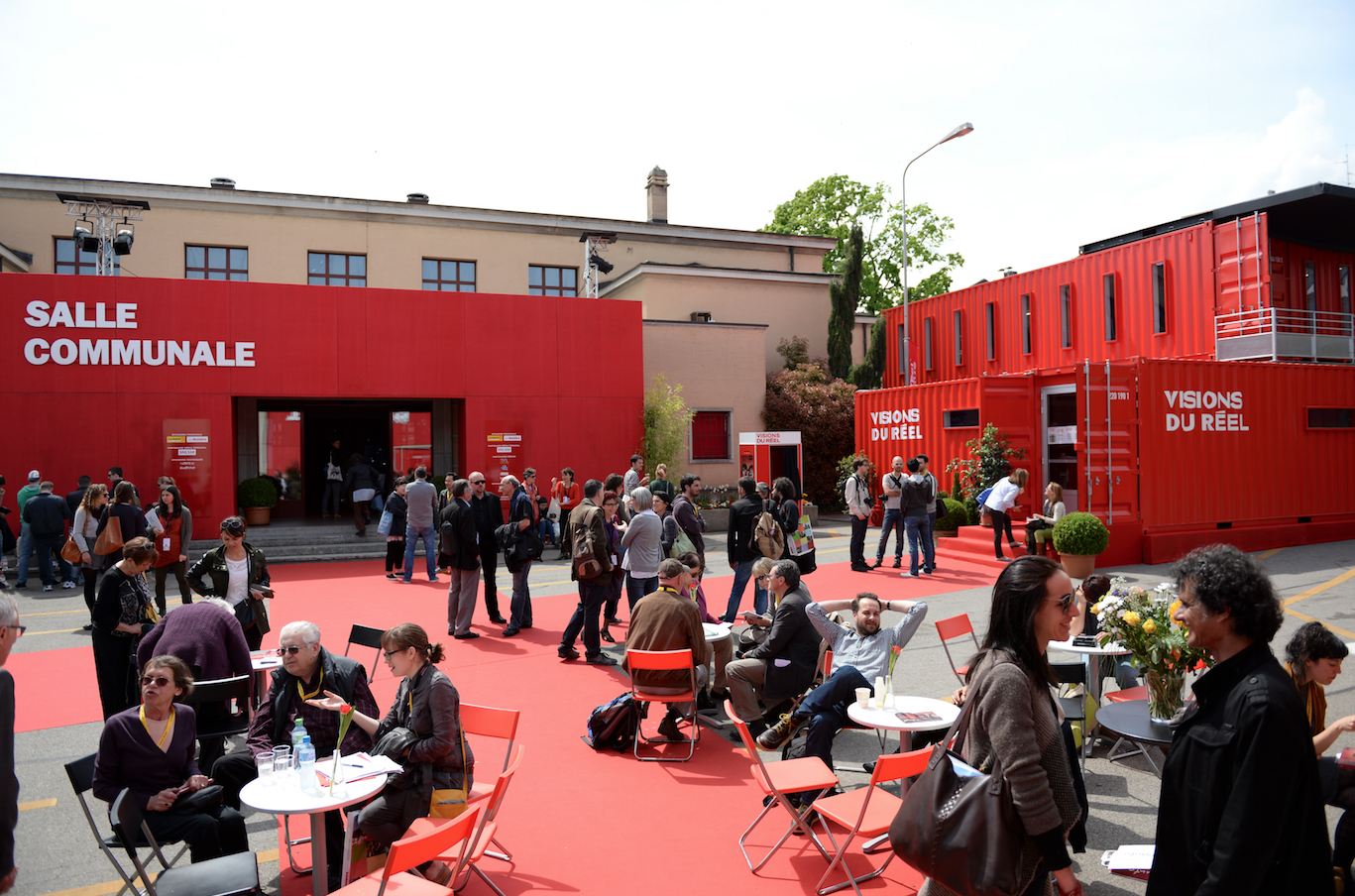
- Location: Nyon, Switzerland
- Founded: 1969, Moritz de Hadeln, Erika de Hadeln
- Awards: Sesterce d'or
- Directors: Emilie Bujès
- Festival date: Annually, in April
- Language: International
- Website: http://www.visionsdureel.ch/

Visions du Réel (Visions of Reality) is an internationally renowned documentary film festival held in April each year in Nyon, Switzerland. Established in 1969 as the Nyon International Documentary Film Festival, the event adopted its current name in 1995 and is the largest Swiss documentary festival.

== Profile ==
At its inception, the festival promoted Swiss films and films that were otherwise inaccessible — that is, those created in the Eastern Bloc countries behind the Iron Curtain. Now open to worldwide entries, the week-long festival has been directed by film critic Jean Perret since 1995.

The festival was founded by Moritz de Hadeln (who later headed the Locarno International Film Festival, the Berlin International Film Festival, the Venice International Film Festival and the short-lived New Montreal FilmFest of 2005) and his wife Erika de Hadeln who stated that:

Our motivations at that time were strictly political. We believed in documentary, we all had the same idea that documentary could change the society which we live in. It was not the time television was controlling everything...

Moritz de Hadeln directed the festival until 1979, and he assisted Erika when she took over as head of the festival from 1980 to 1993.

During the early years of the Nyon International Documentary Film Festival, Erika de Hadeln negotiated with the film authorities in East Europe and Russia — and worked with documentary filmmakers including Joris Ivens, Roman Karmen, Georges Rouquier, Basil Wright, and Henri Storck. The event served as a template for film festivals that followed, including those in Amsterdam and Munich.

Each year, the festival invites and pays tribute to a guest of honor who has made significant contributions in the field of documentary and/or fiction films. The honoree is awarded the prestigious Honorary Award (previously the “Prix Maître du Réel”). Past recipients include Claire Denis, Werner Herzog, Claire Simon, Peter Greenaway, Alain Cavalier, Barbet Schroeder, and Richard Dindo.

Visions du Réel is part of the Doc Alliance – a creative partnership between seven European documentary film festivals.

== Sections ==
- International Feature Film Competition;
- Burning Lights International Competition;
- National Competition;
- International Medium Length and Short Film Competition;
- Opening Scenes;
- Grand Angle;
- Latitudes;
- VdR-Industry.

== Awards ==
- International Feature Film Competition
  - Sesterce d’or — Best feature film
  - Jury Prize — Most innovative feature film
  - Special Mention
  - Interreligious Award
- Burning Lights International Competition
  - Sesterce d’or — Best medium length or feature film
  - Jury Prize — Most innovative medium length or feature film
  - Special Mention
- National Competition
  - Sesterce d’or — Best medium length or feature film
  - Jury Prize — Most innovative feature film
  - Special Mention
- International Medium Length & Short Film Competition
  - Sesterce d’or — Best medium length film
  - Jury Prize — Most innovative medium length film
  - Special Mention
  - Sesterce d’argent — Best short film
  - Youth Jury Prize — Most innovative short film
- Grand Angle
  - Sesterce d’argent Prix du Public — Best feature film
- VdR Industry
  - VdR-Pitching Award
  - VdR-Work in Progress
  - Opening Scenes
  - TËNK Post-production Award
  - HEAD–Genève Postproduction Award
  - DAE Encouragement Award
  - DOK Leipzig Award
  - Unifrance Doc Award

== Festival team ==
=== Presidents ===
- 1969–1973: Bernard Glasson
- 1974–1981: Maurice Ruey
- 1982: Denys Gilliéron
- 1983–1991: Armand Forel
- 1992–1997: Gaston Nicole
- 1998–2001: Jérôme Bontron
- 2002–2003: Peter Tschopp
- 2004–2009: Jean Schmutz
- 2009–2019: Claude Ruey
- since 2019: Raymond Loretan

=== Directors ===
- 1969–1979: Moritz de Hadeln
- 1980–1994: Erika de Hadeln
- 1994–2010: Jean Perret
- 2010–2017: Luciano Barisone
- since 2018: Emilie Bujès
