= Cinekid Festival =

Media festival for children in the Netherlands

- Location: Amsterdam, Netherlands
- Founded: 1986
- Language: Dutch; English
- Website: http://www.cinekid.nl/professionals

The Cinekid Festival is the largest international film, television and new media festival for children aged 4 to 14 held at the Westergasfabriek in Amsterdam, Netherlands. It started as a small children's film festival and has now grown into a large organisation that develops activities for children in the areas of film, television and new media throughout the year. These activities are presented alongside the festival, whereas the festival itself screens films from all over the world and a selection of the best television programs for children. It also organises several new media activities. Each year the festival is attended by over 50,000 children, parents and (international) guests.

== Cinekid Foundation ==
The Cinekid Foundation is the organisation behind the festival and accompanying activities. The foundation's goal is to improve the quality of visual culture for children as well as to stimulate children's active and creative participation in the media in order to strengthen their position in relation to the media.

To achieve these goals, Cinekid's core activities include:

1. Festival The Cinekid Film, Television and New Media Festival is the main event each year. It is preceded by a series of school screenings throughout Amsterdam and a satellite program held in 30 cities throughout the Netherlands: Cinekid On Location.

2. Cinekid for Professionals The Cinekid for Professionals Conference is a new addition to Cinekid's activities. The conference has a seminar program and co-production markets where media professionals can view a selection of children's films and television programs.

3. Development and renewal Cinekid focuses on development of the intercultural field defined as Child and Media. This is a central element in Cinekid's core activities and includes trainings, test, knowledge, development and innovation programs.

== Media Literacy ==
Cinekid focuses on media education through broad culture participation. Children from all layers of society are allowed festival participation through leading discussions, voting, creating media productions, talking to industry representatives and (child) actors, joining workshops etc. In order to introduce diverse quality media productions, passive participation included, Cinekid aims to stimulate less accessible genres like child documentaries and cultural interactive media as well.

A tool for this is Cinekid Studio, an interactive environment which allows children to create their own media productions throughout the year. The goal is to improve media consciousness in a playful way. Cinekid Studio is part of the media literacy program that Cinekid offers.

The Cinekid Klappers is a children's film canon, an international list of around one hundred films that are considered essential. The list has been compiled by a broad commission of experts and consists of high quality contemporary and older films, for different age groups and with several themes.

== Prizes ==
Cinekid awards prizes in three categories:

Film

Cinekid Lion
jury award
Cinekid Lion
audience award

Television

Cinekid Kinderkast
jury award fiction
Cinekid Kinderkast
jury award non-fiction
Cinekid Kinderkast
audience award fiction
Cinekid Kinderkast
audience award non-fiction
Golden Cinekid Kinderkast

New Media

Cinekid New Media Award
jury award
Cinekid New Media Award
audience award

The 2010 edition of the festival will be the first to award a 'Best Dutch Family Film' prize. The winner will be selected by both a jury and the audience.

== Past winners ==
Cinekid Lion

1987 Jury award - De jonge magiër, Waldemar Dziki, Polen, 1987
1988 Jury award - Mio mijn Mio, Vladimir Grammatikov, Rusland/Zweden, 1987
1989 Jury award - Après la Guerre, Jean-Loup Hubert, Frankrijk, 1989
Audience award - Gouden Regen, Søren Kragh-Jacobsen, Denemarken, 1988
1990 Jury award - Mama Mia en ik, Erik Clausen, Denemarken, 1989
Audience award - Het mirakel van Valby, Ake Sandgren, Denemarken/Zweden, 1989
1991 Jury award - Waar is het huis van mijn vriend?, Abbas Kiarostami, Iran, 1987
Audience award - Het heimwee van Walerian Wrobel, Rolf Schübel, Duitsland, 1990
1992 Jury award - Het Zakmes, Ben Sombogaart, Nederland, 1991
Audience award - Little Nemo, William T. Hurtz/Masami Hata, Amerika/Japan, 1992
1993 Jury award - Een brief uit de hemel, Wang Junzheng, China, 1992
Audience award - De zilveren hengst, John Tatoulis, Australie, 1992
1994 Jury award - Karakum, Arend Agthe, Duitsland/Turkmenistan, 1993
Jury award - Killer Kid, Gilles de Maistre, Frankrijk, 1994
Audience award - Corrina, Corrina, Jessie Nelson, Amerika, 1994
1995 Jury award - Lang leve de Koningin, Esmé Lammers, Nederland, 1995
Audience award - The Cure, Peter Horton, Amerika, 1995
1996 Jury award - Kijk ik vlieg, Vibeke Gad, Denemarken, 1996
Audience award - Mathilda, Danny DeVito, Amerika, 1996
1997 Jury award - Oog van de Adelaar, Peter Flinth, Denemarken/Noorwegen/Zweden, 1996
Audience award - Selma & Johanna, Ingela Magner, Zweden, 1997
1998 Jury award - Op eigen houtje, Lone Scherfig, Denemarken, 1998
Audience award - Ikke niet, Ari Kristinsson, IJsland, 1997
1999 Jury award - Kirikou en de heks, Michel Ocelot, Frankrijk, 1998
Audience award - Valkenhart, Lars Hesselholdt, Denemarken, 1999
2000 Jury award - Zomerkinderen, Ulf Malmros, Zweden, 2000
Audience award - Mariken, André van Buren, Nederland, 2000
2001 Jury award - Een hand vol gras, Roland Susi Richter, Duitsland/Iran, 2000
Audience award - Die nieuwe vader, Andrea Katzenberger, Duitsland, 2000
2002 Jury award - De Vogeltjesvanger, Rahbar Ghanbari, Iran, 2002
Audience award - Kraak!, Hans Fabian Wullenweber, Denemarken, 2002
2003 Jury award - Wallah Be, Pia Bocin, Denemarken, 2002
Audience award - De zomer van de wolf, Peder Norland, Noorwegen, 2003
2004 Jury award - 4th floor, Antonio Mercero, Spanje, 2002
Audience award - Bombay Dreams, Lena Koppel, Sweden, 2004
2005 Jury award - De kleine Italiaan, Andrei Kravchuk, Rusland, 2005
Audience award - Knetter, Martin Koolhoven, Nederland, 2005
Audience award - Vrienden voor het leven, Arne Lindtner Næss, Noorwegen, 2004
2006 Jury award - We shall overcome, Niels Arden Oplev, Denemarken, 2006
Audience award - De verloren schat van de Tempelridder, Kasper Barfoed, Denemarken, 2006
2007 Jury award - Max Minsky and Me, Anna Justice, Duitsland, 2006
Audience award - Kidz in da Hood, Catti Edfeldt/Ylva Gustavsson, Zweden, 2006
2008 Jury award - Niko – The Way to the Stars, Michael Hegner/Kari Juusonen, Finland, 2008
Audience award - Niko – The Way to the Stars, Michael Hegner/Kari Juusonen, Finland, 2008
2009 Jury award - A Brand New Life, Ounie Lecomte, Frankrijk/Zuid-Korea, 2009
Audience award - De Krokodillenbende, Christian Ditter, Duitsland, 2009

Cinekid Kinderkast

1979 Jury award - J.J. de Bom, Aart Staartjes/Frans Boelen, VARA
1981 Jury award - De Zesde Klas, Ruud Schuitemaker, IKON
1983 Jury award - Het Jeugdjournaal, Arno Wamsteeker, NOS
1985 Jury award - Dag Huis, Dag Tuin, Dag Opbergschuur, Burny Bos, AVRO
1987 Jury award - Niet Thuis, Trudy van Keulen, VPRO
1988 Jury award - Meester, hij begint weer, Jos Tuerlinckx, BRTN
1989 Jury award - Kanjers, Ruud Schuitemaker, IKON
Audience award - Superchamps!, Geert Popma, Veronica
1990 Jury award - Buurman Bolle, Ben Sombogaart, VPRO
Audience award - Rode Wangen, Ruud van Gessel, VARA
1991 Jury award - Geheim gebied, Hansje van Etten/Beatrijs Hulkes, VPRO
Audience award - De Freules, Ineke Houtman, VPRO
1992 Jury award - Het Zakmes, Ben Sombogaart, AVRO
Audience award - Dag Meneer de Koekepeer, Frans Lasès, VPRO
1993 Jury award - Idomeneo, Ineke Houtman, AVRO
Audience award - Het Klokhuis, Piet Geelhoed, NPS
1994 Jury award non-fiction - Pootjes, Eric van de Broek, VPRO
Jury award fiction - Tijger, André van Duuren, VPRO
Audience award non-fiction - Ik hou van lawaai, Bob Entrop, IKON
Audience award fiction - Kinderen voor Kinderen: een reis door de tijd, Loek Marreck, VARA/BRTN
1995 Jury award non-fiction - Het Jeugdjournaal, Rob Maas, NOS
Jury award fiction - Legende van de Bokkerijders, Karst van der Meulen, KRO/IKON/BRTN
Audience award non-fiction - Het Jeugdjournaal, Rob Maas, NOS
Audience award fiction - Legende van de Bokkerijders, KRO/IKON/BRTN
1996 Jury award non-fiction - Tussen eten en afwas, Rob Entrop, IKON
Jury award fiction - Buiten de zone, Luc Coghe, BRTN
Audience award non-fiction - Toen ‘t vliegtuig viel, Wilma Lighthart, VPRO
Audience award fiction - Dag Juf tot morgen, Ben Sombogaart, AVRO
1997 Audience award non-fiction - De kist, Wouter Peters, TROS
Audience award fiction - Madelief 11, Ineke Houtman/Rita Horst, VPRO
1998 Jury award non-fiction - Tijd van je leven, Noud Holtman, Veronica
Jury award fiction - Sinterklaas bezoekt Sesamstraat, Jan Keja, NPS
Audience award non-fiction - Het Klokhuis, Piet Geelhoed, NPS
Audience award fiction - Loenatik 11, Mette Bouhuijs, VPRO
1999 Jury award non-fiction - Pierlala, Boudewijn Koole, VPRO
Jury award fiction - Ik dicht, Jet Dijkstra, VPRO
Audience award non-fiction - Groot Licht, Wouters Peters, KRO/VRT-Ketnet
Audience award fiction - Sinterklaas in Sesamstraat, Jan Keja, NPS
2000 Jury award non-fiction - Groot Licht, Wouters Peters, KRO/VRT-Ketnet
Jury award fiction - De Daltons, Rita Horst, VPRO
Audience award non-fiction - Het Klokhuis, Piet Geelhoed, NPS
Audience award fiction - Madelief, krassen op het tafelblad, Ineke Houtman, VPRO
2001 Jury award non-fiction - Het Klokhuis, Puck de Leeuw, NPS
Jury award fiction - Poppentje, Camiel Schouwenaar/Roberta Amador, VPRO
Audience award non-fiction - Willem Wever, Ina Metselaar, NCRV
Audience award fiction - Loenatik, Mette Bouhuijs, VPRO
2002 Jury award non-fictionDe achtertuin van Jan Wolkers, Machteld van Gelder, VPRO
Jury award fiction - Poppentje 2, Camiel Schouwenaar/Roberta Amador, VPRO
Audience award non-fiction - Het Klokhuis, Piet Geelhoed, NPS
Audience award fiction - De familie van der Ploeg, Lydia Roothaan, VPRO
2003 Jury award non-fiction - Nationale Wetenschapsquiz, Loes Wormmeester, VPRO
Jury award fiction - Ik ben Willem, Mijke de Jong, VPRO
Audience award non-fiction - Zig Zag, afl. Batavia, Dolf Gerbers, KRO
Audience award fiction - De club van Sinterklaas, Armando de Boer/Liesbeth Roelofs, Fox Kids
2004 Jury award non-fiction - Meisjes, Menna Laura Meijer, IKON
Jury award fiction - Dunya & Desie, Dana Nechushtan, NPS
Audience award non-fiction - NOS Jeugdjournaal overzicht 2003, NPS
Audience award fiction - Zoop, Johan Nijenhuis, Nickelodeon
2005 Jury award non-fiction - Valerie, Mirjam Marks, VPRO
Jury award fiction - Lekker Dansen, Maxim Hartman, VPRO
Audience award non-fiction - Het Jeugdjournaal, Tsunami, Liesbeth Staats/Michelle Veldkamp, NPS
Audience award fiction - Hotnews.nl, Ruud Schuurman, Jetix
2006 Golden Kinderkast - Docklands: Nina en Jelle, Ties Schenk, VPRO
Jury award non-fiction - Docklands: Nina en Jelle, Ties Schenk, VPRO
Jury award fiction - Overleven in NL: Het busje, Katinka de Maar, VPRO
Audience award non-fiction - Ayla, het tsunamimeisje, Wilma Ligthart, VPRO
Audience award fiction - De club van Sinterklaas, Liesbeth Roelofs, Jetix
2007 Golden Kinderkast - Donkeygirl, Ties Schenk, VPRO
Jury award non-fiction - Bloot, Mischa Kamp, VPRO
Jury award fiction - Adriaan, Mischa Kamp, KRO
Audience award non-fiction - Anne Frank Special, Yvonne Smits, NPS
Audience award fiction - Het huis Anubis, Dennis Bots, Nickelodeon
2008 Golden Kinderkast - De Daltons, de jongensjaren, Rita Horst, VPRO
Jury award non-fiction - Overleven in Nederland: RAUW, Anneloek Sollart, VPRO
Jury award fiction - De Daltons, de jongensjaren, Rita Horst, VPRO
Audience award non-fiction - Taarten van Abel - Zomerspecial, Onno Krijnen, VPRO
2009 Golden Kinderkast - Het Klokhuis, aflevering: ‘Wakduiken’, Uif Putters/Leo de Groot/Kees Prins, NPS
Jury award non-fiction - Brieven uit Nicaragua, Stef Biemans, VPRO
Jury award fiction - Sterke verhalen uit Zoutvloed, Iván López Núnez/Ineke Houtman/Ties Schenk, VPRO
Audience award non-fiction - Laura & Anne 4 ever, Susan Koenen RKK/KRO
Audience award fiction - Puppy Patrol, Annemarie Mooren, Nickelodeon
2010 Audience award fiction - Spangas, NCRV
2011 Golden Kinderkast - Ik heb een droom, Jan-Willem Wit & Joost Gulien, VPRO
Jury award non-fiction - I'm Never Afraid! (Ik ben echt niet bang!), Willem Baptist, VPRO
Jury award fiction - De avonturen van Pim & Pom, Gioia Smid, Nickelodeon
Audience award non-fiction - Checkpoint, Jan Pool, EO
Audience award fiction - Raveleijn, Anne van der Linden, RTL4

Cinekid New Media award

2000 Jury award - Alfabet, Tivola/KEEC
Audience award - De Sims, Electronic Arts
2001 Jury award - Het mysterieuze eiland van oom Ernest, Mediamix
Audience award - Pettson & Findus gaan klussen, Lannoo
2002 Jury award - Gast, Mindscape
Audience award - Harry Potter en de steen der wijzen, Electronic Arts
2003 Jury award - Alphons & zijn vrienden, Lannoo
Audience award - Flipperfun, Lannoo
2004 Jury award - De verborgen tempel van oom Ernest, Mediamix
Audience award - Harry Potter en de gevangen van Azkaban, Electronic Arts
2005 Jury award - SketchStudio, IJsfontein interactive media/NPS
Audience award - De Sims 2, Electronic Arts
2006 Jury award - Nintendogs, Nintendo
Jury award - De orde van GIS, Ranj Serious Games
Audience award - Mijn Renstal, Mindscape
2007 Jury award - Hello you!, Ranj Serious Games/Uitgeverij Malmberg
Audience award - Fifa 07, Electronic Arts
2008 Jury award - NPS Gamestudio, Ijsfontein Interactieve Media/NPS
Audience award - Mario Kart Wii, Nintendo
2009 Jury award - Kinderen voor Kinderen Karaoke, Lost Boys/VARA
Audience award - SpangaS, /NCRV

== See also ==
- List of film festivals in Europe
