= Sławomir Smołokowski =

Polish entrepreneur (born 1954)

Sławomir Smołokowski, born Vyacheslav Smołokowski (born 1954 in Zaporizhia) is a Polish entrepreneur of Ukrainian origin, a musician by profession.

== Curriculum vitae ==
Before 1985, he lived in the USSR, where he worked in his profession, including collaborating with Sofia Rotaru. From the beginning of his business activity, his closest associate was Grigory Yankilevich. In the 1990s, they traded goods imported to Russia (household appliances, consumer electronics, clothing, etc.). In Tyumen, Siberia, they began trading with oil sector entrepreneurs who, due to a lack of cash, settled their accounts in oil, which Smolokovsky and Yankilevich then sold in Europe.

He imported goods sold in Russia from Poland, where he married and obtained citizenship in 1993, taking the name Sławomir. Together with Jankilewicz and two other businessmen, he founded the J&S company, which supplied oil to Poland. By the late 1990s, its share of the Polish market was approximately 90%. Due to the lack of development prospects for the Polish market, the two founded Mercuria Energy Group in Switzerland in 2004.

In 2021, he was ranked 31st on the Forbes magazine list of the richest Poles with a fortune valued at PLN 1.7 billion.
