= Mathijsen =

Mathijsen is a Dutch patronymic surname (Matthijs's son) equivalent to Matthews. Some variant forms are Mathijssen, Matthijs, Matthijsen, Matthijsse, Matthijssen, Matthysen and Matthysse. Notable people with the surname include:

Mathijsen

- Antonius Mathijsen (1805–1878), Dutch army surgeon
- Django Mathijsen (born 1966), Dutch science fiction author
- Joris Mathijsen (born 1980), Dutch football defender
- Marita Mathijsen (born 1944), Dutch literary historian
- Petrus Servatius Renaldus Franciscus Mathijsen (born 1924), Dutch paratrooper Captain, helped found the European Union

Mathijssen

- Danny Mathijssen (born 1983), Dutch football midfielder and manager
- Jacky Mathijssen (born 1963), Belgian football player and manager

Matthijsse

- Margriet Matthijsse (born 1977), Dutch competitive sailor

Matthysen

- Elise Matthysen (born 1992), Belgian breaststroke swimmer
- Hugo Matthysen (born 1956), Belgian singer, guitarist, columnist, writer, and actor

Matthysse

- Lucas Matthysse (1982), Argentine boxer, brother of Walter
- Walter Matthysse (1978), Argentine boxer, brother of Lucas

== See also ==
- Matthijs, given name and patronymic surname
- Matthys, patronymic surname
- Mathiesen
- Mathisen
- Matthiesen
