= Siege of Groenlo =

Siege of Grol (Groenlo) may refer to:

- The capture of Grol (Groenlo) in 1580 by Count Rennenberg (first Spanish occupation)
- The Siege of Grol (Groenlo) in 1595 by Maurice of Orange (unsuccessful)
- The Siege of Grol (Groenlo) in 1597 by Maurice of Orange
- The first Siege of Grol (Groenlo) in 1606, by Ambrogio Spinola
- The second Siege of Grol (Groenlo) in 1606, by Maurice of Orange (unsuccessful)
- The Siege of Grol (Groenlo) in 1627 by Frederick Henry
- The Siege of Grol (Groenlo) in 1672 by Bernhard von Galen, prince-bishop of Münster
- The Slag om Grolle, the reenactment of the 1627 Siege, held every few years
