= Matthijs =

Matthijs (pronounced [mɑˈtɛis]), also spelled Mattijs, Mathijs and Matijs, is the Dutch form of the masculine given name "Matthew". It can also be a surname. Notable people with the name include:

== Given name ==
Matthijs/Matthys

- Matthijs Accama (1702–1783), Dutch painter
- Matthijs Balen (1684–1766), Dutch painter
- Matthijs van den Bergh (1618–1687), Dutch painter
- Matthijs van den Bos (born 1969), Dutch academic
- Mattijs Branderhorst (born 1993), Dutch footballer
- Matthijs Bril (1550–1583), Flemish painter
- Matthijs Brouwer (born 1980), Dutch field hockey player
- Matthijs Büchli (born 1992), Dutch track cyclist
- Matthijs Clavan (1929–1983), Dutch footballer
- Matthijs Cock (c.1505–1548), Flemish landscape painter and draughtsman
- Matthijs van Dulcken (c.1560s–1634), Dutch mayor and governor
- Matthijs Hannink (born 1996), Dutch artist and designer
- Matthijs Harings (1593–1667), Dutch painter
- Matthijs van Heijningen (born 1944), Dutch film producer
- Matthijs van Heijningen, Jr. (born 1965), Dutch filmmaker
- Matthijs Huizing (born 1960), Dutch politician
- O. J. Matthijs Jolles (1911–1968) American translator from German
- Matthijs Kleyn (born 1979), Dutch television presenter
- Matthijs Langhedul (died circa 1636), Flemish organ builder
- Matthijs de Ligt (born 1999), Dutch footballer
- Matthijs Maris (1839–1917), Dutch painter
- Matthijs van Miltenburg (born 1972), Dutch politician
- Matthijs Musson (1598–1678), Dutch painter
- Matthijs Naiveu (1647–1726), Dutch painter
- Matthijs van Nieuwkerk (born 1960), Dutch television presenter
- Matthijs Pool (1676–1732), Dutch engraver
- Matthijs Quast (died 1641), Dutch explorer
- Matthijs Röling (born 1943), Dutch painter
- Matthijs van de Sande Bakhuyzen (born 1988), Dutch actor
- Matthijs van Schelven (born 1989), Dutch cricket player
- Matthijs Siegenbeek (1774–1854), Dutch academic
- Matthijs Vellenga (born 1977), Dutch rower
- Matthijs Vermeulen (1888–1967), Dutch composer and music journalist
- Matthijs Verschoor (born 1955), Dutch pianist
- Matthijs Wulfraet (1648–1727), Dutch painter

Mathijs

- Mathijs Bouman (born 1966), Dutch economist and journalist
- Mathijs Heyligers (born 1957), Dutch violin maker
- Mathijs Tielemans (born 2002), Dutch footballer

Mattijs

- Mattijs Branderhorst (born 1993), Dutch footballer
- Mattijs Visser (born 1958), Dutch organiser of art exhibitions and performances

Matijs

- Matijs Dierickx (born 1991), Belgian badminton player

== Surname ==
Matthijs

- Abraham Matthijs (1581–1649), Flemish painter
- Paul Matthijs (born 1976), Dutch football player
- Rudy Matthijs (born 1959), Belgian road bicycle racer

Mathijs

- Ernest Mathijs (born c.1968), Canadian film professor

== See also ==
- Mathies
- Mattheus
- Matthias
- Matthew (name)
- Matthys (as a surname)
