= Mathys =

Mathys is a family surname that could refer to:

== Surname ==
- Charlie Mathys, American professional football player
- Marco Mathys, Swiss footballer
- Lucien Mathys, Belgian racing cyclist
- Maude Mathys, Swiss ski mountaineer
- Melanie Mathys, Swiss female canoeist

== Other ==
- Mathys Bank, Antarctic rock ridge
- Mathys Zyn Loop, South African town

== See also ==
- Mathies
- Mathy
- Matthijs
- Matthys
