= Danny Matthys =

Flemish-Belgian visual artist

- Born: Daniel Matthys; 10 June 1947; Zottegem
- Education: Hogeschool Gent, Hogeschool voor Kunsten en Architectuur Gent
- Known for: sculpture, photography, polaroid, video, drawing installation and performance
- Notable work: World Beauties
- Movement: Mixed-Media

Danny Matthys (born 1947 in Zottegem) is a Flemish - Belgian visual artist, which was originally known as conceptual artist of international reputation. In the beginning of his career in the 1960s, he was a pioneer in Polaroid art and Video art.

== Biography ==
In 1977, there were two simultaneous exhibition in the Van Abbemuseum in Eindhoven and the Bonnefantenmuseum in Maastricht, in the Netherlands, with mainly conceptual work. He is a conceptual artist with respect in Europe. In that time, the Dutch Ger van Elk and Jan Dibbets are also important as European conceptual artists and Joseph Kosuth is a big name in New York City. From the mid-1970s Danny Matthys created the development of artistic training at the Urban Arts Institute in Ghent. Given the many winners in several national art competitions it was quite valued. His partner there was Eric De Volder, a locally very famous Flemish experimental theater maker. It was a successful educational experiment that was closely linked to the brand new Flemish Ministry of Culture and Flemish Affairs, a forerunner of the current Flemish Culture Ministry.

From the 1980s, Matthys uses more traditional techniques. Assemblage (art) on the basis of strange antique photo series, collage photo mozaiec and oil painting do their entry in his oeuvre.

=== Australia ===
In the late 1980s, Matthys made several trips to Australia. He has seriously considered emigrating. He has had exhibitions in, among others, the Art Gallery of New South Wales, together with the starting up Wim Delvoye and created projects with the Australian film - composer Peter Best. He has also worked on the old and the new art of Indigenous Australians. He shares experience with Flemish - Belgian dr. Georges Petitjean, who as curator of the Museum of Contemporary Aboriginal Art in Utrecht, Netherlands, curated a number of exhibitions in which Indigenous Australian and European art were included. However, several serious setbacks in the private atmosphere forced Danny Matthys finally to return to Europe.

=== Art Trip ===
He later reworks his former collage and even Polaroid art - series with a very personal pointillist technique, in which he has owned several old and modern aboriginal - techniques. Since the early 1990s, he started with what is still best described as Mosaic or monumental 'tile fragments-Mosaic'. This process also makes a connection with his older monumental photo - collage - work and his more recent pointillistic method. It gives a strong sense of indestructible timelessness. His early video from the 1960s and early 1970s was restored and better protected from the ravages of time by Argos Foundation in Brussels, with the support of the Flemish Community

=== Curriculum ===
His work is part of several museum collections such as the Museum of Modern Art, Antwerp and many private collections in Europe and abroad. Danny Matthys is today a major name in the Flemish "Art - lending " project. Matthys discontinued a few years ago a rich career as a lecturer in art education. He was co-founder and professor of the Department Mixed Media within the KASK (art academy) of Hogeschool Gent. On the left front of the SMAK in Ghent is a huge work of him, made up of dozens of life-sized busts in pigmented concrete that is quite indestructible fixed in front of the famous museum. The work was previously conceived in an impressive horizontal drafting. Founding SMAK Director and Curator of Documenta IX in Kassel in 1992.Jan Hoet wanted ultimately to hang it on the museum left frontwall.

=== Documenta 14 ===
His well-known conceptual photo work 'Brabantdam 59, Downstairs-Upstairs' of 1975, part of the permanent collection of the Museum of Contemporary Art Antwerp M HKA, was loaned for a long term at the National Museum of Contemporary Art, Athens (EMST) and was selected for the Fridericianum during the Documenta 14 2017 in the German Kassel. Documenta is the most important international contemporary art manifestation worldwide.

=== Sports, study and training ===
In his youth, Matthys was a gifted cyclist in the category of 'promises', together with André Dierickx, which later won famous classics such as the La Flèche Wallonne, but a very serious accident during the last years of his humanities studies in Ghent and a long rehabilitation, gave his life a strong new direction.

Matthys first studied Textile Design at the Hogeschool Gent and then at both of the School of Arts and Architecture and the Hogeschool Gent completed higher art formation and training in the monumental arts.

Famous names from his professional relations are Hugo Debaere(† 1994), Roger Raveel, Marthe Wery, Jan Vercruysse, Jan Fabre, Joseph Beuys(† 1986) and Nick Ervinck.

== References, sources and external links ==
- Packed
- / Art Gallery of New South Wales, Australia
- / Nangara Museum Dhondt Dhaenens Deurle Belgium
- Open Library
- Argos Art Preservation Brussels
- Packed Danny Matthys
- MUHKA Museum of Modern Art of Antwerp - Permanent Collection
- / Kunstonline - Important Belgian Art Database
- / Danny Matthys SMAK
- / Hugo Debaere SMAK - Dutch - English
- Georges Petitjean
- Ghent Art Days 1986 Chamres D'Amis
- PMMK Museum of Modern Art of West Flandres County, Ostend Belgium
- Museum voor Contemporary Aborigines Art at Utrecht, The Netherlands
- Documenta 14 Shanghaidaily
