= Berglund =

Origin
- Meaning: 'mountain grove'
- Region of origin: Sweden

Berglund is a surname of Swedish origin. It means 'mountain grove' (berg means 'mountain' or 'hill', and lund means 'grove of trees', derived from the Old Norse lundr).

== Geographical distribution ==
As of 2014, 64.1% of all known bearers of the surname Berglund were residents of Sweden, 23.8% of the United States, 4.8% of Norway, 2.5% of Finland and 1.6% of Canada.

In Sweden, the frequency of the surname was higher than national average in the following counties:

1. Västernorrland (1:150)
2. Norrbotten (1:191)
3. Västerbotten (1:216)
4. Gävleborg (1:260)
5. Dalarna (1:271)
6. Jämtland (1:291)
7. Värmland (1:380)
8. Västmanland (1:408)
9. Uppsala (1:438)
10. Södermanland (1:451)

== People ==
In sports:

- Anna-Lisa Berglund (born ?), Swedish archer
- Art Berglund (1940–2020), retired Canadian-American ice hockey player
- Bo Berglund (born 1955), retired Swedish professional ice hockey player
- Bruno Berglund, Swedish rally car racer
- Charles Berglund (born 1965), retired Swedish professional ice hockey player
- Christian Berglund (born 1980), Swedish professional ice hockey player
- Claes Berglund, Swedish ski orienteerer
- Elina Berglund (born 1984), particle physicist and entrepreneur
- Eva Berglund (born 1984), Swedish swimmer
- Fredrik Berglund (born 1979), Swedish professional football (soccer) player
- Hans Berglund (1918–2006), Swedish sprint canoer
- Johan Berglund (born 1983), Swedish bandy player
- Kalle Berglund, Swedish athlete
- Marianne Berglund (born 1963), Swedish cyclist
- Maud Berglund (1934–2000), Swedish swimmer
- Oscar Berglund (born 1984), Swedish football (soccer) goaltender
- Patrik Berglund (born 1988), Swedish ice hockey player
- Tabita Berglund, Norwegian conductor
- Per-Arne Berglund (1927–2002), Swedish javelin thrower, silver at the 1950 European Championships
- Tomas Berglund (born ?), Swedish ice hockey player

In music:

- Dan Berglund (born 1963), Swedish jazz contrabassist
- Eric Berglund (born 1981), Swedish musician in the band The Tough Alliance
- Anders Berglund (born 1948), Swedish composer, arranger, musician, and conductor
- Bernhard Berglund (1891–1944), Swedish teacher and composer
- Dan Berglund (born 1954), Finnish-Swedish singer
- Michael Berglund (born 1978) American music producer and studio engineer under pseudonym "Zebulon Dak"
- Joel Berglund (1903–1985), Swedish opera singer
- Lily Berglund (1928–2010), Swedish singer and actress
- Olle Berglund (1908–1998), Swedish hymn writer
- Paavo Berglund (1929–2012), Finnish conductor
- Ruth Berglund (1897–1984), Swedish opera singer

In film and television:

- Bertil Berglund (1898–1979), Swedish actor
- Björn Berglund (actor) (1904–1968), Swedish actor and singer
- Elsa Berglund (née Wickman, 1885–1967), Swedish actress, married actor Erik Berglund in 1912
- Erik "Bullen" Berglund (1887–1963), Swedish actor and director
- Ernst Berglund (1888–1971), Swedish actor
- Harald Berglund (1904–1980), Swedish cinematographer
- Kelli Berglund (born 1996), American actress
- Pär Brundin (born 1972 as Pär Berglund), Swedish director and actor
- Pelle Berglund (born 1939), Swedish director, producer, and screenwriter
- Svenn Berglund (born 1939), Norwegian dancer and actor
- Timothy Björklund (born ?), American director, sometimes credited as Timothy Berglund
- Anna Sophia Berglund (born 1986), American actress and model

In politics:

- Alfred Berglund (Minnesota politician) (1871–1962), American farmer and politician
- Carl Berglund (1859–1921), Swedish politician
- Elmer E. Berglund (1924–2008), American politician
- Helge Berglund (1907–?), Swedish politician
- Jan Berglund (1864–?), Swedish politician
- Mats Berglund (born 1970), Swedish politician
- Matteus Berglund (1898–1981), Swedish politician
- Mona Berglund Nilsson (born 1942), Swedish politician
- Rune Berglund (born 1939), Swedish politician

In literature and journalism:

- Anne-Marie Berglund (1952–2020), Finnish-Swedish author
- Björn Berglund (author) (born 1938), Swedish author
- Christer Berglund (born 1950), Swedish journalist
- Fredrik Falk (born 1950 as Fredrik Berglund), Swedish journalist, author, and copywriter
- Jan-Erik Berglund (born 1957), Finnish journalist and actor
- Karin Berglund (born 1937), Swedish journalist, author, and photographer
- Lars Berglund (1921–2002), Swedish author, screenwriter, and playwright

In fiction:

- The Berglund family, protagonists of Jonathan Franzen's novel Freedom

In other fields:

- Alfred Berglund (admiral) (1862–1945), Norwegian admiral
- Erik Berglund (furniture) (1921-?), Swedish furniture maker
- Nils Berglund (1923-?), Swedish illustrator and graphic artist
- Sten Berglund (born 1947), Swedish political scientist
