= Gösta Winbergh =

Swedish tenor

- Born: 30 December 1943; Stockholm, Sweden
- Died: 18 March 2002 (aged 58); Vienna, Austria
- Occupation: Tenor
- Spouse: Elena Winbergh
- Children: 3

Gösta Winbergh (30 December 1943 – 18 March 2002) was a Swedish tenor.

== Early life ==
Winbergh was born in Stockholm. There was no musical tradition in Winbergh's family. He himself was a building engineer when he watched his first opera performance in 1967; the experience so moved him that he decided on an operatic career. Accordingly, he applied for the opera class at Sweden's Royal Academy of Music. He trained at the school between 1969-71. Winbergh studied voice with opera singers Joel Berglund and Erik Saedén. He began singing at the Royal Opera in Stockholm, and gradually began to receive international attention in the 1980s when he guest performed on stages abroad. Copenhagen, Aix-en-Provence, San Francisco and in 1980, Glyndebourne, where he sang Belmonte. He later worked several times at the opera house in Zürich and at the Metropolitan Opera in New York City, singing Mozart's Don Giovanni, Wagner's Lohengrin, Verdi's Rigoletto and Puccini's Turandot.

== Career ==
For the first two-thirds of his 30-year career, Gösta Winbergh specialized in Mozart's operas. He played Don Ottavio in Don Giovanni at the Met, at the Salzburg Festival, in Houston and Chicago, Berlin and Barcelona. He sang Ferrando in Cosi fan tutte at the Drottninghom Court Theatre and Tamino in The Magic Flute for his debut at La Scala, Milan. Other Mozart roles in his repertory were Idomeneo, Mitridate and Titus.

He also sang lyric roles such as Almaviva in Il barbiere di Siviglia, the Duke in Rigoletto, Alfredo in La traviata, Nemorino in L'elisir d'amore and Lenski in Eugene Onegin. Then in 1991 at Zurich he sang his first Lohengrin, and moved on to other heavier roles such as the Emperor in Die Frau ohne Schatten, Don Jose in Carmen and Florestan in Fidelio.

In 1982, Winbergh made his Chicago debut as Ferrando, and his Covent Garden debut in the title role of La Clemenza di Tito. The following year he sang the title role of Mitridate, re di Ponto at the Schwetzingen Festival, and made his Metropolitan debut as Don Ottavio. In 1984, he sang Tamino in Salzburg and Ferrando at Drottningholm, as well as Admetus in Gluck's Alceste in Geneva. In 1985, he performed as a soloist in Mozart's Coronation Mass at the Vatican for the Pope. He made his debut at La Scala in 1985 as well, singing Tamino, and returned there in 1990 for the title role of Idomeneo, repeating the role at Madrid the following year.

== Personal life ==
Winbergh married Elena, and had a son and a daughter with her. His son, Gunnar, is best known for playing The Black Falcon in the 2006 film Flyboys.

== Death ==
Winbergh suffered a heart attack and died in Vienna in 2002, where he was performing Fidelio at the time. To honor his memory and opera work, The Gösta Winbergh Award (GWA) was instituted in Sweden after his death; the award is each year handed out to young aspiring tenors through an arranged singing contest that takes place at the opera stage Confidencen, at the Ulriksdal Royal Estate (a few miles outside Stockholm). The first prize consists of 14.000 Euro ($15,355 in American dollars) and the second prize of 6.000 Euro ($6,580 in American dollars).
