= Hugo Debaere =

Belgian contemporary artist

- Born: Hugo Debaere Bogaert; May 9, 1958; Ghent
- Died: March 15, 1994 (aged 36); Ghent
- Education: Autodidact
- Known for: sculpture, photography, neon, video, drawing installation and performance
- Notable work: Big Elephant, Breast, Snake, Peau Allumees
- Movement: Mixed-Media

Hugo Debaere (1958–1994) was a Belgian contemporary artist. His practice spanned a broad range of media, including painting, sculpture, photography, neon, video, drawing, printmaking, installation art, mixed media and performance.

== Study and autodidact ==
He was born in Ghent, and studied at the Secondary Art Institute (SSKI) of Ghent. A successful and fruitful artistic - cultural educational experiment in the early 1970s that has been disbanded at the end of that decade. Due to the high artistic and general cultural level of the secondary cycle, like other fellow students, Debaere had problems to fit in the next higher cycle.

Despite the three years of intensive classic and contemporary artistic training he is largely considered as an autodidact.

== Guest lecturer at Brussels Saint Lucas Institute and artist in residence in Wiesbaden ==
Debaere was guest lecturer at the Hogeschool Sint-Lukas Brussels, Well known is the invitation to Wiesbaden, where he collaborated with his friend, the artist and his former teacher Danny Matthys. They were both 'artist in residence' in the local zoo. Debaere discovered the working with elephant - excrements at that moment.

== S.M.A.K. ==
Debaere has an important artistic legacy, located largely in Ghent SMAK, shortly after his sudden and totally unexpected death there in 1994. There were only 15 years between his first exhibition and death. He was only discovered shortly before his death (and then carefully). But that was sufficient for a massively attended funeral ceremony. In 1995 Knight Jan Hoet, the local Belgian star - curator of 'Chambres D'Amis', Documenta IX in 1992 at Kassel and 'Over the Edges', set up a first (summary) - exhibition in the Museum of Contemporary Art in Ghent, in honor of Hugo Debaere, in 1995.

== Work ==
Hugo Debaere tried to link his personal visual world to items such as the ancient cultures and his love for and deep knowledge of contemporary Africa. Hugo Debaere is related to the freedom of figurative sculptures known motifs looking like a giant breast, a cigarette-smoking squatting figure, a crushed foam elephant, a tire - snake or the 'Nose of Africa. " These images include modeled cow manure, without the suggestion of spectacle. The primary way in which he reflected impressions and thoughts on the possible significance of art for an individual, is unusual. Peaux Allumees is a typical sculpture of Debaere. The method of recovering the material is like a red thread through the production of sculptural Debaere.

== Nauman ==
The work of the contemporary American artist Bruce Nauman had some strong influence on some of his work and on his life. During youth and early artist years Kazimir Malevich and Arthur Rimbaud were important. In the 1990s Georges Bataille got strong influences.
