= Male Homosexuality in Four Societies =

1985 book by Frederick L. Whitam and Robin Mathy

Male Homosexuality in Four Societies: Brazil, Guatemala, the Philippines and the United States
- Cover of the first edition
- Authors: Frederick L. Whitam; Robin Mathy
- Language: English
- Subject: Male homosexuality
- Publisher: Praeger
- Publication date: 1985
- Publication place: United States
- Media type: Print (Hardcover and Paperback)
- Pages: 241
- ISBN: 978-0030042980

Male Homosexuality in Four Societies: Brazil, Guatemala, the Philippines and the United States is a 1985 work about male homosexuality by the sociologists Frederick L. Whitam and Robin Mathy.

== Summary ==
The authors discuss male homosexuality in four societies: Brazil, Guatemala, the Philippines, and the United States. The book takes the position that rates of homosexuality among men have been relatively stable in all cultures and across recorded history, indicating that same-sex attraction is not a socially influenced trait, but a biological one. The authors make further assertions that same-sex attracted men have a higher than average tendency to display gender-non conforming traits in their childhood (regardless of cultural upbringing and different social norms around gender performance), as well has higher rates of exhibiting 'effeminate' behaviours in adulthood. The book uses interviews and questionnaire responses to form a database for the analysis and discussion of these underlying assertions.

== Reception ==
Male Homosexuality in Four Societies received a mixed review from the sociologist Barbara Risman in Social Forces.

Risman wrote that the book provides the "strongest social-scientific argument yet made for the essentialist paradigm of sexuality" according to which sexual orientation is biologically innate" and "raises hard questions that cannot be ignored". However, she maintained that its arguments "ultimately fails on logical, theoretical, and empirical grounds." In her view, while it deserved to be commended for its complex "multi-method, cross-cultural" design, the work still suffered from "serious problems of sampling bias and analytic technique". She questioned the value of its finding that the gay men in their samples reported more "cross-gender interests" than the heterosexual controls, and accused its authors of "disregard for the large body of scholarship on sex/gender systems".

Similarly, John Gagnon's review for the American Journal of Sociology offered some praise of Whitman and Mathy's intention to undertake a fairly large study of homosexuality in the course of researching for the book but criticised the bio-essentialist conclusions they draw which connect any biological drivers which may influence same-sexual attraction with a person's ultimate choice of career or social presentation writing:

In the final analysis, I do not believe that some men are born to be hairdressers, nor do I believe that the biological tenets espoused by Whitman and Mathy will protect "homosexuals" from social persecution.
