= Mathies =

Mathies can be both a masculine given name and a surname. Notable people with the name include:

== Given name ==
- Mathies Parrott, American governor
- Mathies Skjellerup (born 1996), Danish footballer

== Surname ==
- A'dia Mathies (born 1991), American basketball player
- Archibald Mathies (1918–1944), United States Army Air Forces soldier and Medal of Honor recipient
- Christopher Columbus Mathies, American state politician
- Lukas Mathies (born 1991), Austrian alpine snowboarder
- Paul Mathies (1911–?), German footballer
- Richard A. Mathies, American chemist

== See also ==
- Mathys
- Matthys
