= Frederick L. Whitam =

American sociologist

Frederick Lee "Fred" Whitam (February 7, 1933 – July 10, 2009) was an American sociologist who studied homosexuality from a cross-cultural perspective. Scholar Paul Vasey described Whitam as "an essentialist during a time of rampant social constructionism."

== Life and career ==
Whitam was born in Natchez, Mississippi. He studied at Millsaps College, University of Chicago, Columbia University, and Indiana University, where he received a master's degree, followed by a Ph.D. in 1965.

In 1960, he was appointed assistant professor and chair of the department of sociology at Millsaps College. In 1962, he took a position at Fashion Institute of Technology. After a brief appointment at University of Texas, Austin, he accepted a position at Arizona State University in 1966 and taught there the remainder of his career. He established the department's doctoral program in 1972, became a full professor in 1986, and retired in 1997.

Whitam's early work focused on the sociology of religion before he moved into researching commonalities in male homosexuality in different cultures. Whitam told Newsweek, "If you look at all societies, homosexuality occurs at the same rates with the same kinds of behavior. That suggests something biological going on. The biological evidence has been growing for 20 or more years." He also studied trans women, reporting that in many cultures "these persons regard themselves as homosexuals and are regarded by more masculine homosexuals as a natural part of the homosexual world." Whitam's published books included The Protestant Spanish Community in New York in 1960 and Male Homosexuality in Four Societies: Brazil, Guatemala, the Philippines, and the United States, co-authored with Robin Mathy in 1986. Whitam died in Tempe, Arizona.

== Selected publications ==
- Whitam FL, Daskalos C, Sobolewski CG, Padilla P (1998). The emergence of lesbian sexuality and identity cross-culturally: Brazil, Peru, the Philippines, and the United States. Arch Sex Behav. 1998 Feb;27(1):31-56. PMID 9494688
- Whitam FL, Daskalos C, Mathy RM (1996). A cross-cultural assessment of familial factors in the development of female homosexuality. Journal of Psychology & Human Sexuality Volume 7, Issue 4, 1996 pages 59-76 doi 10.1300/J056v07n04_04
- Whitam FL, Diamond M, Martin J (1993). Homosexual orientation in twins: a report on 61 pairs and three triplet sets. Arch Sex Behav. 1993 Jun;22(3):187-206. PMID 8494487
- Whitam FL (1992). Bayot and Callboy: Homosexual-Heterosexual Relations in the Philippines'. In Murray SO (ed.) Oceanic Homosexualities. London, Garland Publishing, ISBN 978-0-8240-7227-8
- Whitam, FL (1991). From sociology: Homophobia and heterosexism in sociology. Journal of Gay & Lesbian Psychotherapy, 1(4), 31-44.
- Whitam FL, Mathy RM (1991). Childhood cross-gender behavior of homosexual females in Brazil, Peru, the Philippines, and the United States. Arch Sex Behav. 1991 Apr;20(2):151-70. PMID 2064540
- Ernulf KE, Innala SM, Whitam FL (1989). Biological explanation, psychological explanation, and tolerance of homosexuals: a cross-national analysis of beliefs and attitudes. Psychol Rep. 1989 Dec;65(3 Pt 1):1003-10. PMID 2608821
- Wolf WS, Weitz R, Whitam FL (1989). Sexual Knowledge, Attitudes and Behaviors: A Study of Gay and Bisexual Men in Maricopa County: Final Report.
- Whitam FL (1987). A cross-cultural perspective on homosexuality, transvestism, and trans-sexualism. In Wilson, Glenn Daniel (ed.) Variant sexuality: Research and theory, Johns Hopkins University Press, ISBN 978-0-8018-3464-6
- Whitam FL (1987). Os entendidos: Gay life in São Paulo. In Murray SO (ed.) Male Homosexuality in Central and South America. Instituto Obregon, ISBN 978-0-942777-58-1
- Whitam FL, Mathy RM (1986). Male homosexuality in four societies: Brazil, Guatemala, the Philippines, and the United States. Praeger Publishers, ISBN 978-0-03-004298-0
- Whitam FL, Zent M (1984). A cross-cultural assessment of early cross-gender behavior and familial factors in male homosexuality. Arch Sex Behav. 1984 Oct;13(5):427-39. PMID 6517684
- Whitam FL (1983). Culturally invariable properties of male homosexuality: tentative conclusions from cross-cultural research. Arch Sex Behav. 1983 Jun;12(3):207-26. PMID 6882205
- Whitam FL (1981). A reply to Goode on "The Homosexual Role." The Journal of Sex Research Vol. 17, No. 1, Feb., 1981
- Whitam FL (1980). The prehomosexual male child in three societies: the United States, Guatemala, Brazil. Arch Sex Behav. 1980 Apr;9(2):87-99. PMID 7396690
- Whitam FL (1980). Variant sexuality: Ellis, Freud, Hirschfeld, Kinsey. In Forleo R, Pasini W. (eds.) Medical sexology, Elsevier/North Holland Biomedical Press ISBN 0-444-80157-X
- Whitam FL (1979). Occupational choice and sexual orientation in cross-cultural perspective. International Review of Modern Sociology 9: 137-149
- Whitam FL (1979). The entendidos: middle class gay life in São Paulo. Gay Sunshine: A Journal of Gay Liberation 38-39: 16-17
- Whitam FL (1978). Rejoinder to Omark's comment on "The Homosexual Role." The Journal of Sex Research, 1978
- Whitam FL (1977). Childhood indicators of male homosexuality. Arch Sex Behav. 1977 Mar;6(2):89-96. PMID 849142
- Whitam FL (1977). The homosexual role: a reconsideration. The Journal of Sex Research. Vol. 13, No. 1, Feb., 1977
- Whitam FL (1968). Revivalism as institutionalized behavior: An analysis of the social base of a Billy Graham Crusade. Southwestern Social Science Quarterly, 1968
- Whitam FL (1965). Adolescence and Mass Persuasion: A Study of Teen-age Decision-Making at a Billy Graham Crusade. Doctoral dissertation.
- Whitam FL (1962). Subdimensions of religiosity and race prejudice. Review of Religious Research, Vol. 3, No. 4, Spring
- Whitam FL (1962). New York's Spanish Protestants. Christian Century, vol 99, 162–16 February 7, 1962
- Whitam FL (1957). Subdimensions of Religiosity as Related to Race Prejudice. MA thesis, Indiana University, 1957
