= Matteus =

Matteus or variation, may refer to:

== People ==
- Matteus (name), a Swedish name, the equivalent of "Matthew"
- Matteus (footballer), Matteus Oliveira Santos (born 1989), Brazilian soccer player
- Matteus Berglund (1898–1981), Swedish politician with the surname Berglund
- Matteus Ward (born 2001), Swedish ice hockey player during the 2020–21 HockeyAllsvenskan season
- Marko-Matteus Lange, Estonian record setting swimmer
- Arnold Matteus (1897–1986), Estonian architect

== Places ==
- Matteus Church (Swedish: Matthew), several churches in Sweden; see List of churches in Sweden
  - St Matteus kyrka (Swedish: St. Matthew's Church), Vasastaden, Stockholm, Sweden
- Matteus, Stockholm City Centre, Stockholm, Sweden; a region of Stockholm divided into two districts, Eastern and Western

== See also ==
- Mateus (disambiguation)
- Matthew (disambiguation)
