= Mattheus =

Mattheus is a masculine given name and surname, a Latin form of Matthew. Notable people with the name include:

== Given name ==
- Mattheus Borrekens (1615–1670), Flemish engraver
- Mattheus Pinna da Encarnaçao (1687–1764), Brazilian writer
- Mattheus de Haan (1663–1729), Dutch colonial governor
- Mattheus Le Maistre (c. 1505–1577), Flemish choirmaster
- Mattheus Lestevenon (1715–1797), Dutch ambassador
- Mattheus Oliveira (born 1994), Brazilian footballer
- Mattheus Pronk (1947–2001), Dutch cyclist
- Mattheus Marinus Schepman (1847–1919), Dutch malacologist
- Mattheus Smallegange (1624–1710), Dutch historian
- Mattheus Terwesten (1670–1757), Dutch painter
- Mattheus van Beveren (c. 1630–1696), Flemish sculptor
- Mattheus Ignatius van Bree (1773–1839), Belgian painter
- Mattheus van Helmont (1623–c. 1685), Flemish painter
- Mattheus Verheyden (1700–1776), Dutch painter
- Mattheus Wijtmans (1650–1689), Dutch painter

== Middle name ==
- Joam Mattheus Adami (1576-1633), Italian Jesuit missionary
- Jacobus Mattheüs de Kempenaer (1793-1870), Dutch politician

== Surname ==
- Charl Mattheus (born 1965), South African ultra marathon athlete
- Garrick Mattheus (born 1996), South African rugby union player
- Jan Mattheus (born 1965), Belgian cyclist
- Neels Mattheus (1935–2003), South African Afrikaner traditional musician
- Ryan Mattheus (born 1983), American baseball pitcher

== See also ==
- Matheus
- Matteus (disambiguation)
- St Matthew Passion
