= Mathy =

Mathy is a surname. Notable people with the surname include:

- François Mathy (born 1944), Belgian equestrian
- Karl Mathy (1807–1867), Badenian statesman
- Marianne Mathy (1890–1978), opera singer
- Reinhold Mathy (born 1962), German footballer
- Robin Mathy (born 1957), author, activist, and editor
