= Instant film =

Photographic film which develops in minutes

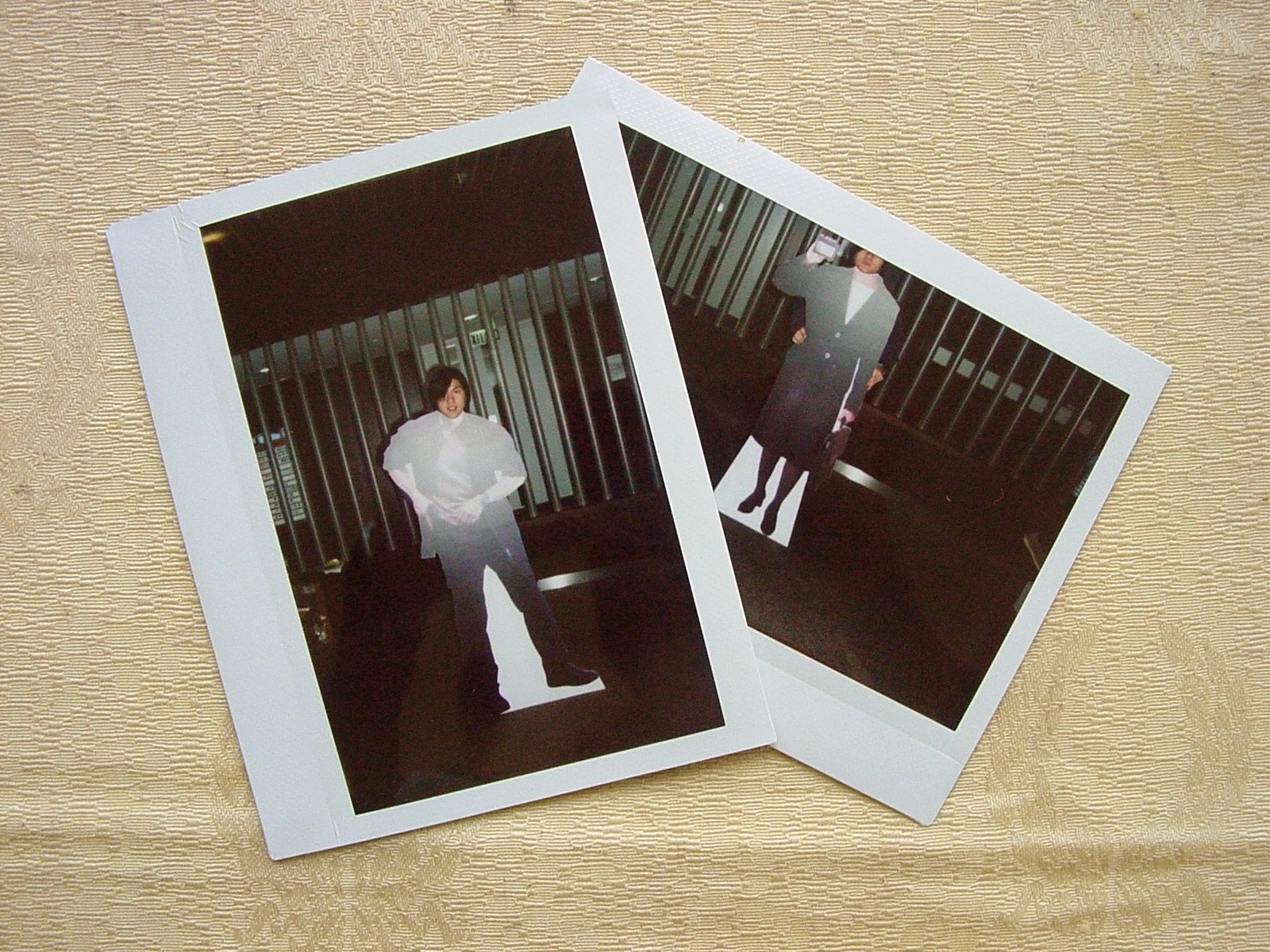
Photographs made using Instax film.

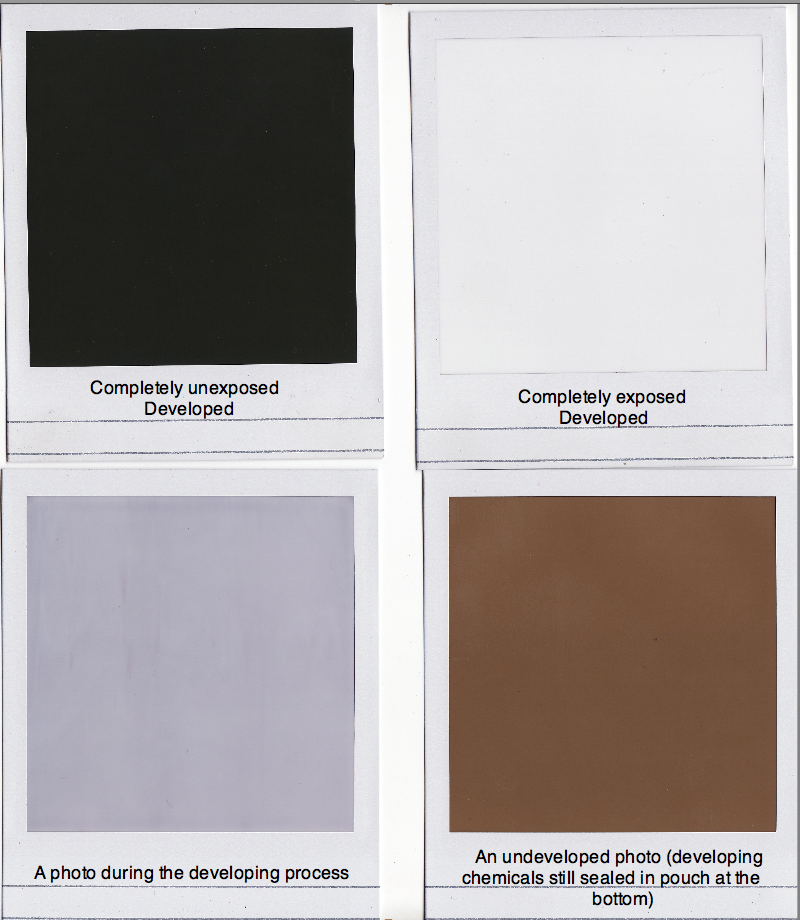
Upper left: Completely unexposed developed photo. Upper right: Completely exposed developed photo. Lower left: A photo as the opacifiers clear - the photo is already fully developed beneath. Lower right: An undeveloped photo, with chemicals still in the pouch at the bottom.

Instant film is a type of photographic film that was introduced by Polaroid Corporation to produce a visible image within minutes or seconds of the photograph's exposure. The film contains the chemicals needed for developing and fixing the photograph, and the camera exposes and initiates the developing process after a photo has been taken.

In earlier Polaroid instant cameras the film is pulled through rollers, breaking open a pod containing a reagent that is spread between the exposed negative and receiving positive sheet. This film sandwich develops for some time after which the positive sheet is peeled away from the negative to reveal the developed photo. In 1972, Polaroid introduced integral film, which incorporated timing and receiving layers to automatically develop and fix the photo without any intervention from the photographer.

Instant film has been available in sizes from 24 mm × 36 mm (0.94 in × 1.42 in) (similar to 135 film) up to 50.8 cm × 61 cm (20 in × 24 in) size, with the most popular film sizes for consumer snapshots being approximately 83 mm × 108 mm (3.3 in × 4.3 in) (the image itself is smaller as it is surrounded by a border). Early instant film was distributed on rolls, but later and current films are supplied in packs of 8 or 10 sheets, and single sheet films for use in large format cameras with a compatible back.

Though the quality of integral instant film is not as high as conventional film, peel apart black and white film (and to a lesser extent color film) approached the quality of traditional film types. Instant film was used where it was undesirable to have to wait for a roll of conventional film to be finished and processed, e.g., documenting evidence in law enforcement, in health care and scientific applications, and producing photographs for passports and other identity documents, or simply for snapshots to be seen immediately.

Some photographers use instant film for test shots, to see how a subject or setup looks before using conventional film for the final exposure. Instant film is also used by artists to achieve effects that are impossible to accomplish with traditional photography, by manipulating the emulsion during the developing process, or separating the image emulsion from the film base.

Instant film is notable for having had a wider range of film speeds available than other negative films of the same era, having been produced in ISO 40 to ISO 20,000 (Polaroid 612). Current instant film formats typically have an ISO between 100 and 1000.

Instant film has been supplanted for most purposes by digital photography, which allows the result to be viewed immediately on a display screen or printed with dye sublimation, inkjet, or laser home or professional printers.

Two companies currently manufacture instant film for Polaroid cameras: Polaroid (previously The Impossible Project) for older Polaroid cameras (600, SX-70, and 8×10) and its I-Type cameras, and Supersense that manufacture pack film for Polaroid cameras under the One Instant brand.

== How it works ==
Instant positive film (which produces a print) uses diffusion transfer to move the dyes from the negative to the positive via a reagent. The process varies according to the film type.

=== Roll/pack film ===
In 1947 Edwin H. Land introduced the Polaroid-Land process. The first instant films produced sepia tone photos. A negative sheet is exposed inside the camera, then lined up with a positive sheet and squeezed through a set of rollers which spread a reagent between the two layers, creating a developing film "sandwich". The negative develops quickly, after which some of the unexposed silver halide grains (and the latent image it contains) are solubilized by the reagent and transferred by diffusion from the negative to the positive. After a minute, depending on film type and ambient temperature, the negative is peeled away to reveal the picture which was transferred to the positive receiving sheet. True black and white films were released in 1950 after problems with chemistry stabilization were overcome.

The reagent was contained in a pod, which would be pressed and eventually broken by the rollers that would then spread the reagent across the film. The reagent contained a solvent for silver halide such as sodium thiosulfate, for example.

With that being said, photographers and enthusiasts still practice with this limited, special and discontinued film, with both older Polaroid stocks or Fujifilm FP-100C or FP-3000B varieties. Multiple companies made film backs that would adapt camera to use this film with a specific detachable back.

=== Subtractive color films ===
Color film is much more complex due to multiple layers of emulsion and dye. The negative consists of three emulsion layers sensitive to the primary colors (red, green, and blue) each with a layer of developing dye beneath it of the complementary color (cyan, magenta, and yellow). Once light exposed the negative, the reagent is spread between the negative and positive and the developing dye layer migrates though diffusion to the positive surface where it forms the photo. Emulsion layers exposed to their respective color block the complementary dye below it, reproducing the original color. For example, a photo of a blue sky would expose the blue emulsion, blocking all the yellow dye beneath it and allowing the magenta and cyan dye layers to migrate to the positive to form blue.

=== Integral film ===
This process is similar to subtractive color instant film with added timing and receiving layers. Land's solution was to incorporate an opacifier, which would darken when ejected from the camera, and then become clear to reveal the photograph. The film itself integrates all the layers to expose, develop, and fix the photo into a plastic envelope and frame commonly associated with a Polaroid photo.

There are two kinds of integral instant photographic film: one where the side that is exposed to light, is opposite to that used to view the photograph, developed by Kodak, and another where the same side is used for exposing the photograph and viewing it, developed by Polaroid for the SX-70 camera. Again to develop the film a pod with a reagent on one side of the film is broken and the contents are spread within the integral film.

For films that use the same side for light exposure and photograph viewing, the reagent had white pigment, opacifying dyes, potassium hydroxide, a thickener (which would be spread on top of the stack of from top to bottom), cyan dye developer, red-sensitive silver halide emulsion, an interlayer, magenta dye developer, green-sensitive silver halide emulsion, an interlayer, a yellow dye developer, a blue-sensitive silver halide emulsion, and an anti-abrasive layer. This stack would be on top of an opaque polyester back. Above the reagent would be an image-receiving mordant layer, a timing layer, an acid polymer and a clear polyester layer. The pigment would be white titania in a suspension, and the opacifying dyes would be opaque at high pH levels but mostly transparent at low pH levels. The developers would contain metals such as copper for cyan, and chromium for magenta and yellow. These would form metal-containing dyes, with better lightfastness. Eventually this type of film from Polaroid received a silver-ion catalyzed process for dye release for the magenta and yellow dye layers.

Instant films with different view and expose sides had, as seen from the view side, from the front towards the back of the film, in layers: A backing layer, a clear polyester layer, a mordant to receive the image in the film, a titanium white light reflecting layer, a carbon black opaque layer, a releaser for the cyan dye, an emulsion sensitive to red for film reversal and a nucleating agent, an oxidized developer scavenger, a releaser for the magenta dye, an emulsion sensitive to green for film reversal and a nucleating agent, another oxidized developer scavenger, a releaser for the yellow dye, an with emulsion sensitive to blue for film reversal and a nucleating agent, a UV absorbing topcoat, a mixture of processing reagents such as potassium hydroxide, a film developer, carbon, a thickener, antifoggant and sulfite, two timing layers, an acid polymer, a clear polyester layer and a backing layer facing the expose side of the film.

The reagent is highly alkaline and when spread across the stack, it solubilizes or dissolves and moves the chemicals in the stack, which starts the photographic developing process. The silver halide that is exposed to light undergoes redox reactions with developer, and leaves free, undeveloped silver halide with silver ions that can modify image-forming dyes. The solubility and thus diffusivity of the dyes changes locally according to the local levels of these silver ions and in turn controls the amounts of dye that can diffuse to the image-receiving layer, and in which places.

The dyes then diffuse through the stack and the reagent, driven by electrostatic and chemical gradients, and deposit into the image-receiving layer. The reagent is what allows the dyes to move up the stack via diffusion. Dye release frees dye molecules to move up the stack via diffusion into the image-receiving layer.

=== Additive color film ===
Additive film (such as Polavision and Polachrome slide film) uses a color mask of microscopically thin transparent red, green, and blue lines (3000 lines per inch) and a black and white emulsion layer to reproduce color images in transparency film. The resulting dye developers (unexposed emulsion) block the colors not needed and project the color or combination of colors which form in the resulting image. Since the lines are so close to each other, the human eye easily blended the primary colors together to form the correct color, much like an LCD or television. For instance, a photo of a yellow flower would expose the emulsion beneath the red and green masks and not the blue mask. The developing process removed the exposed emulsion (under the red and green masks) and diffused the unexposed dye developer (under the blue mask) to its receiving layer, blocking light from coming through. This resulted in the projected light shining through the red and green masks but not the blue mask, creating the color yellow. Because of the film density, film speeds were necessarily slow. High precision was required for the production of this film.

== Film brands ==
=== Polaroid ===
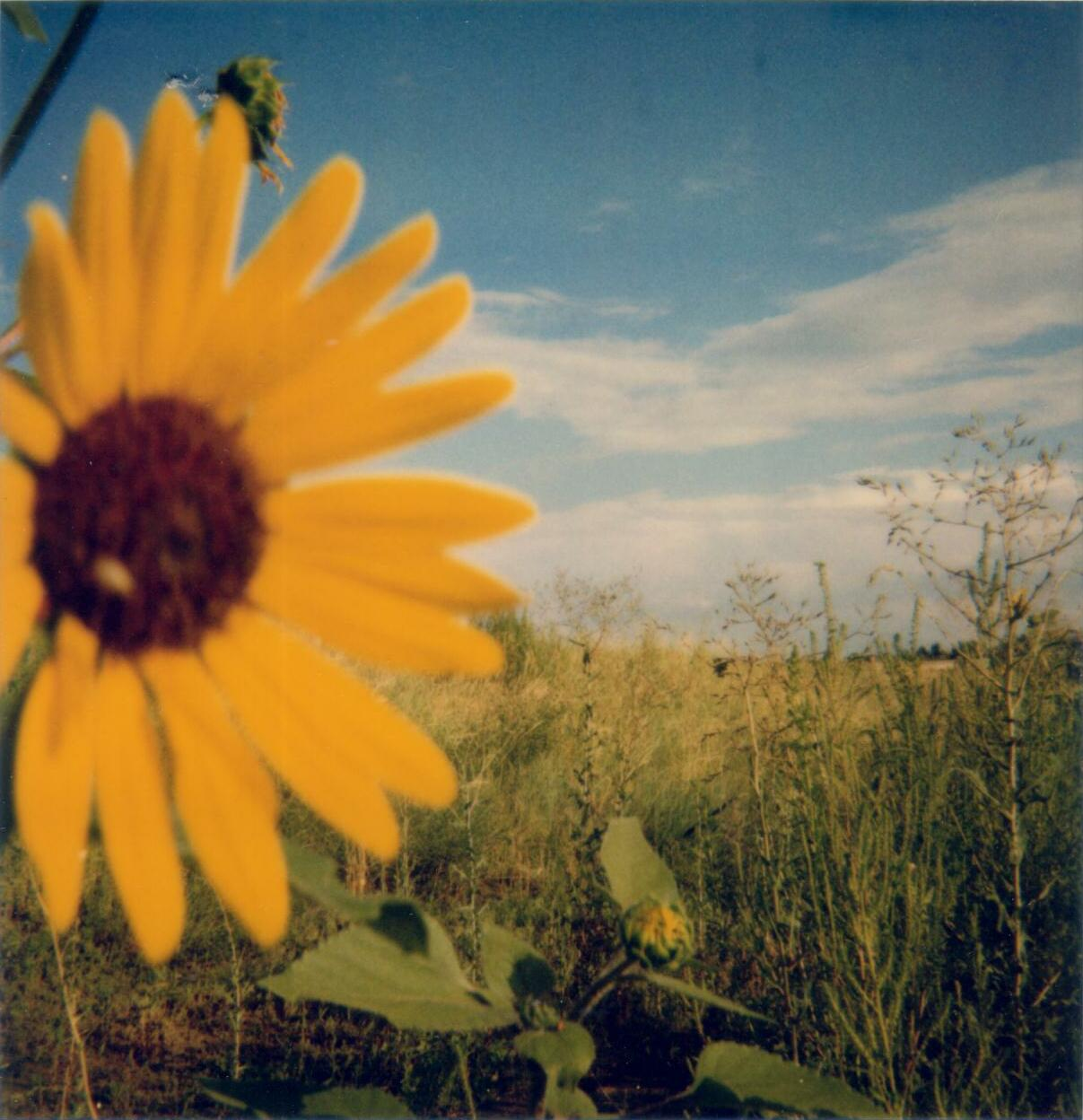
A sample shot of Polaroid Type 600, ISO 640, color film

Polaroid Corporation invented and produced the widest range of instant film. Roll film was distributed in two separate negative and positive rolls and developed inside the camera. It was introduced in 1948 and was manufactured until 1992. Sheet film was introduced in 1958 for 4x5" film holder #500. Each sheet contains a reagent pod, negative and receiving positive, and was loaded separately and developed outside the film holder. In 1973 Polaroid introduced 8x10" Instant film. Pack film was distributed in a film pack which contained both negative and positive sheets and was developed outside the camera. It was introduced in 1963. Integral film is also distributed in a film pack, but each film envelope contains all the chemical layers to expose, develop, and fix the photo. It was introduced in 1972.

Polavision was an instant motion picture film. Polavision was introduced by Polaroid in 1978, with an image format similar to Super 8 mm film, and based on an additive color process. Polavision required a specific camera and tabletop viewer, and was not a commercial success, but did lead to the development of an instant 35 mm color slide film. Polachrome was an easy to develop 35 mm film, available in color, monochrome and 'blue' formats (the latter intended for making title cards). Each roll of film came with a cartridge containing developing chemicals which were pressed between the film and a developing strip by a hand-cranked machine called the AutoProcessor. The AutoProcessor was very cheap and did not require a darkroom; the results were somewhat variable, the resolution was not as good as conventional film due to the matrix of tiny red, green and blue filters required to make the monochrome emulsion work in color, and the sensitivity was low, even for slide film; in tungsten light, Polachrome CS is rated at ISO 40. It was introduced in 1983.

Polaroid integral film packs usually contain a flat "Polapulse" electrical battery, which powers systems in the camera, including exposure and focusing mechanisms, electronic flash, and a film ejection motor. The inclusion of the battery within the film pack ensures that a fresh battery is available with each new pack of film.

==== Preservation ====
Polaroids have the same storage standards under ISO 18920:2000 as any other photograph. Regular storage conditions should be less than 70 degrees Fahrenheit (21 degrees Celsius) and between 50% and 30% relative humidity (RH). Cold storage (0 degrees Fahrenheit / -17 degrees Celsius optimum) is not helpful unless RH can be controlled and cold storage RH is generally drier than required. RH below 30% will create an environment that is too dry and may cause the photograph to curl. A Polaroid transfer removes the emulsion from the plastic backing and residual chemicals, offering an alternate form of preservation.

==== End of and resumption of production ====
In February 2008, Polaroid (by then under the control of Thomas J. Petters of Petters Group Worldwide) announced it would stop production of all instant film. The company shut down three factories and laid off 450 workers. In 2017, the Impossible Project acquired the rights to Polaroid's formats and trademarks, and, renaming itself Polaroid B.V., resumed production of Polaroid film.

==== Integral film ====
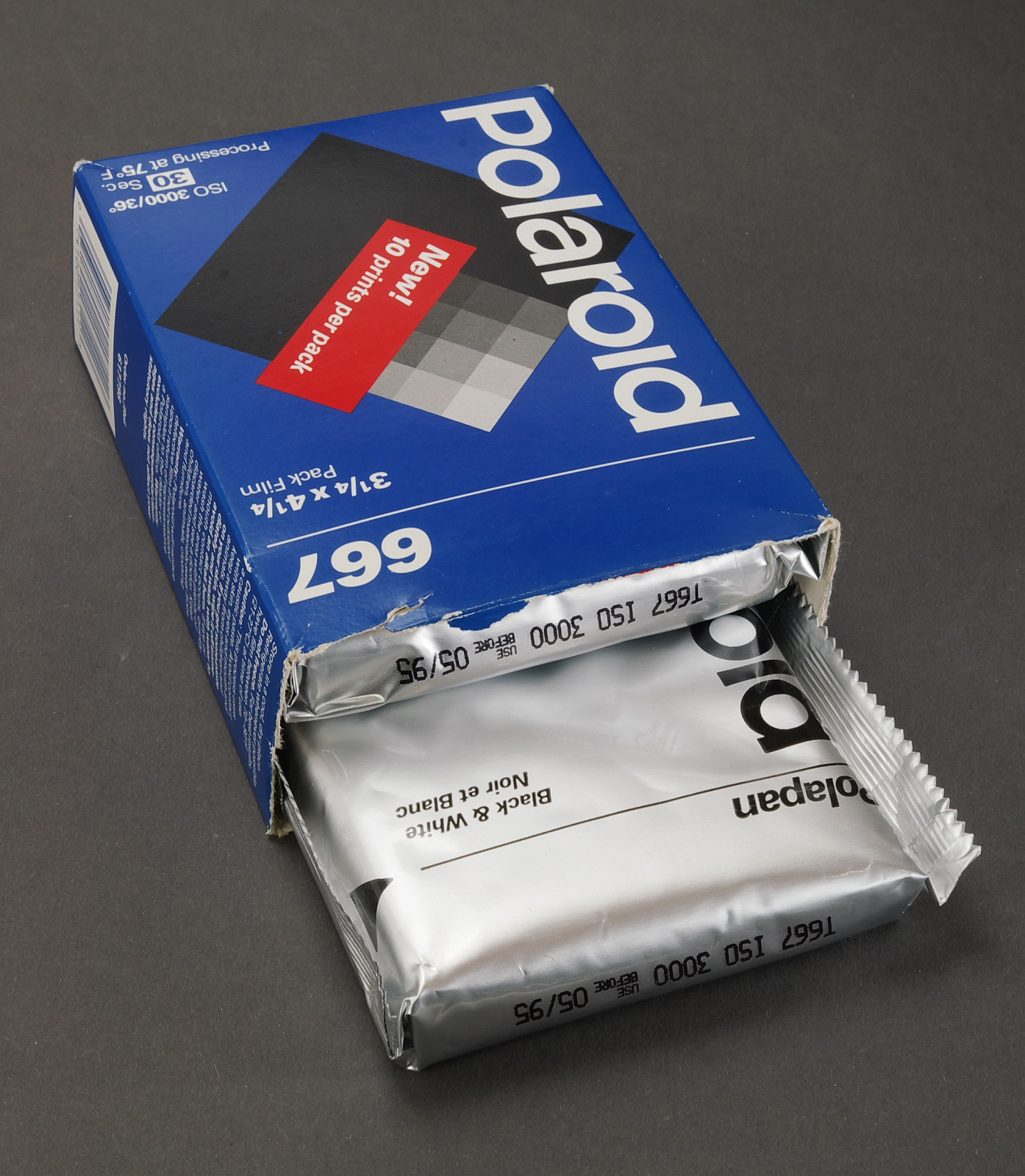
Polaroid Type 667 ISO 3000

- SX-70 cameras (integral film, develops automatically, 3.1 in × 3.1 in, 79 mm × 79 mm)
- 600 cameras (integral film, develops automatically, 3.1 in × 3.1 in, 79 mm × 79 mm)
- Spectra / Image / 1200 cameras (integral film, develops automatically, 3.6 in × 2.9 in, 91 mm × 74 mm)
- Captiva/Vision (integral film, for Captiva and Joycam, 4.4 in × 2.5 in, 112 mm × 64 mm)
- i-Zone (integral film, for i-Zone, Tomy Xiao, 1.5 in × 1 in, 38 mm × 25 mm)
- i-Zone200 (integral film, for i-Zone200 only, 1.5 in × 1 in, 38 mm × 25 mm)
- Type 330 series AutoFilm (integral film for use Polaroid CB-33 backs, 3.25 in × 4.25 in, 83 mm × 108 mm).
- Go (integral film, for Go cameras, develops automatically, 2.623 in × 2.122 in; 66.6 mm × 53.9 mm)

==== Packfilm ====
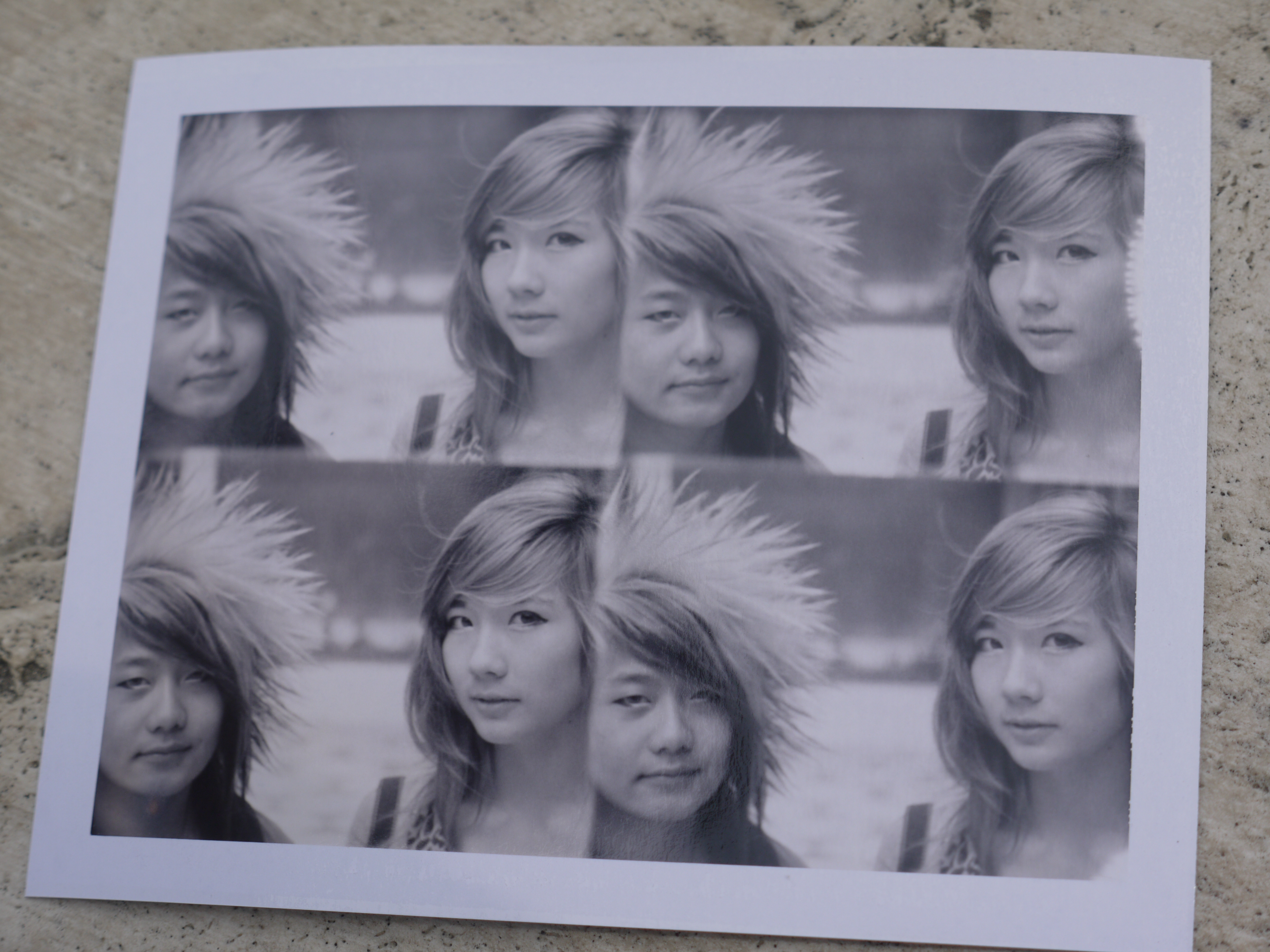
A photograph on Type 100 film taken with a Polaroid Miniportrait

- Type 100 series packfilm for Land cameras (timed peel-apart development, sometimes called type 660, 4.25 in × 3.25 in; 108 mm × 83 mm). Fuji discontinued making 100 series packfilm in 2016.
- Type 550 series packfilm, 4 in × 5 in (100 mm × 130 mm), for Polaroid 550 film backs. Introduced in 1981.
- Type 80 series packfilm, 3 1/4 in × 3 3/8 in (83 mm × 86 mm). Introduced in 1971; re-introduced in 2003.

==== Rollfilm ====
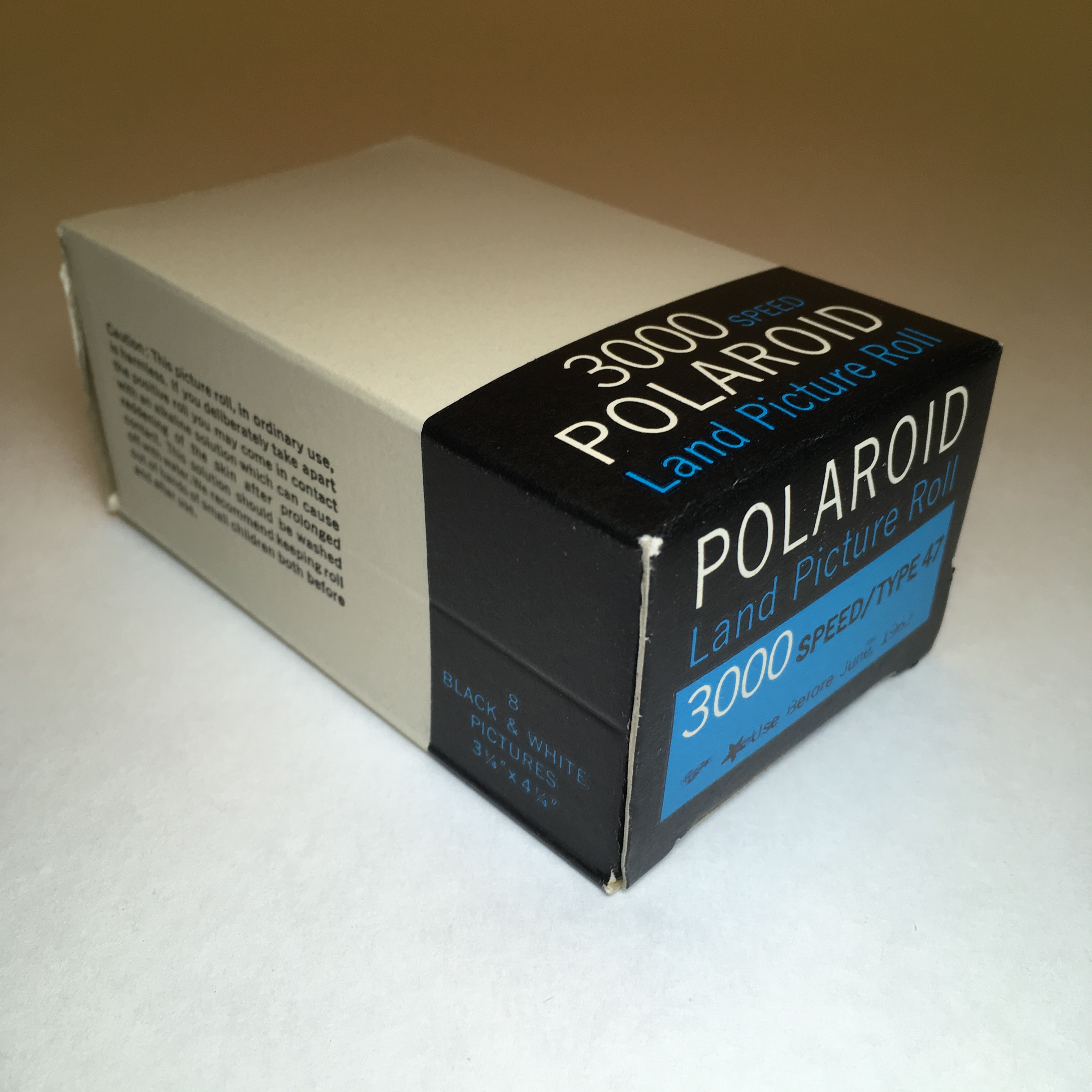
Polaroid Type 47 Land Roll Film ISO 3000, expired June 1962

- Type 20 series roll film, for "The Swinger" (2 1/2 in × 3 1/4 in, 64 mm × 83 mm). Introduced 1965, discontinued 1979.
- Type 30 series roll film, for "Highlander" (80, 80A, 80B) and J33 Electric Eye (2 1/2 in × 3 1/4 in, 64 mm × 83 mm). Introduced 1954, discontinued 1979.
- Type 40 series roll film (3 1/4 in × 4 1/4 in, 83 mm × 108 mm) 8 exposures per roll (for monochrome types, 6 exposures for type 48 Polacolor), for most Polaroid cameras made before 1963. Introduced 1948, discontinued 1976 (Polacolor) and 1992 (monochrome).

==== Sheet film ====
- Type 50 series sheetfilm for 4 in × 5 in (100 mm × 130 mm) large format (time peel-apart development, all professional grade)
- Type 800 series sheetfilm for 8 in × 10 in (200 mm × 250 mm) cameras, processors, Daylabs and other purposes.

==== PolaChrome ====
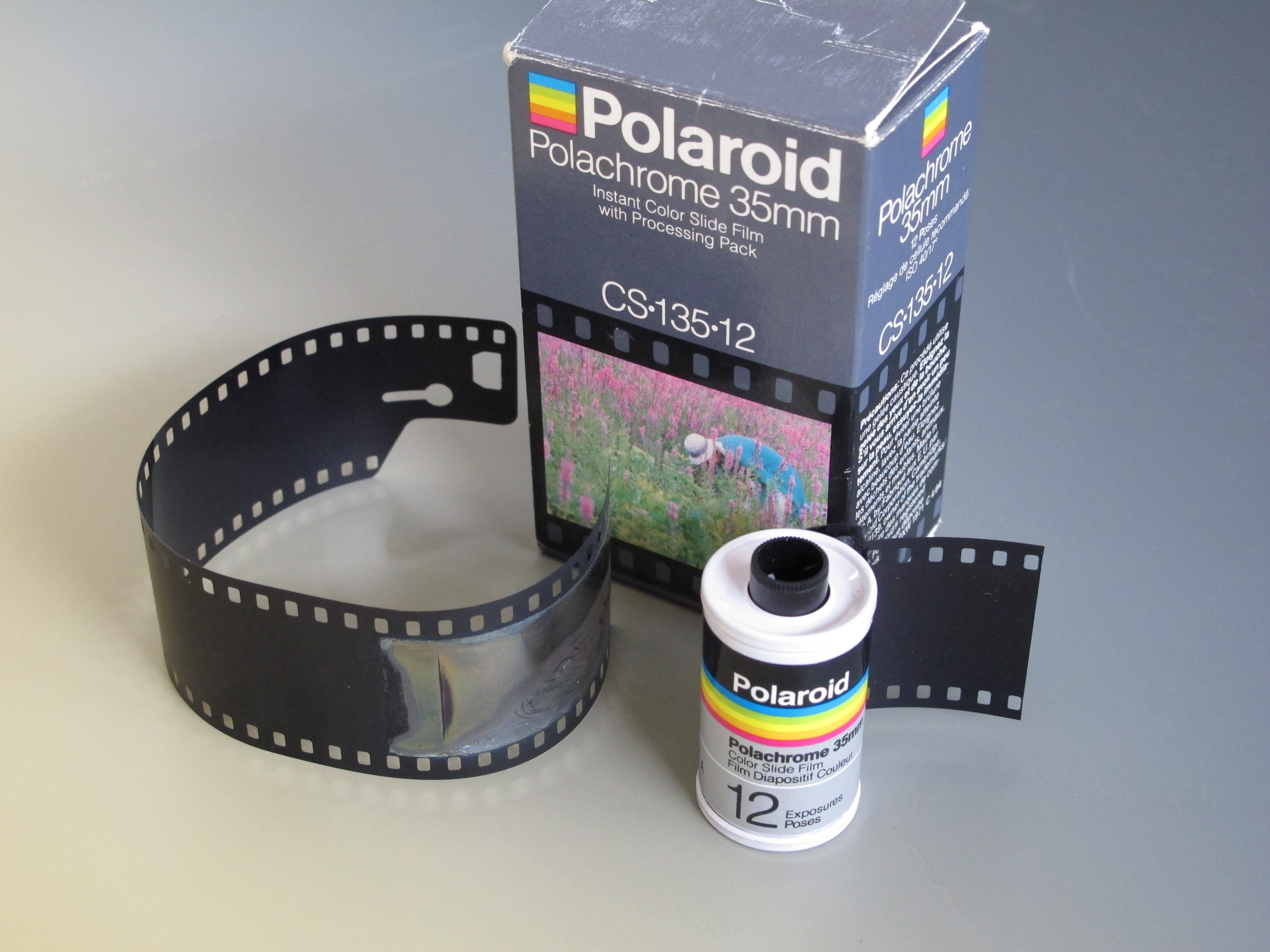
Polachrome instant slide film

PolaBlue, PolaChrome CS, PolaChrome HCP, PolaGraph HC, and PolaPan CT were 35 mm instant slide films.

==== 20x24 ====
20x24 P3 PolaColor, 20x24 P7 PolaColor, and 20x24 PolaPan.

==== 40x80 ====
- 40x80 PolaColor ER, ISO 80, color

==== Misc film ====
- Polaroid IJT-100 transparency film, Type 1001 radiography film, and Type 3000X radiography film.

=== Kodak ===
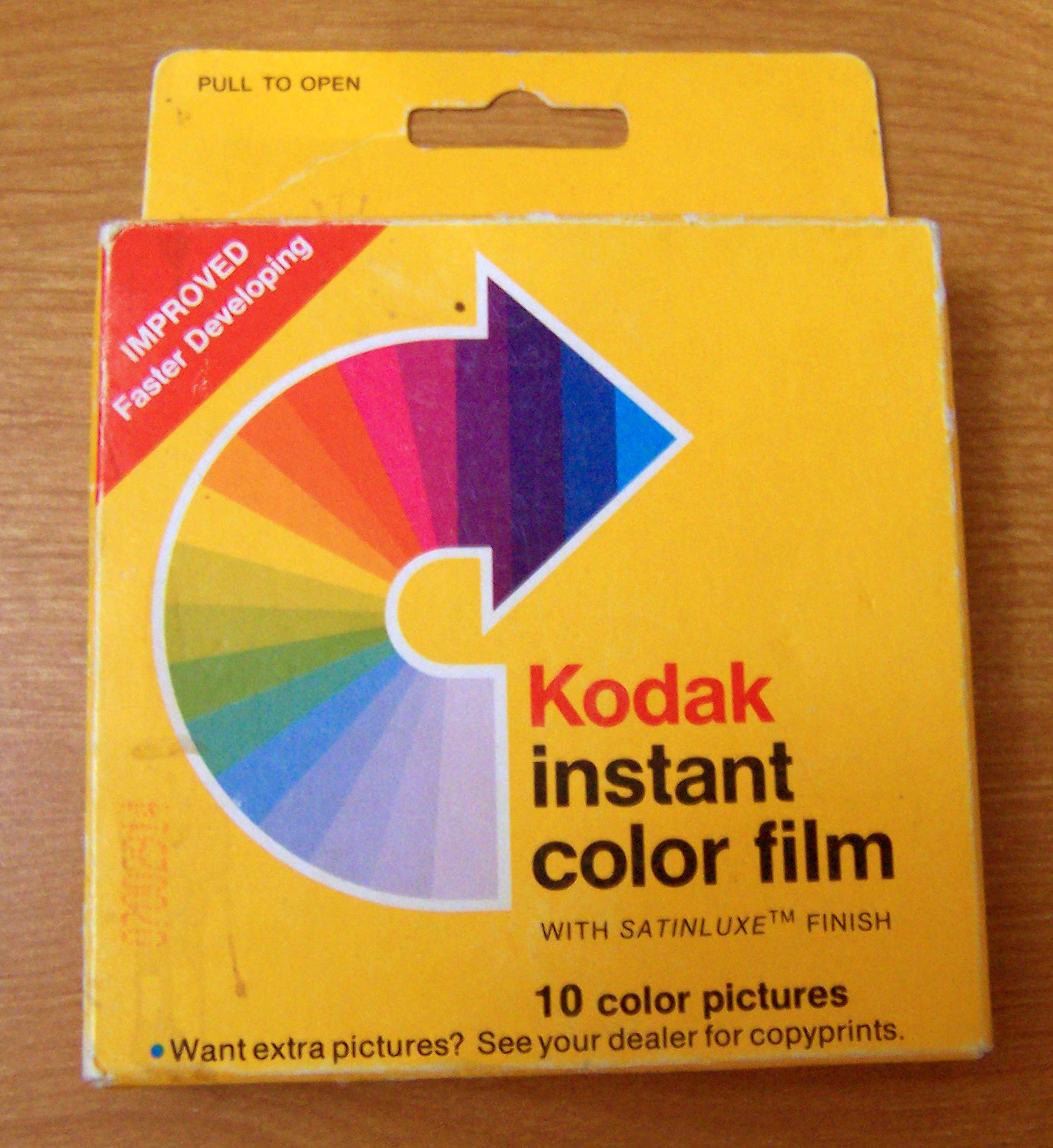
A pack of Kodak PR-10 Satinluxe instant film.

Kodak manufactured the negative component of Polaroid's instant film from 1963 to 1969, when Polaroid decided to manufacture its own. Kodak's original plan was to create packfilm type instant products. There were many prototypes and test runs of the film with many private demonstrations to their board. Plans changed when Polaroid in 1972 released the integral type film with the introduction of the SX-70 system. Kodak decided to scrap the plans for packfilm release and focus on an integral type process. A few years later Kodak introduced its own instant film products in 1976, which was different from Polaroid's in several ways:

Kodak instant film was exposed from the back without a mirror, the opposite of Polaroid's film which was exposed from the front with a mirror to reverse the image. Kodak used a matte finish on the front, made possible by exposing the film through the back. The negative and empty pod could be removed by peeling it off of the back of the print. Unlike Polaroid's integral film packs, Kodak's did not contain a battery, and used conventional batteries. Kodak's PR 10 film was found to have light fading stability issues.

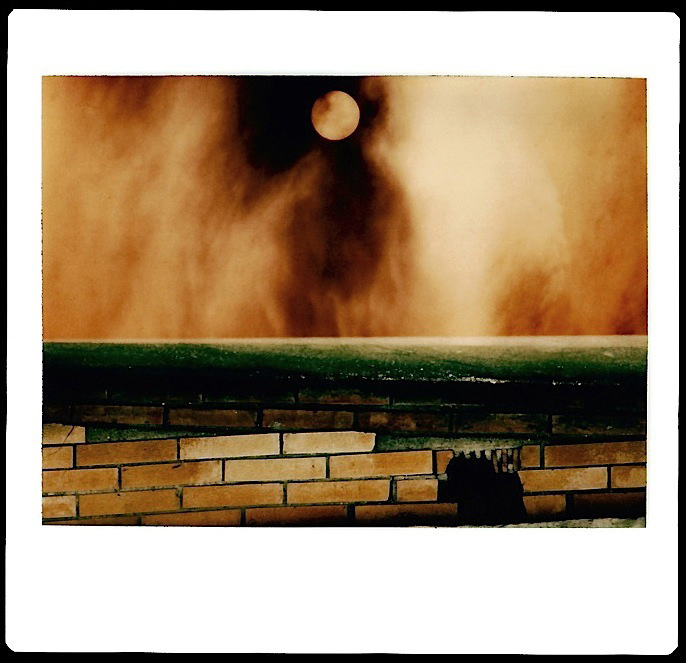
Kodak instant by Augusto De Luca, 1980

Polaroid filed suit against Eastman Kodak in April 1976 for the infringement of ten patents held by Edwin Land and others on his development team relating to instant photography. In September 1985, the United States District Court of Massachusetts ruled that seven patents were valid and infringed, two were invalid but infringed, and one was valid but not infringed by Kodak. Kodak appealed but was denied and an injunction prohibiting production of their instant film and cameras was put into effect. Kodak's appeal to the Supreme Court was denied a few months later, and in January 1986, Kodak announced it would no longer be producing their instant line of products. In 1991, Polaroid was awarded $925 million in damages from Kodak.

One of the few photographers who used Kodak Instant films for photographic research in the 80s was the Italian Augusto De Luca.

==== Alternative Kodak instant film ====
While Kodak instant films have been discontinued, Fuji's instant film available in Japan since the 1980s is very similar to Kodak's. The pictures are the same size, the cartridge is almost the same, with some easy plastic modifications; the Fuji Fotorama series film can be made to fit. It was closest to the Kodak with the ISO at 160, many of the camera's brightness controls can be adjusted to work with the different ISO; However, the FI-10 series was discontinued in 2004. The faster ISO 800 instant films will work as well but would require the use of a filter either on the film cartridge or lens.

=== Fujifilm ===
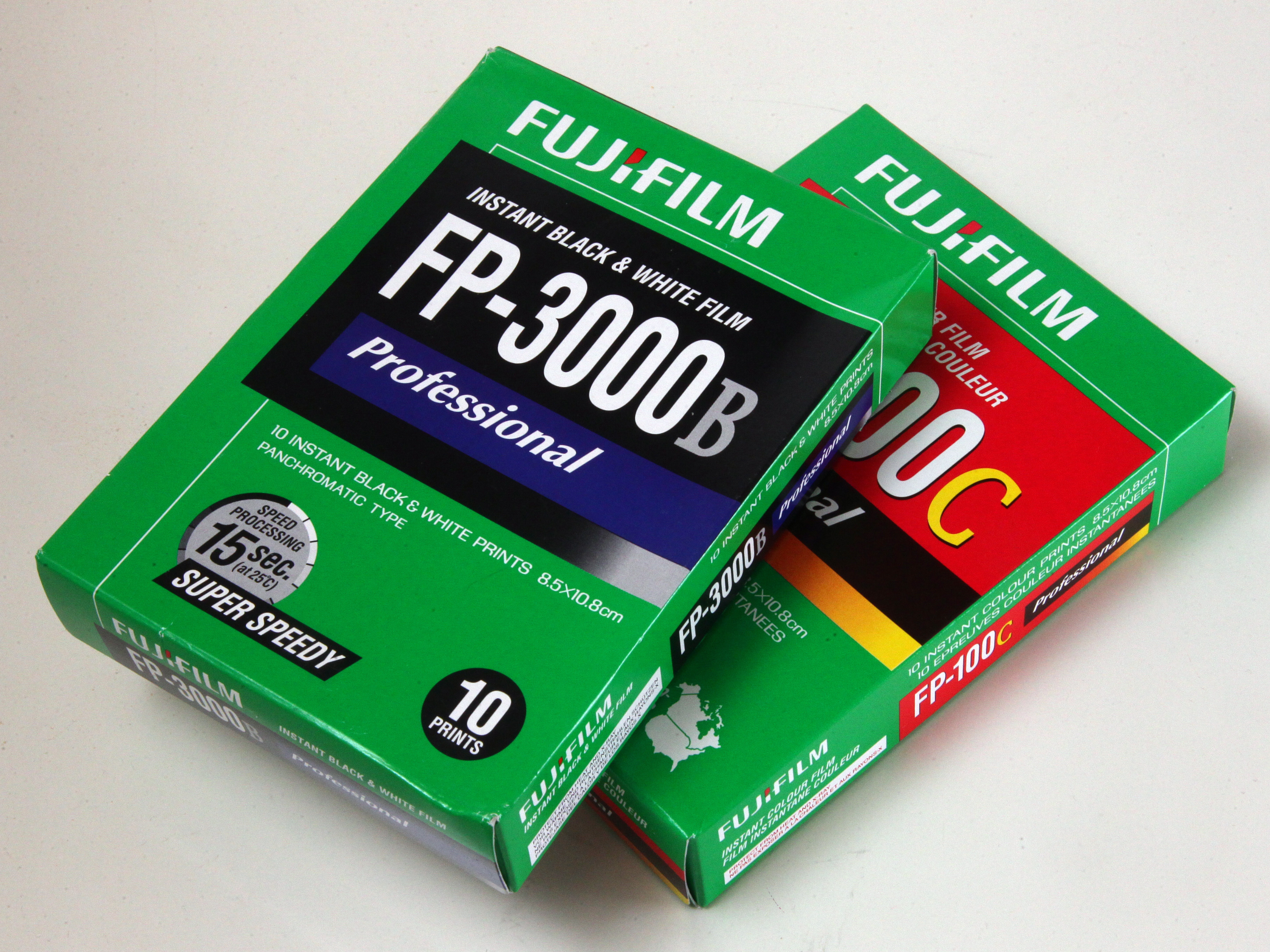
Fujifilm equivalents of Polaroid films

In Japan, Fujifilm introduced their own line of instant photographic products in 1981 starting with the Fotorama line of cameras. The name Fotorama came from photograph and panorama, as the film was a wide format compared to the square Polaroid SX-70/600 films. These Integral films developed similar to Kodak's with the back layer first. This presented a major problem for Fujifilm because of the ongoing litigation between Kodak and Polaroid. Polaroid also has a separate suit with Fujifilm and their instant film patents in Japan. When Kodak lost, Fujifilm was able to work with Polaroid to allow their cameras and films to remain in the market, provided that they have a technology sharing agreement. Polaroid was interested in branching out to magnetic media in the boom of the videotape era and had acquired a company called MagMedia Ltd. Fujifilm had a history in magnetic media dating to the mid-1950s. This led to Polaroid having access to Fujifilm's electronic, video tape and floppy disc magnetic products. This allowed Fujifilm access to Polaroid's film technology.

By the mid-1980s Fujifilm introduced the higher ISO System 800 series, followed by the ACE series in the mid-1990s. Instant ACE is nearly identical to System 800, the only difference is the design of the plastic cartridge in the ACE do not contain the spring mechanism (the spring is in the camera). Most of these products were available only in the Japanese market, until the release of Instax series of cameras in 1998. Fujifilm originally wanted to release the Instax series worldwide including North America and Europe simultaneously, but decided to work with Polaroid on the mio camera based on the Instax mini 10 for the US market; while Canada did get the Instax Wide 100. Another product was Fujifilm's Digital Instax Pivi film for their battery powered portable printer which was made available for those who wanted to print from their mobile phone via infrared, USB and Bluetooth.

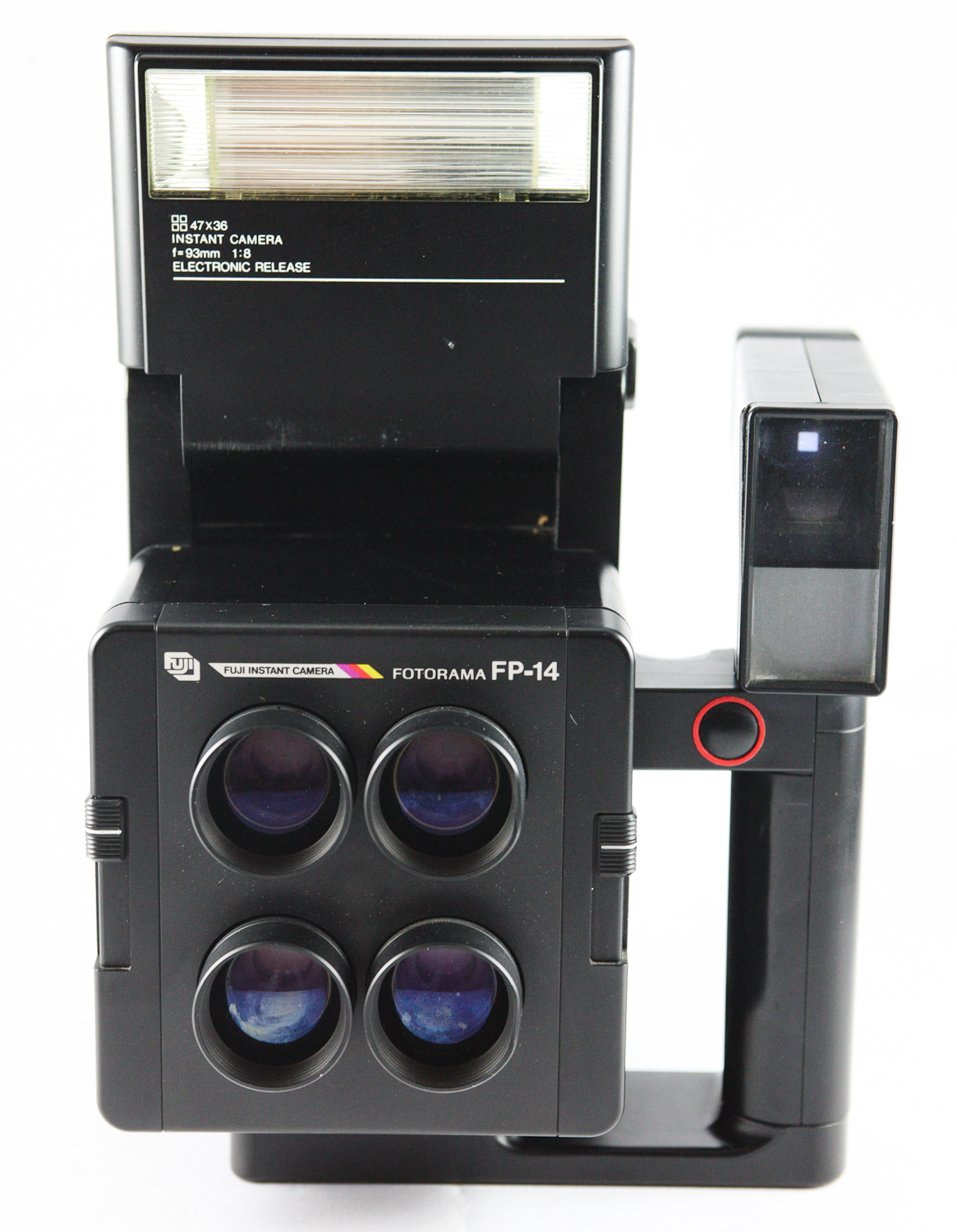
A Fuji FP-14, designed for use as a passport camera

Fujifilm makes pack film for their passport camera systems, and had been available outside Japan since the mid-1980s. No legal issues arose with Fuji's peel apart instant films as Polaroid's patents had expired. While very popular in Australia as a cheaper alternative to Polaroid, it was generally not too well known elsewhere due to Polaroid's dominance in most countries. In 2000, Fuji decided to change the way they manufacture pack film, making the entire pack out of plastic instead of a metal and plastic combination. Fujifilm announced at PMA 2003 that pack film would be made available to the North American market.

With the discontinuation of Polaroid instant film in 2008, Fuji started to export more of their instant film products to overseas markets, starting with making an increased variety of pack films available. In November 2008 the Instax Wide format was available in the US with the Instax 200 camera. Instax mini series of cameras and films became available in the US during the second half of 2009, with the mini 7s, also an updated Instax 210 replaced the Instax 200. Fujifilm's FP-100b45 was announced in Sept of 2009 for the US market. The FP-3000b45 arrived in the North American market in Jan 2011, after Fujifilm Japan stopped manufacturing FP-100b, but was discontinued in 2012. In late 2012 Fujifilm discontinued FP-3000B, followed by the discontinuation of FP-100C in spring 2016. In April 2017 Fujifilm announced the Instax SQUARE 1:1 format and compatible Instax SQ10 camera.

Fujifilm instant films include:

==== Integral film ====
Image areas of Fujifilm instax mini against Polaroid/Impossible Type 600

- Instax Wide series ISO 800 films
- Instax Mini series ISO 800 films
- Instax Square series ISO 800 films
- ACE series ISO 800 films. Compatible with Fujifilm's Fotorama ACE series of instant cameras. Discontinued June 2010.
- 800 series ISO 800 films. Compatible with Fujifilm's Fotorama 800 series instant cameras. Discontinued 2010.
- F Series ISO 160. Compatible with Fotorama F series instant cameras. Discontinued in the mid-1990s.
- Miscellaneous discontinued films; FI-160 ISO 160 (89x114 mm) for use with MS-45 4x5 instant back.

==== Packfilm ====
- 3 1/4 in × 4 1/4 in (83 mm × 108 mm). Compatible with Polaroid Type 100 packfilm (also known as "Type 660"). Discontinued February 2016.
- 4 in × 5 in (100 mm × 130 mm). For use in the Fujifilm PA-45 holder. Compatible with Polaroid Type 550 series 4x5 packfilm versions of Type 50 sheetfilm. Discontinued 2016.

==== Modification and Adaption ====
Since the stop of production of the packfilm, most photographers are using the existing stock available on the market. With analog photography being an increasing interest to more people, people have been adapting older cameras like the Polaroid Land cameras 110A, 110B or 120, as these cameras have manual control, allowing photographers to have complete exposure control. Instant option is an online shop that is dedicated to sure modification service as well as other polaroid or instant film camera related modifications. There are also a lot of interest in having this as a personal project, as to make a functional camera does not require an extreme amount of work; articles from The phoblographer.com shows the process of doing such modifications.

=== The Impossible Project / Polaroid Originals ===
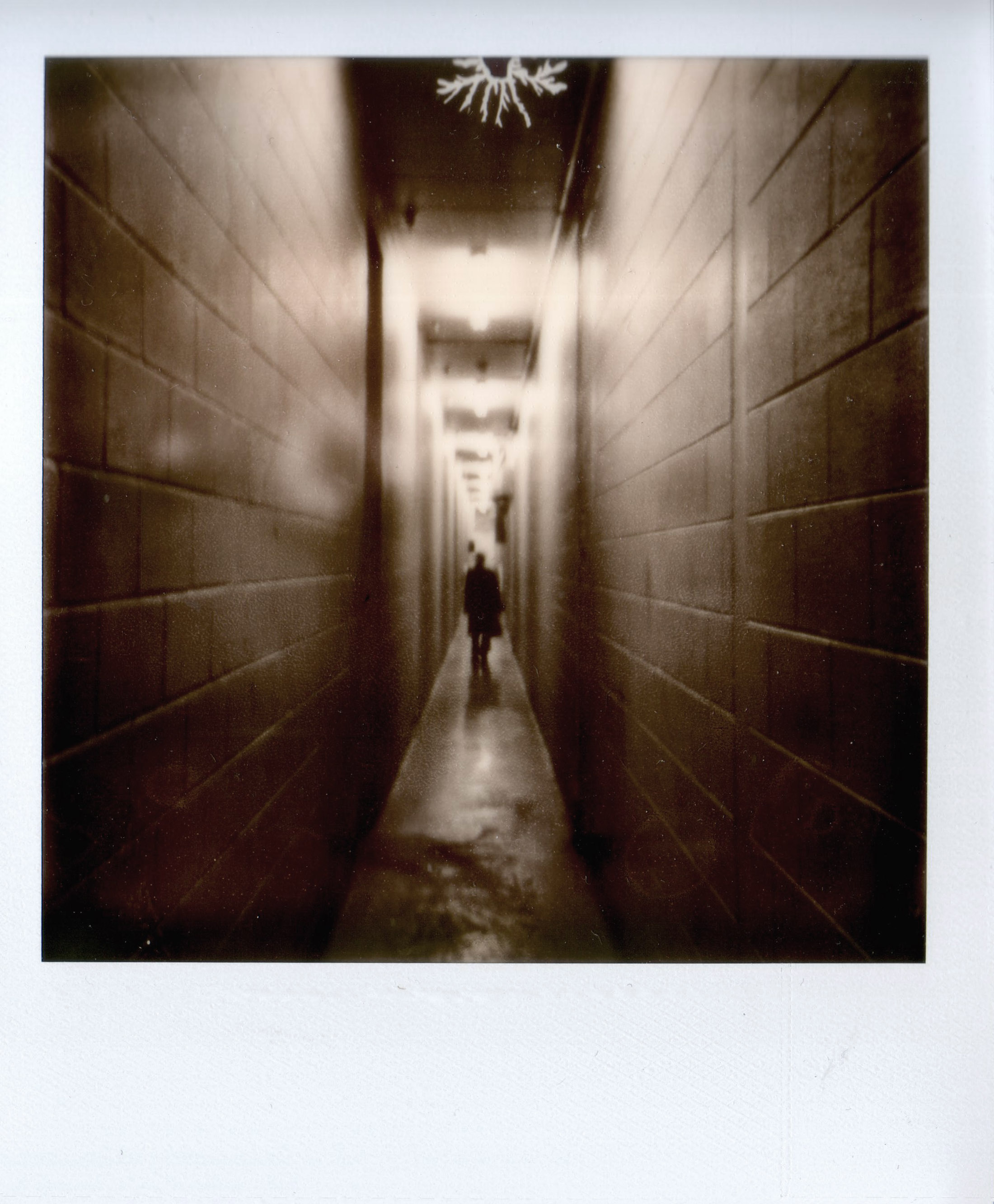
Shot on Impossible Project PX600 Silver Shade UV+ film

A group called the Impossible Project acquired Polaroid's old equipment and factory in Enschede, in the Netherlands. On their website they stated:

We aim to re-start production of analog instant film for vintage Polaroid cameras in 2010.

and

"The Impossible mission is not to re-build Polaroid Integral film but (with the help of strategic partners) to develop a new product with new characteristics, consisting of new optimised components, produced with a streamlined modern setup. An innovative and fresh analog material, sold under a new brand name that perfectly will match the global re-positioning of Integral Films."

On March 22, 2010, it was announced they were successful in manufacturing instant film compatible with Polaroid SX-70/600 instant cameras. Two new products were announced — PX100 and PX600. Their PX100 Silver Shade instant film is a manipulable, monochromatic replacement of old Polaroid brand instant film compatible with SX-70 cameras while the PX600 Silver Shade instant film is compatible with 600 cameras. That formulation has since been supplanted by improved films.

Washington Square Park, shot on modern Polaroid 600 film

The company, renamed Polaroid Originals in 2017, produces 600, SX-70, Spectra and 8×10 color and monochrome film packs with a variety of colored borders. It also produces I-Type film packs that differ from traditional 600 packs in their omission of the battery (thus lowering costs), for use in its Impossible I-1 camera (released in 2016), its Polaroid OneStep 2 camera (released in September 2017), and its Polaroid OneStep+ (released in September 2018).

=== PLR IP Holdings, LLC ===
Summit Global Group, using the Polaroid brand, produced an instant photography camera and film starting with the Polaroid PIC 300, based on Fujifilm's Instax Mini 7.

- 300, ISO 800, color (a rebranded Fujifilm Instax Mini 7)

=== New55 FILM ===
A company called New55 Holdings, LLC, ("New55 FILM") based in Ashland, Massachusetts, brought to market a black and white 4x5 positive-negative material that is exposed and processed in a Polaroid 545 holder. New55 PN provided a positive print and a 4x5 negative that could be scanned, contact printed, or enlarged. Winding up their proof-of-principle R&D phase, New55 Holdings, LLC, ceased operations in December 2017, but under a new structure restarted production of New55 100 and 400 speed instant 4X5 film sold through Famous-Format's online store .

== Toxicity ==
The liquid chemicals for the developing process contained in the more common instant photo sheets are caustic and can cause chemical burns. If these chemicals come into contact with skin, they should be washed off immediately.

== See also ==
- Film format
- Polaroid type 55
- Instant camera
