= Siege of Groenlo (1627) =

1627 siege

- Part of the Eighty Years' War and the Anglo–Spanish War
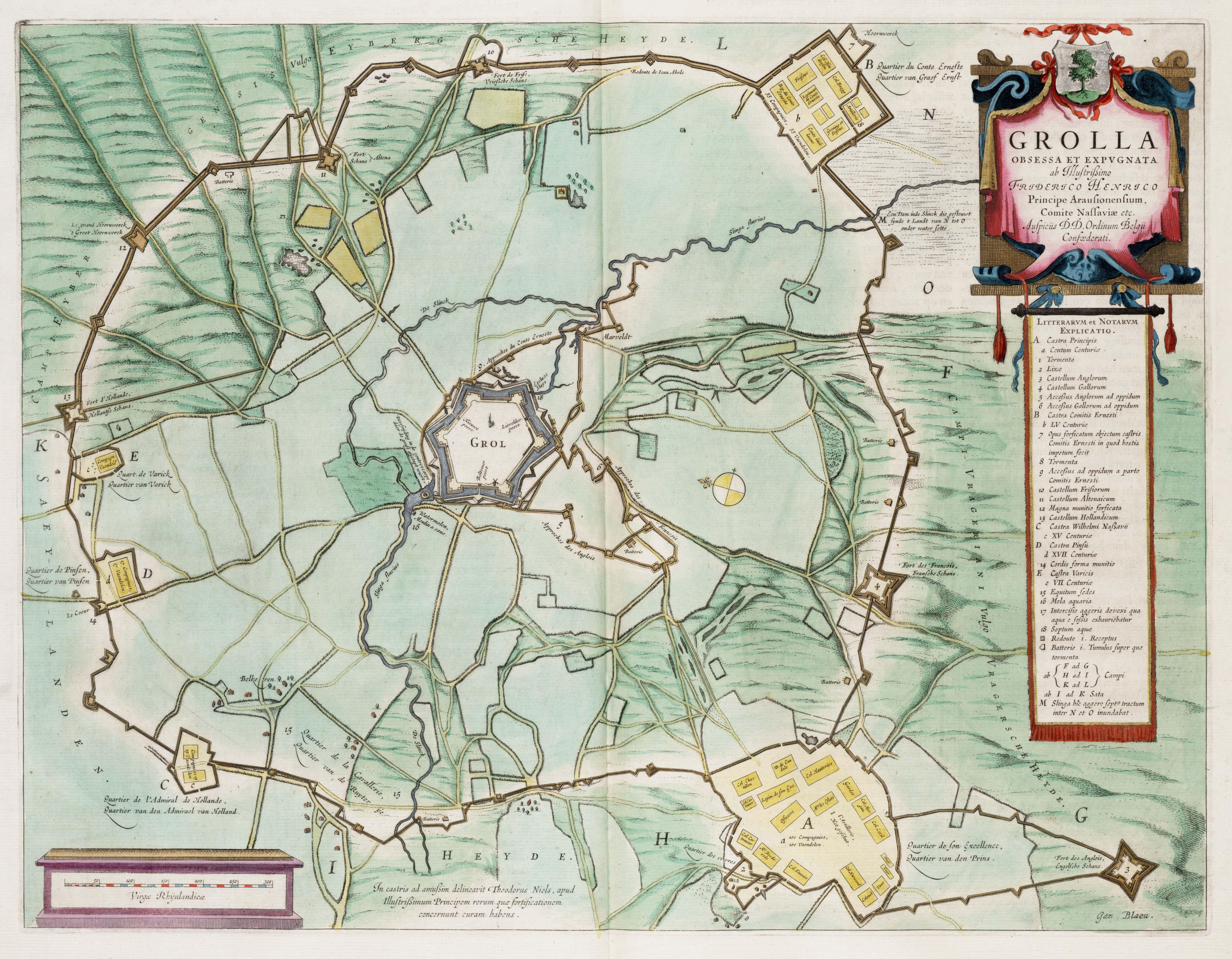
- Siege of Groenlo in 1627 by Frederick Henry, including the circumvallation. Map J.Blaeu.
Date	20 July – 19 August 1627
Location	Groenlo, Gelderland (present-day Netherlands) 52°3′N 6°37′E
Result	Anglo-Dutch victory

Belligerents
Dutch Republic; England	Spain

Commanders and leaders
(Dutch Republic) Frederick Henry (Dutch Republic) Ernst Casamir (England) Edward Cecil	(Spain) Matthijs Dulken (WIA) (Grol) (Spain) Hendrik van den Bergh (Spanish Army)

Strength
16,000 infantry 4,000 cavalry	1,200 infantry (Grol); 100 cavalry (Grol); 16,000 infantry (Spanish Army); 5,000 cavalry (Spanish Army)

Casualties and losses
Unknown	Unknown

The siege of Grol in 1627 was a battle between the Army of the Dutch Republic, commanded by Frederick Henry, Prince of Orange, and the Spanish-controlled fortified city of Grol (now known as Groenlo), during the Eighty Years War and the Anglo–Spanish War in 1627. The Spanish Army, led by Hendrik van den Bergh, came to relieve Grol but too late. The siege lasted from 20 July until 19 August 1627, resulting in the surrender of the city to the Dutch army.

During the siege, a 16 km circumvallation line was made around Grol to prevent the enemy from leaving and to prevent the liberation of the city from outside. Ambrosio Spinola had used a similar technique during the Siege of Breda (1624), and after the successful siege of Grol Frederic-Henry would later use it in other sieges in the Netherlands, such as at the Siege of 's-Hertogenbosch. The success at Grol provided the first serious victory on land for the Republic after the Twelve Years' Truce.

== About Grol ==
Even though it was only a small city, Grol was of military strategic importance. Grol was a flourishing trade center, well fortified and armed, and it had a strategic position on the Hanseatic trade route to Germany. The area around Grol was marshy and difficult to reach, and anyone in control of the city was in control of the region. Maurice of Nassau had taken Grol in 1597, after an unsuccessful try in 1595, and Spinola retook it in 1606. Maurice tried to take Grol again, later during the same year, again unsuccessful, after which Grol remained in Spanish hands until 1627.

Grol provided a defensible place to garrison troops and a freehaven for Spanish raids. Heavy taxes and import duties were collected here from the whole of the Achterhoek and Veluwe, which provided a steady source of income for the Spanish war treasury. Together with the fortified towns of Oldenzaal, Bredevoort and Lingen, Grol could provide a base for attacking the republic from the east. After Oldenzaal had been captured in 1626 by Ernest Casimir, the States-General chose to invest in an army to capture Grol, instead of concentrating solely on sea battles with the Spaniards (which the powerful states Holland and Zeeland wanted).

== Prelude ==
The Dutch Army of Frederic-Henry, totaling over 15,000 footmen and 4,000 cavalry, traveled by foot and boat via the Rhine and unloaded behind Emmerich. As was common practice in those days, the army consisted mainly of mercenaries from all over Europe, including Scottish, English, High-German, Frisian and French troops. English forces were under the command of Edward Cecil. The army arrived at Grol on 20 July 1627. Immediately all major roads leading to Grol were blocked by front runners of the cavalry. 1,000 carts brought gunpowder, bullets, 75 guns, food and all the equipment necessary for besieging and taking over a city.

=== Circumvallation ===
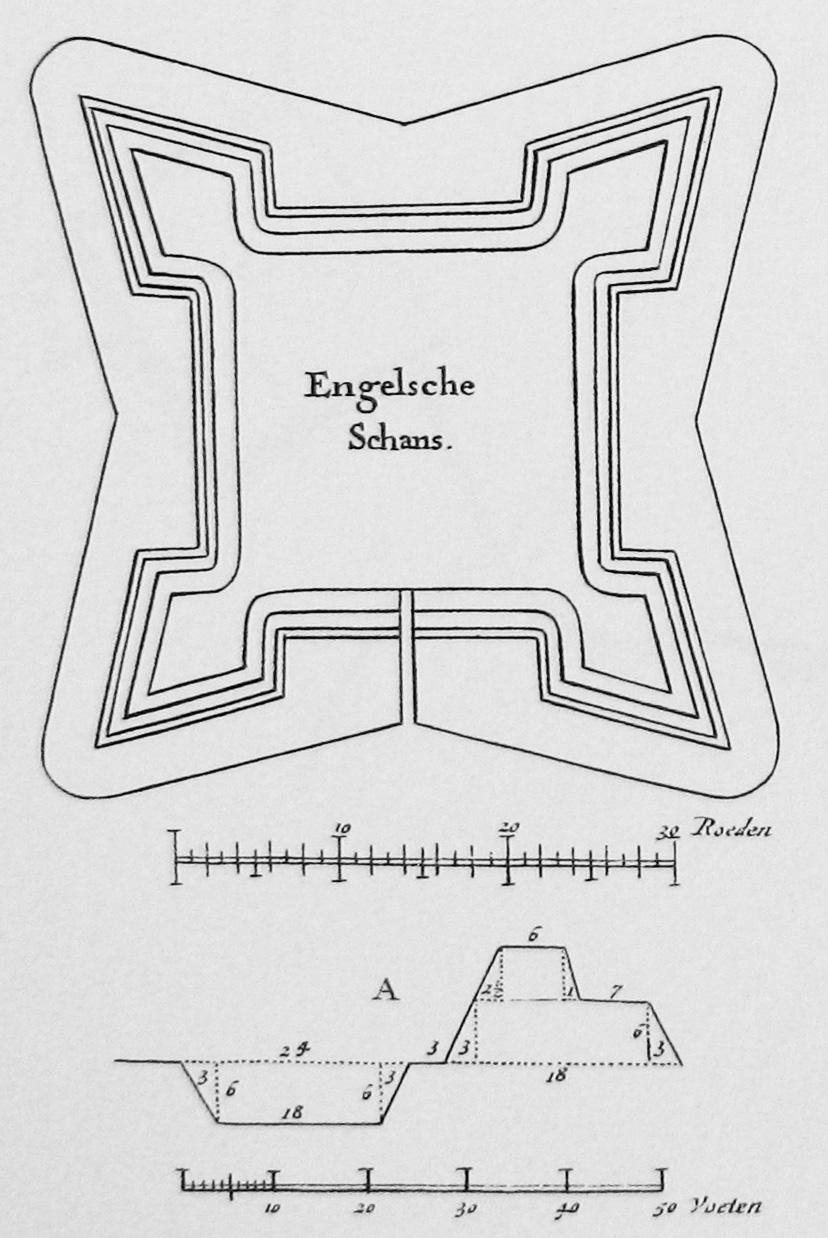
The 'Engelse Schans' (English fort) built by English troops during the siege of Grol

The next day, thousands of soldiers and hired workers began to speedily build a continuous earthen wall around Grol, 10 feet high, 16 kilometers long. Wooden and earthen ramparts, entrenchments and other fortifications were built along the line, including fortified defenses for the troops (Dutch: Schansen).

Frederic-Henry used to let troops of the same nationality work together, so that an English fortification (Engelse Schans) was built by and for the English troops, as well as one for the French, the Frisians and one for the troops from Holland. Guns were placed strategically so that the circumvallation line could be defended from all sides. The reach of the guns placed in Grol was taken into account: they couldn't hit the line which was 2 kilometers from the city. In just 10 days the work was done, though the circumvallation was continually reinforced during the siege.

Frederic-Henry was aware that a large Spanish army was stationed in the south of the Netherlands, commanded by Hendrik van den Bergh. To distract the Spanish army and delay its arrival, and thus avoid a battle in the open field where he would be outnumbered, Frederic-Henry carried out a feigned attack; he sent a part of his own army towards the German town of Gogh. Neighbouring villages around Grol were taken by commanders to prevent the Spanish obtaining a foothold in the neighbourhood. Sentries were placed all around the area and supply lines were set up to Deventer and Zutphen, to feed and supply the massive army now lying around Grol.

== Siege ==
=== Situation in Grol ===
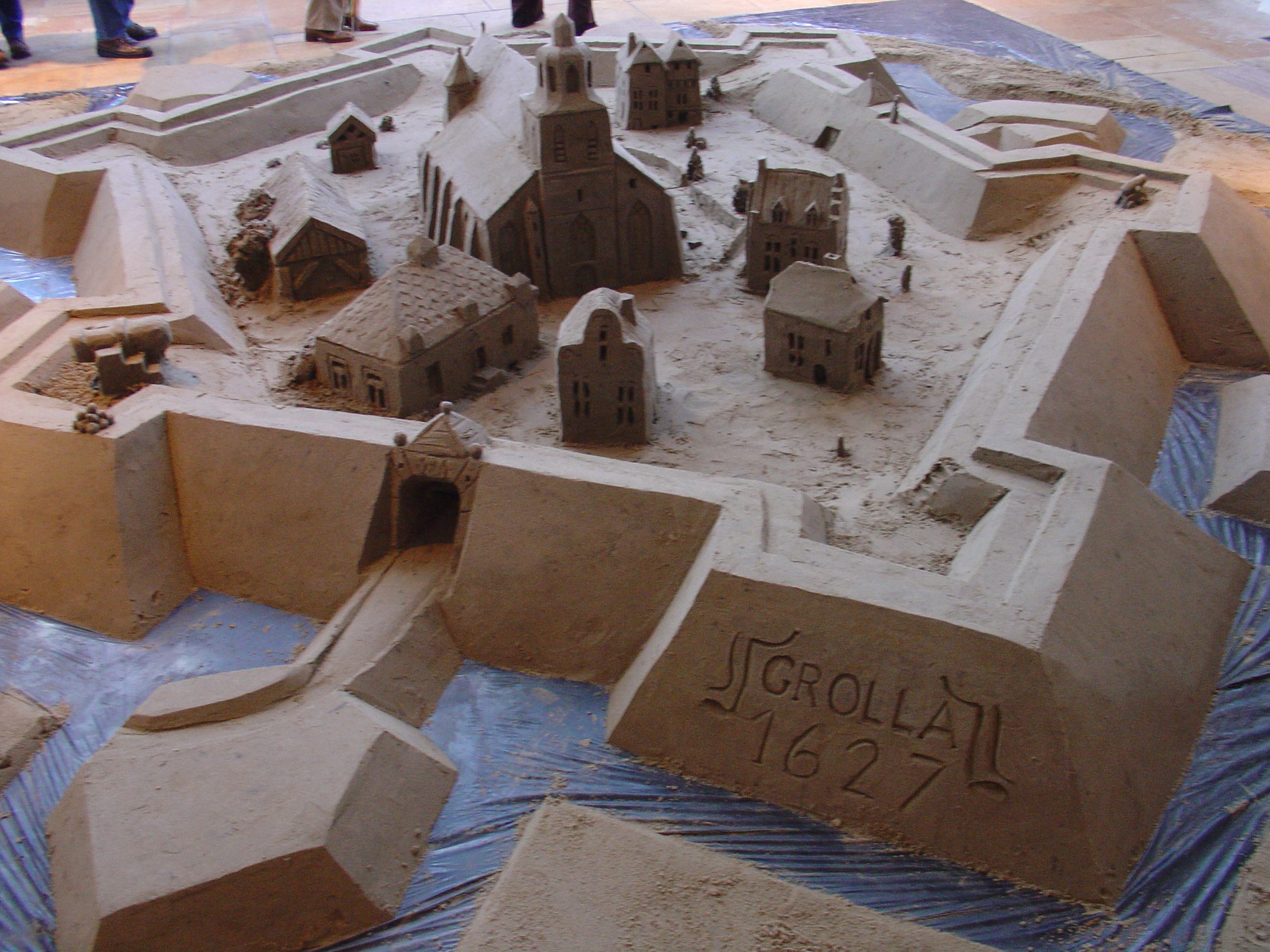
Sandcastle depicting Groenlo during 1627.

Matthijs Dulken, a seasoned and wily commander, was the head of the Spanish army occupying Grol. He had available to him 1,200 foot soldiers (not accounting enlisted citizens) and around 100 cavalry, commanded by Lambert Verreyken. Food and supplies aplenty, Dulken ordered his troops to reinforce the defenses of the already fortified city, and specifically: "...by musket or cannonball, to hurt or damage the enemy any which way". With the circumvallation line ready, Grol was being bombarded by the Dutch army while groups of Dutch, English, French troops dug saps towards the city. Damage done to the city's defenses were continually repaired by the besieged. However, 200 incendiary "fireballs" were shot into the city, causing heavy damage to buildings and people. Dulken himself was wounded in his shoulder by a musket bullet and gave command to Verreyken. Verreyken and his cavalry raided the attackers positions, mainly the trench digging positions and the rampart of Ernst Casimir of Nassau-Dietz, without causing many casualties. In Grol, due to the carelessness of a soldier, two barrels of gunpowder exploded, causing forty bystanders to perish.

=== Activities outside Grol ===
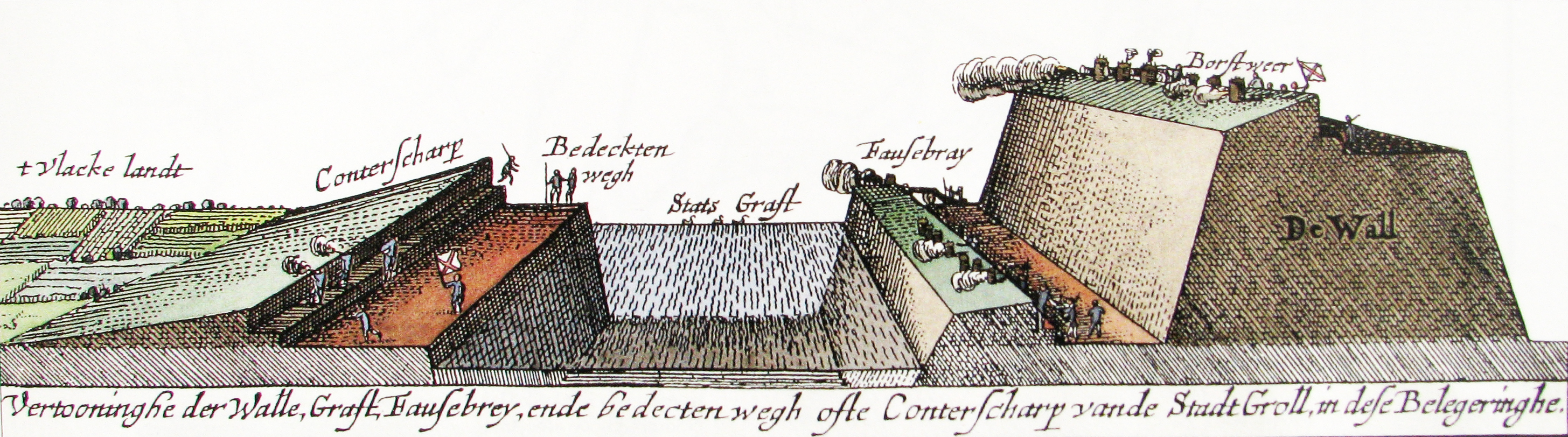
Crosssection of the defensive works around Grol in 1627.

Meanwhile, the English digging team had managed to first reach the canal which lay around Grol and was supplied by the river Slinge. In order to facilitate a crossing, the lock north of the city was blown up, resulting in the lowering of the water in the canal by five feet, which left just nine feet. After that, the Dutch army tried to cross the canal by building a dam, but they were under heavy gunfire from Grol and the dam was fully destroyed by burning oil poured from the city. Finally, with the support of two artillery pieces the attackers managed to build two dams, although casualties were great, including two English officers, Ram and Proud. Having crossed the canal, they could now begin to undermine Grol's outer defensive walls, even though regular attacks were made from out of the city.

=== Arrival of Van den Bergh ===
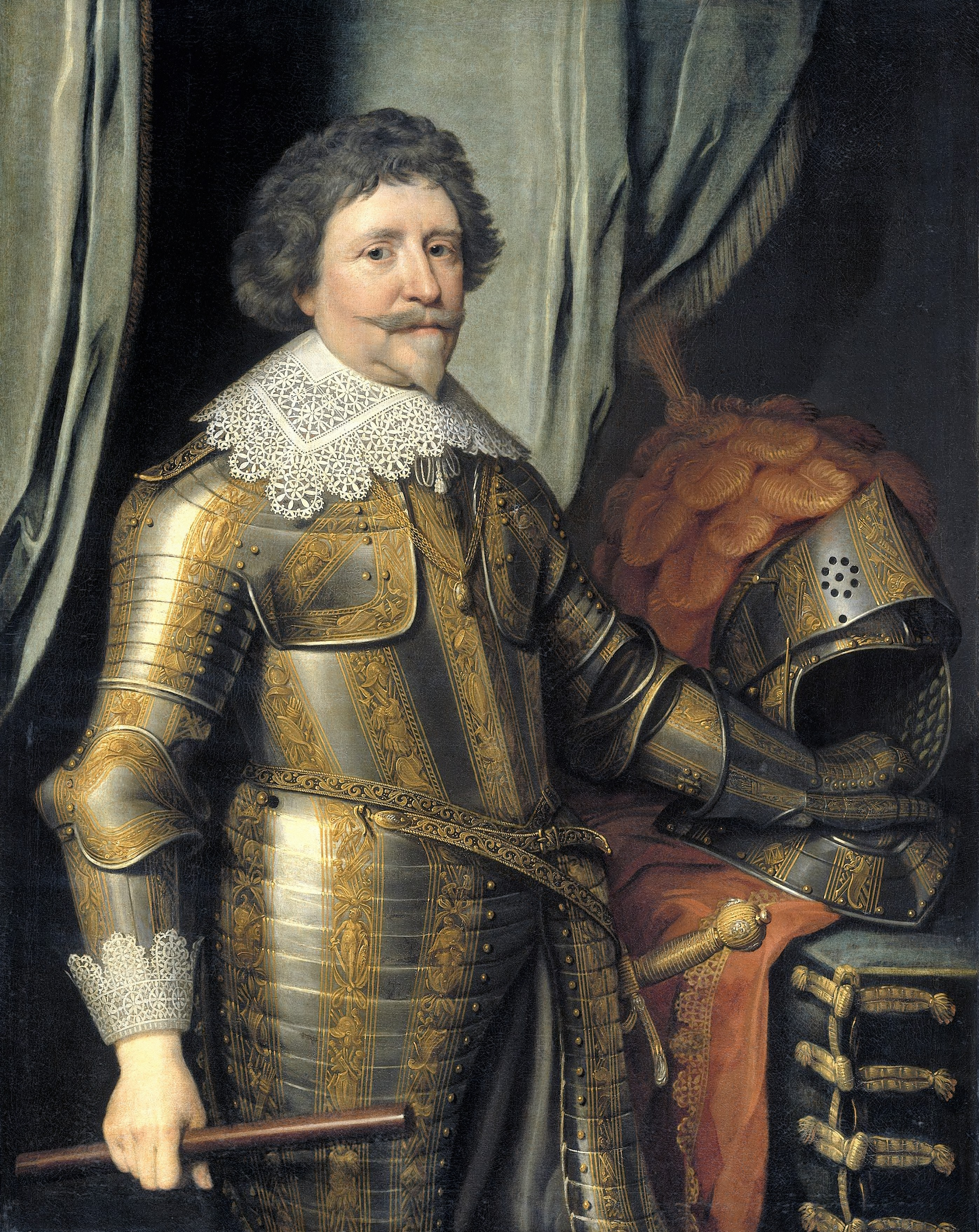
Frederick Henry, Prince of Orange.

In the meantime, Van den Bergh and his formidable Spanish army had arrived near Groenlo after taking in another 1,800 German mercenaries, now outnumbering the army of his cousin, Frederic Henry. However, due to lack of funding they were short on supplies and had arrived too late for a head-to-head battle in the open field. They fired their guns for Grol to hear that help had come. After a failed plan to cut the supply lines of the Dutch army, due to quarrels between Spanish and Italian troops, he decided to attack the circumvallation line and try to break through to Grol. His attack on the Scottish rampart seemed to succeed at first, but a fierce counterattack by Officer Morre drove the Spaniards away, erasing all hope for a victory for Van den Bergh.

=== Negotiations ===
Frederic-Henry now tried to negotiate with Dulken, by convincing him the Spaniards outside the city could no longer save him. Dulken, who had healed from his wound, proudly denied their entreaties. The siege went on. English troops crossed the canal and managed to put a mine under one of Grol's outer defenses (faussebray). The mine was blown up on August 18, creating a huge hole in the defenses. English troops rushed in, climbing the city's earthen walls behind, but Verreyken lay waiting with hundreds of muskets and burning tar, and he repelled the English three times, causing a massacre. Dulken however, intelligent enough in knowing that soon his city would be attacked from three sides, and realizing that he was short on men and guns, called for an armistice and sent for negotiators.

=== Treaty ===
A treaty like the one used after the siege of Breda was signed 3 days later, handing the city to the army of the Republic. The Spanish troops in Grol and its citizens were allowed to leave, taking arms and loot with them, but only 2 guns could be taken. Frederic-Henry loaned 200 carts for the defenders to carry their equipment, as was negotiated. He stationed foot soldiers and horsemen in Grol, as to defend it from future attacks. The complete circumvallation line was destroyed and all trenches filled, to prevent them from being used by future attackers. Archbishop of Utrecht Philippus Rovenius, who resided in the city during the siege, was allowed to leave. Grol was now under the Republic and would remain so until the end of the war.

The victory was celebrated greatly in the Republic. The Spaniards had finally been beaten after many losses. Hugo de Groot wrote all the details of the battle in his 'Grollae Obsidio' and Joost van den Vondel wrote a 738 verse ode to the siege. The saying Zo vaste as Grolle (as sturdy as Grolle) came into being, as a reference to the difficulty of taking the city.

== Present day ==
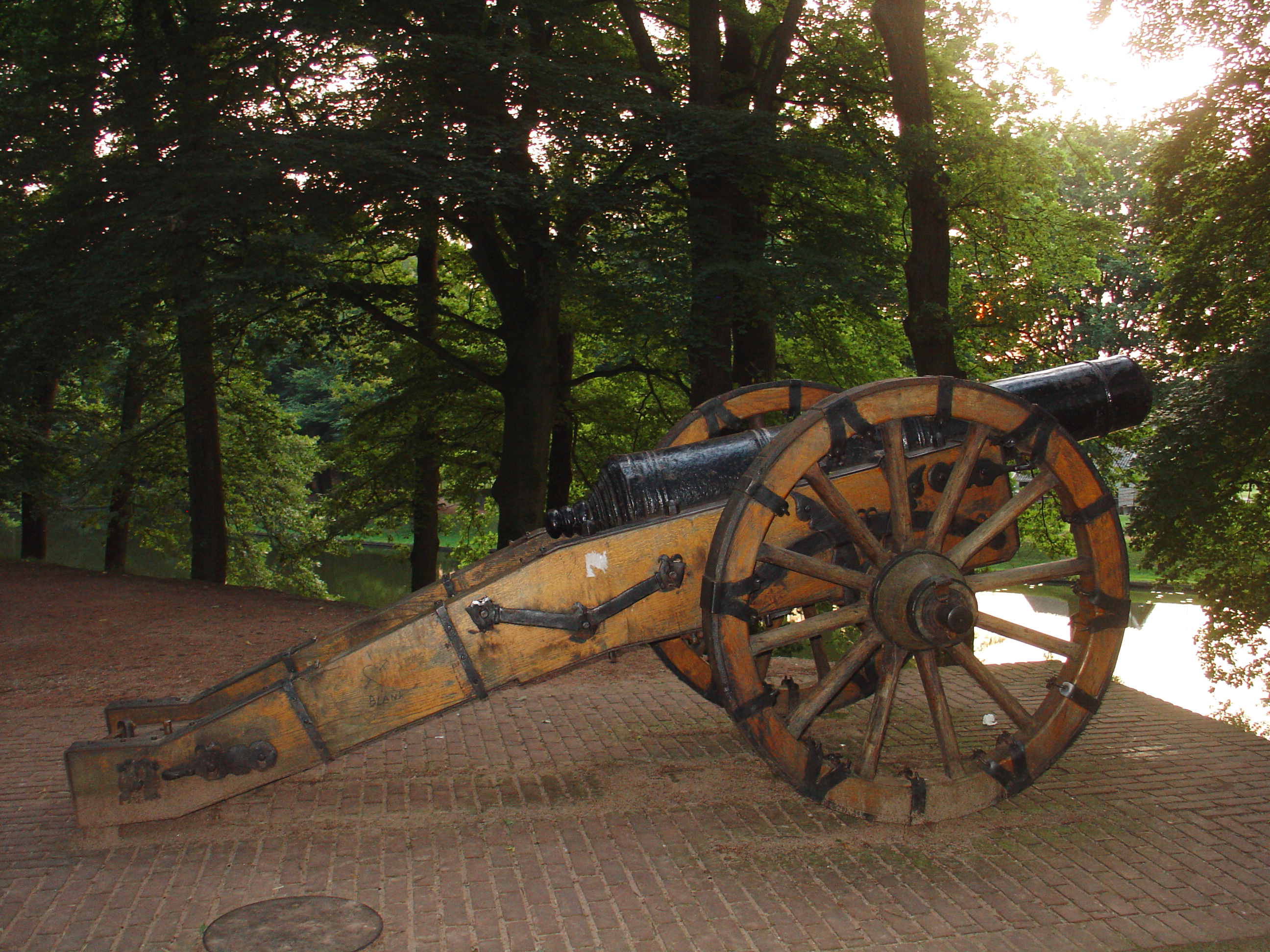
The historic cannon in Groenlo, left behind by Frederic Henry after the siege of Groenlo in 1627.

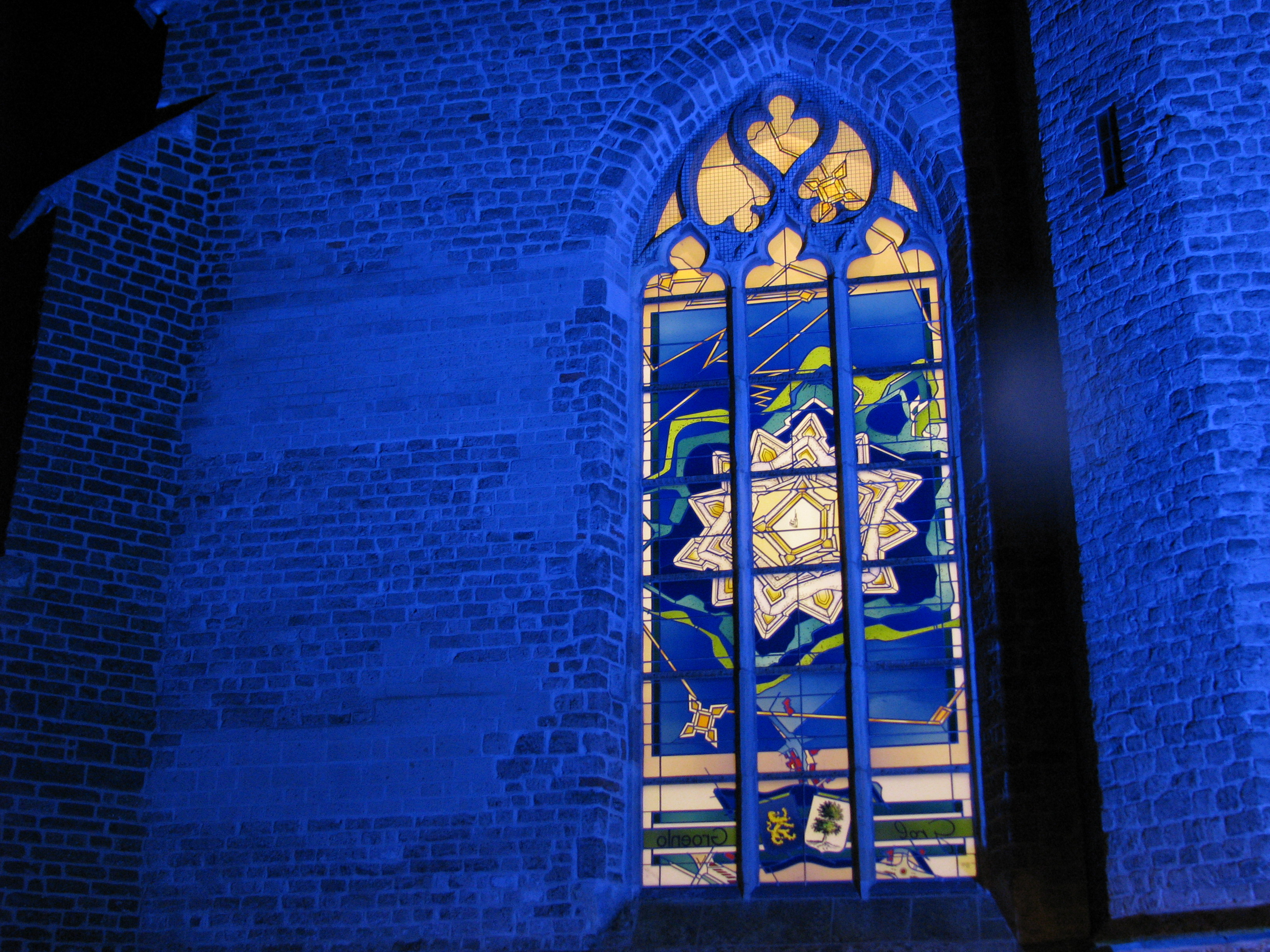
The siege of Grol on a stained glass window, in the Calixtus church in Groenlo (2007).

Groenlo, influenced by Munster and having been under Spanish Catholic control during many years, remains a Catholic enclave in a predominantly Protestant region. Numerous paintings of the siege have been made famous by well known artists of the period

In the town of Groenlo, old Grol, cannons and some parts of the old bulwarks have been restored for historic and tourism purposes. Live reenactments of the events of 1627 take place on a regular basis, drawing sizable crowds - these are known as the 'Slag om Grolle'. In recent years, more and more parts of the original circumvallation line are being rediscovered. It is being discussed whether the full 16 kilometer long line can be restored. During 2006 and 2007, the (Old) Calixtus church in Groenlo has undergone a major renovation, including the placement of a new stained glass window depicting the siege of Groenlo of 1627. The church has survived all of the six sieges that Groenlo has been through during the 16th and 17th century. After the siege of 1627, the States-General paid for the breaking of a church window that occurred during the siege.

In the hot Dutch summer of 2003, an ultralight plane discovered mysteriously green plants in an otherwise barren corn field. It just so happened to be the outlines of the French rampart of 1627 (Franse Schans). The canals around the rampart changed the soil or water flow, making the plants stay green. The English rampart was found earlier near Lievelde and has been fully restored and it can be visited.

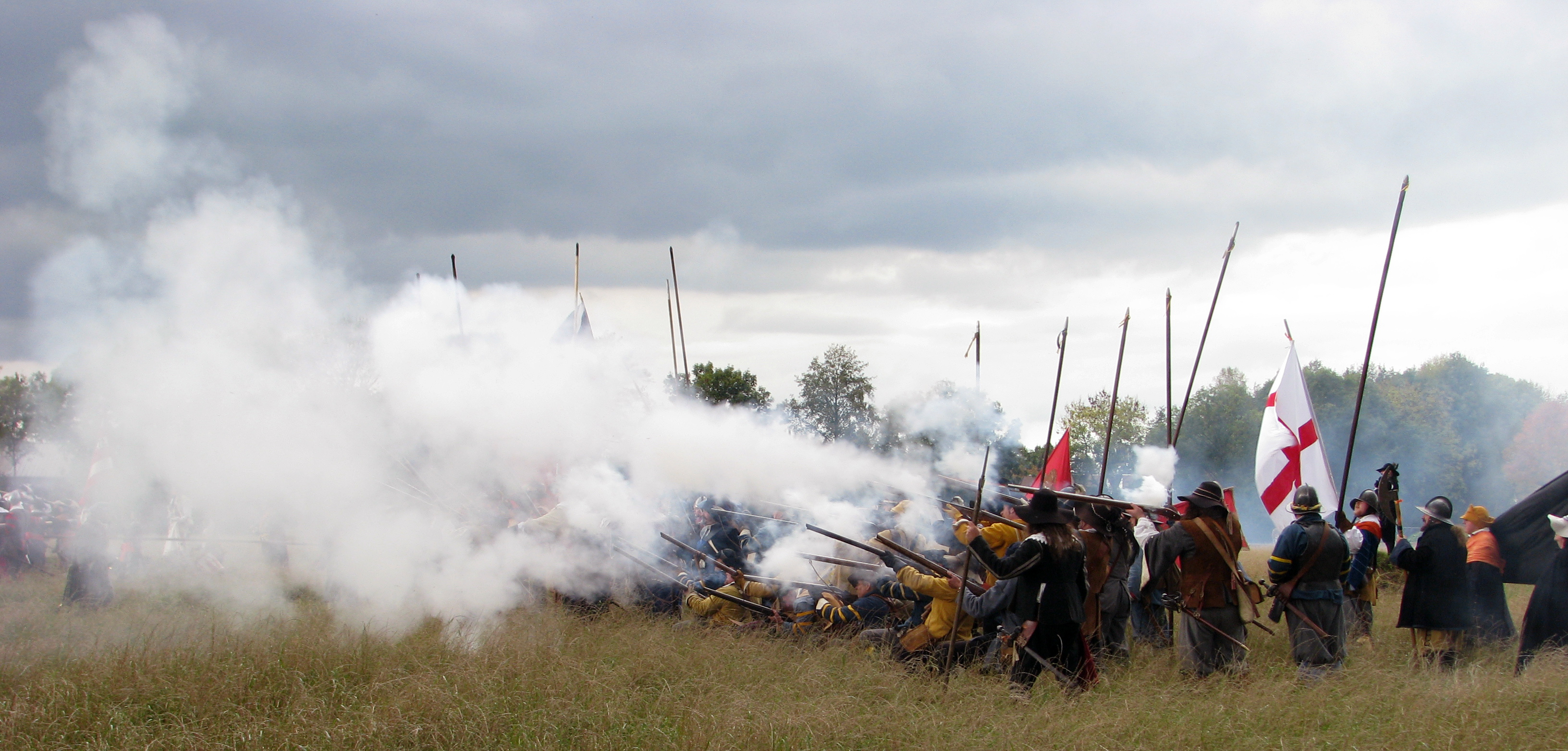
A reenactment from 2008

=== Reenactment ===
The 'Battle of Grolle' is a regular historical reenactment of the siege. It is held in and around Groenlo itself every two years. The event lasts for three days and features a historic battle reenactment and a historic fair. The event was held for the first time in 2005, and since then reenactors from France, Germany, United Kingdom, the Czech Republic as well as the Netherlands have taken part. The latest re-enactment was in October 2024.
