= Matthys =

Matthys is a family surname that could refer to:

== Surname ==
- Danny Matthys, Flemish-Belgian visual artist
- Hervé Matthys, Belgian footballer
- Jan Matthys, Dutch religious leader
- Luc Julian Matthys, Belgian-born, Australian Roman Catholic bishop
- Tim Matthys, Belgian footballer
- Victor Matthys, Belgian politician

== See also ==
- Mathys
- Matthijs
