= Matthijs van den Bos =

Dutch anthropologist

Matthijs Eduard Willem van den Bos (born 19 April 1969 in Haarlem) is a scholar of Iranian and Shi'i Studies. He teaches in the Department of Politics at Birkbeck College of the University of London. Professor van den Bos has been a Visitor at the Institute for Advanced Study in Princeton, NJ, a fellow of the Institute for Migration and Ethnic Studies at the University of Amsterdam, and a fellow at the International Institute for the Study of Islam in the Modern World (ISIM) in Leiden. Before joining the University of London, van den Bos taught at the Universities of Utrecht and Amsterdam.

Van den Bos has undertaken extensive field research in Iran, Tajikistan, and among Shiite communities in Western Europe. An anthropologist and scholar of Iranian Studies by training, he has published particularly in the realm of Sufism in Iran and of European Shi'ism, and contributed, among other things, several entries on Iranian Sufism to the Encyclopaedia of Islam (third edition), the most authoritative encyclopedia in Islamic Studies. His full list of publications is available at https://birkbeck.academia.edu/MatthijsvandenBos

Professor van den Bos has received many research awards, among them multi-year grants from the Wenner-Gren Foundation and the Netherlands Organization of Sciences (NWO). He is a Fellow of the Higher Education Academy (2010).

His book "Mystic Regimes: Sufism and the State in Iran, from the late Qajar era to the Islamic Republic," published by Brill Academic Publishers, has been reviewed in, among others, the Zeitschrift der Deutschen Morgenländischen Gesellschaft and the International Journal of Middle East Studies.
