= Polaroid art =

Techniques used to modify instant pictures for an artistic effect

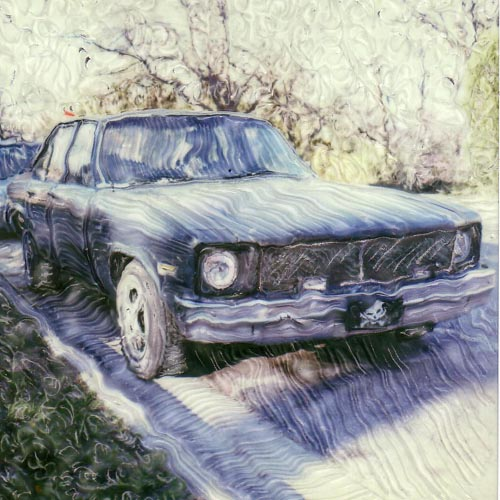
An example of emulsion manipulation

Polaroid art is a type of alternative photography which consists of modifying an instant picture, usually while it is being developed. The most common types of Polaroid art are the emulsion lift, the Polaroid transfer and emulsion manipulation.

== Emulsion lift ==
An emulsion lift, or emulsion transfer, is a process used to remove the photographic emulsion from an instant print. The emulsion can then be transferred to another material, such as glass, wood or paper. The emulsion lift technique can be performed on peel-apart film and Polaroid Originals integral film, but not on Fujifilm Instax film. The procedure, for integral type film, involves cutting off the picture's border, separating the negative layer from the positive layer and submerging the positive layer in warm water. The emulsion will start to come free from the plastic layer and float on the water. While it is still wet, it can be placed on another material and shaped. It can be laid flat, or it can be folded, ripped or otherwise customized as desired.

When done with Fujifilm FP-100C, the picture is placed in water near the boiling point and then submerged in cold water. This will release the emulsion, which resembles cellophane and is harder to manipulate than Polaroid emulsions.

== Polaroid transfer ==
A Polaroid transfer, sometimes known as an image transfer, is a technique used to develop a peel-apart film picture on to a different material, like drawing paper. In a Polaroid transfer, the image is peeled apart prematurely and the negative is placed down on a desired material. A roller is sometimes used to ensure the negative is laying down flat on the material. After a certain amount of time, the negative is peeled back.

== Emulsion manipulation ==
Emulsion manipulation is used to modify integral film pictures while they are developing. The technique yields the best results with the original SX-70 Time Zero film, which was discontinued in 2005, and the currently manufactured Polaroid Originals film is less manipulable. As the picture develops, modifications can performed by applying pressure on the surface of the film, using tools that do not scratch the outer plastic layer. Alternatively a pattern can be superimposed on the image by laying the film face-down on a textured surface and applying pressure. As development finishes the emulsion hardens, but to continue the manipulation it can be softened by warming it up. The technique was used to make the cover of Peter Gabriel's third self-titled album.
