= Mathisen =

Mathisen is a Norwegian surname. As of January 2014, there are 7,669 people in Norway with this surname.

== Notable people ==
Notable people with this surname include:

- Alexander Mathisen (born 1986), Norwegian footballer
- Anders Greif Mathisen (born 1974), Norwegian politician
- Arild Mathisen (born 1942), Norwegian footballer
- Bente Stein Mathisen (born 1956), Norwegian politician
- Hans Mathisen (born 1967), Norwegian jazz musician
- Ivar Mathisen (1920–2008), Norwegian sprint canoer
- Jesper Mathisen (born 1987), Norwegian footballer
- Jørgen Mathisen (born 1984), Norwegian jazz musician
- Leo Mathisen (1906–1969), Danish jazz musician
- Mathis Mathisen (born 1937), Norwegian teacher and author
- Nils Mathisen (born 1959), Norwegian jazz musician
- Ole Mathisen (born 1965), Norwegian jazz musician
- Oscar Mathisen (1888–1954), Norwegian speed skater
- Per Mathisen (born 1969), Norwegian jazz musician
- Svein Mathisen (1952–2011), Norwegian footballer
- Tom Mathisen (born 1952), Norwegian comedian
- Tyler Mathisen (born 1954), American journalist
