= Joel Berglund =

Swedish actor

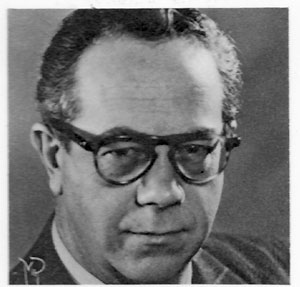
- Joel Berglund
- Born: 4 June 1903; Stockholm, Sweden
- Died: 21 January 1985 (aged 81); Stockholm, Sweden
- Occupation: Opera singer (bass baritone)
- Years active: 1929–1968

Joel Ingemar Berglund, born 4 June 1903 in Torsåker, Archdiocese of Uppsala in Gästrikland, Sweden, died 21 January 1985 in Stockholm, was a Swedish opera singer (Bass-baritone), and the director of Royal Swedish Opera and Hovsångare.

== Biography ==
Berglund read a note in the Swedish newspaper Norrlands-Posten that you could get free singing education at the Royal Swedish Academy of Music in Stockholm, Sweden and for that to test singing. He was accepted and soon became one of Sweden's notable singers. He studied singing with Oskar Lejdström and John Forsell at the Music Conservatory in Stockholm from 1922 to 1928.

In 1929, he had his debut as Monterone in Rigoletto at the Royal Swedish Opera in Stockholm. He often played in Vienna, Buenos Aires, Chicago, Berlin, Budapest and New York. Berglund won particularly a great reputation as an interpreter of Richard Wagner's roles, including the title role in The Flying Dutchman, a role he also performed at Bayreuth.

He was the head of the Royal Swedish Opera in Stockholm between 1949 and 1956, and retired from there in 1957. He then gave concerts and guest plays, and was active no later than the spring of 1968, as Philip II in Verdi's Don Carlos.

Berglund was also active as a singing teacher. Edith Thallaug and Gösta Winbergh were some of his students. He was awarded the Latvian Order of the Three Stars 5th Class on 16 May 1935.

Joel Berglund is buried in Torsåker Cemetery in Sweden.
