= Matthijs Dulken =

Matthijs, Matthias or Matheus van Dulcken (died 1634 in Winterswijk) was mayor of Roermond in 1610, 1616 and 1629. In 1627 he was the Spanish governor of Grol (Groenlo), and Licensor of Upper Guelders. He commanded Groenlo during the 1627 siege by Frederick Henry and, though wounded by a musket ball, he survived the battle and on 19 August that year signed the agreement that handed the town over to States troops. After his final year as mayor in 1629 he served for a period as schepen. He married Helwich van Wessum and they had one son, Christophorus, in 1593.
