= Robin Mathy =

American researcher and activist (born 1957)

Robin Michele Mathy (born July 21, 1957) is an American researcher and activist who has published four books and more than 50 peer-reviewed articles or book chapters.

Her first book, Male Homosexuality in Four Societies: Brazil, Guatemala, the Philippines, and the United States, coauthored with Frederick L. Whitam, has been in print since 1986 and was selected by the New York Times Review of Books as one of the "Best Books in Print" in anthropology. Her work has been cited over 6000 times in peer-reviewed journals, giving her an h-index of 26. Mathy is a member of the editorial board of the Journal of Sexual Health Psychology.

== Education ==
Mathy has graduate degrees in sociology from Indiana University Bloomington, social Work from University of Minnesota-Twin Cities, international relations from the University of Cambridge, and evidence-based health care from the University of Oxford.

== Selected publications ==
- Male Homosexuality in Four Societies: Brazil, Guatemala, the Philippines, and the United States, Praeger Publishers, 1985. Author. ISBN 0030042984.
- Childhood Gender Nonconformity and the Development of Adult Homosexuality, CRC Press, 2007. Editor. ISBN 0789037459.
- Lesbian And Bisexual Women's Mental Health, Routledge, 2004. Editor. ISBN 0789026813.
- Preventive Health Measures for Lesbian and Bisexual Women, CRC Press, 2007. Editor. ISBN 078903333X.
