= Carl Berglund =

Swedish politician (1859–1921)

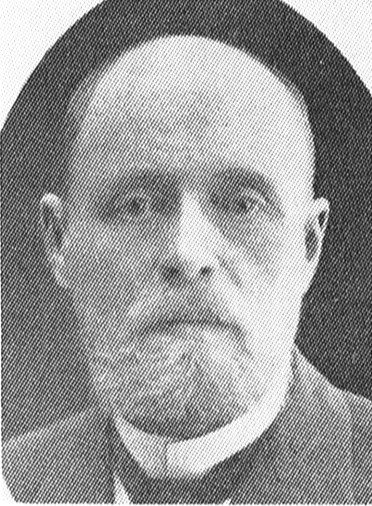

Member of the Swedish parliament
- In office 1919

Personal details
- Born: 1859
- Died: June 30, 1921
- Political party: Centre Party
- Occupation: politician and newspaper editor

Carl Berglund (1859 – June 30, 1921) was a Swedish politician. He was a member of the Centre Party. He was elected to the Swedish parliament (upper house) in 1919.
