= Mr. Polaroid =

2025 documentary film

Mr. Polaroid is a 2025 documentary film about Edwin Land, the inventor of the Polaroid camera. It was written and directed by Gene Tempest.
