= Polaroid Land Camera 1000 =

Instant camera model

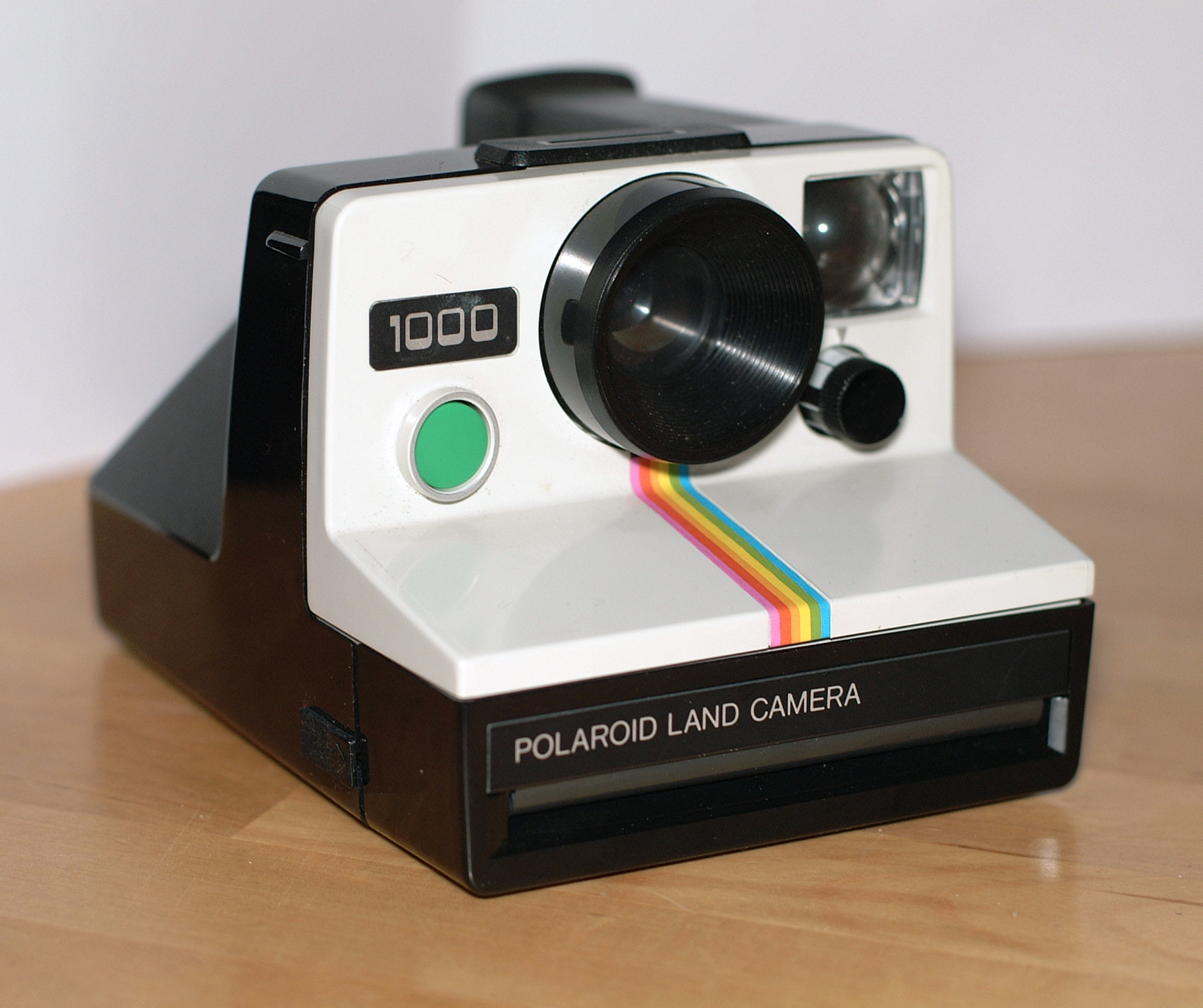
POLAROID LAND CAMERA 1000 (1977)

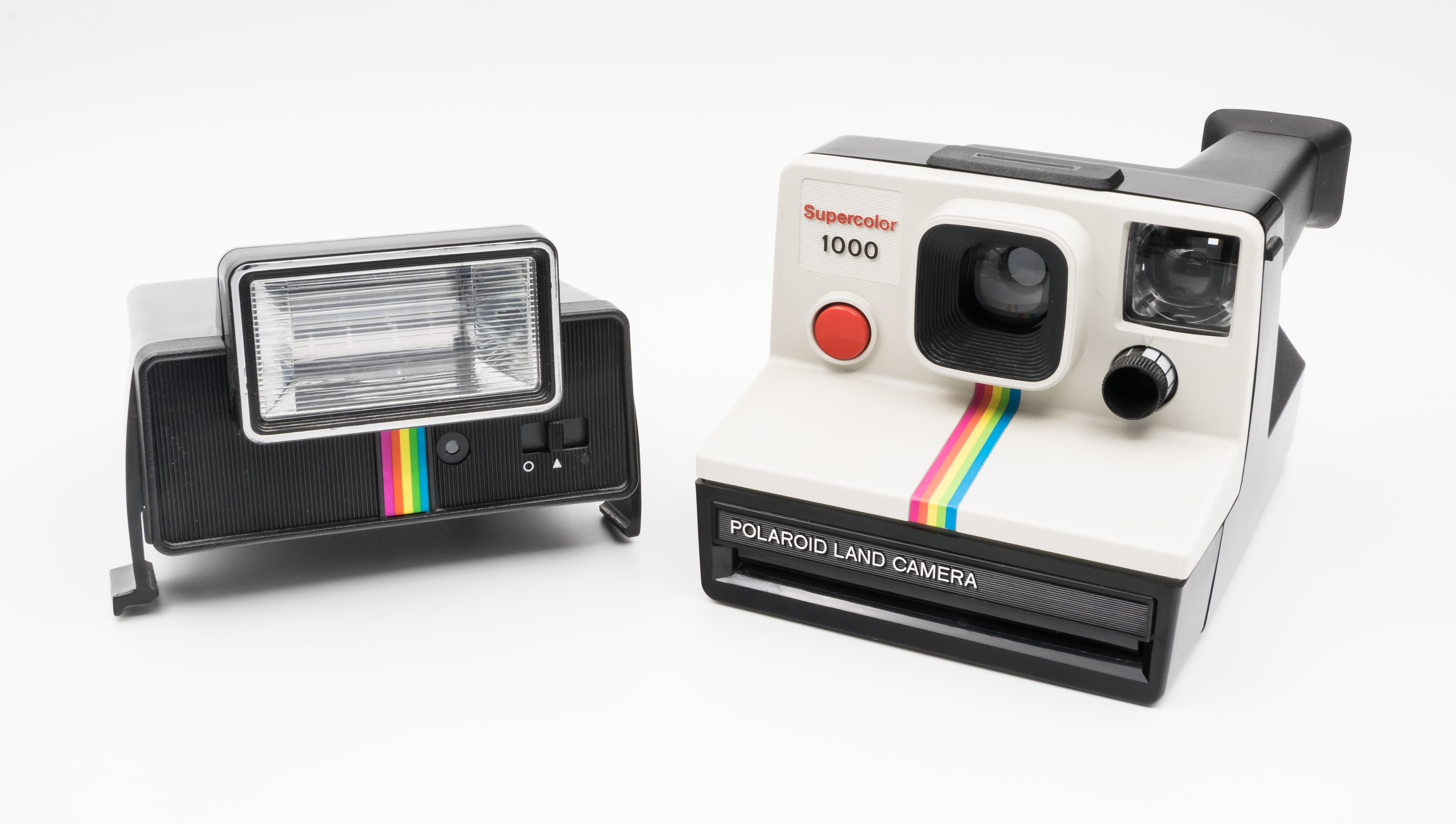
POLAROID LAND CAMERA Supercolor 1000 with separated Q-light flash (1981)

The Land Camera 1000 is an instant camera manufactured by Polaroid Corporation. In the United States, it was marketed as the OneStep. Based on the Polaroid SX-70, the camera includes a one element 103mm f/14.6 plastic lens, fixed focus and an exposure compensation dial knob. It uses the SX-70 time zero film. There is a flash specifically made for this model: the Q-light flash. They had two unique shutter colors: red and green.

== History ==
The Polaroid SX-70, while popular upon release in 1972, was considered expensive at a cost of $180. Polaroid eventually created significantly less expensive alternatives: rigid plastic Presto, and the OneStep series. With a release price of $40 (equivalent to $213 in 2025), the Land Camera 1000 became the best-selling camera of the 1977 Christmas shopping season. Later, Polaroid released Type 600 integral series cameras, utilizing the same film format and cartridge but with a different film formulation.
