= Polaroid Swinger =

Model of Polaroid camera

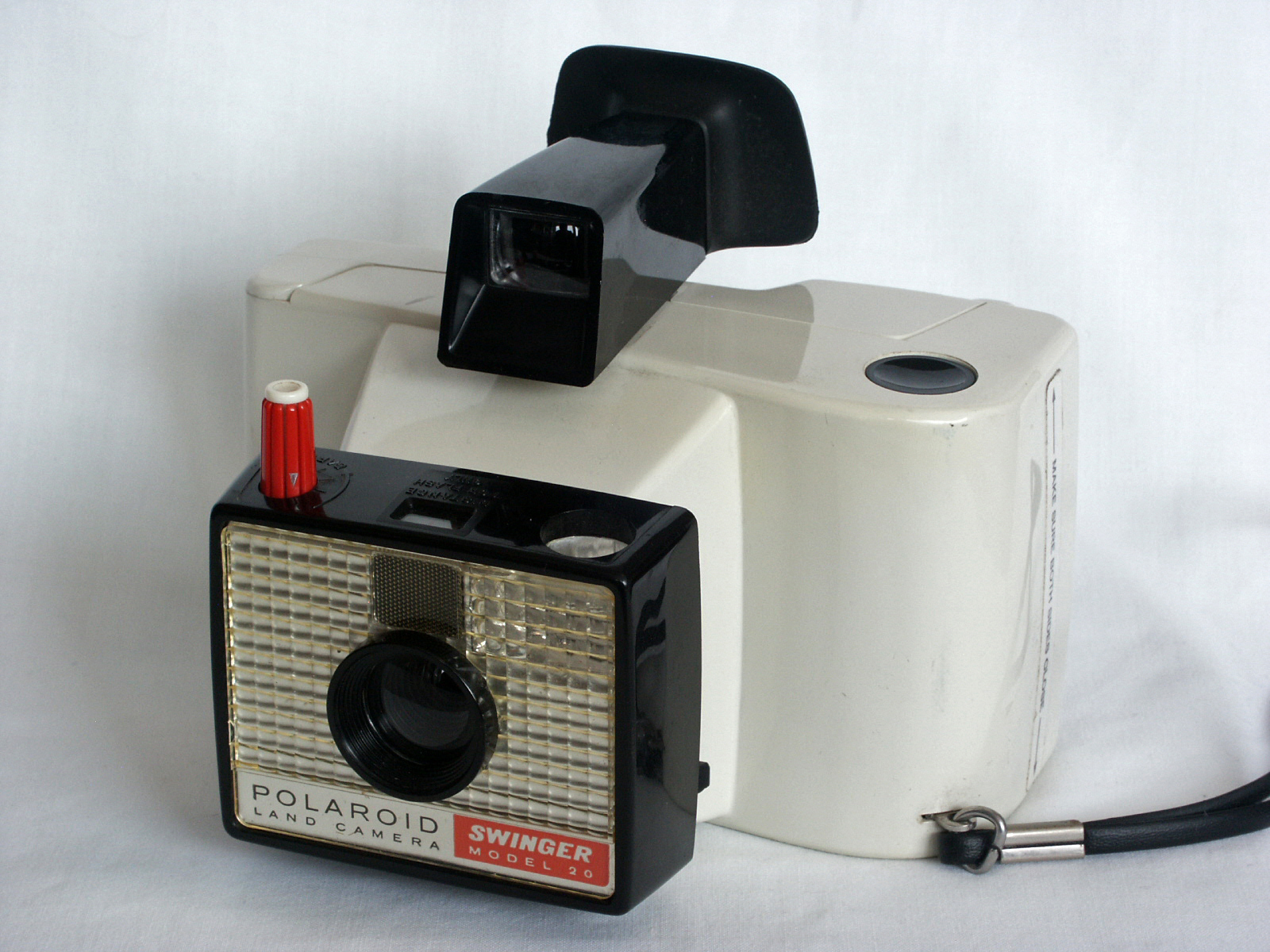
Polaroid Swinger

The Polaroid Model 20 "Swinger" was a popular Land Camera produced by the Polaroid Corporation between July 1965 and 1970. At $19.95 (equivalent to US$204 in 2025) and weighing only 21 ounces (600 g), it was the first truly inexpensive instant camera, a fact that helped fuel its enormous popularity and made it one of the top-selling cameras of all time. The Swinger was especially successful in the youth market due to its low price, stylish appearance, catchy Meet the Swinger jingle, and widespread availability in drugstores. In fact, it was so successful that it became Polaroid's best selling product at the time, and increased their share in the new camera market.

== History ==
The camera was designed by Henry Dreyfuss.

One source for the name claims that when copywriter Phyllis Robinson of Doyle Dane Bernbach watched Edwin H. Land walk into her office swinging the camera from his wrist, she decided on the name "Swinger".

The Swinger featured an extinction exposure meter tied to the aperture which displayed the word "YES" in a window below the viewfinder when the exposure was set correctly. Earlier models also displayed the word "NO" when not properly adjusted, while later units used only the YES indicator. The Swinger also included a built-in flashgun for AG-1 flashbulb and a single element lens.

The Swinger used Polaroid's 20-Series roll film, which was the first Polaroid roll film to develop outside the camera. The Swinger only used black and white film that kept its price low originally at $1.99 (equivalent to US$16.40 in 2020), but each roll produced small 2½" × 3¼" wallet size prints that were little more than half the 3 1/4" x 4 1/4" size of 40-Series Land Picture Rolls.

By 1970, sales went down because young people did not like the quality of the photos, and those who did buy the camera used two rolls of film on average.

Variants included the Model M-15 "Swinger Sentinel" (the Swinger II in non-US markets), which was a cheaper Swinger without the built-in flash, and the Model 3000 "Big Swinger", which used 100-Series pack film instead of the old-style picture rolls. The Swinger name was also used on several international-market Polaroid cameras in the 1960s and 1970s.

== Song ==
The song of the commercial Meet the Swinger was sung by Barry Manilow and a female chorus with the music written by Mitch Leigh and the lyrics that used the instructions of how to take photographs with the camera and also revealed the price were written by Phyllis Robinson. Two commercials were released at the time, both featuring Ali MacGraw as one of four young people going to the beach or on a picnic on bicycles then photographing the day's fun as a record of their memories.
