= Polaroid SX-70 =

Instant camera model

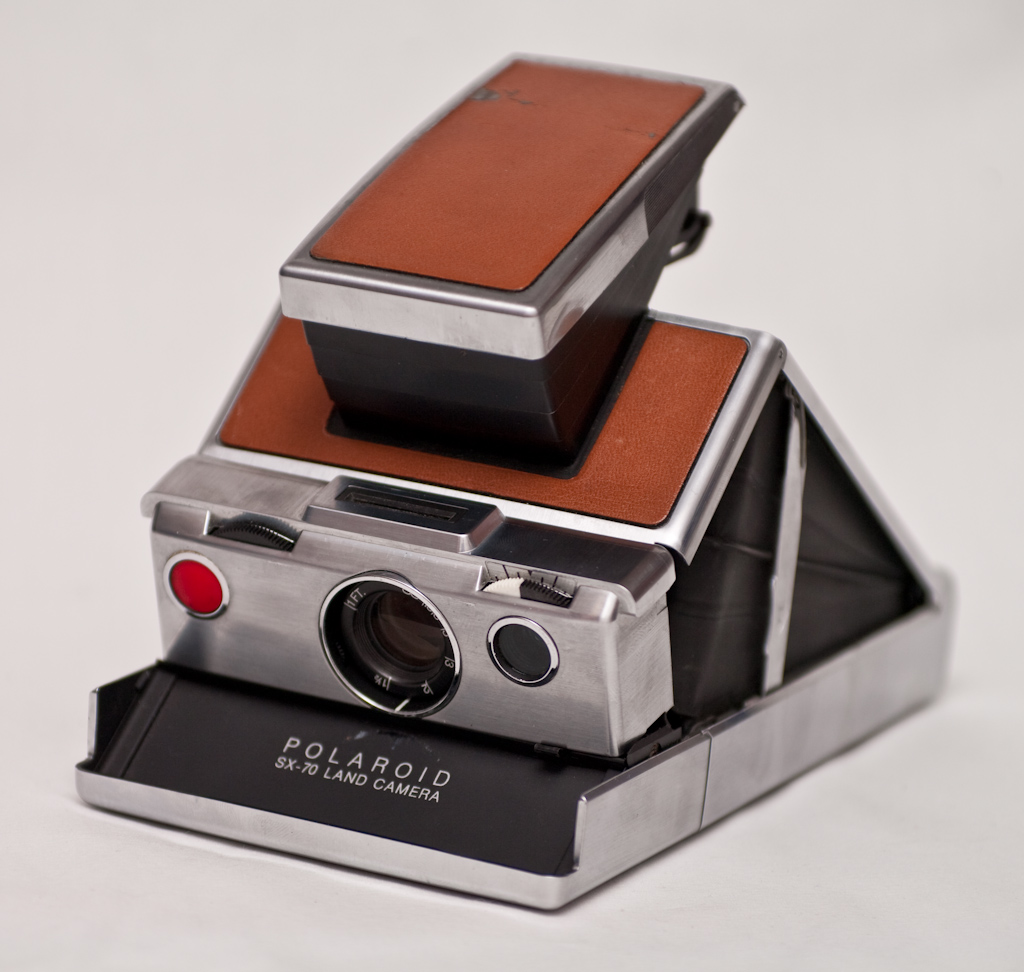
- An opened SX-70, ready for use

Overview
- Maker: Polaroid Corporation
- Type: Single-lens reflex
- Production: 1972–1981

Lens
- Lens: 4-element 116 mm f/8 fixed glass

Sensor/medium
- Film format: SX-70
- Film size: 79 mm × 79 mm (3 1/8 in × 3 1/8 in)
- Film speed: 160
- Recording medium: Instant film
- Film advance: Automatic

Focusing
- Focus: Manual; Automatic (on Sonar models)

General
- Battery: 6 V Polapulse cell inside film pack
- Body features: glass-filled polysulfone (Model 1); ABS (Models 2 and 3)
- Made in: United States

Chronology
- Successor: 600 series, including Polaroid Impulse

The Polaroid SX-70 is a folding single lens reflex Land Camera which was produced by the Polaroid Corporation from 1972 to 1981. The SX-70 helped popularize instant photography.

== History ==
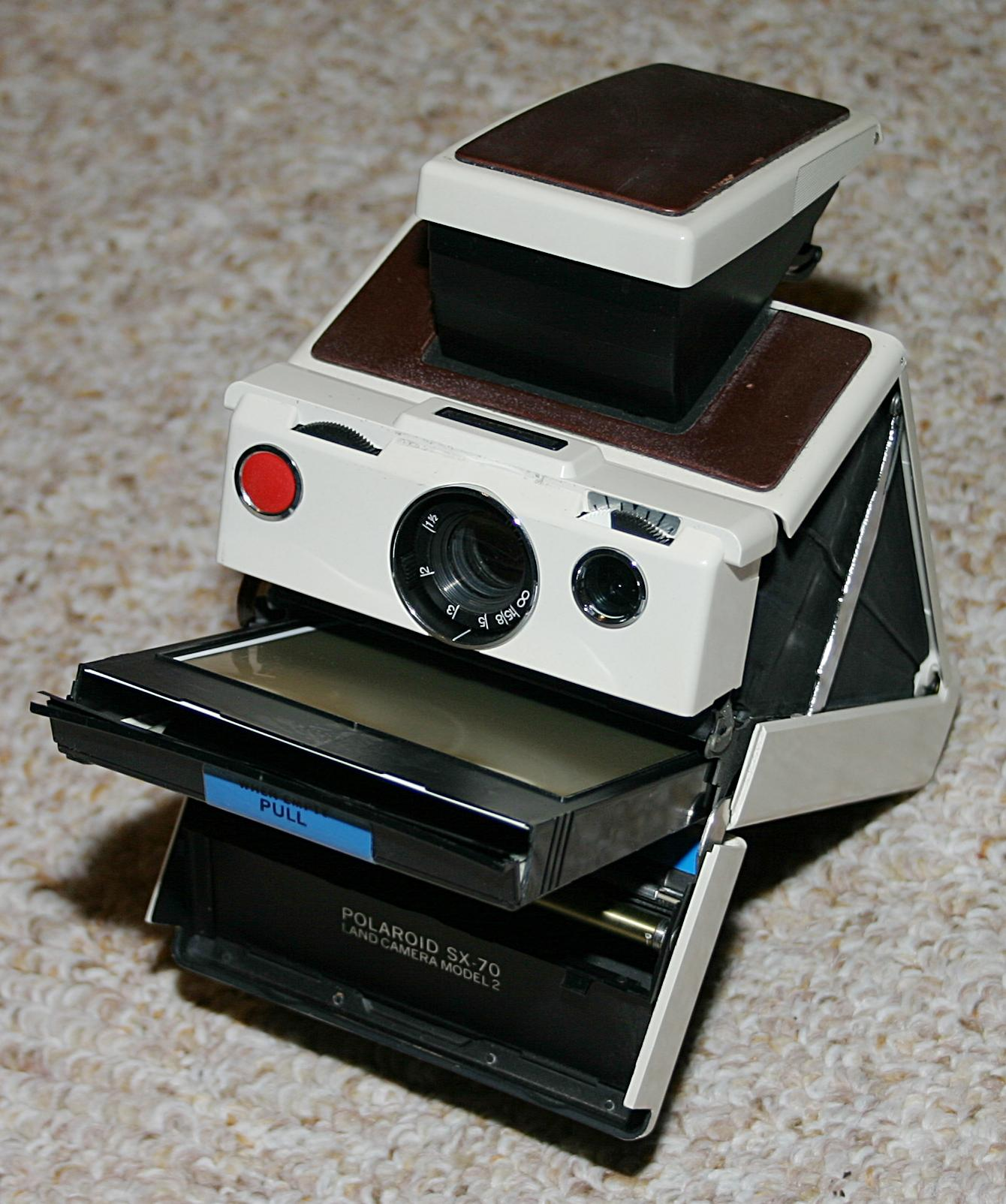
SX-70 Model 2 with expired film cartridge protruding from the front

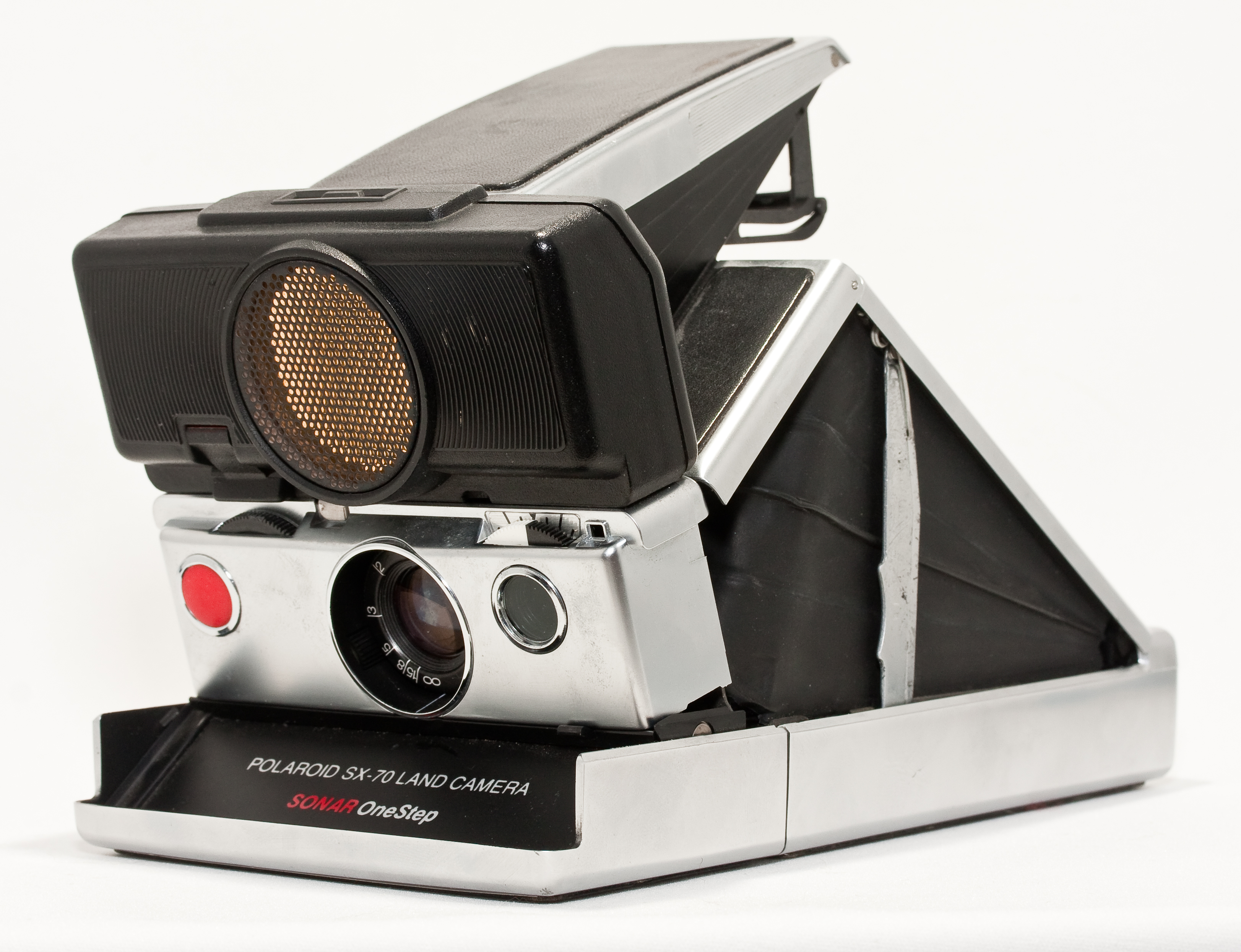
SX-70 Sonar OneStep

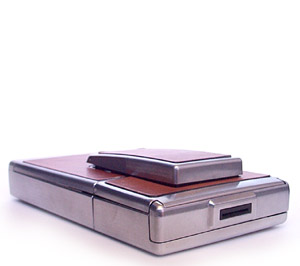
A fully collapsed SX-70 Model 1

In 1948, Polaroid introduced its first consumer camera. The Land Camera Model 95 was the first camera to use instant film to quickly produce photographs without developing them in a laboratory. Although popular, the Model 95 and subsequent Land Cameras required complex procedures to take and produce good photographs. The photographic paper for each picture had to be manually removed from the camera and peeled open after 60 seconds to reveal the image, which needed to be hand-coated with a chemical stabilizer for preservation. The picture required several minutes to dry, and the process could leave developing chemicals on the hands. The instructions for the Model 20 Swinger, introduced in 1965, warned that, if not followed, "you're headed for plenty of picture taking trouble".

Pictures from the SX-70, by contrast, ejected automatically and developed quickly (fully within 10 minutes) without chemical residue. Polaroid founder Edwin H. Land announced the SX-70 at a company annual meeting in April 1972. On stage, he took out a folded SX-70 from his suit coat pocket and, in just ten seconds, produced five photographs, both actions impossible with previous Land Cameras. The company first sold the SX-70 in Miami, Florida, in late 1972, and began selling it nationally in fall 1973. Although the high cost of $180 for the camera and $6.90 for each film pack of ten pictures ($1,385 and $53 respectively when adjusted for inflation) limited demand, Polaroid sold 700,000 by mid-1974. In 1973–74, the Skylab 3 and 4 astronauts used an SX-70 to photograph a video display screen to be able to compare the Sun's features from one orbit to the next.

There were a variety of models, beginning in 1972 with the original SX-70, though all shared the same basic design. The first model had a plain focusing screen (the user was expected to be able to see and discern whether an image was in focus) because Land wanted to encourage photographers to think they were looking at the subject rather than through a viewfinder. When many users complained that focusing was difficult, especially in dim light, a split-image rangefinder prism was added. This feature is standard on all later manual-focus models.

The later Sonar OneStep (introduced in 1978) and SLR 680 models were equipped with a sonar autofocus system. This sonar autofocus system greatly helped the user's ability to focus the camera, especially in dark environments, and could be turned off if manual focus was needed. The Sonar OneStep models were the first autofocus SLRs available to consumers. The later SLR 680/690 models updated the basic design of the Sonar OneStep to more modern standards by incorporating support for newer 600 film cartridges instead of SX-70 cartridges, and a built-in flash instead of the disposable "Flash Bar". Today, they are the most evolved forms of the SX-70 and are highly sought after by Polaroid enthusiasts.

Though expensive, the SX-70 was popular in the 1970s and retains a cult following today. Photographers such as Ansel Adams, Andy Warhol, Helmut Newton, and Walker Evans praised and used the SX-70. Helmut Newton used the camera for fashion shoots. Walker Evans began using the camera in 1973 when he was 70 years old. Not until the $40 Model 1000 OneStep using SX-70 film became the best-selling camera of the 1977 Christmas shopping season, however, did its technology become truly popular. More recently, it inspired the name of the Belfast alternative band SX-70.

== Design features ==
The SX-70 included many sophisticated design elements. A collapsible SLR required a complex light path for the viewfinder, with three mirrors (including one Fresnel reflector) of unusual, aspheric shapes set at odd angles to create an erect image on the film and an erect aerial image for the viewfinder. Many mechanical parts were precision plastic moldings. The body was made of glass-filled polysulfone, a rigid plastic which was plated with a thin layer of copper-nickel-chromium alloy to give a metallic appearance. Models 2 and 3 used ABS in either Ebony or Ivory color. The film pack contained a flat, 6-volt "PolaPulse" battery to power the camera electronics, drive motor, and flash. The original flash system, a disposable "Flash Bar" consisting of 10 bulbs (five on each side, with the user rotating the bar halfway through) from General Electric, used logic circuits to detect and fire the next unused flash.

== Models ==
Although various models were offered, all share the same basic design. All SX-70 models feature a folding body design, a 4-element 116 mm f/8 glass lens, and an automatic exposure system known as the Electric Eye. The cameras allow for focusing as close as 10.4 inches (26 cm), and have a shutter speed range from 1/175 s to more than 10 seconds. The Model 3 departs from the other models in that it is not an SLR; instead, it has the viewfinder cut into the mirror hood.

A whole array of accessories could be used with SX-70 cameras, such as a close-up lens (1:1 @ 5 inches), an electric remote shutter release, a tripod mount, and an Ever-Ready carrying case that hung from the neck and unfolded in concert with the camera.

Much of the technology used in the folding SX-70 cameras was later used in the production of rigid "box"- type SX-70 cameras, such as the Model 1000 OneStep, Pronto, Presto, and The Button. These models, although also utilizing SX-70 film, are very different from the folding SLR SX-70s.

== Film ==
When the Polaroid SX-70 was introduced in 1972 it used a film pack of 10 film sheets where each film sheet had a size of 3.5 x 4.25 in^{2} with a picture area of 3.125 x 3.125 in^{2} and ASA film speed of 150. The film was a market success despite some problems with the batteries on early film packs. The original SX-70 film was improved once in the mid-1970s (New Improved Faster Developing!) and replaced in 1980 by the further advanced "SX-70 Time-Zero Supercolor" product, in which the layers in the film card were altered to allow a much faster development time (hence the "time zero"). It also had richer, brighter colors than the original 1972 product. There were also professional market varieties of the SX-70 film, including 778 (Time Zero equivalent) and the similar 708, Time Zero film without a battery, intended for use in applications such as the "Face Place" photo booth and professional or laboratory film-backs, where a battery is not needed. Time Zero was the film manufactured up until 2005, though overseas-market and some last-run film packs were marked only as SX-70.

A feature of the SX-70 film packs was a built-in battery to power the camera motors and exposure control, ensuring that a charged battery would always be available as long as film was in the camera. The "Polapulse" battery was configured as a 6-volt thin flat battery; it used zinc chloride chemistry to provide for the high pulse demand of the camera motors. Polaroid later released development kits to allow the Polapulse battery to be used in non-photographic applications. In the 1980s, the company even produced small "600" AM/FM radios that ran on film packs; once the film cards were exhausted, the battery still had enough power to be reused.

The Polaroid 600 series film, introduced in 1981, has the same film format and cartridge as that of the SX-70 but features a higher film speed at ISO 640. The 2-stop difference in sensitivity can be compensated in an SX-70 by using a ND-filter or through circuit modifications that change the exposure time.

=== Supply issues ===
Polaroid SX-70 "Time-Zero" film was phased out of production in late 2005 to early 2006 (differing according to regional markets).

After Polaroid ceased manufacturing all instant film in 2008, the Impossible Project (now known as Polaroid B.V. or simply Polaroid) began formulating replacements using equipment acquired when the original manufacturing facilities closed. In 2017, the Impossible Project rebranded as Polaroid Originals, joined the Polaroid Corporation and began selling SX-70 through Polaroid. Polaroid produces lines of black and white and color film compatible with the SX-70, though their films use a different chemistry than original Polaroid film and have different characteristics such as lower color quality, longer development times, and higher sensitivity to outside forces including light and pressure. Polaroid also makes film for 600 and newer "I-Type" cameras.

== Image manipulation ==
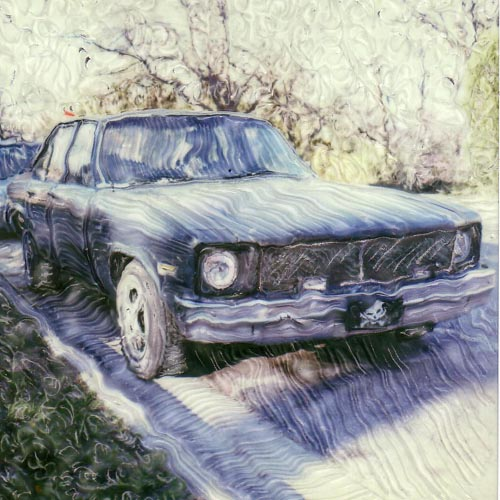
A manipulated photograph of a Chevy Nova

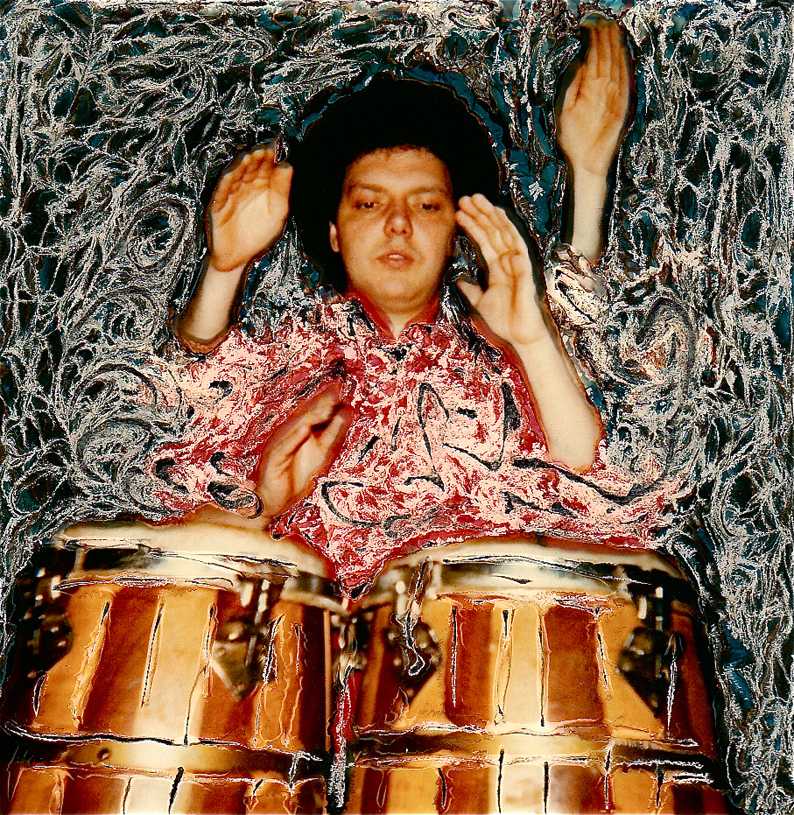
A manipulated photograph of Augusto De Luca

One feature of SX-70 integral print film is its ability to be manipulated during development and for some days afterward. Because the emulsion is gelatin-based, and the Mylar covering does not allow water vapor to readily pass, the emulsion stays soft for several days, allowing people to press and manipulate the emulsion to produce effects somewhat like impressionist paintings. An example of this technique appeared on the cover of Peter Gabriel's third self-titled album in 1980. Another example of emulsion manipulation was the cover of Loverboy's debut album, Loverboy.

Greek-American artist Lucas Samaras created a series of self-portraits titled "Photo-Transformations" (1973–1976), which employed extensive use of emulsion manipulation techniques.

In the 1980s in Italy, photographer Augusto De Luca used the same technique to create small portraits of artists, musicians, and photographers. His polaroids appeared to be a mix between photography and painting.

The 500, 600, and Spectra/Image materials do not use a gelatin-based emulsion and cannot be manipulated this way.

Manipulation of the photograph is best done about two minutes after the picture has fully developed. It will stay soft and workable for about 5–15 minutes. Some colors will be more difficult to work on (dark green), whereas others are workable for a long time (red). If the photograph is on a warm surface or has been slightly warmed in an oven, image manipulation becomes easier.

== Design history ==
Polaroid founder Edwin H. Land was the primary driver behind the project, and many engineers and designers made key contributions. The final styling of the product involved industrial designer Henry Dreyfuss and his firm.

== See also ==
- Instant camera
- James Gilbert Baker
- Mike Brodie
- Stefanie Schneider
- Lucas Samaras
