= Instant camera =

Self-developing film camera

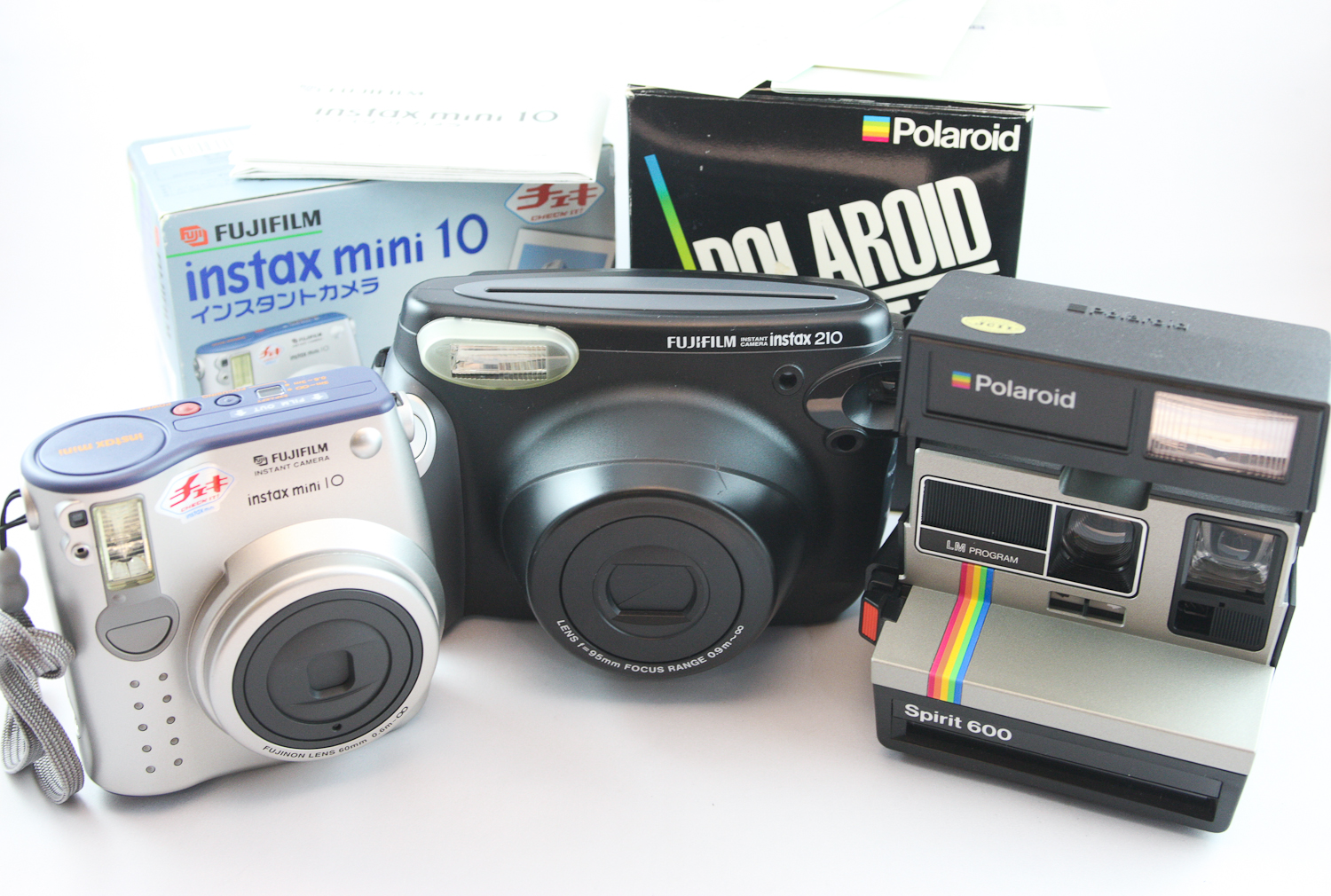
One Polaroid and two Fujifilm instant cameras with film

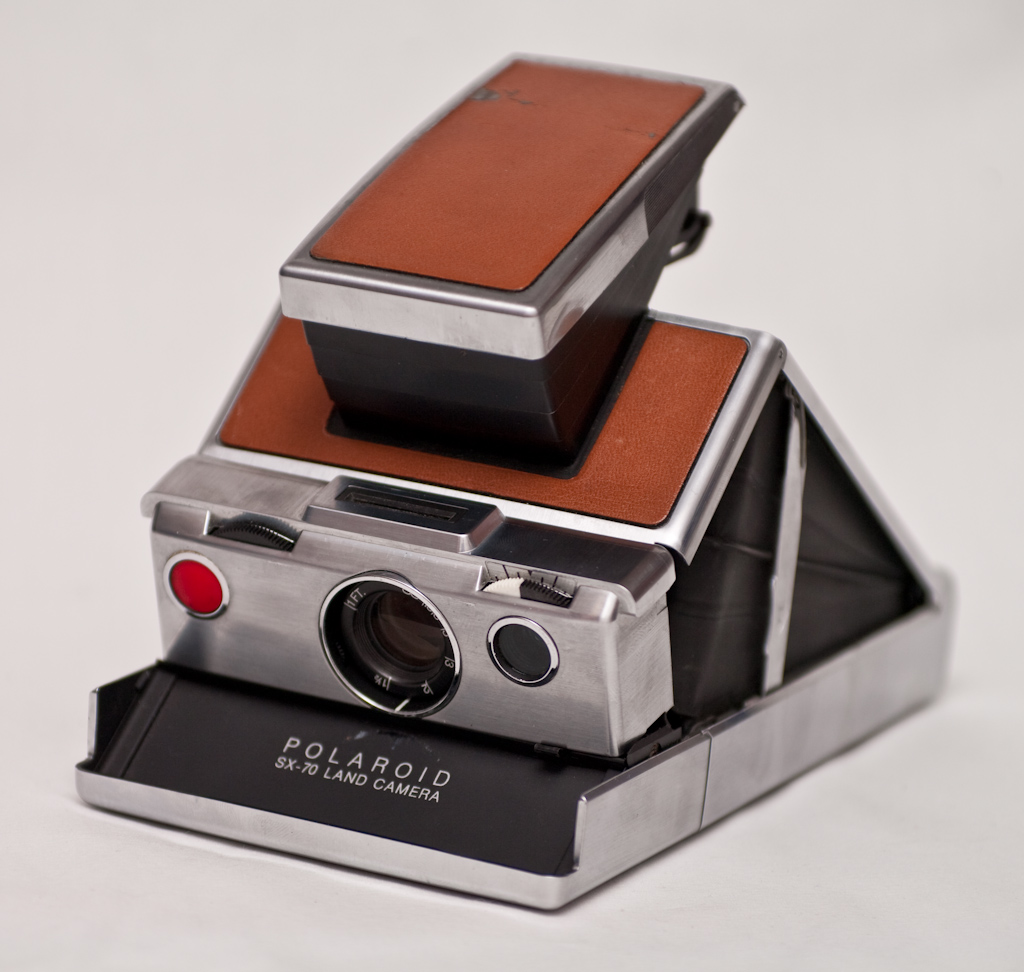
Polaroid SX-70

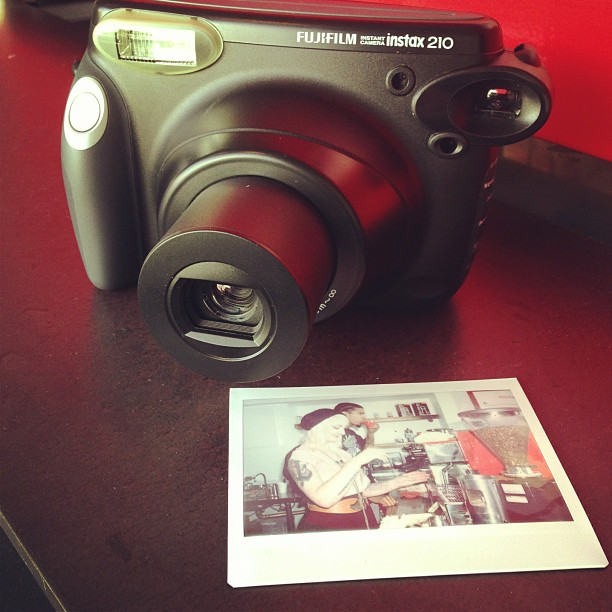
Fujifilm Instax 210 with instant photograph

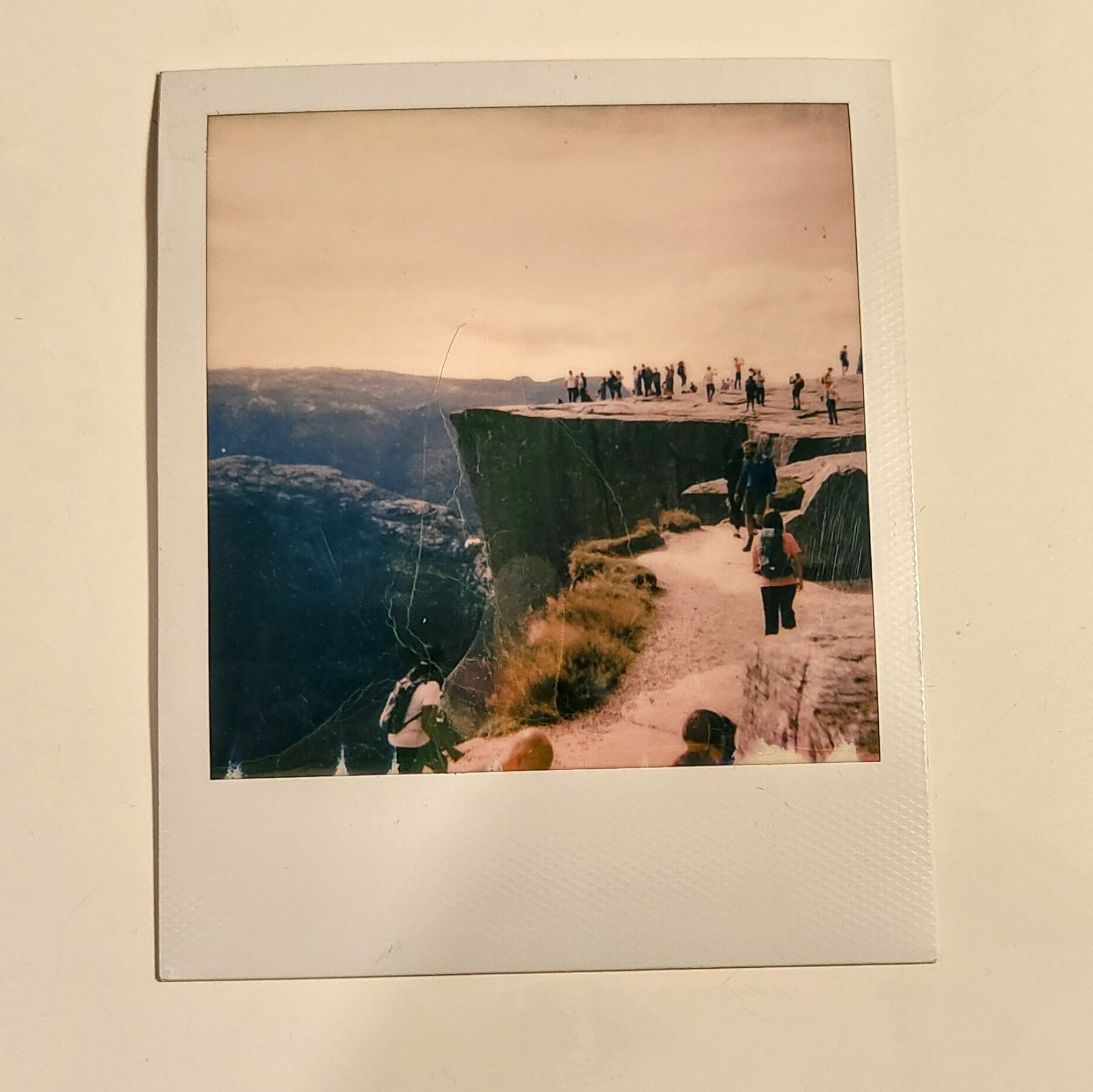
Image of a developed analog Polaroid Film depicting Preikestolen

An instant camera is a camera which uses self-developing film to create a chemically developed print shortly after taking the picture. Polaroid Corporation pioneered (and patented) consumer-friendly instant cameras and film, and were followed by various other manufacturers.

The invention of commercially viable instant cameras which were easy to use is generally credited to Edwin Land, the inventor of the model 95 Land Camera, widely considered the first commercial instant camera, in 1948, a year after he unveiled instant film in New York City.

In February 2008, Polaroid filed for Chapter 11 bankruptcy protection for the second time and announced it would discontinue production of its instant films and cameras, shut down three manufacturing facilities, and lay off 450 workers. Sales of analog film by all makers dropped by at least 25% per year in the first decade of the 21st century. In 2009, Polaroid was acquired by PLR IP Holdings LLC, which uses the Polaroid brand to market various products often relating to instant cameras. Among the products it markets are a Polaroid branded Fuji Instax instant camera, and various digital cameras and portable printers.

As of 2017, film continues to be made by Polaroid B.V. (previously the Impossible Project) for several models of Polaroid camera, and for the 8×10 inch format. Other brands such as Lomography, Leica, Fujifilm, and others have designed new models and features in their own takes on instant cameras.

== Cameras and film ==
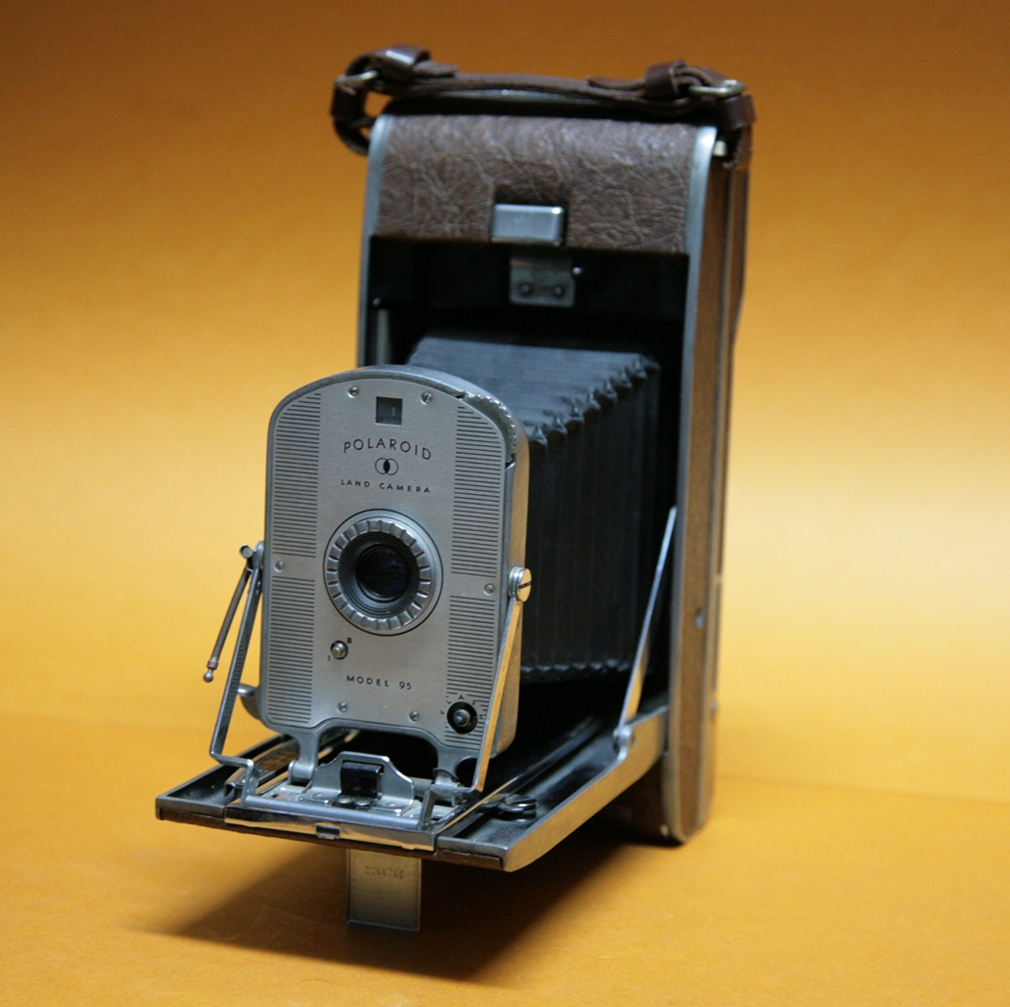
Polaroid Model 95, the company's first instant camera introduced in 1948

Many different models of Polaroid and non-Polaroid instant cameras were introduced in the mid to late 20th century. They can be categorized by the film type.

=== Roll film ===
The first roll film camera was the Polaroid Model 95, followed by subsequent models containing various new features. Roll film came in two rolls (positive/developing agent and negative) which were loaded into the camera and was eventually offered in three sizes (40, 30, and 20 series).

=== Pack film ===
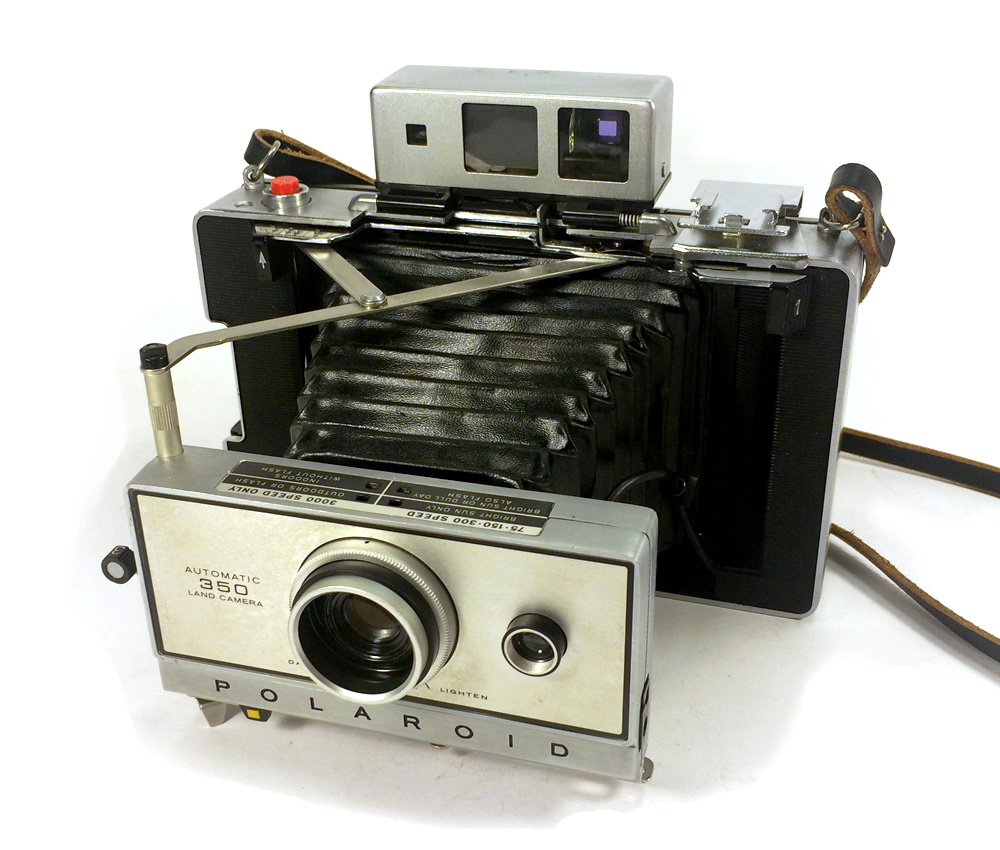
Polaroid Automatic 350, made from 1969 to 1971

The first 100 series pack film model was the model 100, followed by various models in the 100 - 400 series and a few ad hoc cameras such as the countdown series. The next generation of Polaroid cameras used 100 series "pack film," where the photographer pulled the film out of the camera, then peeled apart the positive from the negative at the end of the developing process. Pack film initially was offered in a rectangular format (100 series), then in square format (80 series).

=== Integral film ===
Models which used SX-70 film were introduced in a folding version, with later versions being solid plastic bodied. Third generation Polaroids, like the once popular SX-70, used a square format integral film, in which all components of the film (negative, developer, fixer, etc.) were contained. The SX-70 instant camera used the print technology that Edwin Land had most desired. It introduced the use of more efficient print technology that developed more instantly than previous film types offered, which cut out some of the user's responsibility and made it easier to use. Each exposure developed automatically once the shot was taken. SX-70 (or Time Zero) film had a strong following with artists who used it for image manipulation. 600 series cameras such as the Pronto, Sun 600, and One600 used 600 type film which was four times faster than SX-70 film. 600 series cameras were almost all plastic bodied, except for the SLR 680 and 690 models, which resembled SX-70 type cameras, but most came with an electronic flash.

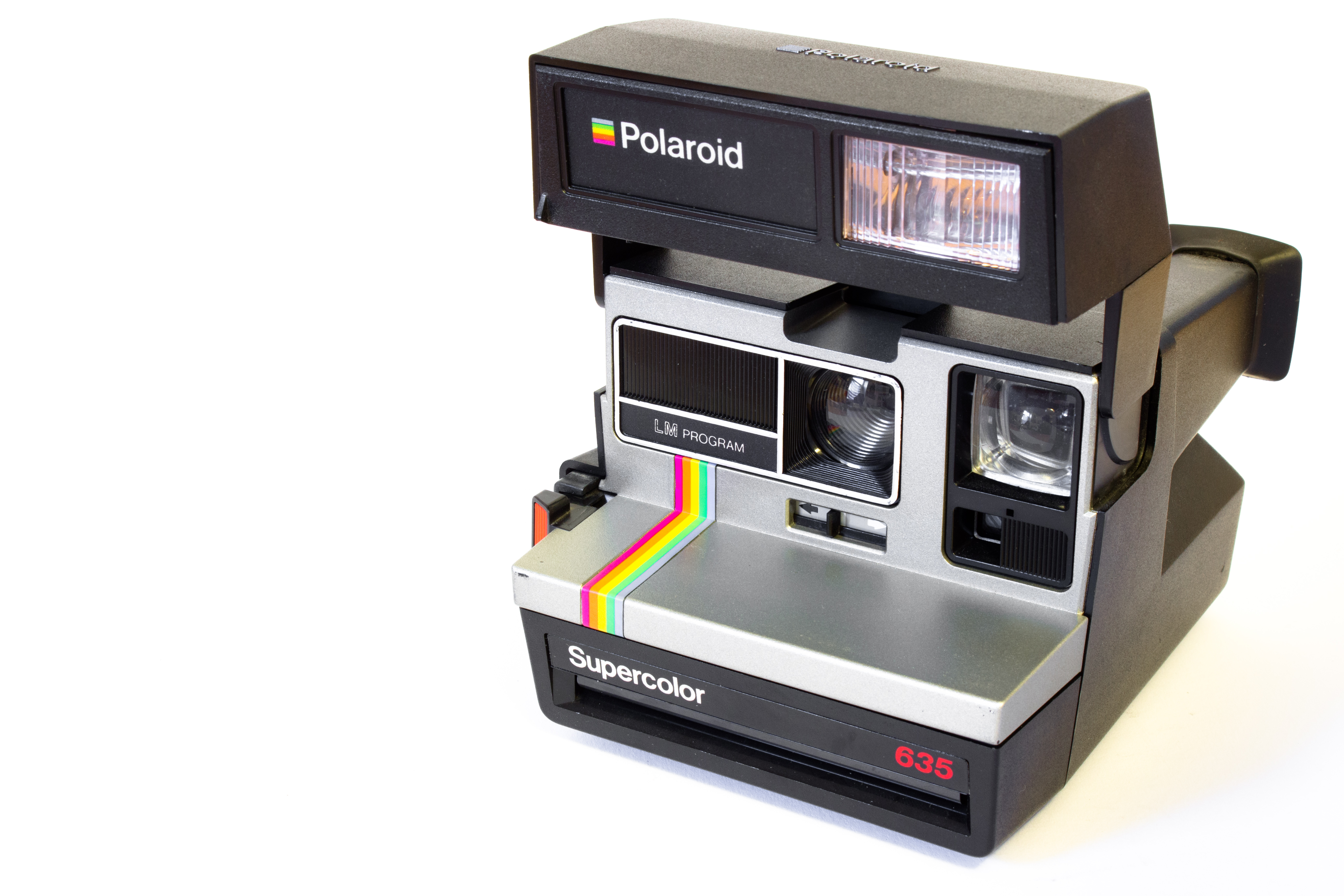
Polaroid 635 Supercolor

=== Spectra, Captiva, and i-Zone film ===
This was followed by other various plastic cameras based on Spectra, Captiva, and i-Zone film. Polaroid Spectra cameras used Polaroid Spectra film which went back to a rectangular format. Captiva, Joycam, and Popshots (single use) cameras used a smaller 500 series film in rectangular format. i-Zone cameras use a very small film format which was offered in a sticker format. Finally, Mio cameras used Polaroid Mio film which was Fuji Instax mini, branded as Polaroid and which is still available in 2015 as Fuji Instax Mini. This size produces a billfold-sized photo. Polaroid still markets a mini format camera built by Fuji branded as Polaroid 300 and the film is available with both the Polaroid name and as Fuji Instax mini which are interchangeable.

== Polaroid instant movie cameras ==
Polaroid also invented and manufactured an instant movie camera system called Polavision. The kit included a camera, film, and a movie viewer. When the movie was shot, it would be taken out of the camera and then inserted into the viewer for development, then viewed after development. This format was close to Super 8 mm film. Polavision film was different from normal film in that it was an additive film, mixing the primary colors (red, green, blue) to form the color image. The biggest disadvantage of the Polavision system was the low film speed (ASA 40), which resulted in having to use very bright lights when taking the movie, as well as requiring a special player to view the developed movie. It also lacked audio capability. Because of this, and combined with the advent of VHS video recorders, Polavision had a short history.

== Types of non-Polaroid instant cameras ==
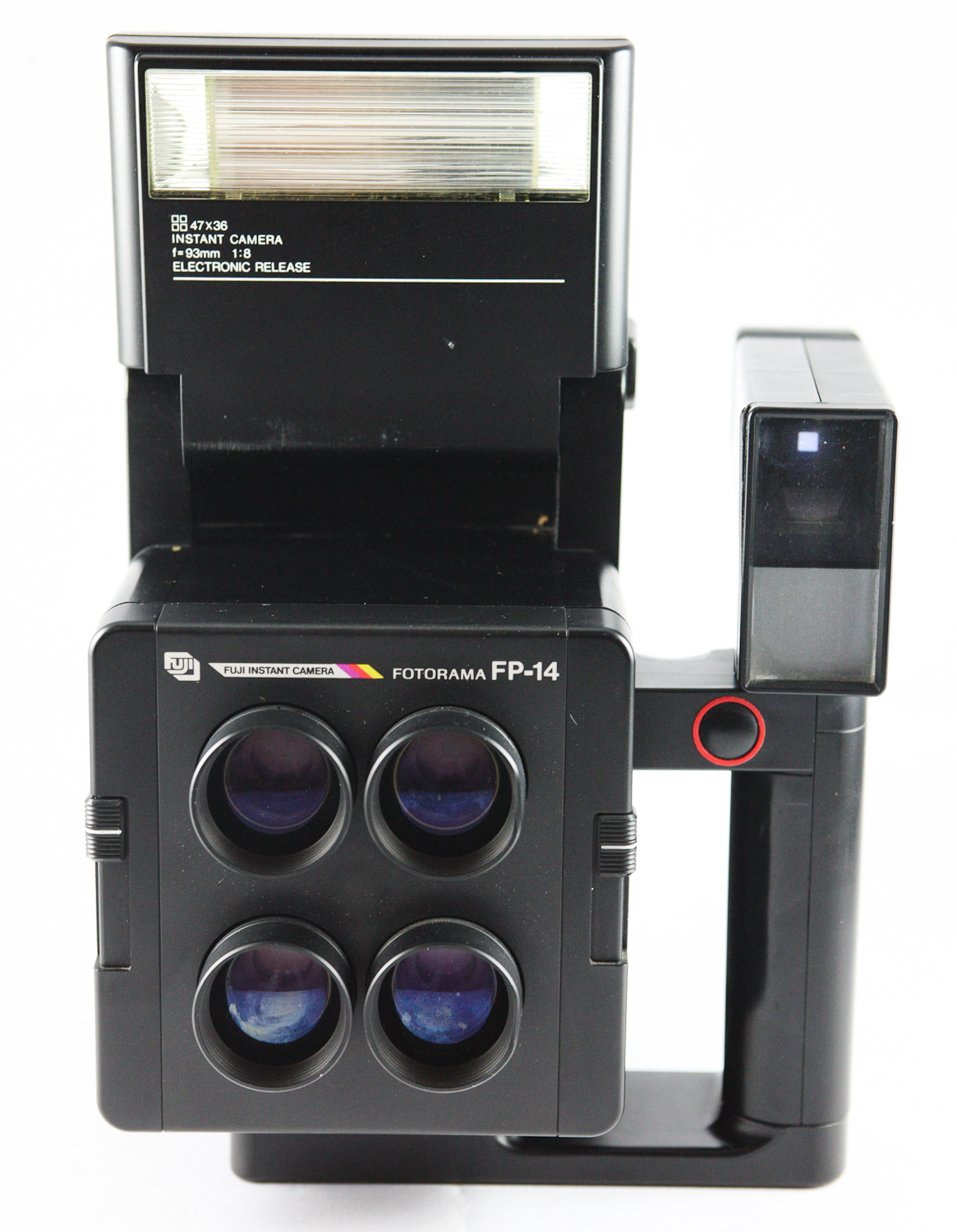
Fujifilm FP-14, a passport camera intended to produce four photo portraits of the same subject simultaneously

The earliest instant cameras were conceived before Edwin Land's invention of the instant camera. These cameras were, however, more portable wet darkrooms than "instant" camera and were difficult to use.

After Land's instant camera invention was brought to market in 1948, a few different instant cameras were developed, some using Polaroid-compatible film such as cameras by Keystone, Konica, and Minolta. Others were incompatible with Polaroid cameras and film, the most notable of these being made by Kodak, such as the EK series and Kodamatic cameras.

Later, Fujifilm introduced instant cameras and film in selected markets. After taking over an old Polaroid factory in 2008, the Netherlands-based Impossible Project began producing instant film for Polaroid cameras. This helped generate new interest in instant photography.

=== Kodak ===
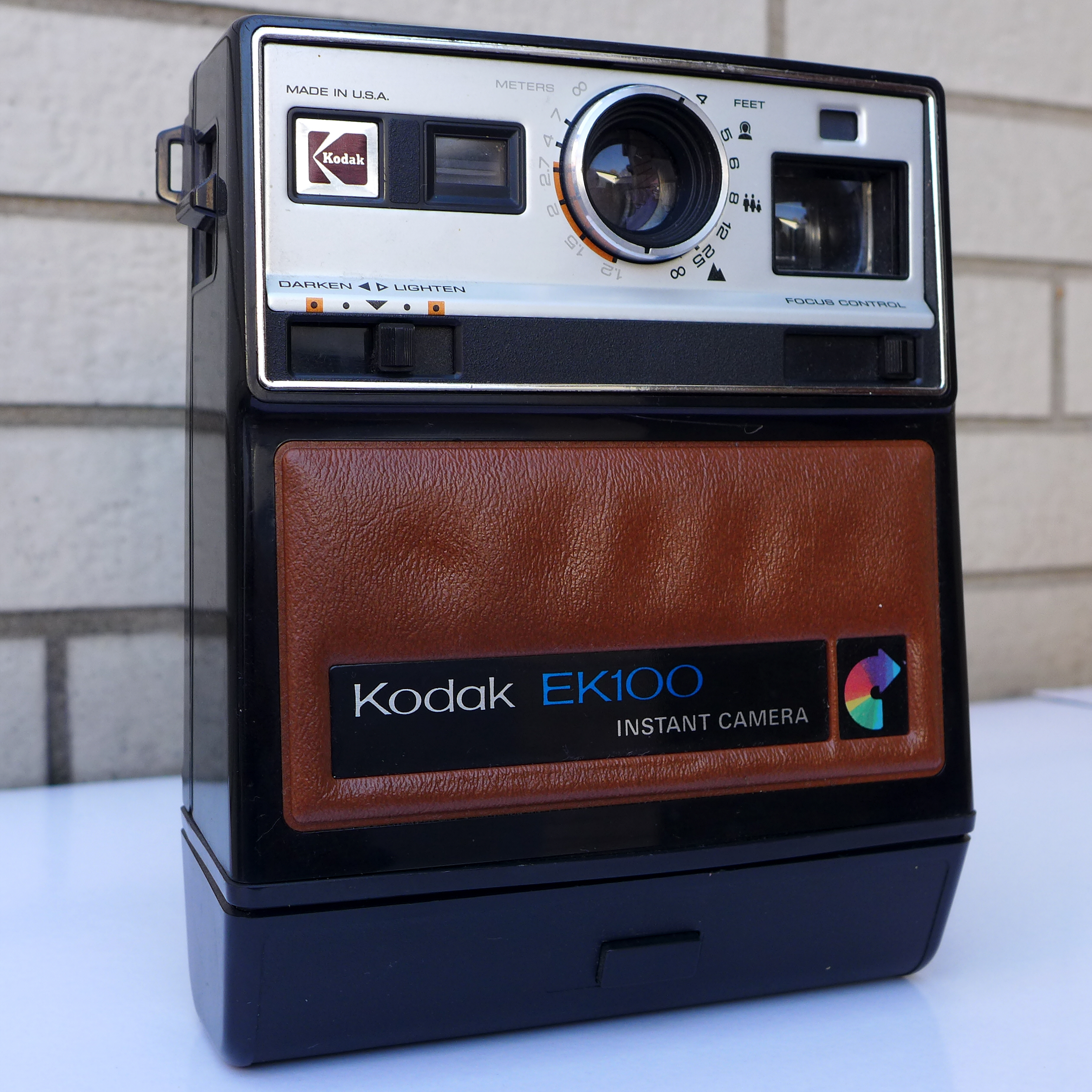
Kodak EK100

Kodak's EK and Kodamatic series cameras were introduced in 1976, and accepted a Kodak developed integral instant film, similar to but incompatible with Polaroid's SX-70 film. The film was chemically similar to Polaroid's with the exception that the negative was exposed from the rear and the dye/developers diffused to the front of the photograph. This alleviated the need for a mirror to reverse the image before it struck the negative.

Even so, Polaroid brought a patent-infringement lawsuit against Kodak, and eventually Kodak was forced to stop manufacture of both the camera and film. Kodak was also left to pay a settlement to some customers who were left without a way to use their now defunct cameras. One settlement offered owners of Kodak instant cameras a credit towards a new Kodak camera. Many Kodak instant cameras still exist and can be found on auction sites. Kodak also lost the contract to manufacture Polaroid's negatives which subsequently took production in house. Recently photographers tried to use Instax mini and square film inside the Kodak EK4 being somewhat successful and only being able to load one picture at a time in a darkroom.

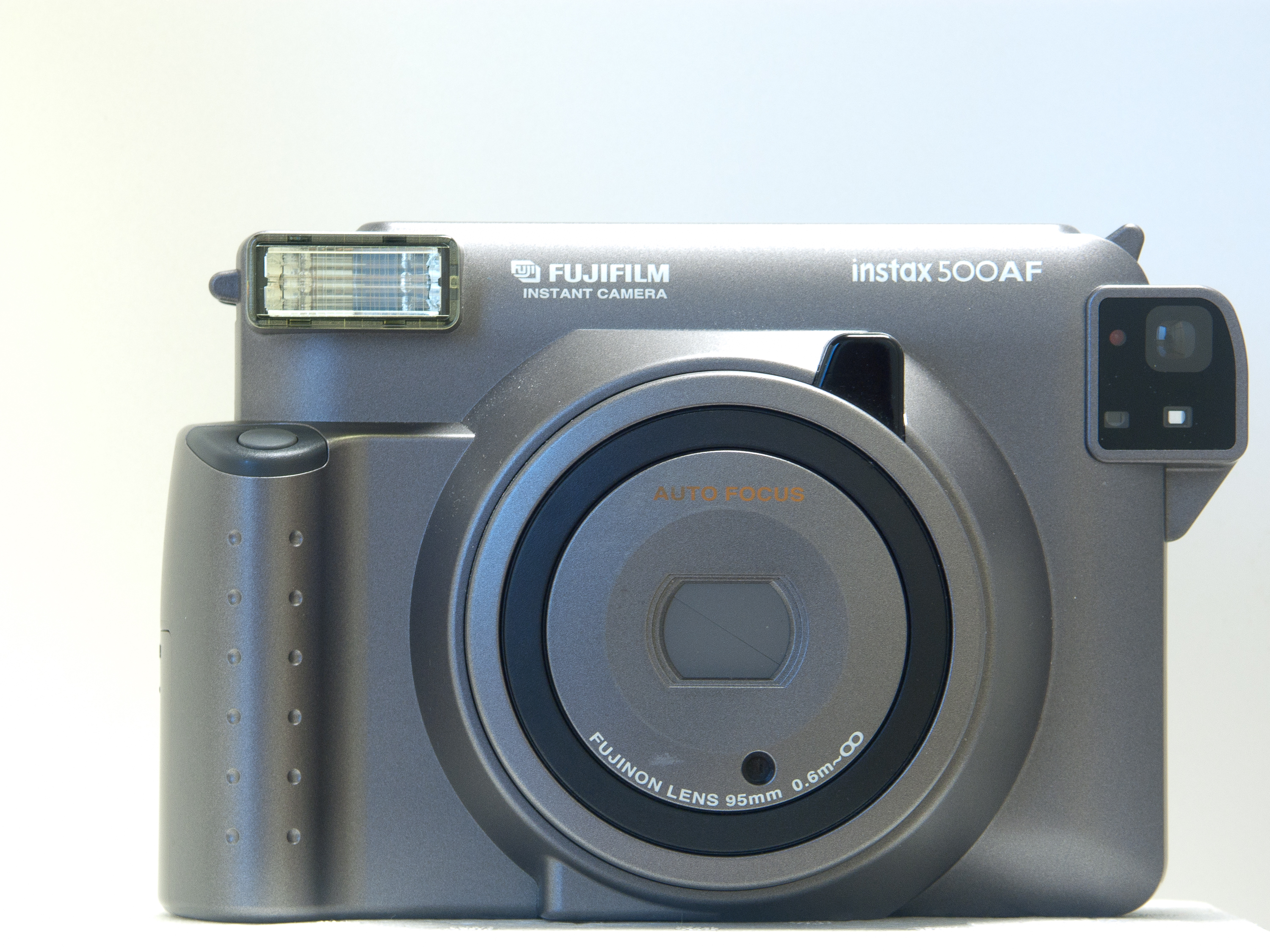
Fujifilm Instax 500AF camera

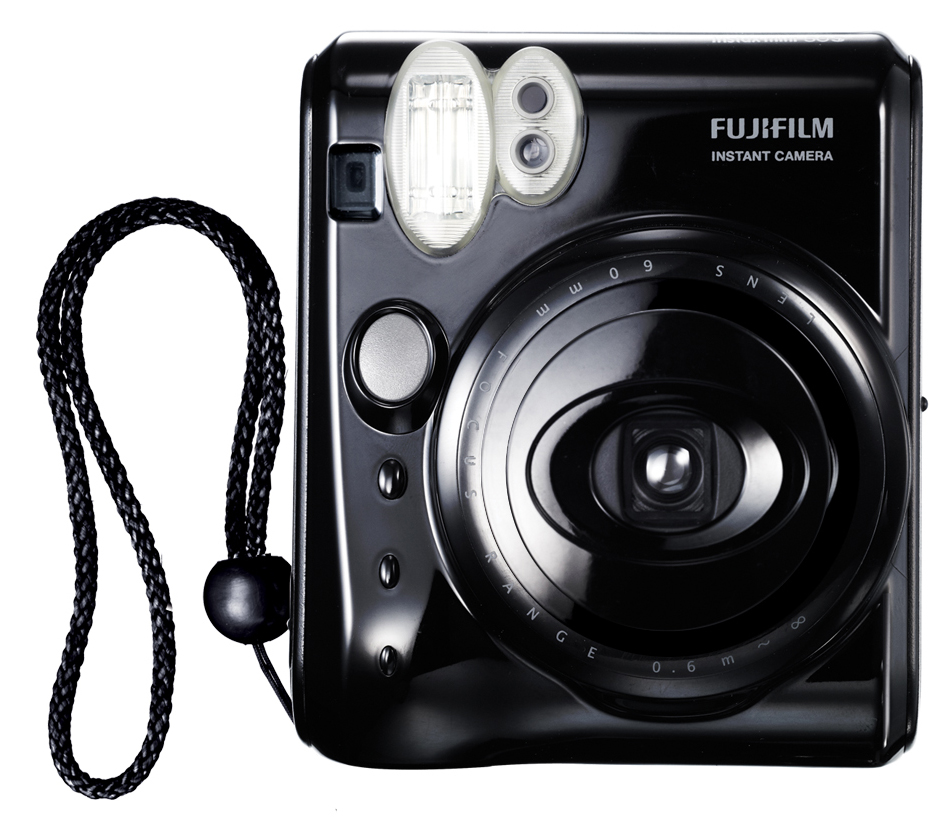
Fujifilm Instax Mini 50S camera

=== Fujifilm ===
In more recent years, Fujifilm introduced a line of instant cameras and film in Japanese and Asian markets. Fujifilm called their instant camera line Fotorama. Starting in the early 1980s the F series of cameras include the F-10, F-50S and F-62AF. In the mid-1980s it introduced the 800 series with models such as the MX800, 850E, and Mr Handy collapsible. The ACE cameras were introduced in the mid-1990s with film identical to the 800 film but with a different cartridge. The integral films are based on the Kodak line of instant camera films. The instant films FI-10/PI-800/ACE series are somewhat compatible with the Kodak line of instant cameras, with minor modifications to the cartridge to make it fit. The F series film was discontinued in 1994 but similar modifications on more recent Instax film can be made to fit in the older cartridges.

Fujifilm was one of the first manufacturers who added different shooting modes to Polaroid cameras. "Kid mode" for example, will shoot photos at a faster shutter speed for capturing fast moving objects or people. Fujifilm later introduced Instax Mini 8 and advertised as the "cutest camera" targeting young women and girls. Shortly after, they introduced Instax Mini 90 and Instax mini 70, Targeting middle-aged men with the new sleek and classic design.

In the late 1990s Fujifilm introduced a new series of cameras using a new film called Instax. It was available in markets outside the US. Instax became available in a smaller size with the introduction of the Instax Mini/Cheki line. Polaroid's Mio was available in the US, it uses the same film as the Fujifilm Instax Mini series but were rebranded as Mio film. This was also true of the Polaroid 300, and this film is still being sold. None of Fujifilm's products were sold officially in the United States originally. With the announcement in 2008 of Polaroid ceasing film production, Instax and peel apart type films became available in more channels. Fuji ended production of peel-apart films in 2016, FP-100C being the last such product from them.

=== MiNT Camera ===
In 2015, MiNT Camera released the InstantFlex TL70, a vintage twin-lens reflex-looking instant camera that used Fuji Instax Mini film.

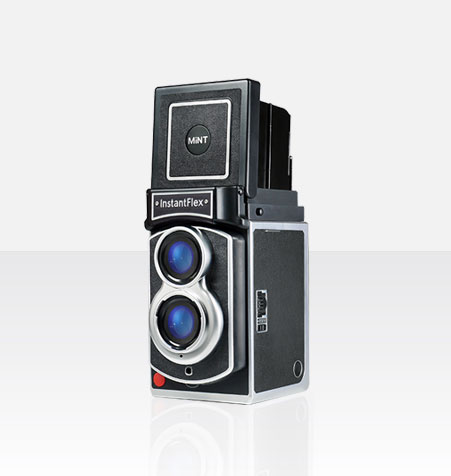
MiNT Instantflex TL70

In 2016, it launched the SLR670-S. It has the look of a Polaroid SX-70, but with an ISO 640 system and manual shutter options. These are built from vintage cameras with new electronics.

In 2019, it introduced the InstantKon RF70, a rangefinder camera that uses Fuji instax wide film. Two years later in 2021, it introduced another rangefinder camera, the InstantKon SF70, that uses Fuji instax square film.

=== Lomography ===
In 2014, Lomography funded the creation of a new instant camera, the Lomo'Instant, by raising over US$1,000,000 on Kickstarter. Like Fujifilm's Instax Mini camera, the Lomo'Instant uses Instax Mini film.

The following year, the company released the Lomo'Instant Wide, a variation on the original Lomo'Instant which shot larger photos using Fujifilm's Instax Wide film. These images are more similar in size to original Polaroid film.

In the summer of 2016, Lomography announced the development of a new instant camera. Called the Lomo'Instant Automat, Lomography describes it as "the most advanced automatic instant camera.”

In August 2017, Lomography released the Lomo'Instant Square Glass. It takes 86mm x 72mm photographs and is the "world's first dual-format, glass lensed instant camera".

== Applications ==
Instant cameras have found many uses throughout their history. The original purpose of instant cameras was motivated by Jennifer Land's question to her father (Edwin Land): "Why can't I see them now?" Many people have enjoyed seeing their photos shortly after taking them, allowing them to recompose or retake the photo if they didn't get it right. But instant cameras were found to be useful for other purposes such as ID cards, passport photos, ultrasound photos, and other uses which required an instant photo. They were also used by police officers and fire investigators because of their ability to create an unalterable instant photo. Medium and large format professional photographers have also used the higher end instant cameras to preview lighting before taking the more expensive medium and/or large format photo. Instant film also has been used in ways that are similar to folk art, including the transfer of the images/emulsion and image manipulation.

Script supervisors in film production used instant cameras (until superseded by digital cameras) as standard to aid visual continuity by photographing actors, sets or props, to take photographs that could be instantly referred to when a particular set or character's appearance needs to be reset and shot again, or recalled later due to reshoots or the out-of-sequence shooting schedule of a film or television production.

The fashion industry relied upon Polaroid prints as a record of models or potential models.

Instant photography was also useful in conducting a study about the perception of vehicle accidents. The instant photos were used to document accidents to show medical professionals the condition of a vehicle after an accident. Having this visual in turn changed how the physician viewed the accident their patient was in.

With the advent of digital photography, much of the instant camera's consumer appeal has been transferred to digital cameras. Passport photo cameras have gone to digital, leaving instant cameras to a niche market.

Instant Cameras and Society

The introduction of instant camera technologies was important to society because it allowed for more creativity among camera users. Instead of having to use a darkroom to develop photographs, users were able to explore and document their world and experiences as they occurred. Instant Camera photography acted as an activity to some of its users. Instant cameras were portrayed by Polaroid as being able to combine the activities of both taking a photo and viewing one, into a singular past time.

Because instant cameras were easy to use, didn't require a darkroom or sending out the film for processing, this allowed couples to take personal private photos without concerns about unwanted third parties viewing the photos.

== Taking an instant photograph ==
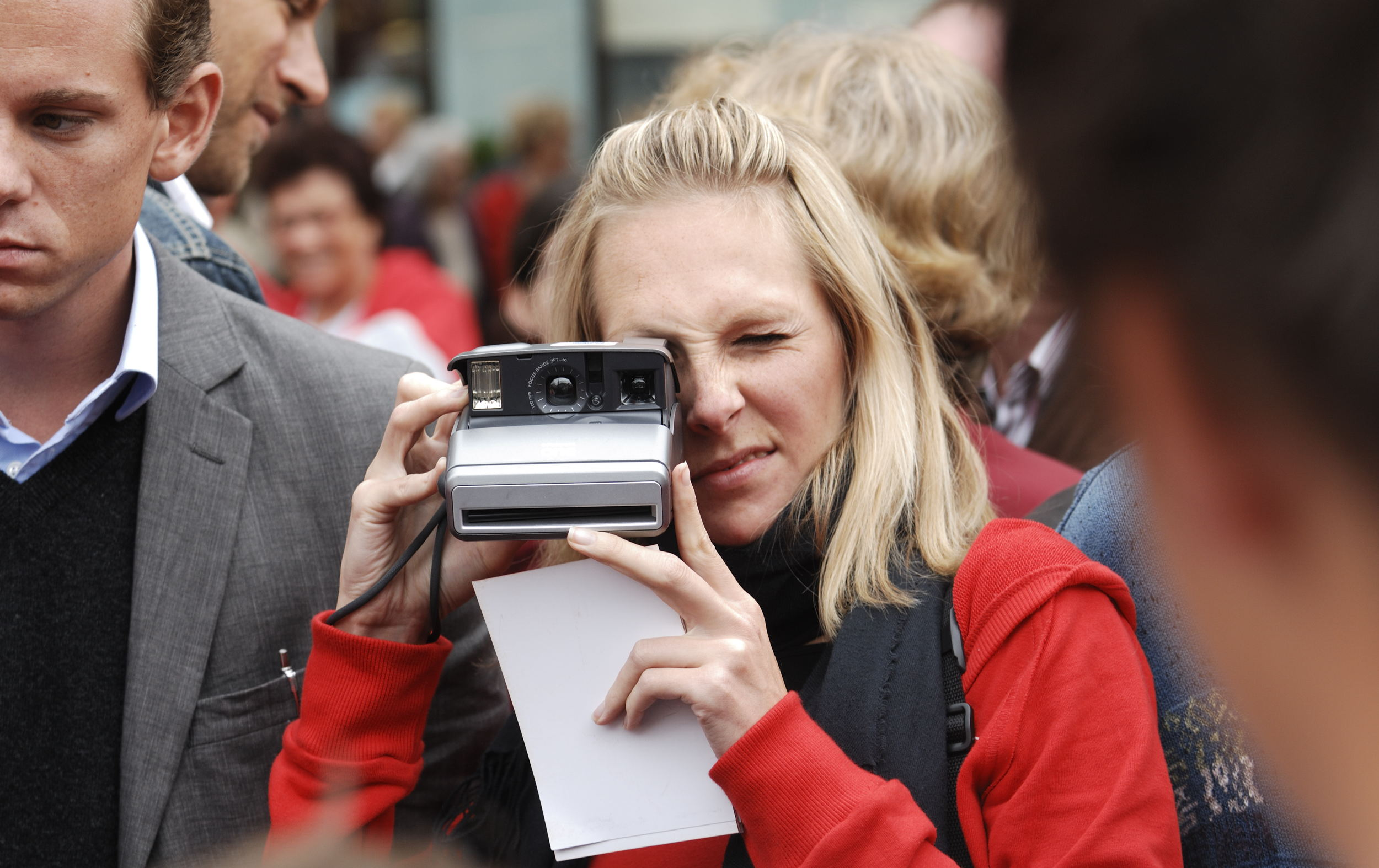
Using an instant camera

Edwin Land's original idea behind instant photography was to create a photographic system that was seamless and easy for anyone to use. The first roll film instant cameras required the photographer to use a light meter to take a reading of the light level, then to set the exposure setting on the lens. Then the lens was focused and the subject framed and the picture was taken. The photographer flipped a switch and pulled the large tab in the back of the camera to pull the negative over the positive, through some rollers to spread the developing agent. After the picture developed inside the camera for the required time, the photographer opened the small door in the camera back and peeled the positive from the negative. To prevent fading, the black and white positive had to be coated with a fixing agent, a potentially messy procedure which led to the development of coaterless instant pack film.

Pack film cameras were mostly equipped with automatic exposure, but still had to be focused and a flash bulb or cube unit needed to be used with colour film indoors. The development of the film required the photographer pull two tabs, the second tab which pulled the positive/negative "sandwich" from the camera, where it developed outside the camera. If the temperature was below 15 °C (60 °F), the positive/negative "sandwich" was placed between two aluminum plates and placed either in the user's pocket or under their arm to keep it warm while developing. After the required development time (15 seconds to 2 minutes), the positive (with the latent image) was peeled apart from the negative.

Integral film cameras, such as the SX-70, 600 series, Spectra, and Captiva cameras went a long way in accomplishing Edwin Land's goal of creating a seamless process in producing instant photos. The photographer simply pointed the camera at the subject, framed it and took the photo. The camera and film did the rest, including adjusting the exposure settings, taking care of focusing (Sonar autofocus models only), utilising a flash if necessary (600 series and up), and ejecting the film, which developed without intervention from the photographer. The new design of the frame film for the SX-70 cameras allowed for their convenient usage. With all of the ingredients necessary to develop the photograph in the thicker portion of the frame, the user only has to take the photo to initiate the reaction which provided them their photo.

== Creative techniques ==
Due to the way that instant film develops, several techniques to modify or distort the final image exist, which were utilized by many artists. The three main techniques used are SX-70 manipulation, emulsion lift, and image transfer. SX-70 manipulation is used with SX-70 Time Zero film and it allows the photographer to draw on or distort an image by applying pressure to it while it is developing. With an emulsion lift, it is possible to separate the image from the medium it developed on, and transfer it to a different one. Image transfers are used with peel-apart film, like packfilm, to develop the instant image into a different material by peeling the picture too early and adhering the negative onto the desired material. Polaroid encouraged the use of these techniques by producing videos about them.

The artist Lucas Samaras, for example, was among the first to modify the images taken with the Polaroid SX-70 through the "Polaroid transfer". Thus, he developed the series "autoentrevistas", a set of self-portraits in which he takes the place of a model in different circumstances.

John Reuter, the director of the Polaroid 20×24 camera studio, for years experimented with snapshot transfers.

Andy Warhol also made use of instant cameras. Warhol began taking snapshots to use as sketches of his popular lithographs. Their peculiar look and the passage of time have turned these Polaroids into a significant part of pop art and pop culture.

David Hockney also utilised Polaroids within his work to create photo collages. Hockney was skeptical about photography, until instant photography was suggested to him by a museum curator. In the 1980s he began to experiment and creating composite photo collages. These include portraits, still lifes and the iconic swimming pools that Hockney is known for. He admitted that his works are very Cubist and often reference Synthetic Cubism with their distorted perspective. He later moved on from Polaroids to 35mm film.

== In popular culture ==
Polaroid pictures are used extensively in the film Memento.

The popular 2003 song "Hey Ya!" by Outkast features the line "Shake it like a Polaroid picture", referring to the myth that shaking an instant photo makes it dry faster. In reality, shaking has no positive effect and can even damage the photo. As a result of the song, the Polaroid Corporation released a statement discouraging the practice.

The name and app icon of the social photo sharing platform Instagram, founded in 2010, originated from the instant camera, with the 2010 icon directly resembling a Polaroid Land Camera 1000.

In 2014, American singer-songwriter Taylor Swift used Polaroids as the aesthetic for her fifth studio album 1989.
