= Polavision =

Color home movie system by Polaroid

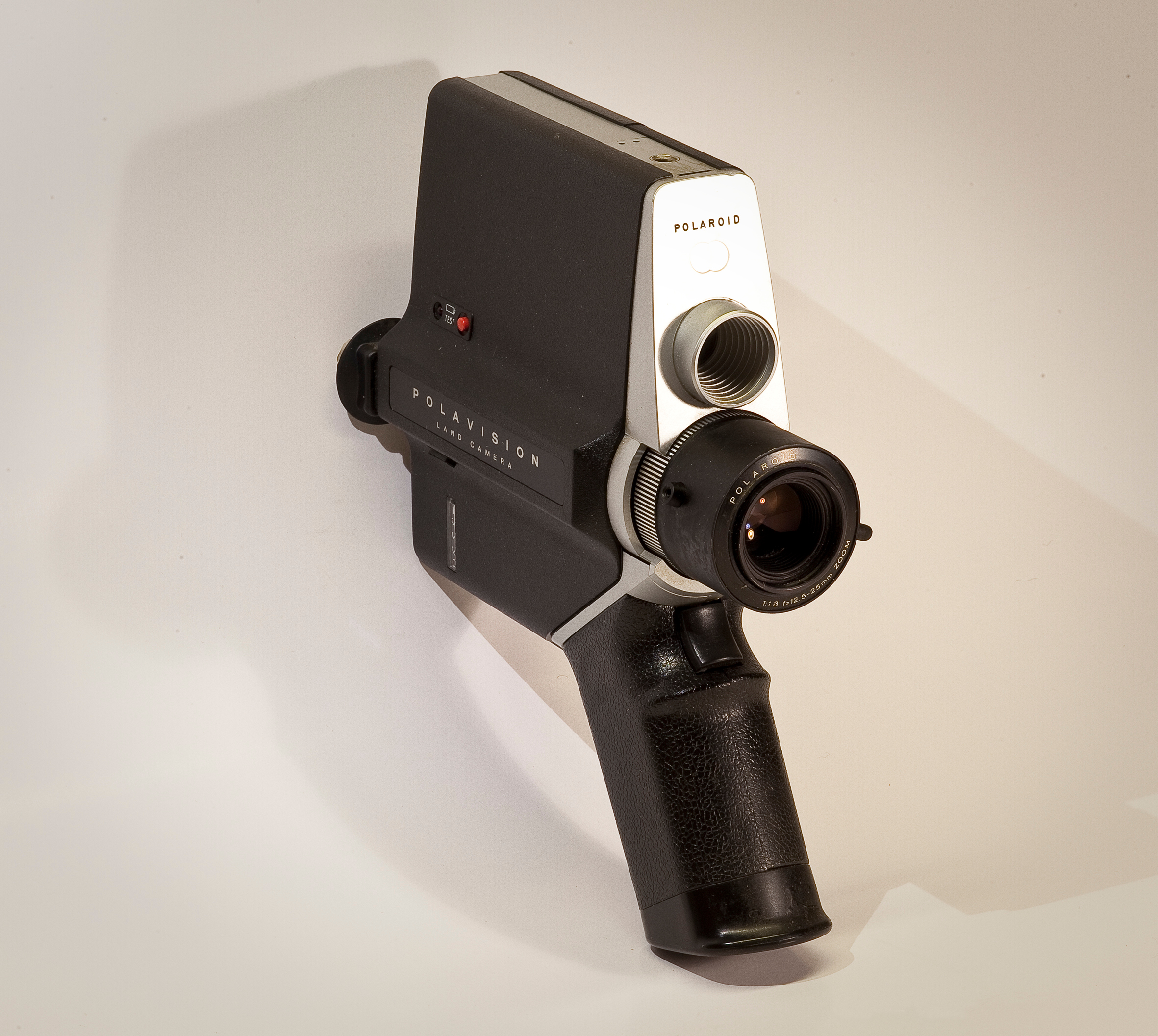
Polavision Land Camera

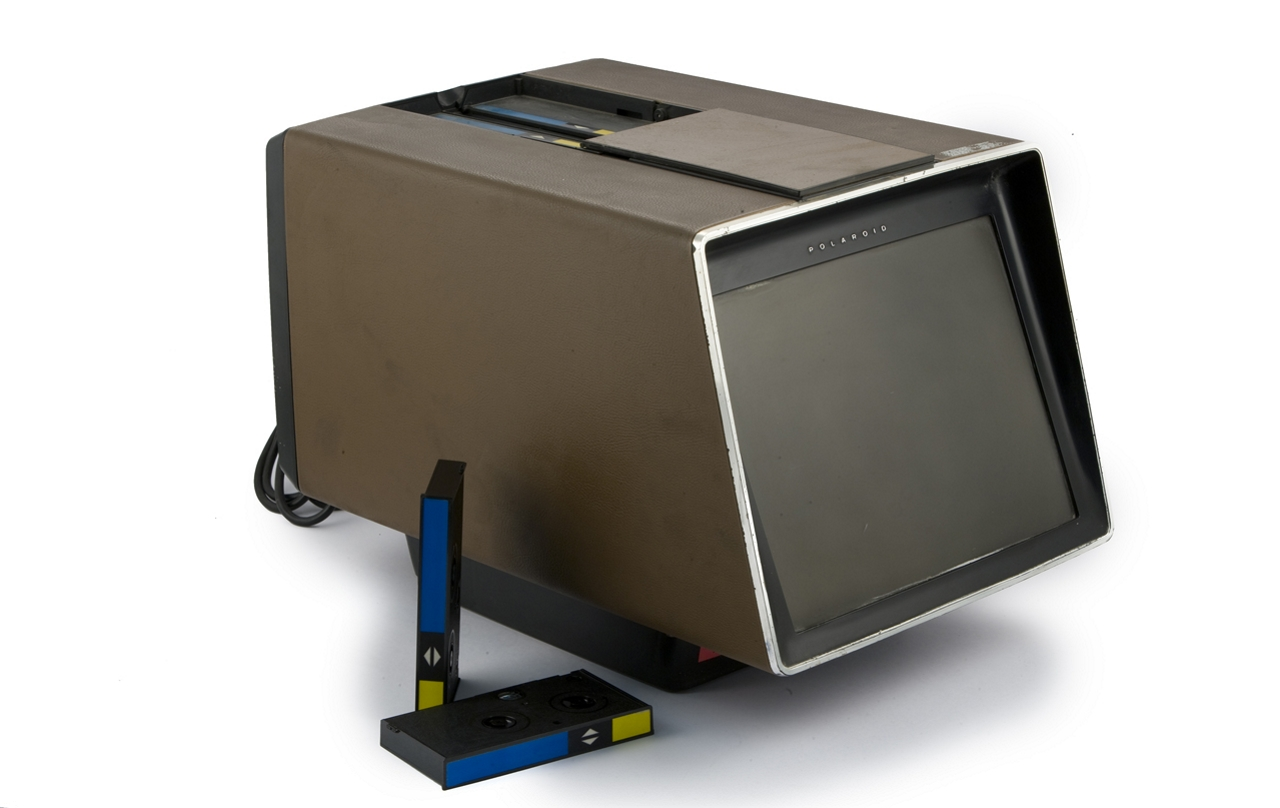
Polavision Player and cassettes

Polavision was an "instant" color home movie system launched by Polaroid in 1977.

== Technology ==
Unlike other motion picture film stock of the time, Polavision film reproduces color by the additive method, like the much earlier Dufaycolor film. In essence, it consists of a black-and-white emulsion on a film base covered with microscopically narrow red, green and blue filter stripes. It was instant in the sense that it could be very quickly and easily developed in the Polavision processing unit after it was removed from the Polavision camera, ready for viewing in only a few minutes.

The Polavision cartridge called Photo tape cassette is a small rectangular box containing the film reels and a prism letting in light for projection through a film gate. The film format is similar to the super 8 mm format, but without the Polavision tabletop viewer the only way a Polavision film can be shown is by destroying the cartridge and projecting the removed film with an ordinary super 8 mm projector or transferring it to video with a telecine system.

The Polavision system was a major commercial failure, and was discontinued in 1979. However, the underlying technology was improved and used as the basis for the Polachrome instant color transparency system introduced in 1983.

== Problems and commercial failure ==
Due to the light loss caused by the filtering layer, which allows only red, green or blue light to pass through any given point on it, the film had relatively low light sensitivity (40 ASA) and the developed footage has an overall veil that appears to be a neutral gray. The system features a standalone tabletop viewer designed to minimize the problems inherent in projecting such dense film. Somewhat resembling a small television, it projects the inserted film cartridge onto its translucent screen from behind, but critics from publications like Consumer Reports called the images "murky and dark". Despite this (or perhaps because of it), the format was used by artists, including Charles and Ray Eames, Stan Brakhage and Andy Warhol.

One market niche Polaroid promoted was the field of industrial testing, where the camera would record, for example, the destruction of a pipe under pressure. This type of use was moderately price-insensitive, with the ability to get the images quickly (thus reducing wasted crew time) a very positive selling feature.

The system was late to market and had to compete with upcoming Betamax and VHS videocassette-based systems, which in the pre-camcorder era of the late 1970s had the disadvantages of much greater bulk and much higher initial hardware cost. However, a standard videocassette ran for at least an hour at the highest-quality speed, while a Polavision cartridge contained less than three minutes of film, at a far higher per-minute cost than the finest videocassette tape. It could not be erased and reused, or shown on a real television set with a larger screen, and there was no sound. Polavision proved to be an expensive failure, and most of the manufactured equipment was sold off in 1979 as a job lot at a loss of $68.5 million. In the wake of those losses, Polaroid chairman and founder Edwin H. Land resigned the chief executive position in 1980 and left the company two years later.

Former Polaroid freelancer Paul Giambarba remarked,

I tried using the product but it was obviously a turkey compared to anything I was using that Kodak offered [...] Instant movie film was an engineering achievement but it's precisely what separated Polaroid techies from Polaroid pragmatists. There just weren't enough customers out there on whom to work the magic.

== Polavision screenings ==
Polavision film is rarely screened in public, but it has happened, at such venues as Anthology Film Archives (in 1998 and 2007), the Blinding Light! in Vancouver, and the Robert Beck Memorial Cinema at Collective: Unconscious. Video transfers of Andy Warhol's footage have been shown at the Andy Warhol Museum in Pittsburgh, and at the San Francisco Lesbian & Gay Film Festival in 2001.

== Line up ==
=== Polaroid Corp. ===
- Polavision Land Camera 3600 (1977-1980) 171,000 PCS sold
- Polavision Twi Light N7071 (1977-1980)
- Polavision Player (1977-1980?) 215,000 PCS sold- Processor / Tabletop viewer with Remote
- Photo tape cassette type 608 (1977-1980?) - 11.8m(38.5 feet) / 2'35" / ASA40(17°DIN) / Daylight Color
- Photo tape cassette type 617 (1980-1988) - 11.8m(38.5 feet) / ASA125(22°DIN) / Black & White for Analysis
- Photo tape cassette type 618 (1980-1988) - 11.8m(38.5 feet) / 2'35" / ASA40(17°DIN) / Tungsten Color

=== Mekel Engineering Inc. ===
- Mekel 300 Instant Analysis Camera (1985-?) - 300fps High speed camera (max 10 sec./cassette)

== Polachrome and other 35 mm films ==
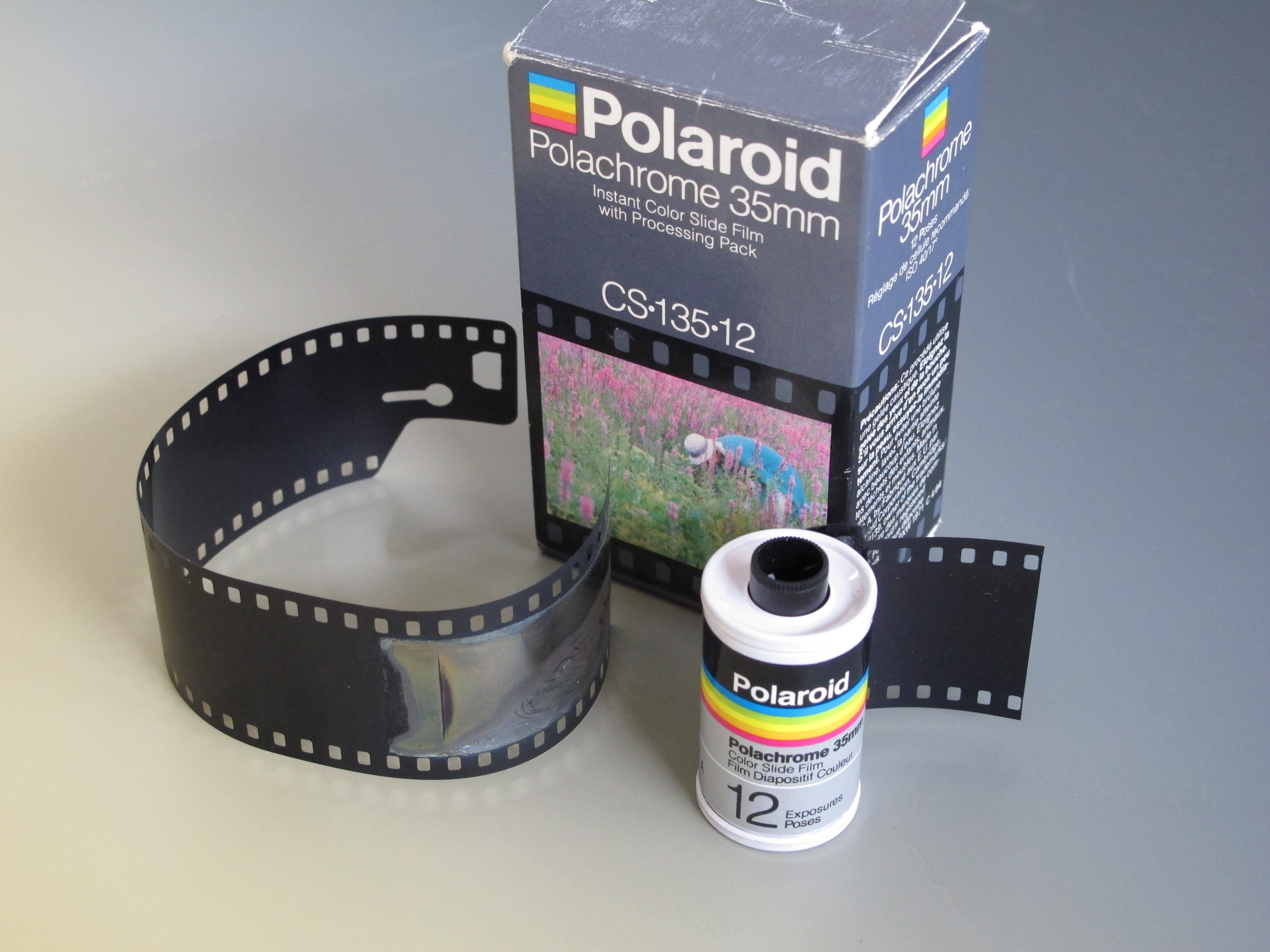
Polachrome film in 135 cartridge and processing pack case.

In 1983, Polaroid introduced an "instant" transparency (slide film) system for still photography. Each roll of 35 mm film came with its own small packet of processing chemistry. After exposure, the film and its packet were loaded into a small hand-cranked machine called an "AutoProcessor". The time it required to produce a fully developed film ready for mounting varied from between two and five minutes, depending on the type of film.

Polaroid produced several types of AutoProcess-compatible 35 mm film:

- Polachrome was a color slide film. It was descended from the Polavision system and used the same additive color (RGB filter stripe) process. One difference was that with Polavision, the negative layer remained as part of the film after processing. It was of low optical density (max. 0.3), but nevertheless reduced the contrast of the image. With Polachrome, the negative layer was discarded after processing. Marketed broadly, it was touted to professional photographers for making test shots to evaluate a setup before final shooting was done with their usual film. Its distinctive muted color rendition and the line structure visible in enlargements won it a small following as a unique artistic medium in itself. It remained in production for nearly 20 years.
- PolaPan was a monochrome ("black-and-white") slide film. "PolaPan" is a portmanteau of Polaroid and Panchromatic. The PolaPan name had also been used in connection with Polaroid roll print films Type 42 PolaPan 200 (200 ASA film speed) (also Type 32) and Type 44 PolaPan 400 (400 ASA film speed in daylight).
- Polablue was a slide film with a particular blue color cast.
- Polagraph was a high-contrast color transparency film intended for reproducing subjects like graphs or diagrams.

Polaroid AutoProcess slides could be viewed or projected in the same way as 35 mm slides made with conventional films.

== See also ==
- List of film formats
