= Land Camera =

Model of instant film cameras manufactured by Polaroid from 1948-83

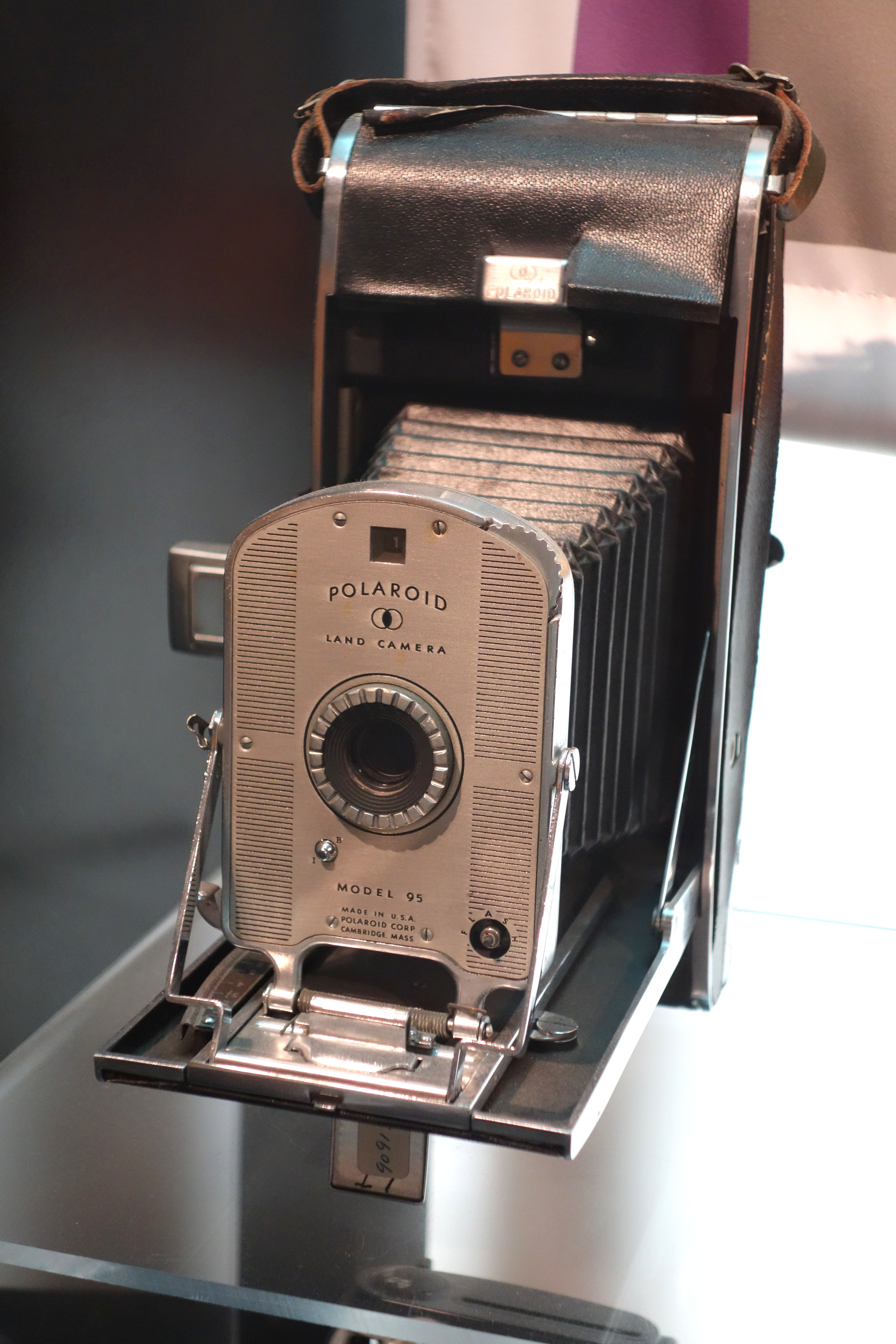
Polaroid Land Camera Model 95, the first commercially available instant camera

The Land Camera is a model of self-developing film camera manufactured by Polaroid between 1948 and 1983. It is named after the inventor, American scientist Edwin Land, who developed a process for self-developing photography between 1943 and 1947. After Edwin Land's retirement from Polaroid in 1982, the name 'Land' was dropped from the camera name. The first commercially available model was the Model 95, which produced sepia-colored prints in about 1 minute. It was first sold to the public on November 26, 1948.

== Film ==
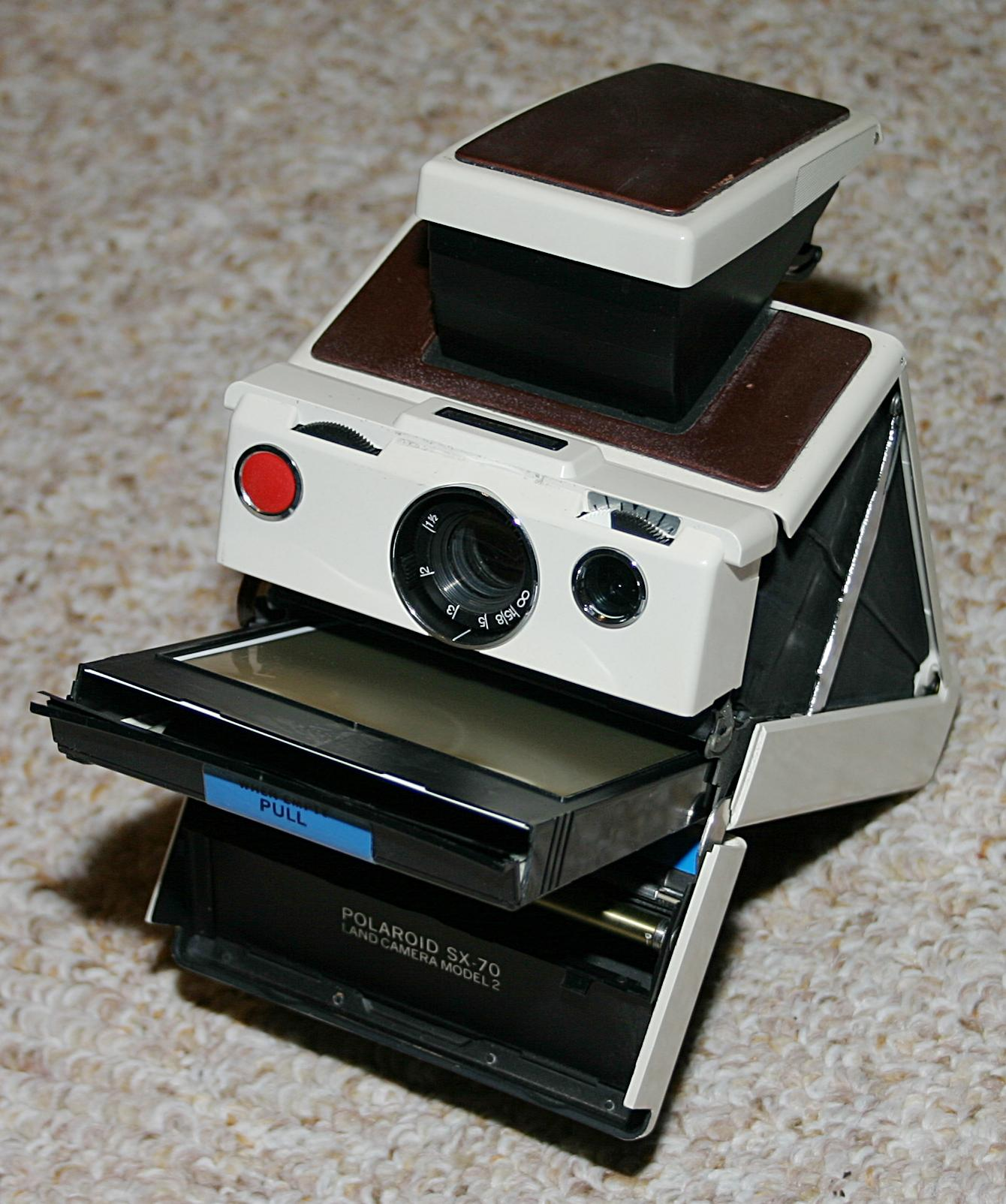
A Polaroid SX-70 camera, manufactured between 1972 and 1981

The photography developing process, invented by Polaroid founder Edwin Land, employs diffusion transfer to move the dyes from the negative to the positive via a reagent. A negative sheet was exposed inside the camera, then lined up with a positive sheet and squeezed through a set of rollers which spread a reagent between the two layers, creating a developing film "sandwich". The negative developed quickly, after which some of the unexposed silver halide grains (and the latent image it contained) were solubilized by the reagent and transferred by diffusion from the negative to the positive. After a minute, the back of the camera was opened and the negative peeled away to reveal the print.

In 1963, Land introduced Polacolor pack film, which made instant color photographs possible. This process involved pulling two tabs from the camera, the second which pulled the film sandwich through the rollers to develop out of the camera. The instant color process is much more complex, involving a negative which contains three layers of emulsion sensitive to blue, green, and red. Underneath each layer are dye developing molecules in their complementary colors of yellow, magenta, and cyan. When light strikes an emulsion layer, it blocks the complementary dye below it. For instance, when blue strikes the blue sensitive emulsion layer, it blocks the yellow dye, but allows the magenta and cyan dyes to transfer to the positive, which combine to create blue. When green and red (yellow) strikes their respective layers, it blocks the complementary dyes of magenta and cyan below them, allowing only yellow dye to transfer to the positive.

In 1972, integral film was introduced which did not require the user to time the development or peel apart the negative from the positive. This process was similar to Polacolor film with added timing and receiving layers. The film itself integrates all the layers to expose, develop, and fix the photo into a plastic envelope commonly associated with a Polaroid photo. The Polaroid SX-70 was the first camera to use this film.

Improvements in SX-70 film led to the higher speed 600 series film, then to different formats such as 500 series (captiva), and spectra.

== Cameras ==
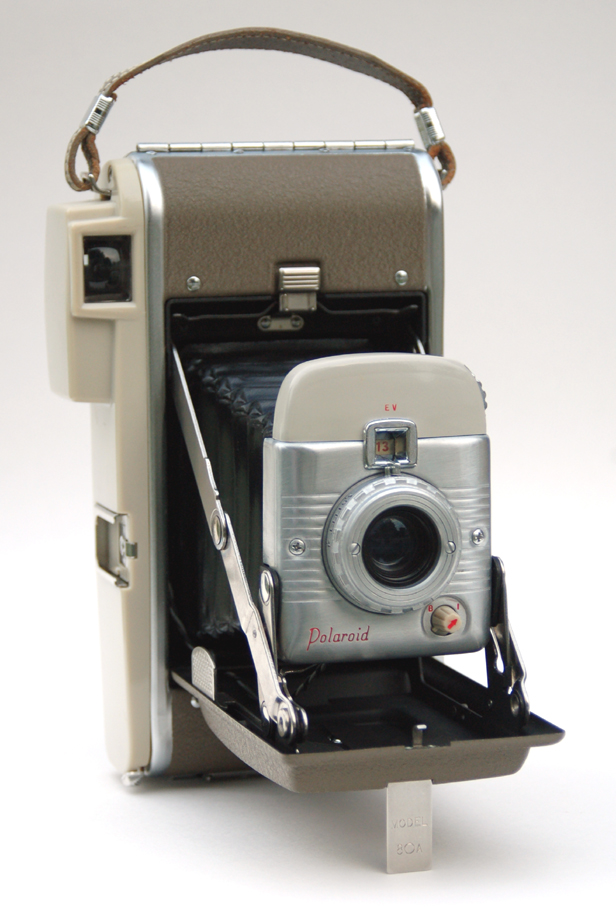
A Highlander rollfilm camera made from 1957 to 1959.

=== Roll film ===
The original cameras folded into the body and used bellows to protect the light path. The film was put on two spools, one with the negative roll, and one with the positive paper and reagent pods. The film developed inside the camera. The exception to this is the Polaroid Swinger, a hard-bodied roll-film camera whose film was pulled out of the camera body to develop outside the camera. The film for roll-film cameras was discontinued in 1992.

=== 100 Series Pack cameras ===
These cameras were developed after the rollfilm models and were designed to use the newly developed 100 series pack film. As with the Swinger the film sandwich was pulled out of the camera to develop outside of the camera, but instead of two separate rolls the film was built into a compact easy loading film pack which contained 8 exposures. Hard body plastic models were marketed later a low cost alternative to the more expensive models with bellows.

There are four generations of folding colorpack cameras: the 100, the 200, the 300, and 400 series. Polaroid announced in 2008 the discontinuation of all of its film by 2009, and Fujifilm stopped producing pack film in 2016. Polaroid B.V. manufactures and sells Polaroid integrative type film for 600 and SX-70 cameras. In September 2019, Spectra/Image film was discontinued.

Meanwhile, Bob Crowley, New55, the investor David Bohnett and Florian Kaps, known as the founder of Impossible Project (now Polaroid B.V.), managed to produce packfilm for the folding colourpack cameras under the label New55. New55 FILM ended operations on December 31, 2017.

Supersence (also founded by Florian Kaps) currently produces single-shot packs handmade from original 8x10 film manufactured by Polaroid named ONE INSTANT.
