= Edwin H. Land =

American scientist, inventor, and entrepreneur (1909–1991)

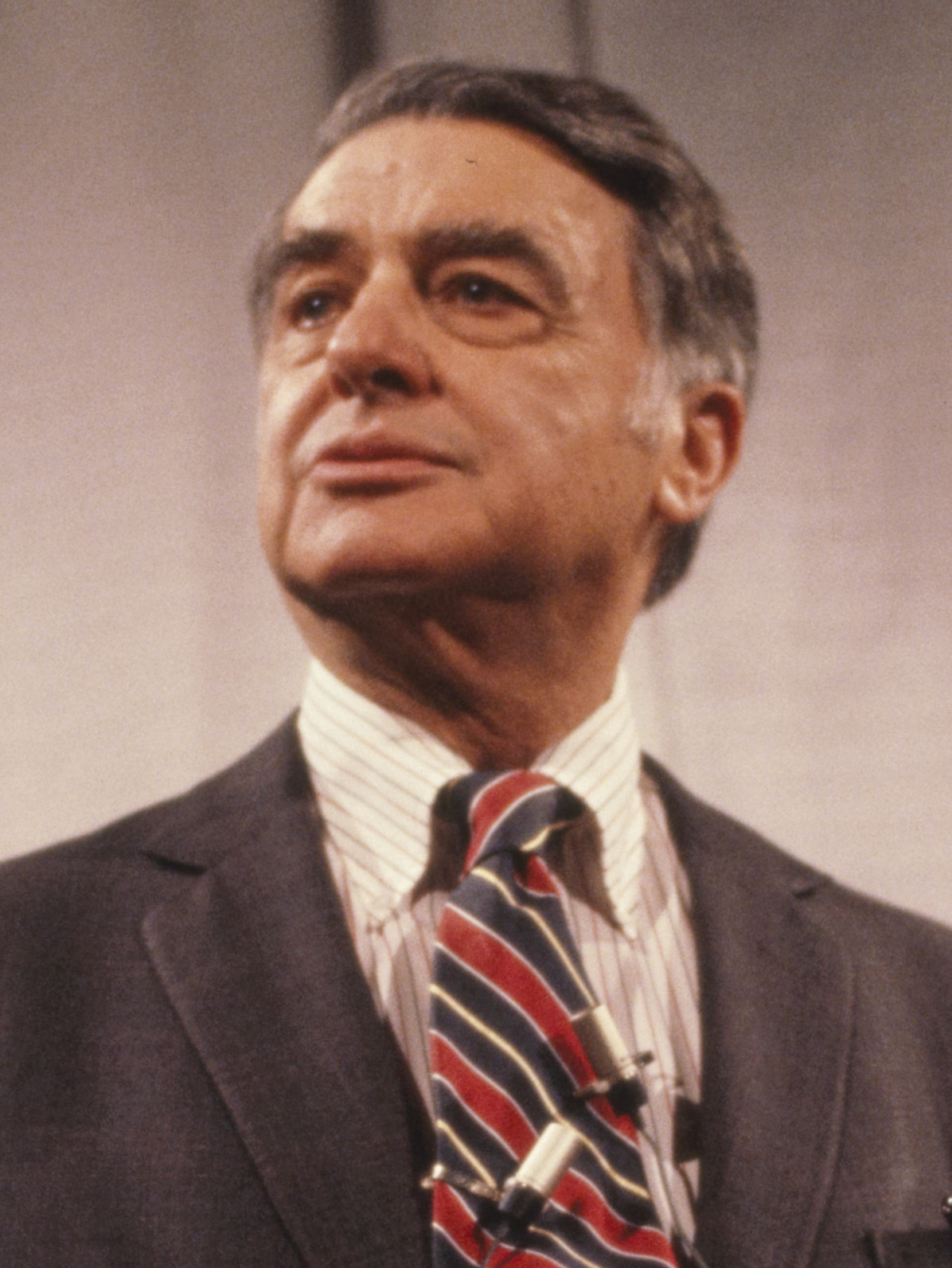
- Land in 1971
- Born: Edwin Herbert Land; May 7, 1909; Bridgeport, Connecticut, U.S.
- Died: March 1, 1991 (aged 81); Cambridge, Massachusetts, U.S.
- Resting place: Mount Auburn Cemetery, U.S.
- Known for: Polarizing film; Land instant camera
- Spouse: Helen Maislen (m. 1929)
- Children: 2
- Scientific career
- Fields: Optics, polarization, color vision

Edwin Herbert Land, ForMemRS, FRPS, Hon.MRI (May 7, 1909 – March 1, 1991) was an American scientist and inventor, best known as the co-founder of the Polaroid Corporation. He invented inexpensive filters for polarizing light, a practical system of in-camera instant photography, and the retinex theory of color vision. His Polaroid instant camera went on sale in 1948 and made it possible for a picture to be taken and developed in one minute or less.

Land received the Presidential Medal of Freedom in 1963, the IRI Medal in 1965, the Perkin Medal in 1974, the Harold Pender Award in 1979, and the National Medal of Technology in 1988. He was also renowned outside of his home country, being a member of England's Royal Photographic Society, Royal Institution, and Royal Society (receiving Fellowship of the latter).

== Early life ==
Edwin Herbert Land was born in Bridgeport, Connecticut, on May 7, 1909, the son of Jewish parents Matie (née Goldfaden) (Note: She is referred to as Matie by McElheny, but Bonanos notes that various sources refer to her as Matha, Matie, or Martha.) and Harry Land. His father was a Ukrainian scrap metal dealer who came to the U.S. from a village near Kyiv. Growing up, he was known to take apart household appliances such as a mantel clock and the family's new gramophone, as well as blowing all the house's fuses when he was six years old. He was scolded by his father when taking apart a gramophone and thus vowed that "nothing or nobody could stop [him] from carrying through the execution of an experiment". He had an older sister, Helen, who had a difficult time pronouncing his name and called him "Din". This became a nickname that stuck throughout the rest of his childhood and was used among his closest friends. Land attended the Norwich Free Academy at Norwich, Connecticut, a semi-private high school, and graduated in the class of 1927 with honors. The library there was posthumously named for him, having been funded by grants from his family.

== Career ==
=== Early career ===
Land studied physics, specifically optics, at Harvard University but left after his freshman year and moved to New York City. There he invented the first inexpensive filters capable of polarizing light, which he called Polaroid film. He was not associated with an educational institution and lacked the tools of a proper laboratory, making this a difficult endeavor, so he would sneak into a laboratory at Columbia University late at night to use their equipment. He also availed himself of the New York Public Library to scour the scientific literature for prior work on polarizing substances. In 1928, Land achieved his breakthrough by using a magnetic field to orient microscopic crystals suspended in lacquer.

Land returned to Harvard University after developing the polarizing film, but he did not finish his studies or receive a degree. Despite not receiving a college degree, he was still referred to by many as Dr. Land. According to biographer Peter Wensberg, once Land could see the solution to a problem in his head, he lost all motivation to write it down or prove his vision to others. Often his wife, Terre, would extract from him the answers to homework problems, at the prodding of his instructor. She would then write up the homework and hand it in so that he could receive credit and not fail the course.

=== Polaroid ===
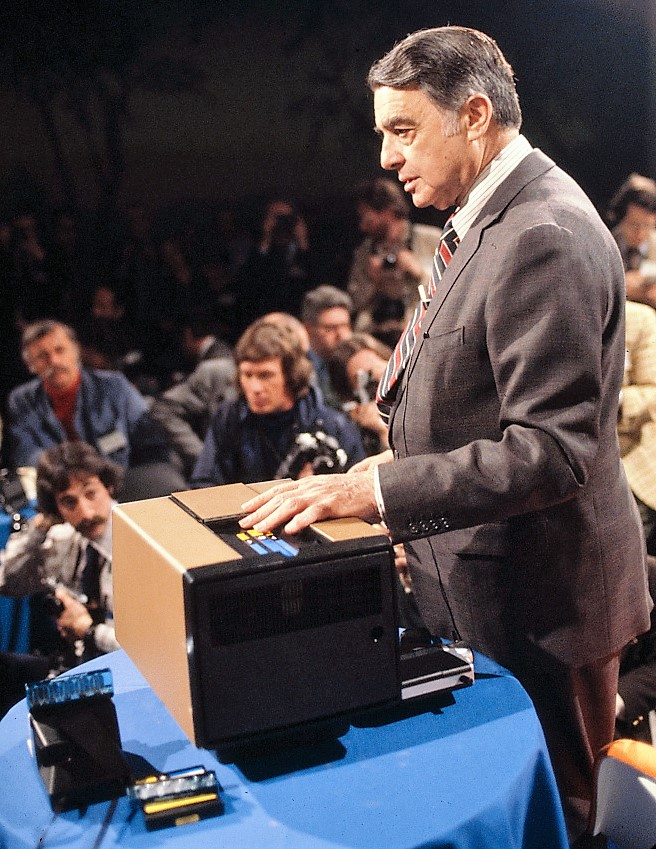
Land presenting the Polavision home movie system, 1977

In 1932, he established the Land-Wheelwright Laboratories together with his Harvard physics professor, George Wheelwright III, to commercialize his polarizing technology. Wheelwright came from a family of financial means and agreed to fund the company. After a few early successes developing polarizing filters for sunglasses and photographic filters, Land obtained funding from a series of Wall Street investors for further expansion.

The company was renamed the Polaroid Corporation in 1937.

Land further developed and produced the sheet polarizers under the Polaroid trademark. Although the initial major application was for sunglasses and scientific work, it quickly found many additional applications: for color animation in the Wurlitzer 850 Peacock jukebox of 1942, for glasses in full-color stereoscopic (3-D) movies, to control brightness of light through a window, as a necessary component of all LCDs, and many more.

During World War II, he worked on military tasks, which included developing dark-adaptation goggles, target finders, the first passively guided smart bombs, and a special stereoscopic viewing system called the Vectograph, co-invented with Czech refugee Joseph Mahler, which revealed camouflaged enemy positions in aerial photography. With all this, he was also a consultant to the National Defense Research Committee which focused its efforts on non-governmental scientific research.

On a vacation to Santa Fe, New Mexico, with his three-year-old eldest daughter, Jennifer, he took a picture of her. After she asked why she could not see the picture her father just took of her, within an hour he already had the idea for an instant film camera. His patent attorney, Donald Brown, was also there at the time visiting Santa Fe and he quickly approached him with this idea and Brown agreed on the idea. After this trip, research for the development of this idea began immediately.

A little more than three years later, on February 21, 1947, Land demonstrated an instant camera and associated film to the Optical Society of America. Called the Land Camera, it was in commercial sale less than two years later. Polaroid originally manufactured sixty units of this first camera. Fifty-seven were put up for sale at the Jordan Marsh department store in Boston before the 1948 Christmas holiday. Polaroid marketers incorrectly guessed that the camera and film would remain in stock long enough to manufacture a second run based on customer demand. All fifty-seven cameras and all of the film were sold on the first day of demonstrations.

During his time at Polaroid, Land was notorious for his marathon research sessions. When Land conceived of an idea, he would experiment and brainstorm until the problem was solved with no breaks of any kind. He needed to have food brought to him and to be reminded to eat. He once wore the same clothes for eighteen consecutive days while solving problems with the commercial production of polarizing film. As the Polaroid company grew, Land had teams of assistants working in shifts at his side. As one team wore out, the next team was brought in to continue the work.

Elkan Blout, a close colleague of Edwin Land at Polaroid, wrote: "What was Land like? Knowing him was a unique experience. He was a true visionary; he saw things differently from other people, which is what led him to the idea of instant photography. He was a brilliant, driven man who did not spare himself and who enjoyed working with equally driven people."

=== Contributions to photo intelligence ===
Beginning in the early years of the Cold War, Land played a major role in the development of photographic reconnaissance and intelligence gathering efforts. Projects included the Genetrix balloon borne cameras, the U-2 program, Corona and Samos photographic satellites, and the Manned Orbiting Laboratory. He was a frequent advisor to President Dwight D. Eisenhower on photographic reconnaissance matters.

=== Later career ===
In the 1950s, James G. Baker, Land, and his team helped design the optics of the revolutionary Lockheed U-2 spy plane. He also contributed to the design of the plane with Kelly Johnson. Also in this decade, Land first discovered a two-color system for projecting the entire spectrum of hues with only two colors of projecting light (he later found more specifically that one could achieve the same effect using very narrow bands of 579 nm and 599 nm light). Some of this work was later incorporated in his Retinex theory of color vision.

In 1957, Harvard University awarded him an honorary doctorate, and Edwin H. Land Blvd., a street in Cambridge, Massachusetts, was later named in his memory. The street is at one end of Memorial Drive, in Cambridge, where the Polaroid company headquarters building was located (over a mile west on Memorial Drive from Land Blvd.). Polaroid occupied several buildings in various places in Cambridge.

In the 1950s, Land was appointed Visiting Institute Professor, the highest rank of professor at MIT, and in 1957 delivered an influential lecture on the importance of the technical university in the development of science and society. In 1968, Land made a large gift to MIT to fund initiatives for improving undergraduate education. The Experimental Studies Group (ESG, which allows MIT students to complete their core General Institute Requirements in biology, chemistry, math, physics, and humanities through small, discussion-based classes and close faculty mentorship), Concourse (a first-year program that brings science into conversation with the humanities), and the Undergraduate Research Opportunities Program (UROP, which provides funding for undergraduates to participate in faculty-mentored research) were all born from this gift.

In the early 1970s, starting with the previously known phenomenon of color constancy, Land developed a new Retinex Theory of color vision. His popular demonstrations of color constancy raised much interest in the concept. He considered his leadership towards the development of integral instant color photography – the SX-70 film and camera – to be his crowning achievement.

Although he led the Polaroid Corporation as a chief executive, Land was a scientist first and foremost, and as such made sure that he performed "an experiment each day". Despite holding no formal degree, employees, friends, and the press respected his scientific accomplishments by calling him Dr. Land. The only exception was The Wall Street Journal, which refused to use that honorific title throughout his lifetime.

Land often made technical and management decisions based on what he felt was right as both a scientist and a humanist, much to the chagrin of Wall Street and his investors. From the beginning of his professional career, he hired women and trained them to be research scientists. A notable example is Meroë Morse. Following the assassination of Martin Luther King Jr. in 1968, he led Polaroid to the forefront of the affirmative action movement.

He had an artistic vision. In his laboratory, he built giant studio cameras the size of bedroom closets that produced large format (20 x 24 inch) prints. He gave photographers free access to these cameras in return for some of the prints they produced. This practice was continued by the company; the result was the Polaroid Collection. Compiled since the 1970s, the collection grew to between 16,000 and 24,000 photos shot by some of the world's greatest artists and photographers, including Ansel Adams, Chuck Close, Robert Frank and Andy Warhol. The collection, an asset of the Polaroid Corporation, remained intact until 2010 when, in controversial circumstances, it was broken up and put up for sale in lots.

Land resigned from his role as U.S. President Richard Nixon's presidential advisor during the Watergate scandal in 1973. He was one of the names in Nixon's notorious list of political opponents, following the original top 20 enemies.

Despite the tremendous success of his instant cameras, Land's Polavision instant movie system was a financial disaster, and he resigned as Chairman of Polaroid on July 27, 1982. When he retired, he had 535 patents to his name, only surpassed by Thomas Edison and Elihu Thomson. While he was set for retirement years, this did not mean the end of his passion in research and decided to continue with his interest in color vision. From 1978, he was a regular visitor to the laboratory of Semir Zeki at University College London, to attend Zeki's experiments on color vision. Although they never published together, Land was to design the gelatin filters to accompany the paper on the physiology of color vision published by Zeki in Nature in 1980. These filters, and especially the long-wave one, were later used to study details of the structure of DNA.

Before Land died, Zeki negotiated with the Royal Society to take a page of the Royal Society Fellows Book for Land to sign in the United States, since he was too ill to attend the signing ceremony in London. It was signed at a small private ceremony in Land's home in Cambridge, Mass., attended by his son-in-law; the citations were read by Zeki and Hugh Huxley admitted Land formally to the Society. The other Foreign Member of the Royal Society who also signed the book on the same occasion was Ed Purcell, the discoverer of nuclear magnetic resonance and a friend of Edwin Land. It is reputed that the only other times that the book (or in this case a page of it) of the Royal Society was taken outside its house in London was when it was signed by Sigmund Freud and Winston Churchill, both in their homes in London. In his later years, Land founded the Rowland Institute for Science where he found a vacant lot besides Charles River at Kendall Square.

== Death ==
On March 1, 1991, Land died at the age of 81 in Cambridge, Massachusetts. He is buried at Mount Auburn Cemetery in Cambridge. He was survived by Helen "Terre" Maislen, to whom he had been married since 1929, and their two daughters Jennifer and Valerie; all three declined to disclose the cause of his death. He disliked people writing about him, preferring to leave behind a legacy of published scientific work rather than a cult of personality, and his family thus had a laboratory associate shred his personal papers and notes after his death; there were so many that the task took three years to complete.

== Public service ==
Land was:

- A member of the President's Science Advisory Committee (PSAC) 1957–59 and a Consultant-at-Large of PSAC from 1960 to 1973.
- A member of the President's Foreign Intelligence Advisory Board (PFIAB) 1961–77.
- A member of the National Commission on Technology, Automation and Economic Progress 1964–66.
- A member of the Carnegie Commission on Educational Television 1966–67.
- A Trustee of the Ford Foundation 1967–1975.

== Honors ==
- 1935 Hood Medal of the Royal Photographic Society of Great Britain
- 1938 Elliott Cresson Medal, Franklin Institute of Philadelphia
- 1940 National Modern Pioneer Award, National Association of Manufacturers
- 1943 elected to the American Academy of Arts and Sciences
- 1945 Rumford Medal, American Academy of Arts and Sciences
- 1948 Holley Medal, American Society of Mechanical Engineers
- 1949 Duddell Medal, Physical Society of Great Britain
- 1953 elected to the United States National Academy of Sciences
- 1956 Howard N. Potts Medal
- 1957 elected to the American Philosophical Society
- 1963 Presidential Medal of Freedom, the highest award given to a U.S. citizen, for his work in optics.
- 1965 IRI Medal from the Industrial Research Institute
- 1966 Albert A. Michelson Award from the Case Institute of Technology
- 1967 Frederic Ives Medal by the Optical Society of America.
- 1967 National Medal of Science
- 1967 The Cultural Award from the German Society for Photography (DGPh), with Henri Cartier-Bresson
- 1972 Founders Medal, National Academy of Engineering
- 1972 Elected an Honorary Member of The Optical Society.
- 1974 Vermilye Medal
- 1977 inducted into the National Inventors Hall of Fame
- 1988 National Medal of Technology for "the invention, development and marketing of instant photography".
- 1991 inducted into the International Photography Hall of Fame and Museum
- Although Land never received a formal degree, he received honorary degrees from Harvard University, Yale University, Columbia University, Carnegie Mellon University, Willams College, Tufts College, Washington University in St. Louis, Polytechnic Institute of Brooklyn, University of Massachusetts, Brandeis University and many others.
- He held 535 patents, compared with Thomas Edison's 1,097 American patents.
- Land's development of instant photography was designated a National Historic Chemical Landmark by the American Chemical Society on August 13, 2015.
- Land is referenced in the Lego set based on the Polaroid OneStep SX-70 Camera.

== Bibliography ==
- Land, E. H.; Daw, N. W. (1962). "Binocular Combination of Projected Images". Science. 138 (3540): 589–590. Bibcode:1962Sci...138..589L. doi:10.1126/science.138.3540.589. PMID 17832004. S2CID 26080709.

== Sources ==
- Earls, Alan R. and Rohani, Nasrin (2005), Polaroid Arcadia Publishing, Charleston, S.C., ISBN 0-7385-3699-7
- Wensberg, P. C. (1987) Land's Polaroid: a company and the man who invented it Houghton Mifflin, New York, ISBN 0-395-42114-4
- McElheny, Victor K. (1999) Edwin Herbert Land: May 7, 1909 – March 1, 1991 National Academy Press, Washington, D.C., ISBN 0-309-06644-1
