= Spice Girls merchandise and sponsorship deals =

The Spice Girls are an English girl group that first came to international prominence in 1996 with the release of their debut single "Wannabe". The following year, they became involved in a prolific marketing phenomenon, leading to an unprecedented number of Spice Girls merchandise and sponsorship deals. With their name attached to numerous sponsors including Pepsi, Cadbury and Polaroid, and the official Spice Girls branding on hundreds of different product tie-ins, they quickly became the most merchandised group in music history. Their global merchandising efforts alone brought in over £300 million in 1997, while the group's total grosses were estimated at US$500–800 million by May 1998.

Industry pundits attribute much of the brand's success to the group's longtime manager Simon Fuller. By the end of 1997, however, the overwhelming number of Spice Girls merchandise and sponsorship deals led to a public and media backlash. The group responded by firing Fuller and slowing down, but not stopping, their marketing pursuits. They eventually disbanded in 2000, but the marketing phenomenon they created in the 1990s has had a lasting influence on the modern music industry.

== History ==
=== 1997: Unprecedented merchandising ===
Off the back of their record-breaking debut album Spice, the Spice Girls began signing many lucrative merchandising and endorsement deals.

In February 1997, the Spice Girls were booked to help launch the West McLaren Mercedes MP4/12 at London's Alexandra Palace. They performed "Wannabe", "Say You'll Be There" and "Who Do You Think You Are" to an assembled audience of five thousand, comprising media, sponsors, VIP guests and fans. The event was filmed by MTV and presented by Davina McCall. In March, Girl Power!, the Spice Girls' first book was launched at the Virgin Megastore; it sold out its initial print run of 200,000 copies within a day, and was eventually translated into more than 20 languages. Later that month, the group were booked to launch Britain's fifth terrestrial television network, Channel 5, for a reported fee of £500,000. They appeared in promotional print ads, recorded a song ("1,2,3,4,5!") and filmed a music video that became the network's first broadcast programme. The launch was watched by 2.49 million viewers. During this time, the group also launched Spice, the quarterly Spice Girls fanclub magazine. In April, One Hour of Girl Power, an official Spice Girls VHS documentary, was released; it sold almost 500,000 copies in the UK between April and June to become the best-selling pop video ever.

In early 1997, the Spice Girls signed a multimillion-dollar endorsement deal with PepsiCo to launch the soft drink company's Generation Next campaign. 92 million promotional Pepsi cans and bottles featuring the Spice Girls individually and as a group were produced worldwide. Promotional giveaways included collectible drinking glasses and two limited edition music singles, "Step to Me" and "Move Over (Generation Next)". These promotional offers for the group's singles were the first of their kind in the music industry. Around 600,000 copies of the "Step to Me" single were redeemed via the Pepsi offer, making it "the most successful on-pack promotion in the history of the U.K. soft-drink market." The group also starred in three television adverts for Pepsi, all featuring the song "Move Over", that were aired on TV and in cinemas in 93 countries. In October 1997, the group performed two live concerts in Istanbul sponsored by the soft drink company; tickets for the concerts were available exclusively through a Pepsi offer, causing the UK sales of Pepsi to increase by 30% during this one-week promotion. The Spice Girls' "Generation Next" campaign led to a record five percent gain in the cola market share for Pepsi in 1997 and the endorsement deal was extended in November 1997 for an additional £500,000. In a 2014 interview with BBC Radio 2, the group's longtime manager Simon Fuller claimed that Pepsi spent around $100 million on the Spice Girls' endorsement campaign.

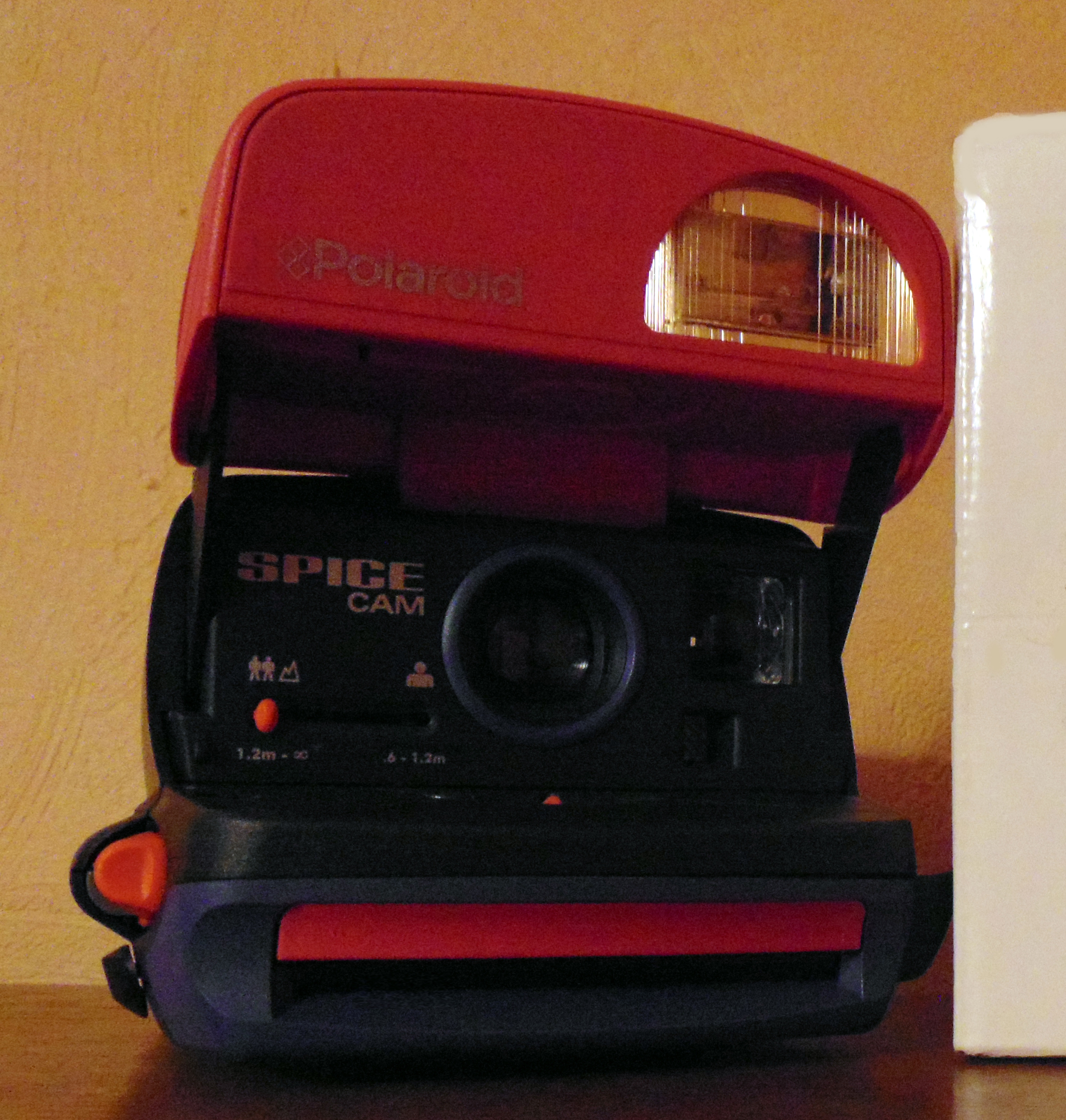
The Spice Cam

By June 1997, it was reported that the Spice Girls had applied for more than 100 trademarks. The following month, the group began an endorsement deal with Walkers Crisps to launch their "Cheese & Chives" flavour. The Spice Girls were featured on various crisps packets individually and as a group. They also starred in two television adverts alongside Gary Lineker and a number of promotional photoshoots for the British potato chip maker. The Spice Girls campaign was Walkers' "biggest ever promotional effort"; the company reported a six percent increase in their brand's volume share of the crisp market within the first eight weeks of the campaign, and had sold 16 million packs of their Spice Girls crisps by October that year. In the summer of 1997, the toy company Magic Box Toys created the first Spice Girls collectible photo album and trading card series. It was estimated by Forbes that 25 million cards had been sold by September 1997. Later, a second photocard series was released, along with an official Spice World: The Movie sticker book. During this time, Polaroid also signed a deal with the group to produce various Spice Girls-branded products including the Spice Cam, a variation on the original Polaroid 600 Instant Camera and Polaroid's first camera to be named after a group or person, that was marketed in the United States, Europe, Asia and Australia. The group filmed adverts and conducted a number of promotional photoshoots for the Spice Cam. In August 1997, the Spice Girls teamed up with Impulse to launch a fragrance known as "Impulse Spice", with a scent that was meant to reflect each individual member of the band. Limited edition deodorant body spray and shower gel products were produced. A£1.8 million advertising campaign accompanied the Impulse Spice launch, including a television advert the group filmed for the product. The Spice Girls' fragrance was sold in 50 countries and quickly became Impulse's "most successful variant ever." During this time, the Spice Girls also signed up for product tie-ins with Benetton, Zeon watches (Spice Girls-themed watches and clocks), British Telecom (Spice Girls-themed phonecards) and Elisabeth the Chef (Spice Girls-themed cakes).

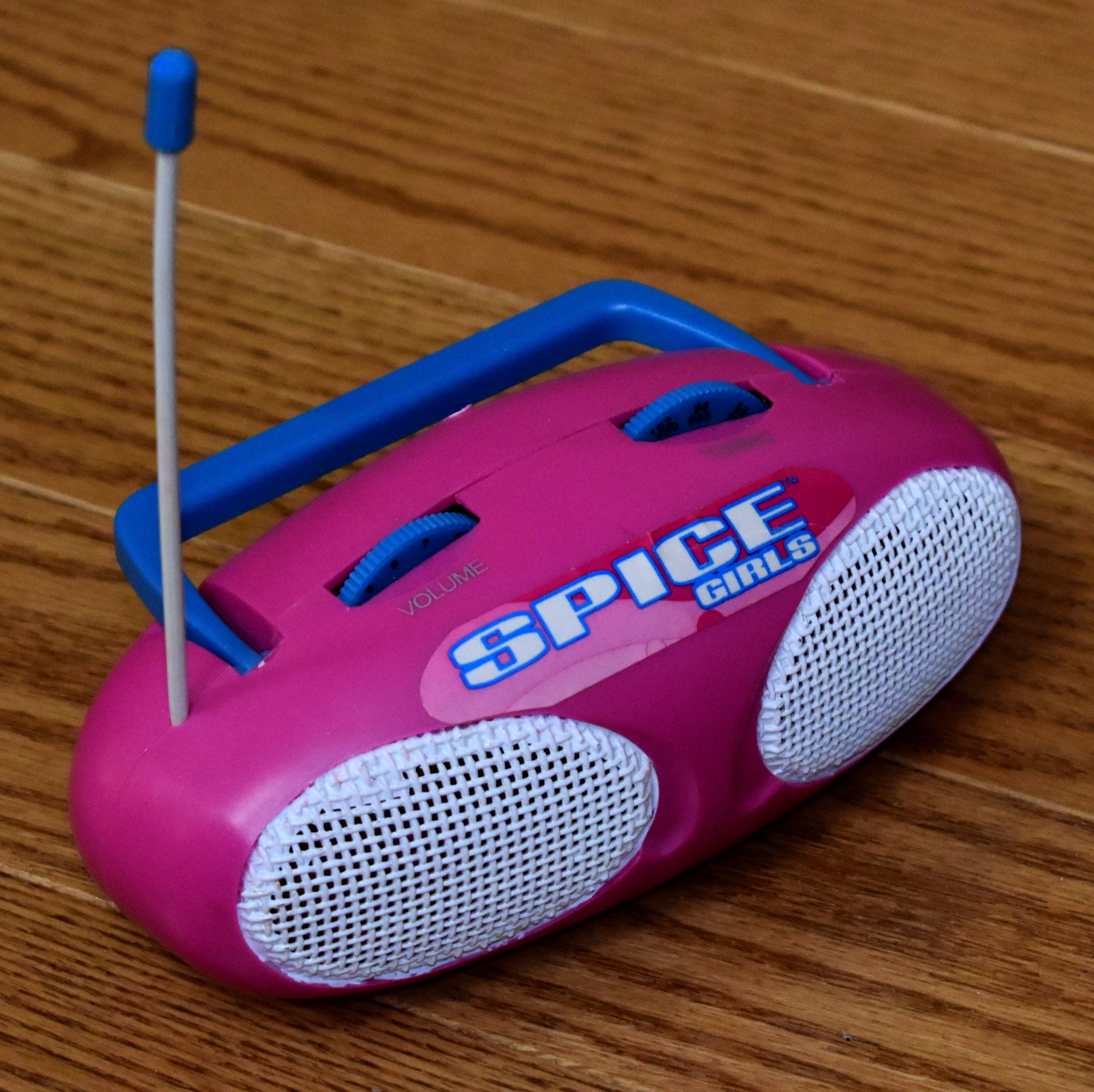
A Spice Girls-branded radio, one of the many products sold by the group.

In September 1997, British supermarket chain Asda signed a £1 million merchandising deal to launch a wide range of Spice Girls products for the 1997 Christmas season. Over 40 different Spice Girls-branded goods were stocked including food, clothing, gifts, stationery, party supplies, Christmas crackers, individual pizzas with each band member representing a different flavour, homewear, books, videos, platform shoes and even Spice Girls-branded Kids Meals Boxes in the stores' restaurants. The deal was promoted in Asda's pre-Christmas television and print advertising campaign. That same month, it was announced that the Spice Girls had signed a licensing deal with merchandising company PMS International to produce a wide range of official Spice Girls products. Over 200 separate Spice Girls items were released including stationery, toys, lunch boxes, bags, purses, party goods, clothing, mugs, cosmetics, postcards, picture frames, keyrings and badges, all in the Spice Girls official colours of magenta and white. Upon the release of Spice World, movie memorabilia was also produced, including toy versions of the Spice Bus. In October 1997, Cadbury signed a deal with the band to release a range of Spice Girls-branded chocolate products. The range consisted of 10 chocolate countlines, assorted boxes and holiday confectioneries including Easter eggs, featuring the Spice Girls individually or as a group. In the same month, it was announced that the Spice Girls had signed a deal with Chupa Chups to release a range of Spice Girls products, including different tins filled with assorted lollipops featuring each girl, "Fantasy Ball" Chupa Chups with different packages each featuring a collectible Spice Girl sticker, "Push Pops", "Crazy Dips", toy microphones and bubblegum packets that came with collectible Spice Girls temporary tattoos. The band also signed a merchandising and distribution deal with American retailer Target. The discount store retailer was one of the largest suppliers of official Spice Girls merchandise in the United States and Australia, devoting aisles to Spice Girls products such as bikes, school supplies, party supplies, and toys. The Spice Girls were also sponsored by shoe brands Shellys London and Buffalo, and launched an official shoe line for adults and children.

In December 1997, the first series of official Spice Girls dolls by toy company Galoob (now Hasbro) was released, with subsequent series released in 1998 and 1999. The dolls became a huge hit during the 1997 and 1998 Christmas seasons, selling over 11 million to become the best-selling celebrity dolls of all time. The dolls were the fifth best-selling toy—despite limited stock—in the UK for the 1997 Christmas season according to the British Association of Toy Retailers' annual Christmas best seller chart, and the second best-selling toy of 1998 in the United States according to toy trade publication Playthings' annual industry survey.

By the end of 1997, the Spice Girls had become a "formidable money making machine", estimated to have earned over £300 million ($500 million) that year from their marketing endeavours. The Spice Girls brand was named one of 1997's best brands in Advertising Age's annual "Top Marketing 100" list. Some analysts cautioned of a brand "overkill", with The Independent's Paul McCann warning that the "endless exploitation of the band's name signals the beginning of the end for the Spice phenomenon." At this point, the Spice Girls themselves had reportedly grown weary of the "endless" corporate obligations and fired their manager Simon Fuller.

=== 1998–2000: Continued success and hiatus ===
The group started off 1998 by hiring KLP Euro RSCG as their new commercial agent and Big Tours as their licensing and merchandising agent. Under KLP, they adopted a new marketing strategy which saw them slow down their marketing efforts, reportedly turning down numerous sponsorship offers from this point on.

In early 1998, the Spice Girls signed a sponsorship deal for the European leg of their 1998 Spiceworld Tour with Italian scooter maker Aprilia. As part of the deal, five different "Spice Sonic" scooters—each promoting a Spice Girl—were created and marketed. The group also participated in a promotional photoshoot and filmed a television advert to promote the scooters. However, relations soured between the group and the Italian company after Halliwell's sudden departure in May 1998. In January 2002, after losing a long-running legal dispute in Spice Girls Ltd v Aprilia World Service BV, the group was ordered to pay $67,000 for scooters Aprilia supplied to the band members, in addition to damages and legal costs.

Spice World, a video game featuring 3D-animated likenesses of the Spice Girls, was developed and released by Sony Computer Entertainment Europe for the PlayStation in 1998. The video game was sold out in the UK within several months of its release. The Spice Girls also endorsed the sugar brand Domino Sugar in a promotional photoshoot. By May 1998, the band had become a "$500 million merchandising and marketing industry" according to CNN, while Entertainment Weekly placed their global gross income up to that point at $500–800 million.

The Spice Girls embarked on the North American leg of their Spiceworld Tour in June 1998. Throughout this leg of the tour, commercials for their sponsors, including Revlon, Pepsi, Biore and Domino Sugar, were played on the large concert screens before the shows and during intermissions. It was the first time advertising had been used in pop concerts and was met with mixed reactions in the music industry, with Jon Pareles of The New York Times dubbing the band forerunners of "buy-me feminism". Nevertheless, it opened up a whole new concert revenue stream, with music industry pundits predicting more acts would follow the Spice Girls' lead.

Leading up to the Christmas season, bicycle company PTI Holding Inc. signed an exclusive agreement in August 1998 to manufacture and distribute Spice Girls-branded bicycles, helmets, in-line skates and bicycle accessory products for North America. The company received over $3 million in pre-order commitments on the day the deal was announced, and began shipping products towards the end of the year. Around the same time, toymaker Toymax introduced new lines of licensed Spice Girls dolls, toys, accessories and youth electronics. In November 1998, a new line of official Spice Girls bean bag dolls and collectibles were put on the market by Bravado International Group.

In May 1999, the Spice Girls ranked sixth in Forbes' inaugural Celebrity 100 Power Ranking, which ranks celebrities based on their brand power.

In December 2000, the group went on an indefinite hiatus to concentrate on their solo careers.

=== 2007–2008: First reunion ===
The Spice Girls reunited for a concert tour in 2007 to 2008. In October 2007, it was announced that the Spice Girls had signed a deal with lingerie chain Victoria's Secret. Under the deal, the group's greatest hits album was exclusively sold in the United States through Victoria's Secret for the first two months of its release. The group also performed at the Victoria's Secret Fashion Show later that year. British supermarket chain Tesco also recruited the Spice Girls to front a two-part Christmas television ad campaign in 2007, in a deal that reportedly earned each girl £1 million.

=== 2019–present: Second reunion ===
In conjunction with the Spice World – 2019 Tour, the Spice Girls teamed up with the children's book franchise Mr. Men to create many derivative products such as books, cups, bags and coasters. The group also launched an advertising campaign with Walkers who they had previously worked with in the 1990s. The campaign included Spice Girls branded products in supermarkets to promote Walkers' Cheese & Onion flavouring, as well as a television advertisement starring the group that premiered during the 2019 Britain's Got Talent semi-finals.

In October 2021, the group announced a new multi-year merchandising deal with Universal Music Group's Bravado division. The deal saw the release of new merchandise in conjunction with the 25th anniversary of the group's debut album Spice. The following year, Lego BrickHeadz released a Spice Girls Tribute Set, making the group the first non-fictional persons to be recreated as Lego in the BrickHeadz product line.

== Brand appeal and strategy ==
At the height of Spicemania, the Spice Girls were extremely popular with the tween demographic as well as the mothers of their young fans. Their image was considered young, fun and exciting, providing companies with a way of breaking into new markets that involved pre-teens and women. According to trade magazine Brandweek's Danny Rogers, much of the success of the Spice Girls brand was down to good timing. He noted that the band "struck a chord at a time when corporate marketers had been searching for solid points of pop-cultural interface with pre-teen and young teen girls." Marc Greengrass, account director for the advertising agency Gepetto, added: "They have also appeared at a time when there is a distinct lack of female heroines for this age group and [they] use a terrific message: total empowerment." Rogers highlighted the Spice World video game which was purchased mostly by "mothers and daughters", thus expanding Sony PlayStation's reach beyond the young male demographic that heavily dominated the video game market at the time. Similarly, cosmetics brand Fabergé wanted to capitalise on the "girl power" trend and saw Impulse Spice as "a rare opportunity to appeal to the 13-plus age group". The group's distinctive personas (Ginger, Scary, Baby, Sporty and Posh) also bolstered their appeal to advertisers, allowing brands to personalise their products to each identity.

Commentators often attribute the Spice Girls' vast marketing and merchandising efforts to their longtime manager Simon Fuller, dubbed "Svengali Spice" by the press. In 1997, Fuller was selected as one of Advertising Age's annual "Marketing 100" honorees, which awards 100 individuals for excellence in brand building. Fuller later explained in Wannabe: How The Spice Girls Reinvented Pop Fame (2004):

The sponsorship deals were far more about exposure than the money. A lot of money was made, but my thinking was if we can get Pepsi to spend $40 million basically running what was a commercial for my group, then Hallelujah! If Procter & Gamble wanted to launch a new image for one of their body sprays by spending £20 million ... That was the way I did it. And it happened so fast. Because I thought of it not as a deal in terms of making a million quid. It was about using their money to make my group famous, and then they'd make lots of money anyway.

Gerrard Tyrrell, Fuller's "right-hand man", added that these product tie-ins were the key to making the Spice Girls famous worldwide, especially outside of the US and UK where their record label did not have as much reach. The group gained massive international exposure by putting their name on products that were already popular in a particular territory, such as Chupa Chup lollipops in Spain and Pepsi in Southeast Asia.

== Backlash and criticism ==
The volume and nature of the product tie-ins and commercial sponsorships at the height of the Spice Girls phenomenon began to tarnish the band's image. During the summer of 1997, the group was criticised for "selling out" to worldwide brands, being accused of overexposure and signing too many sponsorship contracts with large corporate businesses. According to Rolling Stone's David Sinclair, "So great was the daily bombardment of Spice images and Spice product that it quickly became oppressive even to people who were well disposed towards the group."

Market research at the height of Spicemania found that consumers could no longer keep track of the many products the group was putting their name on. Meanwhile, a national survey in October 1997 found that two-thirds of people in Britain believed the group to be over-exposed. Commentators opined that the band's music seemed like an afterthought, instead, Newsweek wrote, "the girls' main focus seems to be collecting huge fees for their advertising deals". British music journalist Neil McCormick found that the group's marketing pursuits had seeped into their music, describing their second studio album Spiceworld as "a marketing person's idea of what a pop record should sound like, filled with buzzwords masquerading as lyrics and melodies that are memorable only because you have heard them so many times before." Slate's David Plotz noted that other music stars have had spinoff merchandise in the past, but never anything on the Spice Girls' scale. "Life is different in Spiceworld," he explained, "If there is a product that 12-year-olds use, there will be a Spice Girls version of it in your mall by Thanksgiving."

== Legacy and impact ==
In his analysis of the group's lasting influence on 21st-century popular culture, John Mckie of the BBC News noted that while other celebrities had used brand endorsements in the past, "the Spice brand was the first to propel the success of the band". Music Week credited Fuller's "ground-breaking" strategy of marketing the Spice Girls as a brand with revolutionising the pop music industry and "paving the way for everything from The White Stripes cameras to U2 iPods and Girls Aloud phones." According to the trade magazine, it was due to the "remarkable" impact of the Spice Girls that pop music and brand synergy have become inextricably linked in the modern music industry. The Guardian's Sylvia Patterson also wrote of what she called the group's true legacy: "[T]hey were the original pioneers of the band as brand, of pop as a ruthless marketing ruse, of the merchandising and sponsorship deals that have dominated commercial pop ever since."

In a 2016 Vice op-ed, Tara Joshi acknowledged that "[a]s the Spice Girls' reign went on, they seemed to become less of a musical entity and more and more of an overt marketing tool, with Pepsi, Walkers, Polaroid, Barbie and more scoring very lucrative deals with them". However, she went on to argue that it is this merchandising success that "reinforce[s] the pop cultural phenomenon they had bestowed upon the British music industry and the world." Joshi concludes that a "pop act having this much sway in the products people were buying was unprecedented – on that scale, it seems unlikely to ever be repeated".

Since 2008, "Spiceworld: The Exhibition", a collection of over 5,000 Spice Girls memorabilia and merchandise, has been showcased in museums across the UK, including the Leeds City Museum in 2011, Northampton Museum and Art Gallery in 2012, Tower Museum in 2012, Ripley's Believe It or Not! London and Blackpool museums in 2015 and 2016, and the Watford Colosseum in 2016. The collection is owned by Liz West, the Guinness World Record holder for the largest collection of Spice Girls memorabilia. "The Spice Girls Exhibition", a collection of over 1,000 Spice Girls items owned by Alan Smith-Allison, was held at the Trakasol Cultural Centre in Limassol Marina, Cyprus in the summer of 2016.

== See also ==
- Spice Girls filmography
