= Polaroid Impulse =

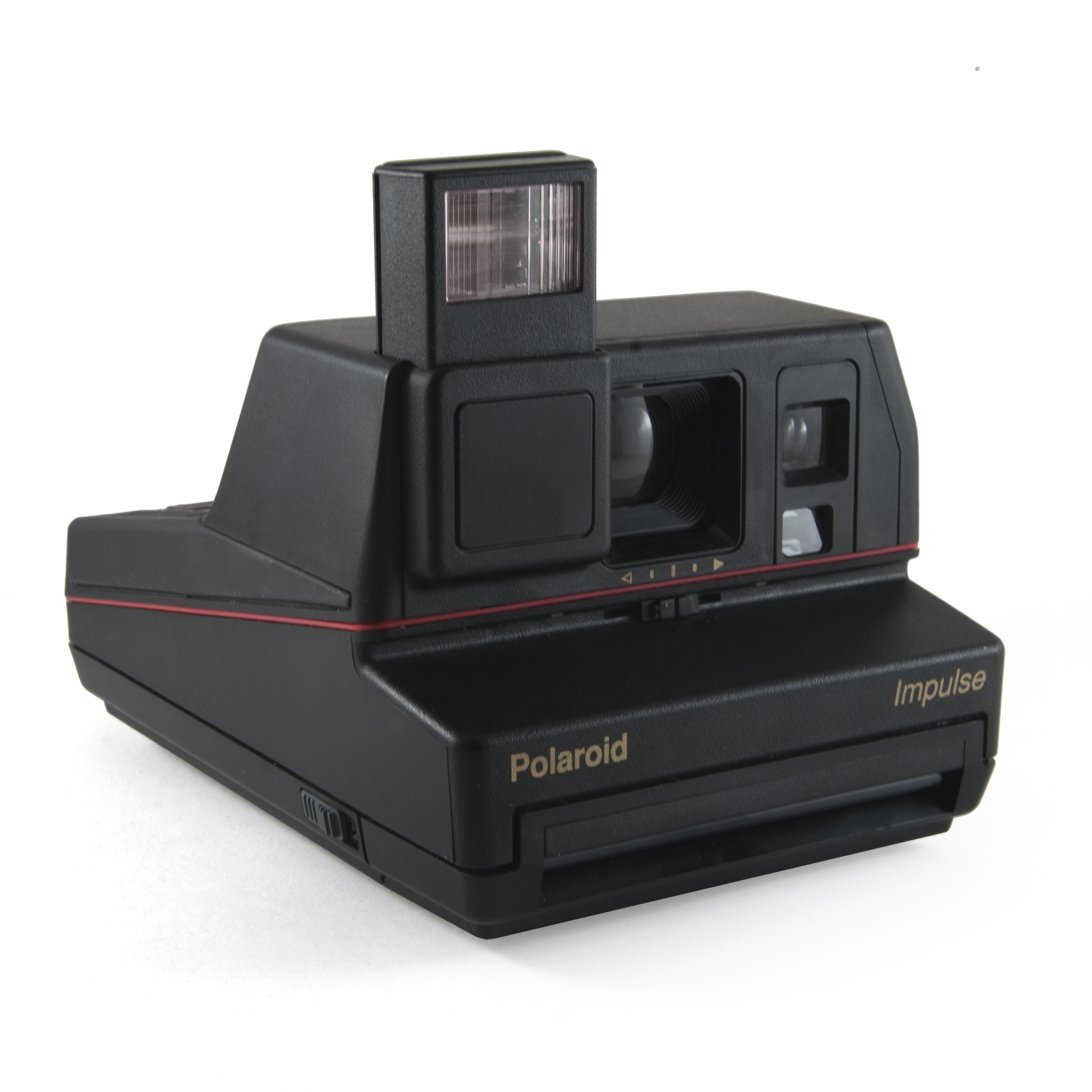
- Polaroid Impulse, anthracite black

Overview
- Maker: Polaroid Corporation
- Type: 3-element 116mm f/9.4 plastic lens
- Production: 1988–1994

Sensor/medium
- Film format: 600 series
- Film size: 79 mm × 79 mm (3 1/8 in × 3 1/8 in)
- Film speed: 640
- Recording medium: Instant film
- Film advance: Automatic

Focusing
- Focus: Manual; Automatic (on Sonar models)

The Polaroid Impulse is a camera produced by Polaroid Corporation between 1988 and 1994. The camera uses Polaroid's 600-series integral film. The Impulse is distinguished from Polaroid's other 600-series cameras by its always-on flash, binocular-style grips, larger viewfinder, and self-timer (autofocus models only).

== Models ==
The Polaroid Impulse was manufactured with two different lens configurations. The first featured a fixed-focus lens (sometimes paired with a secondary close-up lens), while the second featured Polaroid's sonar autofocus system. Both configurations were released under a variety of names in gray, black, yellow, blue, green, and magenta colorways.

Model	Lens type	Self-timer
Impulse	Fixed-focus	No
Impulse	Fixed-focus with close-up lens	No
Impulse Close-up	Fixed-focus with close-up lens	No
Impulse CL	Fixed-focus with close-up lens	No
Impulse Portrait	Fixed-focus with close-up lens	No
Impulse AF*	Autofocus	Yes
Impulse SE	Fixed-focus	No
Impulse SE	Fixed-focus with close-up lens	No
Impulse SE	Autofocus	Yes
Impulse QPS	Fixed-focus	No
Impulse QPS	Fixed-focus with close-up lens	No

*Some versions of the Impulse AF include a remote control port, compatible with the Polaroid Spectra System Remote Control.
