= List of Polaroid instant cameras =

This is a list of the instant cameras sold by the Polaroid Corporation as well as new models sold by Polaroid B.V. Cameras are ordered by type.

== Overview ==
Polaroid instant film types
Type	Series	Image area	Years
Roll	40	83 mm × 108 mm (3 1/4 in × 4 1/4 in)	
Roll	30, 20	64 mm × 83 mm (2 1/2 in × 3 1/4 in)	
Pack	100	72 mm × 95 mm (2 7/8 in × 3 3/4 in)	
Pack	80	69 mm × 72 mm (2 3/4 in × 2 7/8 in)	
Integral	SX-70, 600, i-Type	78.94 mm × 76.8 mm (3 1/8 in × 3 in)	
Integral	Spectra	90 mm × 73 mm (3 1/2 in × 2 7/8 in)	
Integral	500 / Captiva	73 mm × 54 mm (2 7/8 in × 2 1/8 in)	
Integral	i-Zone	24 mm × 36 mm (1 in × 1 3/8 in)	
Integral	Go	47 mm × 46 mm (1 7/8 in × 1 3/4 in)	2023

== Roll film ==
Polaroid Picture Roll Land film cameras

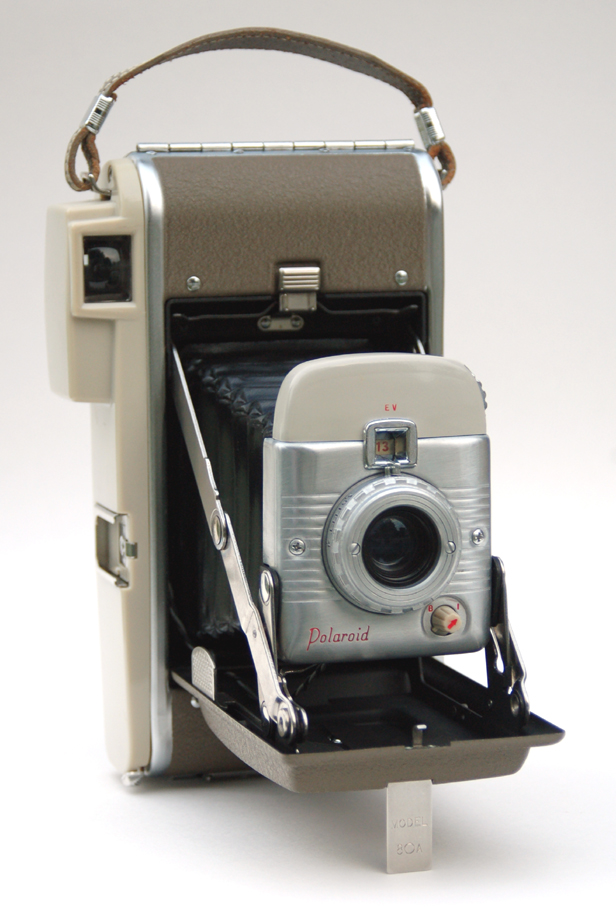
Polaroid Highlander Model 80A

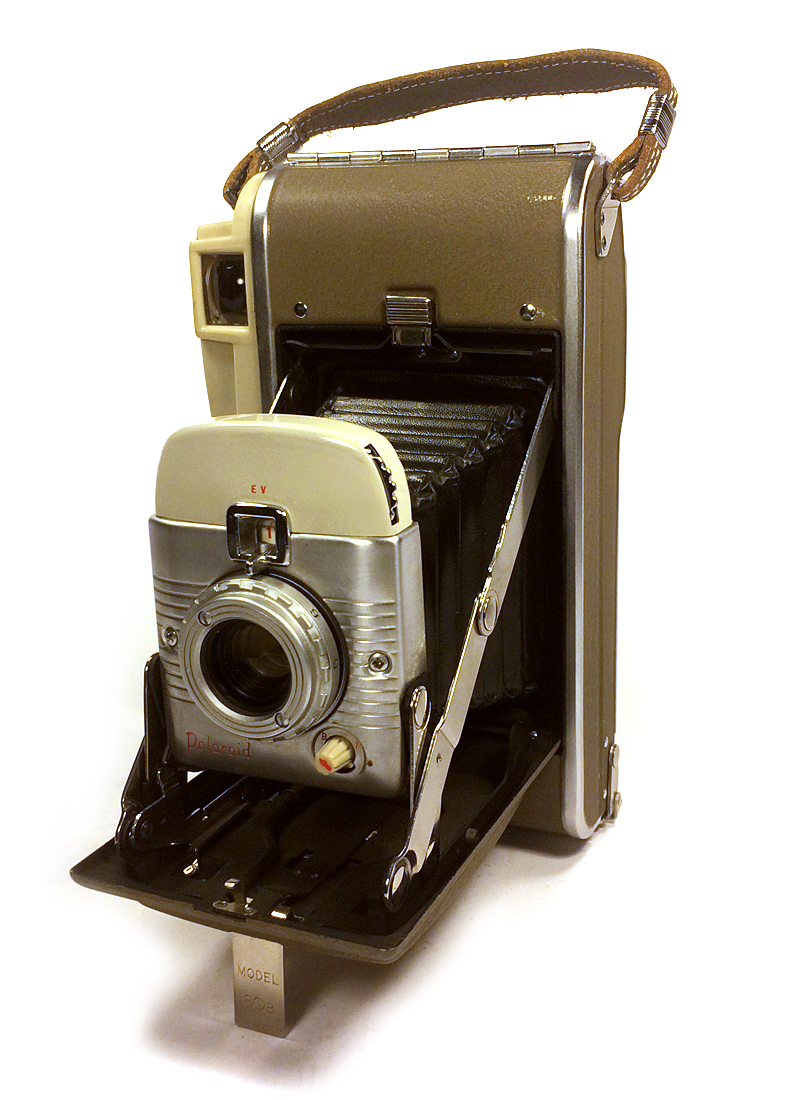
Polaroid Land Camera model 80B

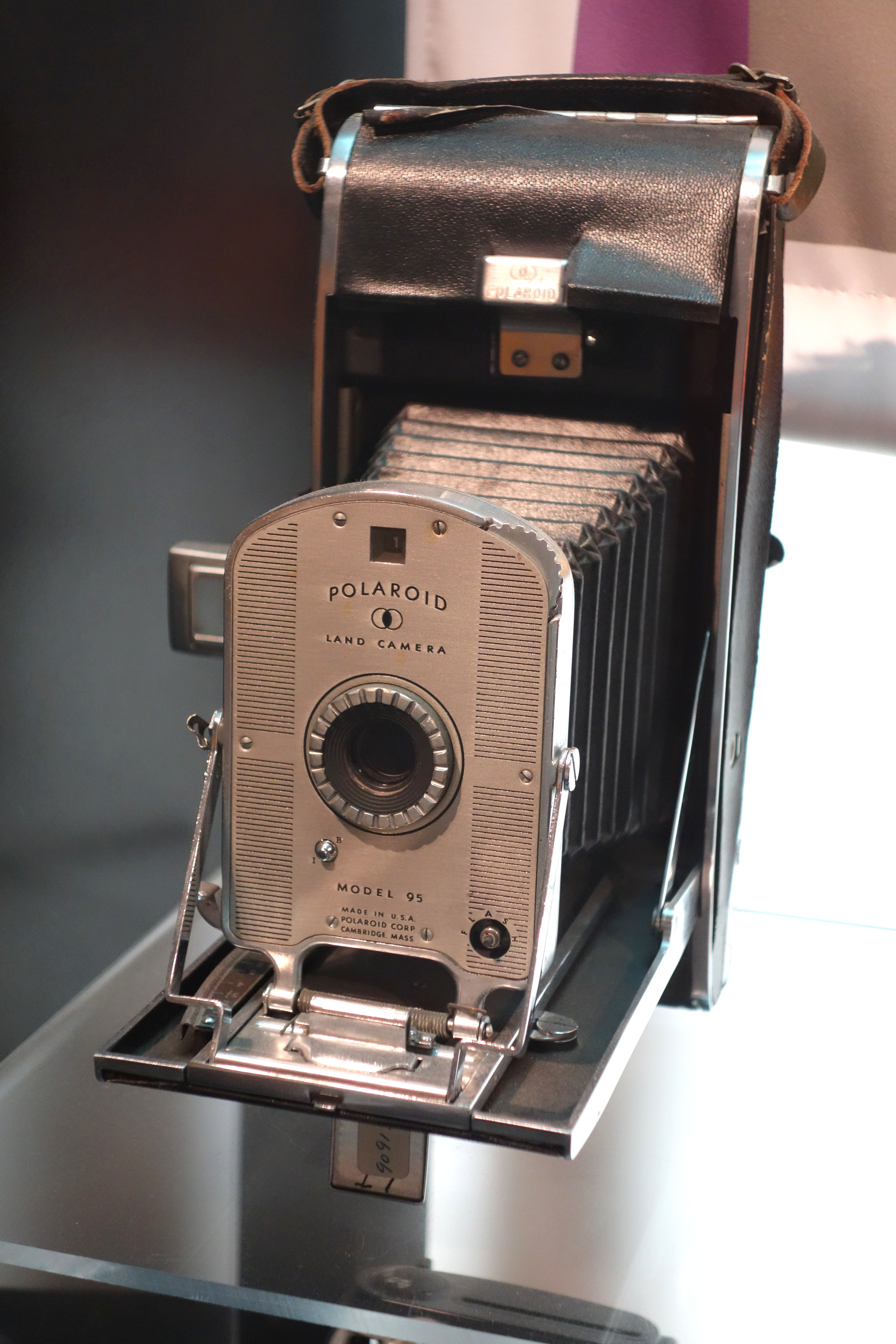
Polaroid Model 95

These cameras took Polaroid Picture Roll Land film, which was discontinued in 1992. Some of these cameras can be converted to take pack film, but others cannot.

- 40 Series (3.25 × 4.25-inch, 83 × 108 mm)
  - Model 95 (1948–1953)
  - Model 95A "Speedliner" (1954–1957)
  - Model 95B "Speedliner" (1957–1961)
  - Model 100 "One Hundred" (1954–1957)
  - Model 110 "Pathfinder" (1952–1957)
  - Model 110A "Pathfinder" (1957–1960)
  - Model 110B "Pathfinder" (1960–1964)
  - Model 120 (1961–1965)
  - Model 150 (1957–1960)
  - Model 160 (1962–1965)
  - Model 700 (1955–1957)
  - Model 800 "The 800" (1957–1962)
  - Model 850 (1961–1963)
  - Model 900 (1960–1963)
  - Model J66 (1961–1963)
- 30 Series (2.5 × 3.25-inch, 64 × 83 mm)
  - Model 80 "Highlander" (1954–1957)
  - Model 80A "Highlander" (1957–1959)
  - Model 80B "Highlander" (1959–1961)
  - Model J33 (1961–1963)
- 20 Series (2.5 × 3.25-inch, 64 × 83 mm)
  - Model 20 "Swinger" (1965–1970)
  - Model M15 "Swinger Sentinel"
  - Swinger II

== Pack film (colorpack) ==
- 100 Series (2.875 × 3.75-inch, 72 × 95 mm)
  - 100 Series folding cameras
    - Model 100 (1963–1966)
    - Model 101 (1964–1967)
    - Model 102 (1964–1967)^{[1]}
    - Model 103 (1965–1967)
    - Model 104 (1965–1967)
    - Model 125 (1965–1967)^{[1]}
    - Model 135 (1965–1967)^{[1]}
  - 200 Series folding cameras
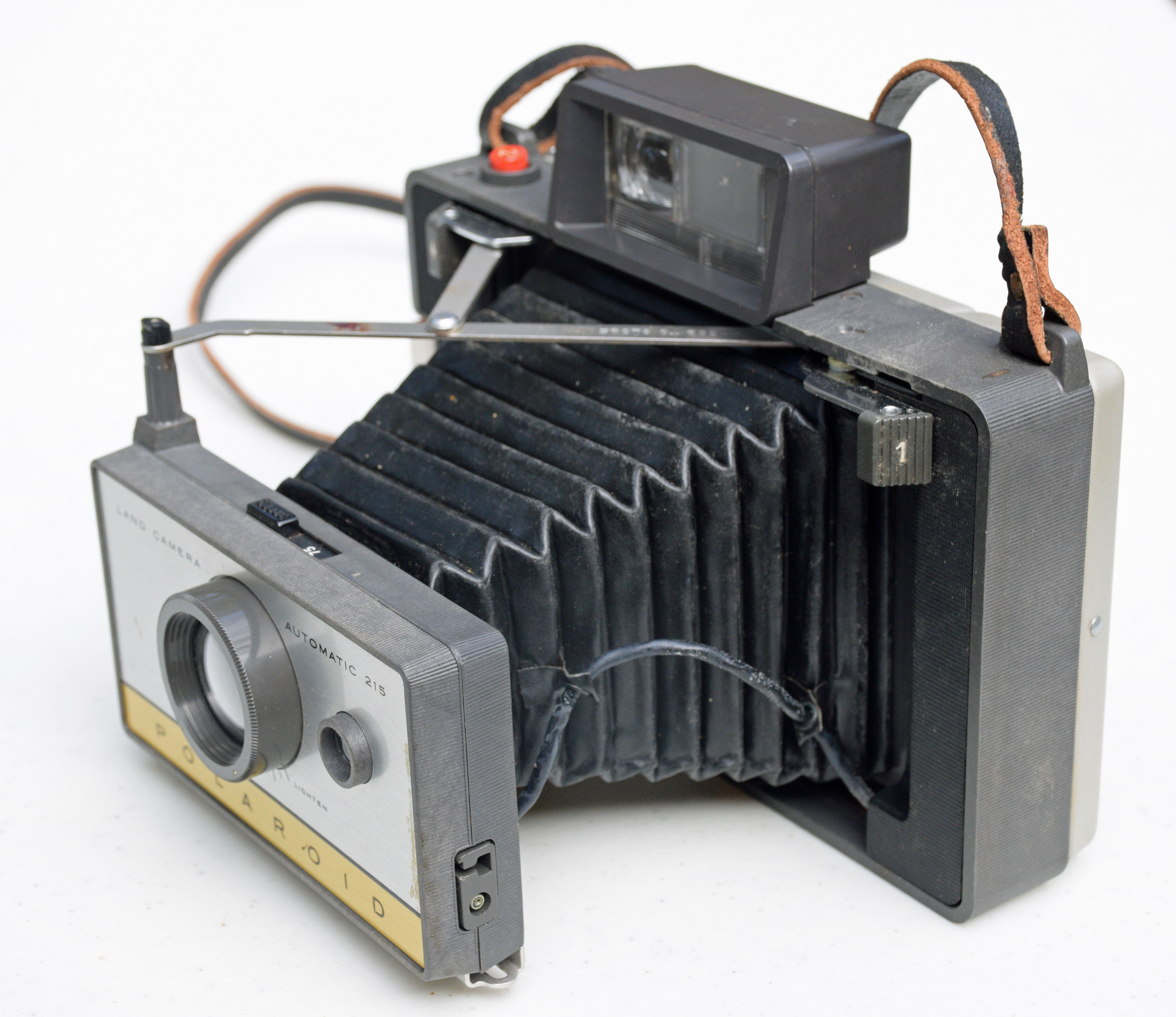
    Polaroid model 215
    - Model 210 (1967–1969)
    - Model 215 (1968–1970)^{[1]}
    - Model 220 (1967–1969)
    - Model 225 (1968–1970)^{[1]}
    - Model 230 (1967–1969)
    - Model 240 (1967–1969)
    - Model 250 (1967–1969)
  - 300 Series folding cameras
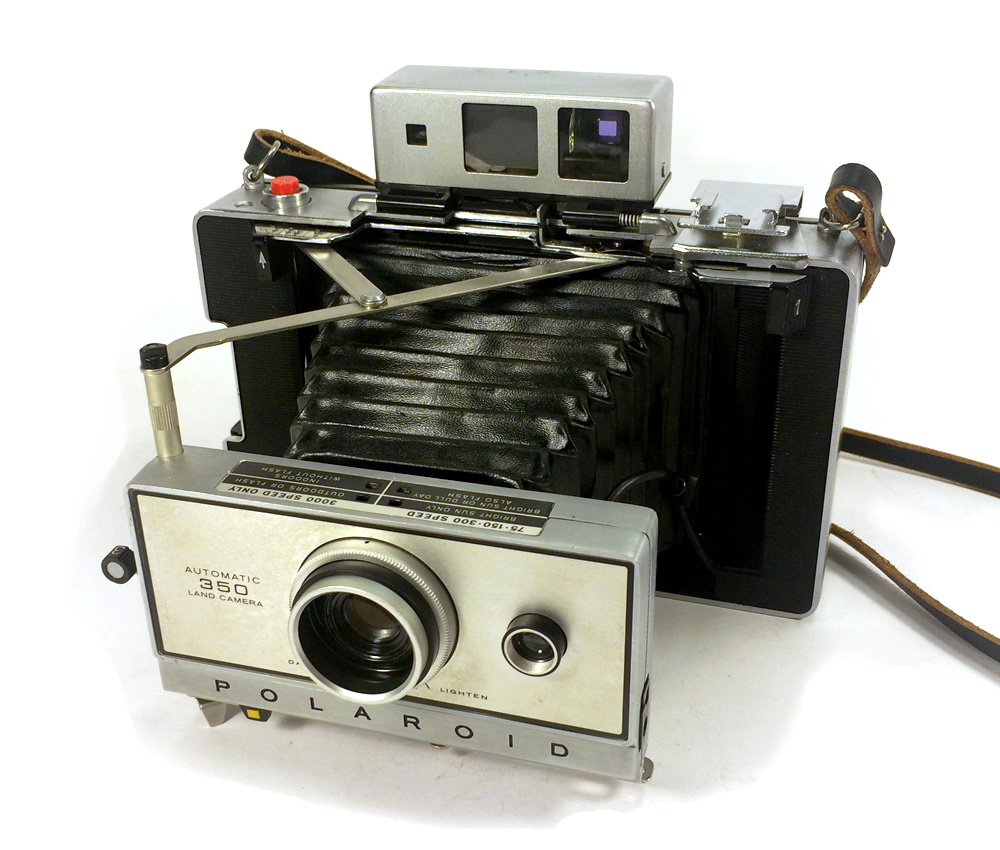
    Polaroid Automatic 350 instant camera, made from 1969 to 1971, list price $150
    - Model 315 (1969–1971)^{[1]}
    - Model 320 (1969–1971)
    - Model 325 (1969–1971)^{[1]}
    - Model 330 (1969–1971)
    - Model 335 (1969–1971)^{[1]}
    - Model 340 (1969–1971)
    - Model 350 (1969–1971)
    - Model 355 (1975)^{[2]}
    - Model 360 (1969–1971)
    - Countdown M60 (1970)^{[1]}
    - Countdown M80 (1970)^{[1]}
  - 400 Series folding cameras
    - Model 420 (1971–1977)
    - Model 430 (1971–1977)
    - Model 440 (1971–1976)
    - Model 450 (1971–1974)
    - Model 455 (1975–1976)^{[2]}
    - Countdown 70 (1971–1973)^{[1]}
    - Countdown 90 (1971–1973)^{[1]}
  - Other folding cameras
    - Model 180 (1965–1969)
    - Model 185
    - Model 185 Millennium (2000–)^{[2]}
    - Model 190 (1974–1977)^{[2]}
    - Model 195 (1974–1976)^{[6]}
    - The Reporter (1977)^{[3] [6]}
    - EE100 (1977)^{[3]}
    - EE100 Special^{[3]}
    - ProPack^{[3]}
  - Non-folding cameras
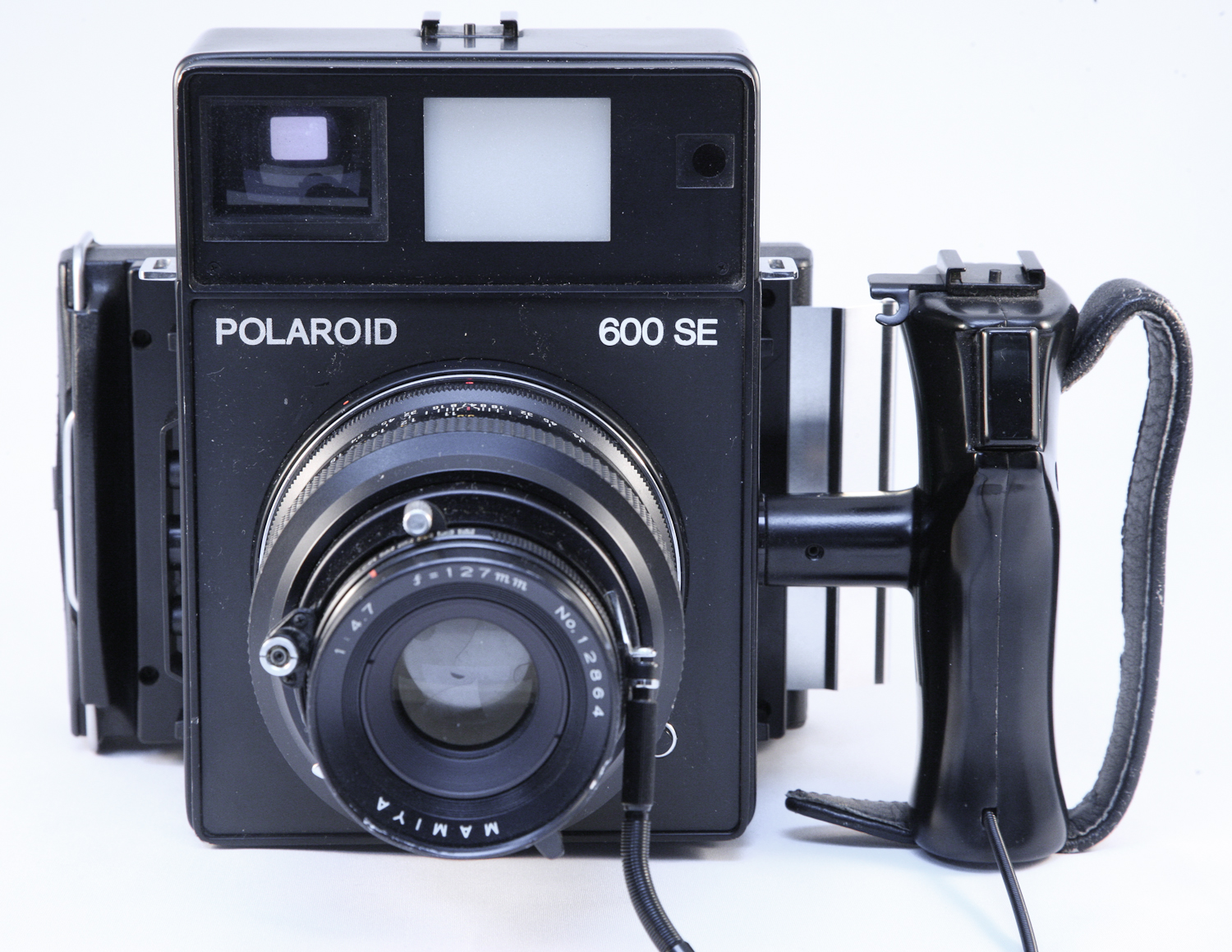
    Polaroid 600 SE, manufactured by Mamiya
    - 600 (1978)^{[2]}
    - 600 SE (1978)
    - Model 3000 "Big Swinger" (1968–1970)
    - Big Shot (1971–1973)
    - Clincher (1975)^{[1] [3]}
    - Clincher 2^{[1] [3]}
    - The Colorpack (1973–1975)
    - Colorpack II (1969–1972)
    - Colorpack III (1970–1971)
    - Colorpack IV (1969–1971)^{[1]}
    - Colorpack V "CP5" (1973–1975)^{[1]}
    - Colorpack 100 (1975–1976)^{[2]}
    - Colorpack 200 (1977–1978)^{[2] [3]}
    - Colorpack M6 (1970–1971)
    - EE55 (1976–1977)^{[2] [3]}
    - EE58 (1977–1978)^{[2] [3]}
    - EE60 (1976–1977)^{[2] [3]}
    - EE66 (1976–1977)^{[2] [3]}
    - Instant 30 (1978)^{[2] [3]}
    - Memory Maker^{[1]}
    - Minute Maker (1977)^{[3] [4]}
    - Minute Maker Plus (1977–1978)^{[3] [6]}
    - Super Colorpack (1971–1972)
    - Super Colorpack IV (1971–1972)^{[1]}
    - Super Colour Swinger III (1976–1978)^{[2] [3]}
    - Super Shooter (1975–1977)^{[3] [6]}
    - Super Shooter Plus (1975–1977)^{[3]}
- 80 Series (2.75 × 2.875-inch, 69 × 72 mm)
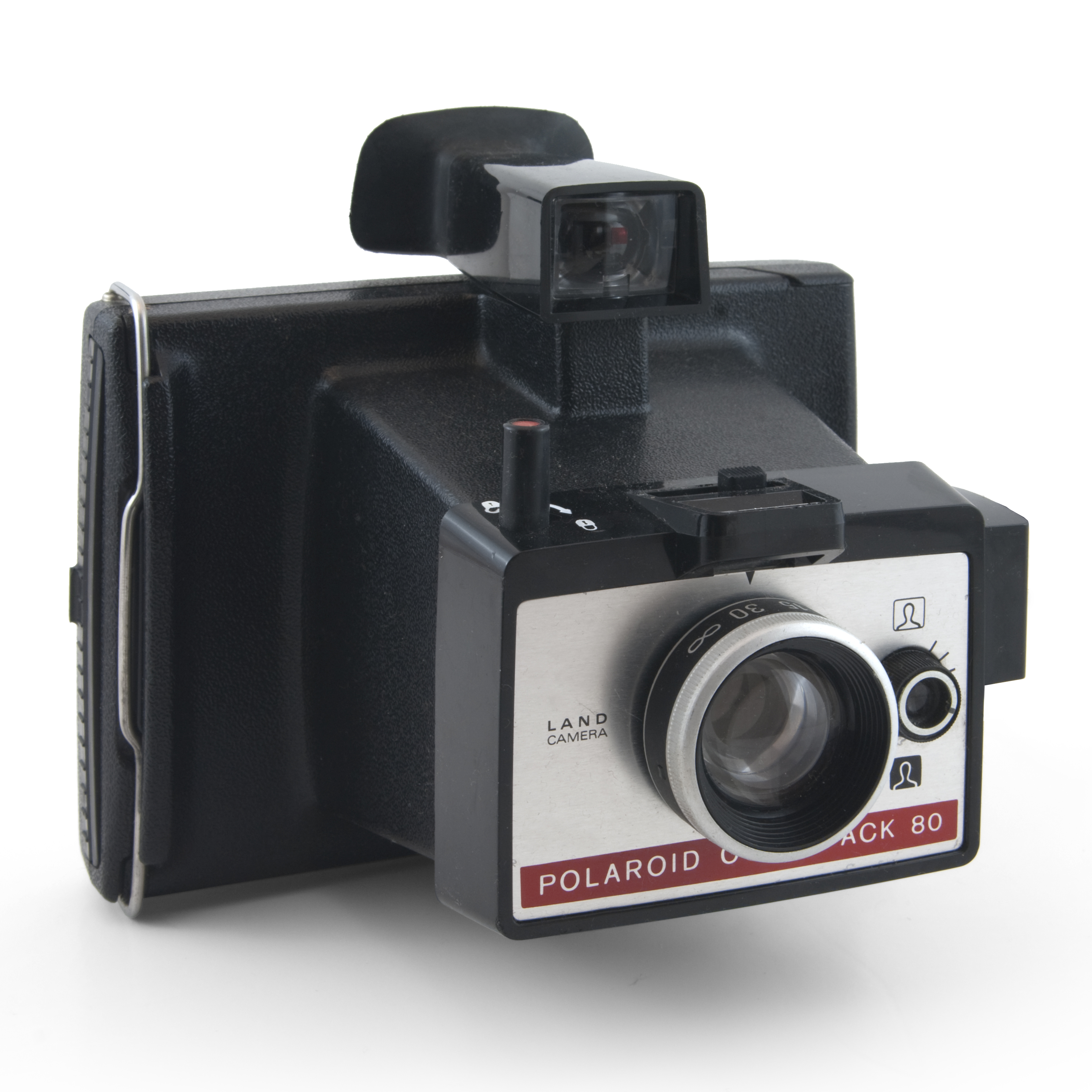
  Polaroid Colorpack 80
  - Colorpack 80 (1971–1976)^{[2]}
  - Colorpack 82 (1971–1975)^{[2]}
  - Colorpack 85 (1971–1975)^{[2]}
  - Colorpack 88 (1971–1975)^{[2]}
  - Colour Swinger (1975–1978)^{[2]}
  - Colour Swinger II (1975)^{[2]}
  - EE22 (1976–1977)^{[2]}
  - EE33 (1976–1977)^{[2]}
  - EE38 (1977–1978)^{[2]}
  - EE44 (1976–1977)^{[2]}
  - EE88 (1976)^{[2]}
  - Electric Zip (1975–1978)
  - Instant 10 (1978)^{[2]}
  - Instant 20 (1978)^{[2]}
  - Square Shooter (1971–1972)
  - Square Shooter 2 (1972–1975)
  - Square Shooter 4 (1972–1975)^{[1]}
  - Super Colour Swinger (1975–1977)^{[2]}
  - Super Colour Swinger II (1975–1978)^{[2]}
  - Super Swinger^{[2]}
  - Swinger EE (1976–1978)^{[2]}
  - Zip (1974–1977)
  - Viva with electronic flash No.M1183 (1984) for Caribbean market

== Integral film ==
=== SX-70 ===
These cameras included both folding SLRs and less expensive nonfolding models. They take the SX-70 film, a format with a ~3.1 × 3.1 in^{2} (77 × 77 mm) square image area and a ~4.2 × 3.5 in^{2} (108 × 88 mm^{2}) total area, and a sensitivity around ISO 160. The film has a built-in 6-volt zinc chloride "PolaPulse" battery pack, replaced with a lithium-ion pack in Polaroid B.V. remakes.

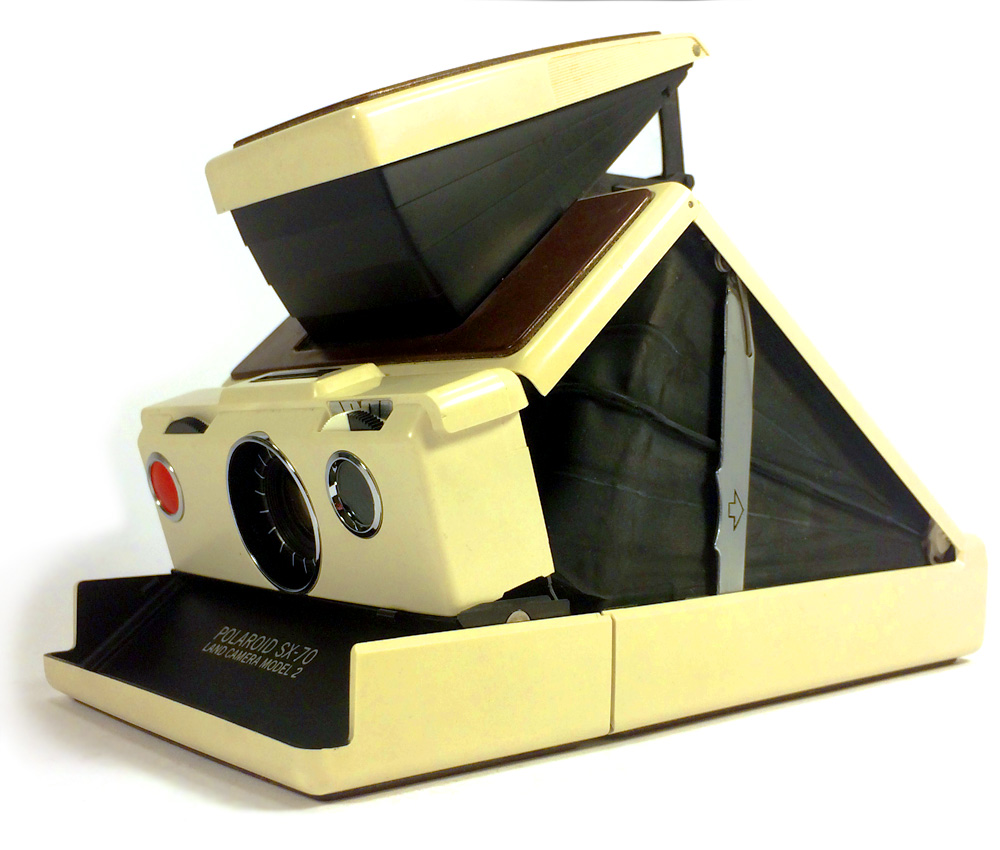
Polaroid SX-70 Land Camera model 2 instant camera

- Folding cameras
  - SX-70 (1972–1977)
  - SX-70 Alpha 1 (1977)
  - SX-70 Alpha 1 Executive (1977)^{[1]}
  - SX-70 Alpha 1 24 Kt Gold Mildred Scheel
  - SX-70 Alpha 1 Model 2 (1977)
  - SX-70 Executive (1975–1977)^{[1]}
  - SX-70 Model 2 (1974–1977)
  - SX-70 Model 3 (1975–1978)
  - SX-70 Sonar OneStep (1978)
  - SX-70 Sonar OneStep Gold
  - TimeZero SX-70 AutoFocus (1981)
  - TimeZero SX-70 AutoFocus Model 2 (1981)
- Non-folding cameras
  - Model 500^{[2]}
  - Model 1000 (1977)^{[2]}
  - Model 1000 S^{[2]}
  - Model 1000 SE
  - Model 1500 (1977)^{[2]}
  - Model 2000 (1976)^{[2]}
  - Model 3000 (1977)^{[2]}
  - Encore (1977)^{[1]}
  - Instant 1000^{[2]}
  - Instant 1000 DeLuxe^{[2]}
  - OneStep (1977)^{[4] [5] [6]}
  - OneStep Plus^{[1]}
  - Presto! (1978)^{[1]}
  - Pronto! (1976–1977)^{[4] [5] [6]}
  - Pronto! B (1977)
  - Pronto! Extra (1977–1978)
  - Pronto! Plus (1976–1977)
  - Pronto! RF (1977)^{[4] [5] [6]}
  - Pronto! S (1976–1977)^{[1]}
  - Pronto! SM (1976–1977)^{[1]}
  - Pronto! Sonar OneStep (1978)^{[5]}
  - Sonar AutoFocus 5000^{[2]}
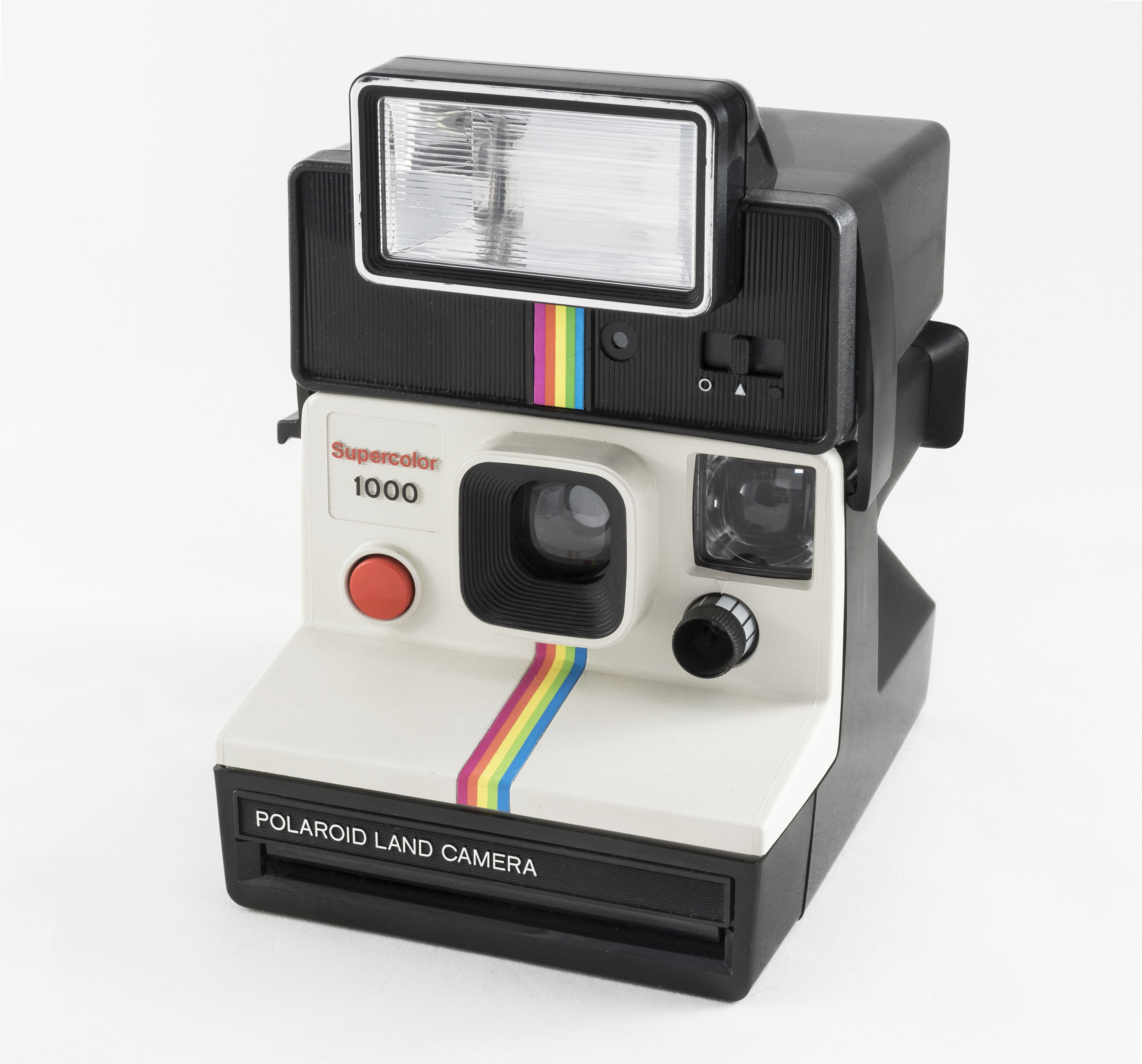
    Supercolor 1000
  - Super Clincher^{[1]}
  - Supercolor 1000^{[2]}
  - Supercolor 1000 DeLuxe^{[2]}
  - Supercolor AutoFocus^{[2]}
  - Supercolor AutoFocus 3500^{[2]}
  - The Button (1981)
  - TimeZero OneStep (1981)
  - TimeZero Pronto AF (1981)

=== 600 ===
Polaroid SLR 690

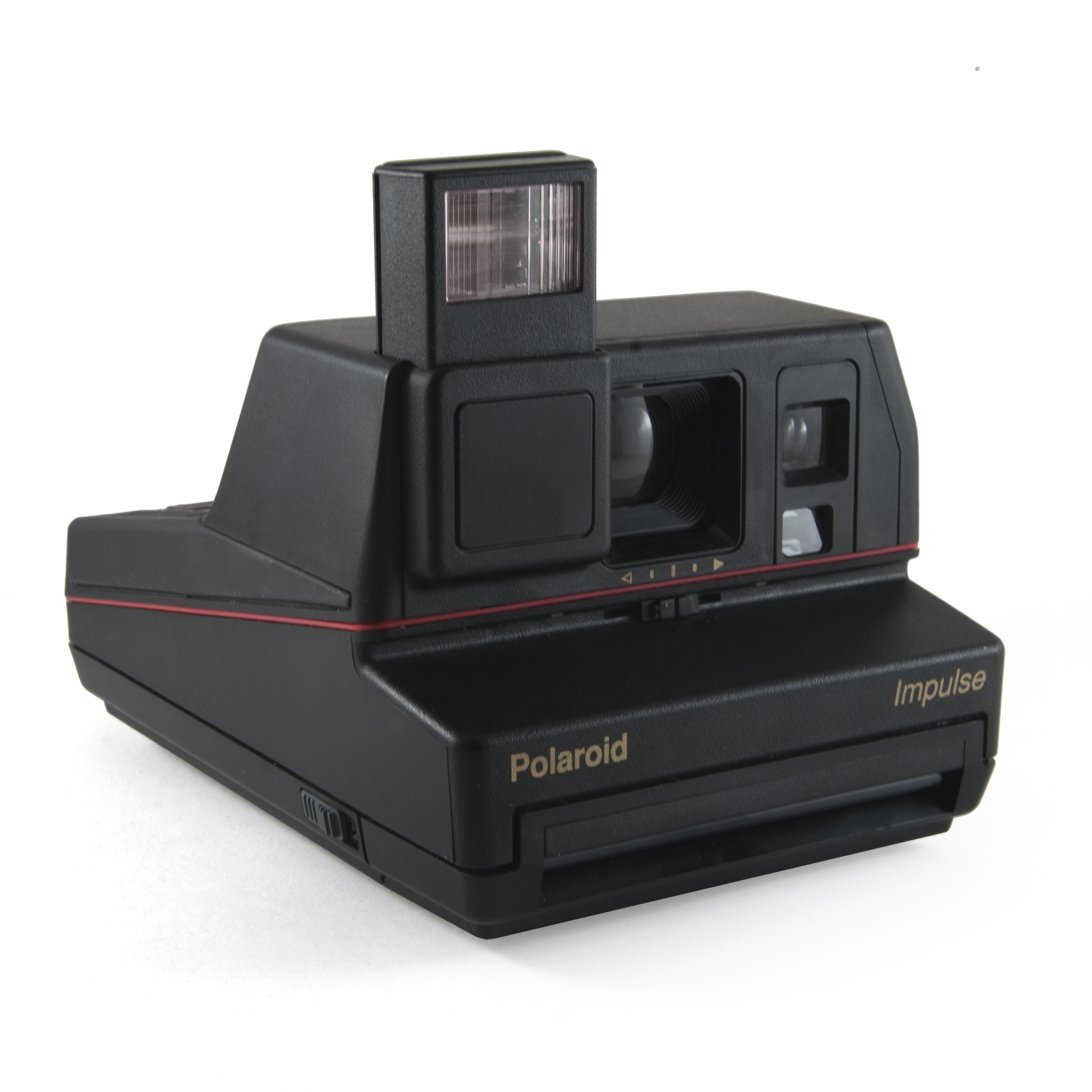
Polaroid Impulse

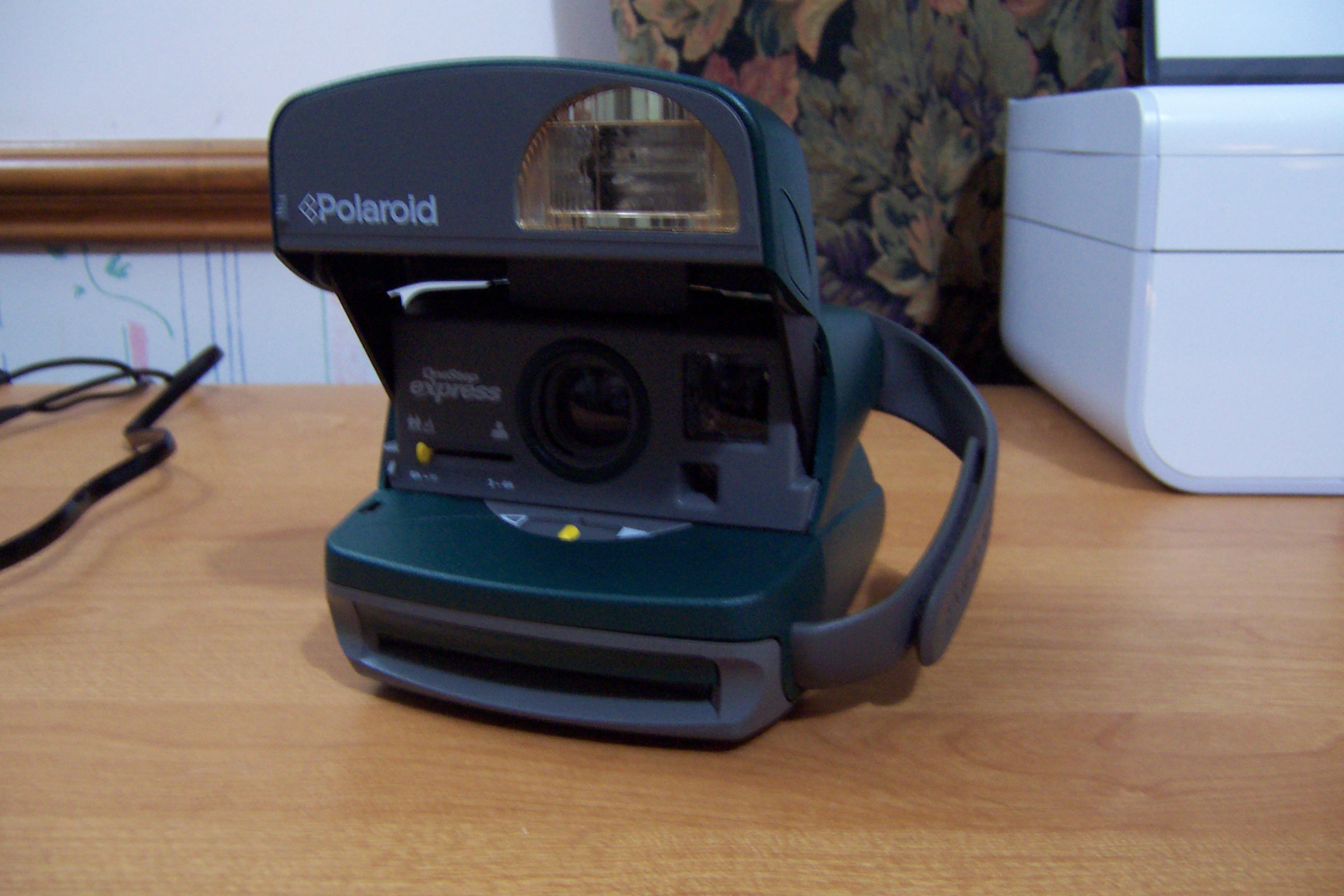
Polaroid OneStep 600 Express

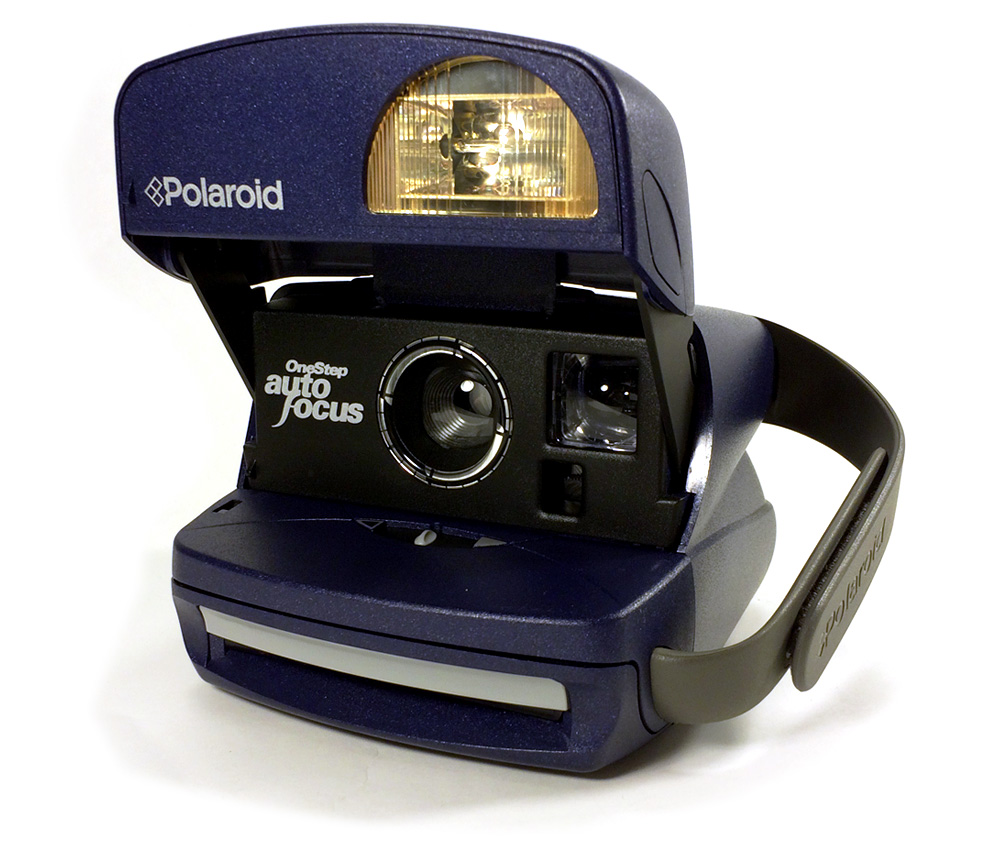
Polaroid OneStep Autofocus SE

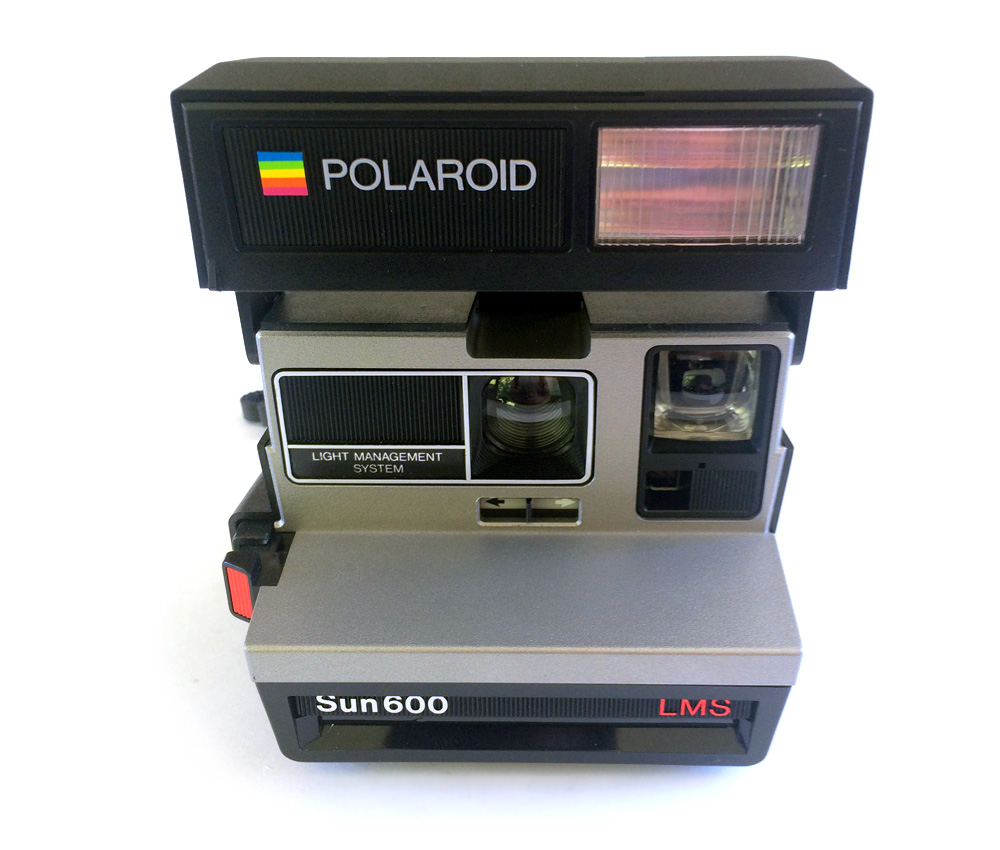
Polaroid Sun 600 LMS instant camera

The 600 film have the same dimensions as that of the SX-70. The sensitivity is higher at around ISO 640. It also has a battery pack, for which Polaroid has released a small radio.

- 600 (2000s)
- 600 Business Edition
- 600 Business Edition 2 (2000–)
- 636 Double Exposure
- 636 CloseUp (1996)
- Amigo 610
- Amigo 620 (1982)
- Barbie Instant Camera (1999–2001)
- Bicentennial "We The People" (1987)
- Cool Cam (1988)
- Construction Camera
- Impulse (1988)
- Impulse AF (1988)
- Impulse QPS
- JobPro (1992)
- JobPro 2 (2000–)
- NightCam
- One (2003)
- One600 Classic (2004)
- One600 Pro (2004)
- One600 JobPro (2004)
- One600 Ultra (2004)
- One600 Nero (2004)^{[1]}
- One600 Panna (2005)^{[1]}
- One600 Rossa (2004)^{[1]}
- OneStep 600 (1983)
- OneStep 600 Express (1997–2002)
- OneStep 600 Flash
- OneStep 600 Flash Close-Up (just OneStep after 1998)
- OneStep AF (1997–)
- OneStep Silver Express
- OneStep Talking Camera (1997–1998)
- P-Cam
- Pronto 600^{[2]}
- Quick 610
- Revue 600
- SLR 680 (1982–1987)^{[6]}
- SLR 690 (1998)
- Spice Cam (1997)
- Spirit^{[1]}
- Spirit 600^{[1]}
- Spirit 600 CL^{[1]}
- Sun 600 LMS (1983)
- Lightmixer 630
- Sun 635 SE
- Sun 640 (1981)
- Sun 650 (1982)
- Sun 660 (1981)
- Revue Autofocus 660
- Supercolor 600
- Supercolor 635^{[2]}
- Supercolor 635 CL^{[2]}
- Supercolor 645 CL^{[2]}
- Supercolor 670 AF^{[2]}
- Supercolor Elite^{[1]}
- Taz Instant Camera (1999–2001)
- Hello Kitty Instant Camera

=== Spectra ===
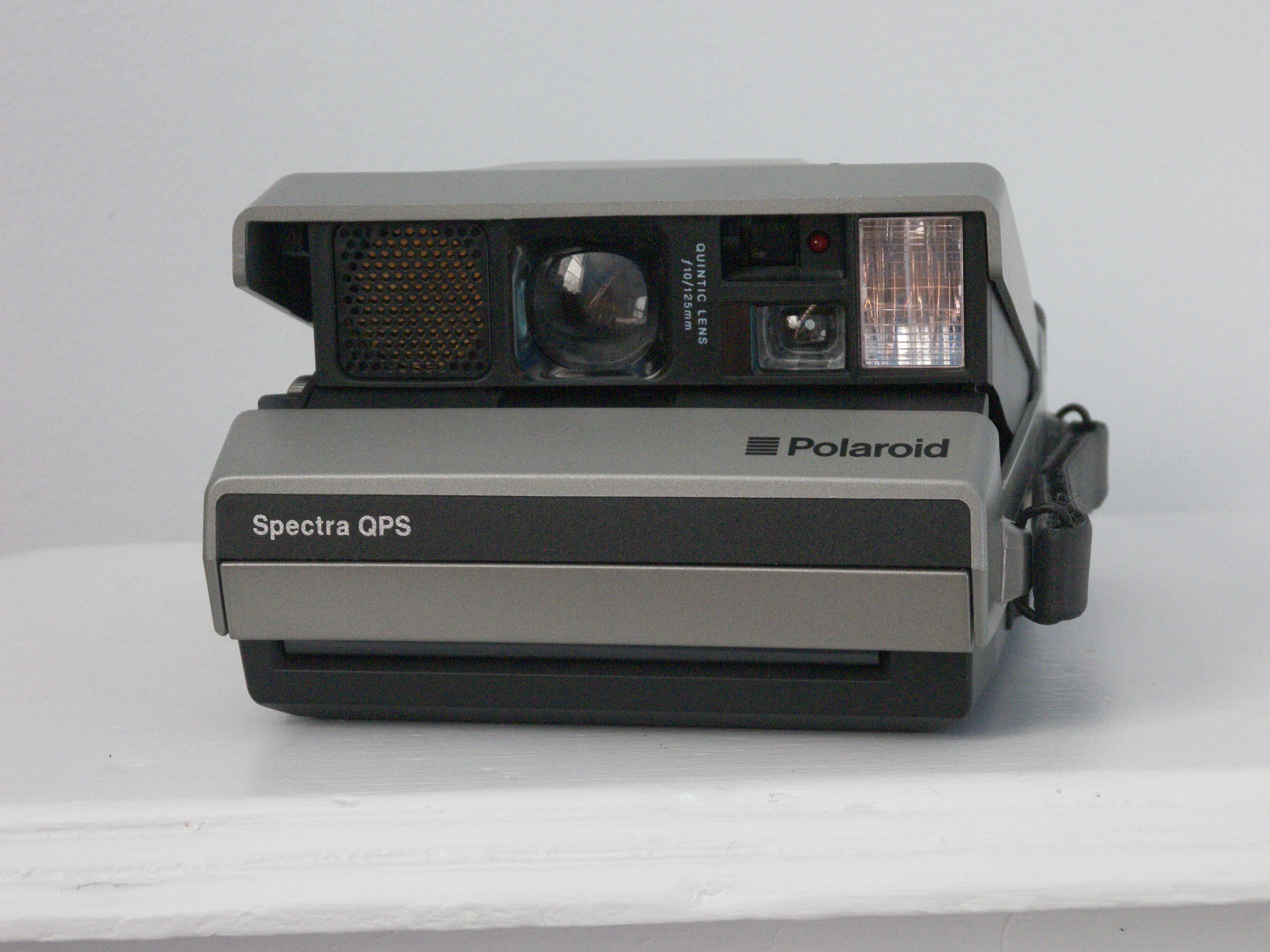
Polaroid Spectra QPS

The Spectra has an image area of 2.9 × 3.6 in^{2} (73 × 91 mm^{2}) and a total area of 4.05 × 4.0 in^{2} (103 × 102 mm^{2}).

- Image^{[2]}
- Image 2^{[2]}
- Image1200 (2004)
- Image Elite Pro^{[2]}
- Macro 5 SLR
- Image Pro (1995)
- Minolta Instant Pro (1996) Same as Image Pro, Built by Polaroid for Minolta
- Pro Cam (1996–2000)
- Spectra (1986)^{[6]}
- Spectra 2
- Spectra 1200i (2000–)
- Spectra 1200si (2000–)
- Spectra 1200FF (2001)
- Spectra Onyx (1987)
- Spectra Pro (1990–1998)

=== Captiva ===
- Captiva (1993–1997)
- JoyCam (1999)
- PopShots (1999–2001)
- Vision (1993)
- Vision date:+ (1993–1997)
- P-500 Digital Photo Printer

=== Pocket cameras ===
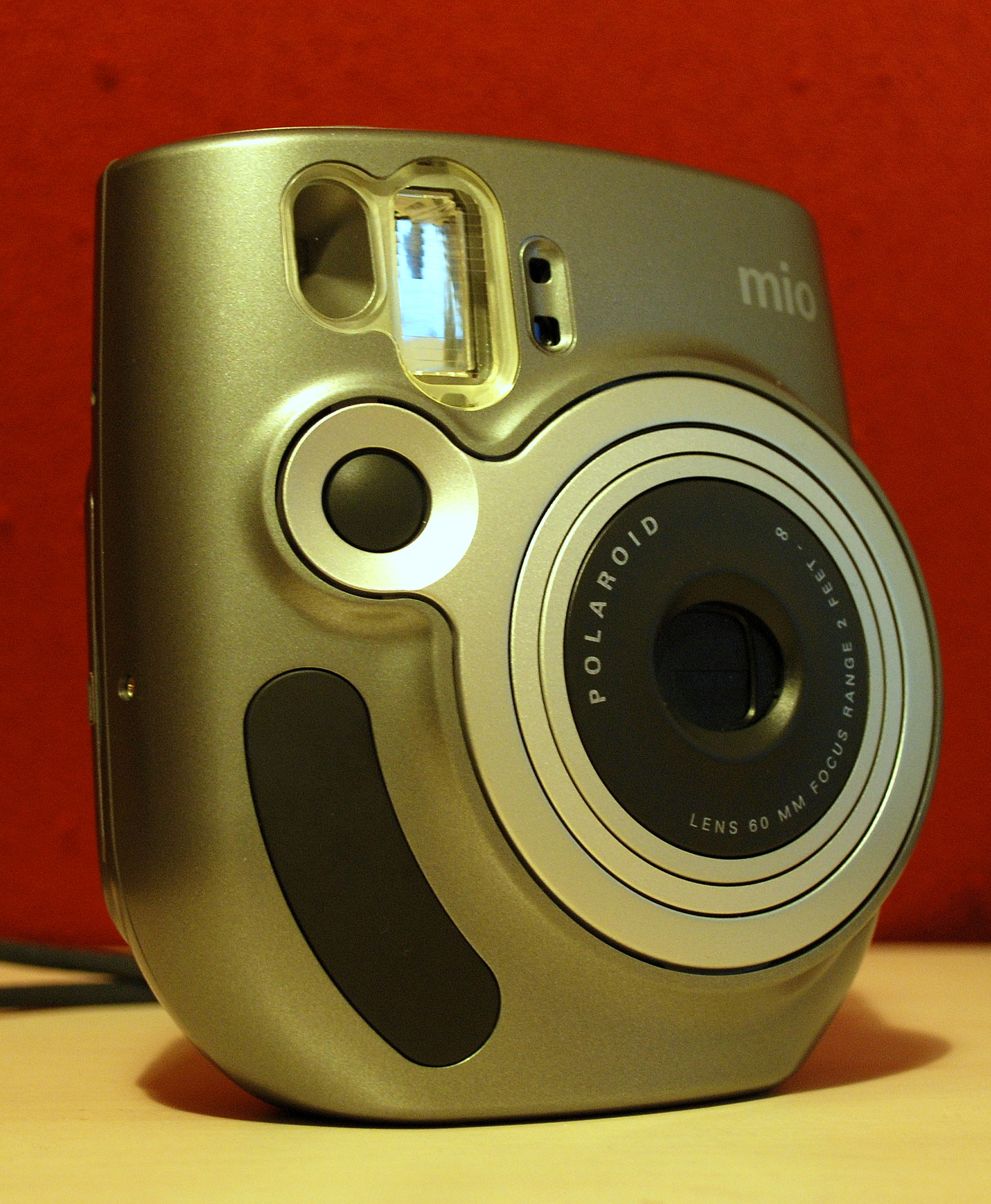
Polaroid Mio

- i-Zone (1999)
- izone200 (2001–2005)
- i-Zone Convertible (2001–2002)
- i-Zone Digital Combo (2000–2001)
- i-Zone with Radio (2001–2002)
- Mio (2001) - FUJIFILM Instax Mini compatible.
- Xiao (1997)^{[2]}
- Polaroid Go (2021)

=== i-Type cameras ===
The i-Type is a new film format introduced by Polaroid B.V. It is Polaroid 600 film with the battery moved from the film pack and into the camera. All of the following cameras include a flash.

- Impossible Camera (later Polaroid)
  - Impossible I-1 (2016) – designed by Teenage Engineering; automatically selects between five fixed-focus lenses: macro, close-up, near, mid and far (82–109 mm); ring flash; tripod socket; additional features are available via a smartphone app (remote trigger, self timer, double exposure, noise trigger, light painting, color paint and manual control of aperture, shutter speed, flash strength and lens)
  - Polaroid I-2 (2023) – one 98 mm f/8 lens with lidar autofocus; shooting modes available from the camera itself include automatic, shutter priority, aperture priority, and fully manual. (Note: lens equivalent to 38mm equivalent angle of view and f/2.8 in 35 mm film or full frame digital format.) Additional features are available using the Polaroid smartphone app. The I-2 shoots I-Type and 600 film and with a setting change it can shoot the SX-70 film.
- Polaroid OneStep
  - Polaroid Originals OneStep 2 (2017) – one 106 mm f/14.6 fixed-focus standard lens The Polaroid Originals OneStep 2 Viewfinder has an upgraded viewfinder.
  - Polaroid Originals OneStep+ (2018), later just Polaroid OneStep+ – manually selectable between two f/12 fixed-focus lenses: standard (103 mm) and portrait (89 mm); tripod socket; additional features are available via a smartphone app (remote trigger, self timer, double exposure, noise trigger, light painting, color paint and manual mode (control of aperture, shutter speed (up to 30 s long exposure and bulb), flash strength and lens)) Discontinued with the release of the Now series in 2020.
- Polaroid Now
  - Polaroid Now (2020) – automatically selects between two fixed-focus lenses: standard (102.35 mm) and portrait (95 mm); dedicated double exposure button
    - Polaroid Now Generation 2 (2023) – updated version of the first generation; production discontinued in February 2025.
    - Polaroid Now Generation 3 (2025)
  - Polaroid Now+ (2021) – automatically selects between two f/11 fixed-focus lenses: standard (102.35 mm) and portrait (95 mm); filters; tripod socket; additional features are available via a smartphone app (e.g. double exposure, light painting, remote trigger, aperture priority/depth of field, tripod mode/long exposure; various manual controls)
    - Polaroid Now+ Generation 2 (2023) – updated version of the first generation of the plus series; production discontinued in February 2025
    - Polaroid Now+ Generation 3 (2025)
- Polaroid Flip
  - Polaroid Flip (2025) – features a four-lens system, autofocus, built-in battery that utilizes a USB-C for recharging, improved flash and is compatible with both i-Type and 600 film. The Flip also features a sonar autofocus system, utilizing a technology that Polaroid first adopted in 1978 with the SX-70 camera.

== Sheet film ==
=== Large-format cameras ===
- 20 × 24" camera (1976)
- 40 × 80" camera at Boston's Museum of Fine Arts (1976)

== Printing units ==
These are units that expose films using a smartphone display. They are optimized for 600/i-Type film packs, although SX-70 is also supported.

- Impossible Instant Lab (2013)
- Impossible Instant Lab Universal (2015)
- Polaroid Lab (2019)

== Notes ==
1. Special markets model.
2. International model, not sold in United States.
3. These cameras can use both 100 and 80 Series film.
4. Specially badged "BC" model for Kmart stores also exists.
5. Specially badged "Sears Special" model for Sears stores also exists.
6. "SE" model also exists.
