= Spice Cam =

Instant camera model

Polaroid 600 Spice Cam Instant Film Camera
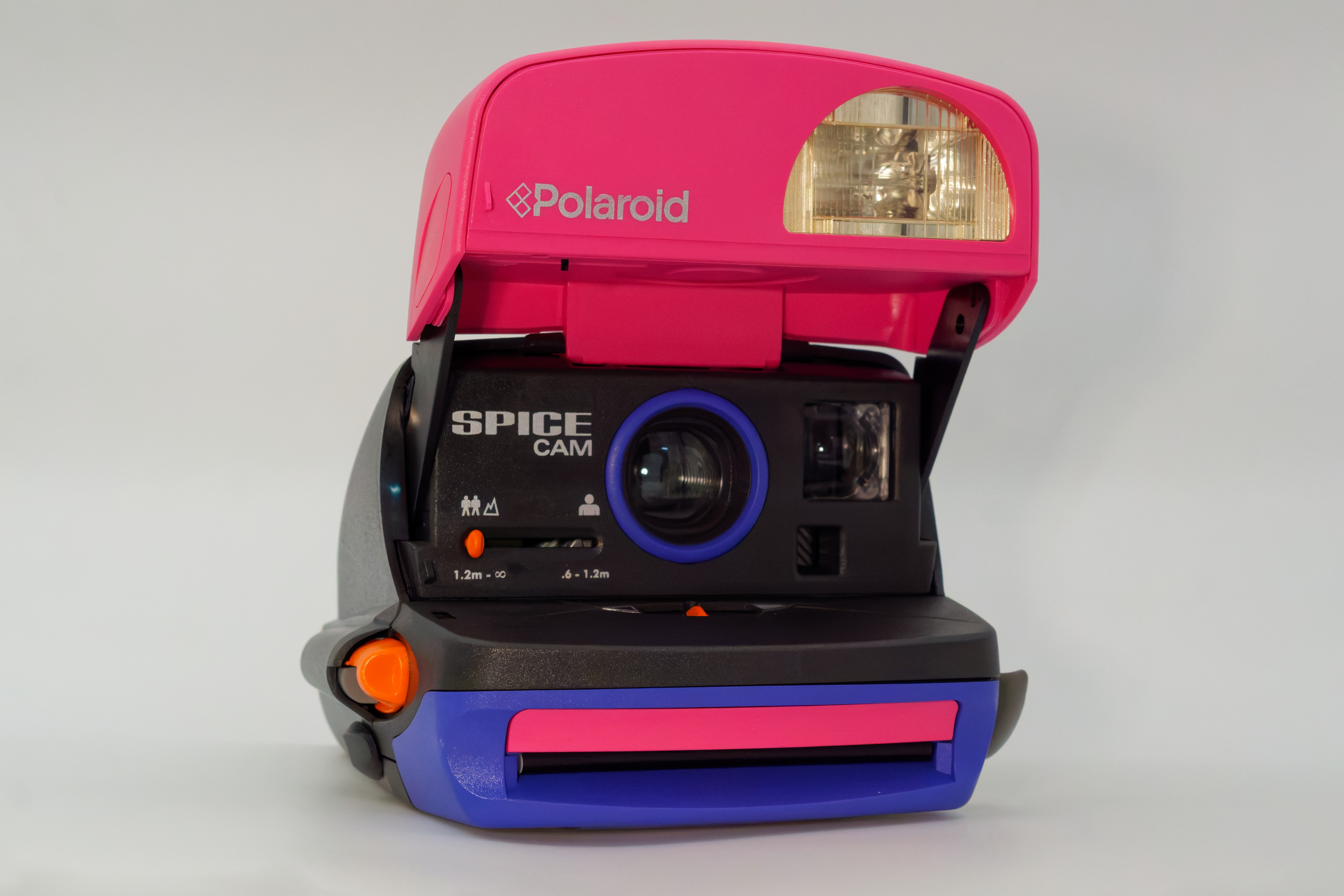

Overview
- Maker: Polaroid Corporation
- Type: Instant camera
- Released: November 1997 (Europe); 1998 (US)
- Intro price: $39.99

Sensor/medium
- Film format: Polaroid 600
- Film size: 3.1 x 3.1 in (no border); 4.2 x 3.5 in (with border)
- Recording medium: Instant film

Chronology
- Predecessor: Polaroid OneStep

The Polaroid 600 Spice Cam Instant Film Camera is an instant camera made by the Polaroid Corporation in association with British girl group the Spice Girls, as part of Polaroid's 600 series.

== History ==
In 1997, Polaroid signed a deal with the Spice Girls to develop the Spice Cam, a variation on the company's OneStep instant camera with brighter colours (purple, pink, orange, and silver) and a new design. The association with the pop group was Polaroid's attempt to appeal to a younger demographic, and the camera came with customizable Spice Girls stickers and labels. The Spice Cam was sold in record stores in addition to traditional camera outlets. Polaroid used the Spice Cam to promote its new 'Extreme 600' film format.

The Spice Cam was Polaroid's first camera to be named after a group or person. The Spice Girls filmed television adverts and conducted a number of promotional photoshoots for the camera. The camera was also exhibited at the 1998 Photo Marketing Association Show.

The Spice Cam was sold in the United States, Europe, Asia and Australia. Cox News Service said of the camera, "like the fun-loving quintet, SpiceCam has more style than substance."
