= List of the Spice Girls live performances =

Spice Girls live performances
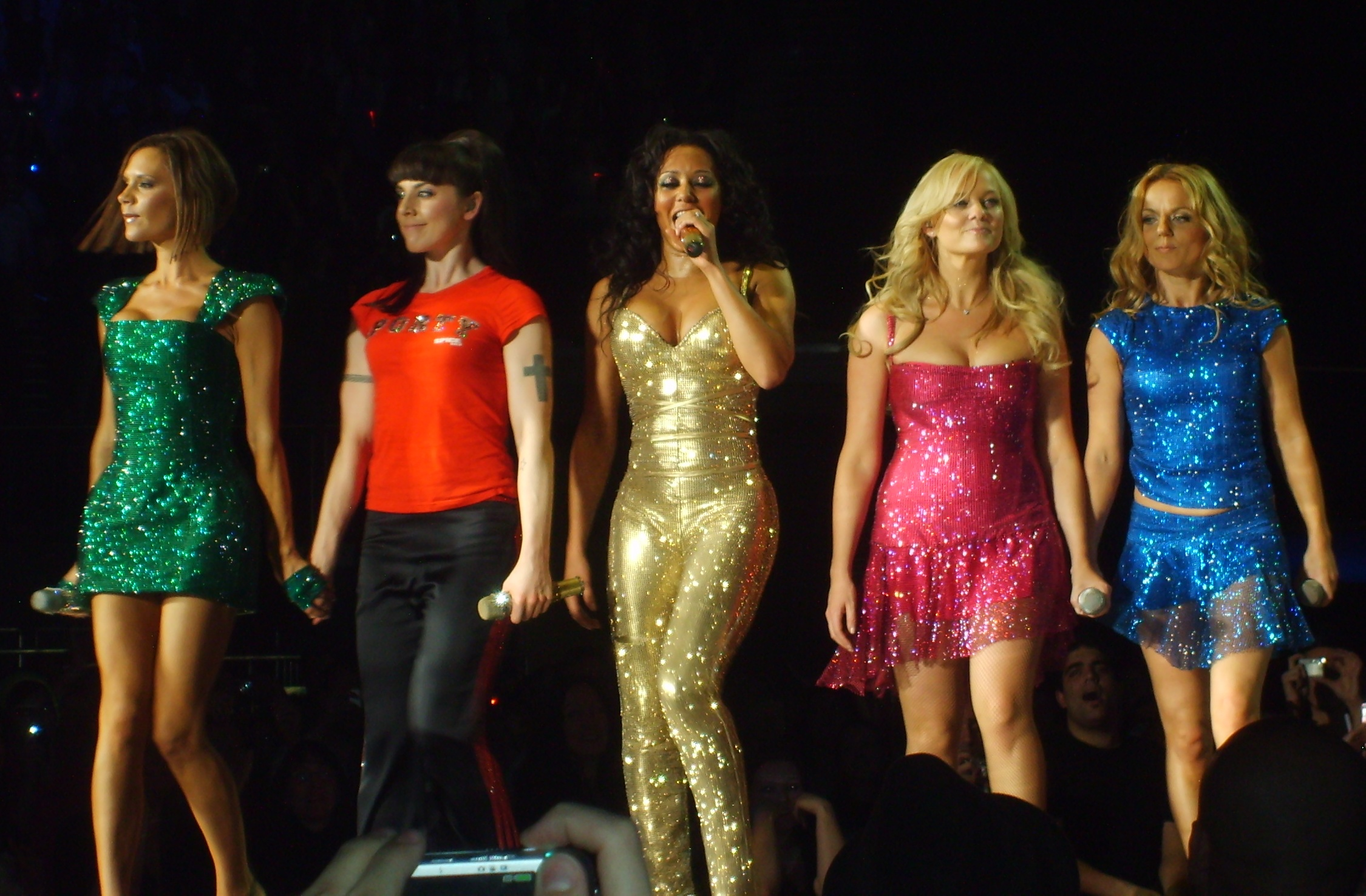
- The Spice Girls at The Return of the Spice Girls Tour (2008)
- Concert tours: 5

The British girl group the Spice Girls, consisting of Melanie Brown, also known as Mel B ("Scary Spice"); Melanie Chisholm, or Melanie C ("Sporty Spice"); Emma Bunton ("Baby Spice"); Geri Halliwell ("Ginger Spice"), and Victoria Beckham ("Posh Spice"), has headlined five concert tours, and performed at several TV and award shows.

They first promoted their debut album, Spice (1996), in 1996 and 1997, through performances at several award ceremonies and television shows, including the Brit Awards 1997 and Top of the Pops; and their two-night concert Girl Power! Live in Istanbul. They the girls promoted their second studio album, Spiceworld (1997), throughout 1997 and 1998, performing many times on television, in both Europe and the US, in shows such as An Audience with..., Top of the Pops, All That, The Jay Leno Show, Late Show with David Letterman, and The Oprah Winfrey Show.

On 24 February 1998 they embarked on their first world tour Spiceworld Tour, and in May 1998, Halliwell left the Spice Girls, citing exhaustion and creative differences. The group carried on as a four-piece with the tour, which was attended by an estimated 2.1 million people to become the highest-grossing concert tour by a female group.

In April 1999 after a period of hiatus, during which the members of the group launched their solo careers and focused on their personal lives, they announced a UK Christmas tour for that year, Christmas in Spiceworld Tour, which was held between 4–15 December.

Forever (2000), the only Spice Girls album without Halliwell, achieved weaker sales. At the end of 2000, the Spice Girls entered a hiatus to concentrate on their solo careers. They reunited for two concert tours, The Return of the Spice Girls Tour (2007–2008), and Spice World – 2019 Tour, both of which won the Billboard Live Music Award for highest-grossing engagements, making them the top touring all-female group from 2000 to 2020, grossing nearly $150 million in ticket sales across 58 shows.

== Concert tours ==
List of concert tours, with year, title, duration, number of shows, and descriptions
Year	Title	Duration	Shows
1998	Spiceworld Tour	24 February 1998 – 20 September 1998 (Europe and North America)	97
The Spiceworld Tour, the Spice Girls debut concert tour, promoted their first two studio albums, Spice (1996) and Spiceworld (1997). The group performed to an estimated 2.1 million fans, and Spiceworld Tour remains the highest-grossing tour ever by a female group. Before the North American leg, Geri Halliwell left the group. The tour received mixed to positive reviews, with critics praising their energy and dedication.
1999	Christmas in Spiceworld Tour	4 December 1999 – 15 December 1999 (United Kingdom)	8
Christmas in Spiceworld Tour was an eight-day UK-only tour, after a period of hiatus, during which they showcased new songs from their then future third studio album Forever (2000). The main stage was nearly in the middle of the arena, and in its centre there was a pit that contained the band. Above the pit were four small runways onto the circular centre piece of the stage which could be raised up and rotated. During the whole show the girls would move from the main stage to the circular one.
2007–2008	The Return of the Spice Girls Tour	2 December 2007 – 26 February 2008 (Europe and North America)	47
The Return of the Spice Girls Tour promoted the band's first greatest hits album, Greatest Hits (2007), and it was their first with all five members since the Spiceworld Tour in 1998. It was supposed to be a world tour, but dates in Asia, Oceania, Africa, and South America were cancelled. It grossed $70.1 million, and earned an additional $100 million from merchandising, making it the eighth highest-grossing concert tour of 2008. The 17-night sellout stand at London's O_{2} Arena was the highest-grossing engagement of the year, taking in $33.8 million and drawing an audience of 256,647, winning the 2008 Billboard Touring Award for Top Boxscore.
2019	Spice World – 2019 Tour	24 May 2019 – 15 June 2019 (United Kingdom & Ireland)	13
Spice World – 2019 Tour was the group's first tour as a four-piece without Victoria Beckham, who declined to take part due to other commitments. It included performances in the United Kingdom and Ireland, and despite sound problems in the early concerts, critics praised its nostalgia. Across the 13 sold-out dates, the tour produced 700,000 spectators and earned $78.2 million in ticket sales. The three-night sellout stand at Wembley Stadium was the highest-grossing engagement of the year, winning the 2019 Billboard Live Music Award for Top Boxscore, making them the top touring all-female group from 2000 to 2020.

== Promotional concert ==
List of promotional concerts, with year, title, duration, number of shows, and descriptions
Year	Title	Duration	Shows
1997	Girl Power! Live in Istanbul	12 October 1997 – 13 October 1997 (Istanbul, Turkey)	2
Girl Power! Live in Istanbul was the first major live concert by the Spice Girls, in support of their two first studio albums Spice (1996) and Spiceworld (1997). It was a two-date concert, sponsored by Pepsi, at the Abdi İpekçi Arena, in Istanbul, Turkey, on 12 and 13 October 1997, to 40,000 fans. On Christmas Day 1997, British channel ITV aired a special consisting of highlights from the concert. In the US, the concert was aired on various dates throughout 1998 on Showtime pay-per-view. Its first airing was the highest-rated music pay-per-view in seven years. It was aired again on Fox Family Channel on 16 August 1998, receiving a 1.8 household rating.

== One-off concerts ==
List of one-off concerts, with date, event, city, venue, and performed songs
Date	Event	City	Venue	Performed song(s)	Ref.
August 1996	G-A-Y Night club	London	Astoria	"Wannabe", "Say You'll Be There", "Who Do You Think You Are"	
23 October 1996	Spice promotional show	Paris	MCM Café	"2 Become 1", "Who Do You Think You Are"	
28 November 1996	Virgin Megastore opening	Lisbon, Portugal	Eden building	"Say You'll Be There", "2 Become 1", "Wannabe"	
10 December 1996	Spice promotional show	Paris	Virgin Mega Store on Champs-Élysées	"Wannabe"	
19 January 1997	Spice promotional show	Madrid, Spain	El Corte Inglés on Paseo de la Castellana	"Wannabe" (a capella)	
25 January 1997	Spice promotional show	Montréal, Canadá	City center HMV	"Say You'll Be There"	
1 February 1997	Billboard Live show	Los Angeles, California	—N/a	—N/a	
13 February 1997	McLaren MP4/12 launch	London	Alexandra Palace	"Wannabe", "Say You'll Be There", "Who Do You Think You Are"	
17 April 1997	Spice promotional show	Taipei, Taiwan	—N/a	"Mama", "Who Do You Think You Are", "One of These Girls" (a capella)	
9 December 1997	Spiceworld promotional conference	Manaus, Brazil	Amazon Theatre balcony	"Spice Up Your Life"	
12 August 2012	2012 Summer Olympics closing ceremony	London	Olympic Stadium	"Wannabe", "Spice Up Your Life" (medley)	

== Benefit concerts ==
List of benefit concerts, with date, event, city, venue, and performed songs
Date	Event	City	Venue	Performed song(s)	Ref.
14 March 1997	Comic Relief 1997	London	BBC Television Centre	"Mama"	
14 March 1997	Comic Relief 1997	London	Shepherd's Bush Empire	"Who Do You Think You Are" (featuring the Sugar Lumps)	
9 May 1997 (Note: Aired on 26 May 1997.)	A Royal Gala	Manchester, England	Manchester Opera House	"Say You'll Be There", "Mama"	
1 November 1997	Two Nations Concert	Johannesburg, South Africa	Athletics Stadium	"Spice Up Your Life", "Say You'll Be There", "Wannabe"	
30 November 1997 (Note: Aired on 6 December 1997.)	Royal Variety Performance 1997	London	Victoria Palace Theatre	"Too Much", "Who Do You Think You Are"	
9 June 1998	Pavarotti & Friends 98	Modena, Italy	Parco Novi Sad	"Stop", "Viva Forever (Io Ci Saro)" (with Luciano Pavarotti)	
20 November 1998	Children in Need 1998	London	BBC Television Centre	"Goodbye"	
6 December 1998 (Note: Aired on 20 December 1998.)	Royal Variety Performance 1998	London	Lyceum Theatre	"Goodbye"	
16 November 2007	Children in Need 2007	London	BBC Television Centre	"Headlines (Friendship Never Ends)", "Stop"	

== Festival concerts ==
List of festival concerts, with date, event, city, venue, and performed songs
Date	Event	City	Venue	Performed song(s)	Ref.
12 August 1995	Cardiff Big Weekend (Note: The Spice Girls played as part of the Galaxy 101 Showcase.)	Cardiff, Wales	Cardiff City Hall	—N/a	
28 July 1996	Capital FM Summer Jam	London, England	Clapham Common	"Wannabe"	
2 August 1996	Radio 1 Roadshow	Southend, England	Priory Park	"Wannabe"	
4 August 1996	Hallam FM Party in the Park	Sheffield, England	Don Valley Bowl	"Wannabe", "Say You'll Be There"	
10 August 1996	Cardiff Big Weekend	Cardiff, Wales	Cardiff City Hall	—N/a	
10 August 1996	Muziekdoos Festival	Middelkerke, Belgium	Casino Middelkerke	"Wannabe"	
17 August 1996	Metro FM Summer Party	Newcastle, England	Newcastle Arena	—N/a	
26 August 1996	BRMB Party in the Park	Birmingham, England	Cofton Park	—N/a	
7 February 1997	Bravo Super Show 1997	Dortmund, Germany	Westfalenhallen	"Wannabe", "2 Become 1", "Love Thing", "Say You'll Be There", "Who Do You Think You Are"	
20 February 1997	Sanremo Music Festival 1997	Sanremo, Italy	Ariston Theatre	"Wannabe" (a capella), "Say You'll Be There"	
18 May 1997	Festival Acapulco 97	Acapulco, Mexico	Salon Teotihuacan	"Say You'll Be There", "Wannabe"	

== Performances at award shows ==
List of performances at award shows, with date, event, city, venue, and performed songs
Date	Event	City	Venue	Performed song(s)	Ref.
22 October 1996	British Fashion Awards	London	Royal Albert Hall	"Say You'll Be There"	
25 November 1996	Goldene Europa	Innsbruck, Austria	—N/a	"Wannabe", "Say You'll Be There"	
30 November 1996	Premios ¡Qué Me Dices!	Madrid, Spain	—N/a	"Wannabe"	
1 December 1996	Smash Hits Poll Winners Party 1996	London	London Arena	"Wannabe", "Say You'll Be There"	
21 February 1997	IRMA Music Awards 1997	Dublin, Ireland	—N/a	"Wannabe", "Who Do You Think You Are"	
24 February 1997	Brit Awards 1997	London	Earls Court	"Wannabe" / "Who Do You Think You Are"	
15 August 1997	VIVA Comet Awards	Cologne, Germany	—N/a	"Who Do You Think You Are"	
4 September 1997	1997 MTV Video Music Awards	New York	Radio City Music Hall	"Say You'll Be There"	
18 October 1997	1997 Channel V Music Awards	New Delhi, India	Indira Gandhi Arena	"Spice Up Your Life", "Wannabe"	
6 November 1997	1997 MTV Europe Music Awards	Rotterdam, Netherlands	Ahoy	"Spice Up Your Life"	
13 November 1997 (Note: Aired on 14 November 1997.)	1997 Premios Ondas	Barcelona, Spain	Barcelona's National Palace	"Spice Up Your Life"	
19 November 1997 (Note: Aired on 20 November 1997.)	1997 Premios Amigo	Madrid, Spain	Palacio de Congresos	"Spice Up Your Life"	
30 November 1997	Smash Hits Poll Winners Party 1997	London	London Arena	"Spice Up Your Life", "Too Much"	
8 December 1997	1997 Billboard Music Awards	Las Vegas, Nevada	MGM Grand Garden Arena	"Spice Up Your Life"	
26 January 1998 (Note: Pretaped in Dublin, Ireland, on 21 January 1998.)	1998 American Music Awards	Los Angeles, California	Shrine Auditorium	"Too Much"	
9 February 1998	Brit Awards 1998	London	London Arena	"Stop"	
3 March 2000	Brit Awards 2000	London	Earls Court	"Spice Up Your Life", "Say You'll Be There" (a capella), "Holler", (Note: The performance of "Holler" was excluded from the TV broadcast due to technical problems arising during the performance.) "Goodbye"	
16 November 2000	2000 MTV Europe Music Awards	Stockholm, Sweden	Stockholm Globe Arena	"Holler"	

== Television shows and specials ==
List of performances on television shows and specials, with date, event, city, and performed songs
Date	Event	City	Performed song(s)	Ref.
17 April 1996	Hanging Out	London	"Do You Think About Me", "One of These Girls", "Wannabe" (Medley a capella)	
18 April 1996 (Note: Aired on 12 May 1996.)	Surprise Surprise	London	"Wannabe"	
18 May 1996	Hotel Babylon	London	"Wannabe"	
12 June 1996	Hanging Out	London	"Wannabe", "Say You'll Be There"	
28 June 1996	GMTV (Note: Live at the London Riverside.)	London	"Wannabe"	
2 July 1996	London Tonight	London	"Wannabe"	
2 July 1996 (Note: Aired on 7 July 1996.)	Fully Booked	Glasgow, Scotland	"Wannabe"	
19 July 1996	Top of the Pops	London (Note: By satellite at the Naritasan Shinsho-ji Temple, in Tokyo, Japan.)	"Wannabe"	
21 July 1996 (Note: Aired on 26 July 1996)	Top of the Pops	London (Note: Recorded in Tokyo, Japan.)	"Wannabe"	
31 July 1996 (Note: Aired on 2 August 1996.)	Top of the Pops	London	"Wannabe"	
14 August 1996 (Note: Aired on 16 August 1996.)	Top of the Pops	London	"Wannabe"	
15 August 1996	MTV presents From Köln with Love (Note: Live from the Popkomm Festival, at the Tanzbrunnen theatre.)	Cologne, Germany	"Wannabe", "Say You'll Be There"	
17 August 1996	VIVA Interaktiv	Cologne, Germany	"Wannabe" (a capella)	
21 August 1996 (Note: Aired on 23 August 1996.)	Top of the Pops	London	"Wannabe"	
23 August 1996	Salut les Copains	Paris	"Wannabe"	
12 September 1996	Studio Gabriel	Paris	"Wannabe"	
12 September 1996	Les Années Tubes	Paris	"Wannabe"	
14 September 1996	Gottschalk Haus Party	Unterföhring, Germany	"Wannabe"	
27 September 1996	Hit Machine	Paris	"Wannabe"	
10 October 1996	This Morning	London	"Say You'll Be There"	
10 October 1996 (Note: Aired on 11 October 1996.)	Top of the Pops	London	"Say You'll Be There"	
12 October 1996	Live & Kicking	London	"Say You'll Be There"	
14 October 1996	GMTV	London	"Say You'll Be There"	
18 October 1996	The Totally Friday Show	London	"Say You'll Be There"	
19 October 1996	The Noise	London	"Say You'll Be There"	
24 October 1996 (Note: Aired on 25 October 1996.)	Top of the Pops	London	"Say You'll Be There"	
25 October 1996 (Note: Aired on 27 October 1996.)	Le Monde Est à Vous	Paris	"Say You'll Be There"	
26 October 1996	WOW!	Maidstone, England	"Say You'll Be There"	
28 October 1996	Roxy Bar	Bologna, Italy	"Wannabe", "Say You'll Be There"	
29 October 1996 (Note: Aired on 2 November 1996.)	Tengby	Stockholm, Sweden	"Wannabe"	
1 November 1996	Buona Domenica	Rome, Italy	"Say You'll Be There"	
1 November 1996	Wiese	Oslo, Norway	"Wannabe", "Say You'll Be There"	
9 November 1996	Midt i smørøyet	Oslo, Norway	"Say You'll Be There"	
30 November 1996	Sorpresa ¡Sorpresa!	Madrid, Spain	"Wannabe"	
7 December 1996	The National Lottery Live	London	"2 Become 1"	
11 December 1996 (Note: Aired on 21 December 1996.)	Une Journée avec les Spice Girls	Paris	"One of These Girls" (a capella), (Note: Aboard Eurostar heading to London.) "2 Become 1" (Note: At a studio in London)	
11 December 1996	Des O'Connor Tonight	London	"2 Become 1"	
14 December 1996	Noel's House Party	London	"2 Become 1"	
19 December 1996	GMTV	London	"2 Become 1"	
21 December 1996	Live & Kicking	London	"2 Become 1"	
21 December 1996	The Noise	London	"2 Become 1"	
21 December 1996	Hit Machine	Paris	"Say You'll Be There"	
25 December 1996	Top of the Pops	London	"Wannabe", "Say You'll Be There, "2 Become 1"	
31 December 1996	The End of the Year Show	London	"Wannabe"	
24 January 1997	Bouge de là	Montréal, Canadá	"Wannabe’", "Mama"	
25 January 1997	Antena 3 special: Spice Girls	San Sebastián de los Reyes, Spain	"Love Thing", "2 Become 1", "Say You'll Be There", "Who Do You Think You Are", "Mama", "Wannabe"	
27 February 1997 (Note: Aired on 28 February 1997.)	Top of the Pops	London	"Mama"	
1 March 1997	Noel's House Party	London	"Who Do You Think You Are", "Wannabe"	
7 March 1997	The Girlie Show	London	"Who Do You Think You Are"	
8 March 1997	Live & Kicking	London	"Mama"	
12 March 1997 (Note: Aired on 14 March 1997.)	Top of the Pops	London	"Who Do You Think You Are"	
18 March 1997 (Note: Aired on 23 April 1997.)	The Grind	Panama City Beach, United States	"Wannabe", "Say You'll Be There"	
21 March 1997	Top of the Pops	London	"Mama"	
22 March 1997	Wetten, dass..?	Vienna, Austria	"Mama", "Wannabe" (a capella)	
28 March 1997 (Note: Repeat performance broadcast on 14 March 1997.)	Top of the Pops	London	"Who Do You Think You Are"	
30 March 1997	The Jack Docherty Show	London	"Who Do You Think You Are"	
11 April 1997 (Note: Repeat performance broadcast on 25 December 1996.)	Top of the Pops	London	"2 Become 1"	
12 April 1997	Saturday Night Live	New York	"Wannabe", "Say You'll Be There"	
21 April 1997	Sunday Sunday Night	Seoul, South Korea	"Wannabe"	
10 May 1997	Nulle part Ailleurs	Cannes, France	"Say You’ll Be There", "Wannabe"	
14 May 1997	Late Show with David Letterman	New York	"Say You’ll Be There"	
16 May 1997	Live with Regis and Kathie Lee	New York	"Wannabe"	
18 May 1997	Fantástico	Rio de Janeiro, Brazil (Note: Recorded in Acapulco, Mexico.)	"Say You'll Be There" (a capella)	
30 June 1997	The Rosie O'Donnell Show	New York	"Say You'll Be There"	
14 September 1997 (Note: Aired on 27 September 1997.)	An Audience with the Elton John	London	"Don't Go Breaking My Heart" (with Elton John)	
27 September 1997	The National Lottery Live	London	"Spice Up Your Life"	
6 October 1997	Talking Telephone Numbers	London	"Spice Up Your Life"	
24 October 1997	Top of the Pops	London (Note: Performed at the 1997 Channel V Music Awards, in New Delhi, India, on 18 October 1997.)	"Spice Up Your Life"	
31 October 1997	Top of the Pops	London	"Spice Up Your Life"	
9 November 1997 (Note: Aired on 29 December 1997.)	An Audience with the Spice Girls	London	"Wannabe", "Stop", "Mama", "Who Do You Think You Are", "Ain't No Stoppin' Us Now" (with Luther Vandross), "Say You'll Be There", "Too Much", "Spice Up Your Life"	
13 November 1997 (Note: Recording date.)	Antena 3 Christmas special: Spice Girls	San Sebastián de los Reyes, Spain	"Spice Up Your Life", "Who Do You Think You Are", "Too Much", "Stop", "Wannabe"	
15 November 1997	Fantastico	Rome, Italy	"Say You'll Be There" (a capella), "Too Much", "Spice Up Your Life"	
16 November 1997	Domenica In	Rome, Italy	"Spice Up Your Life", "Too Much"	
21 November 1997	Tien om te Zien	Vilvoorde, Belgium	"Too Much", "Spice Up Your Life"	
23 November 1997	Dimanche Martin	Paris	"Spice Up Your Life", "Too Much"	
27 November 1997	Laat de Leeuw	Hilversum, Netherlands	"Spice Up Your Life", "Too Much"	
30 November 1997 (Note: Aired on 25 December 1997.)	Spice Girls on Top ...of The Pops!	London	"2 Become 1", "Spice Up Your Life", "Too Much", "Say You'll Be There" (a capella)	
5 December 1997	The Tonight Show with Jay Leno	Burbank, California	"Spice Up Your Life"	
8 December 1997 (Note: Aired on 16 December 1997.)	The O-Zone	London (Note: Recorded in Las Vegas, Nevada.)	"Too Much" (a capella)	
13 December 1997	Wetten, dass..?	Mannheim, Germany	"Too Much"	
14 December 1997	Music Fair	Minato, Japan	"Spice Up Your Life"	
20 December 1997	Live & Kicking	London	"Too Much"	
20 December 1997	The National Lottery Live	London	"Too Much"	
26 December 1997	Hit Machine	Paris	"Too Much"	
31 December 1997	Dick Clark's New Year's Rockin' Eve '98	New York (Note: The Spice Girls performed live from the New York-New York Hotel and Casino, in Las Vegas, Nevada, United States.)	"Spice Up Your Life", "Wannabe", "Too Much"	
13 January 1998 (Note: Aired on 14 January 1998.)	The Oprah Winfrey Show	Chicago	"Wannabe", "Spice Up Your Life"	
15 January 1998	Late Show with David Letterman	New York	"Spice Up Your Life"	
6 March 1998	Top of the Pops	London (Note: Recorded on the Spiceworld Tour stage in Europe.)	"Stop"	
20 March 1998 (Note: Repeat performance broadcast on 6 March 1998.)	Top of the Pops	London	"Stop"	
18 April 1998	Live & Kicking	London (Note: Performed on the Spiceworld Tour stage, at the Wembley Arena, in London.)	"Viva Forever"	
1 May 1998	TFI Friday	London	"Step to Me", "Where Did Our Love Go?" (Emma Bunton a capella), "Sisters Are Doin' It for Themselves" (Mel B and Melanie C), "The Greatest Love of All" (Mel B a capella), "(How Does It Feel to Be) On Top of the World" (England United)	
21 May 1998	This Morning	London	"Viva Forever"	
27 May 1998	The National Lottery Draw	London	"Something Kinda Funny" (a capella), "Viva Forever", "Spice Up Your Life"	
5 June 1998	Top of the Pops	London	"Viva Forever"	
5 June 1998	Hit Machine	Paris	"wannabe", "Spice Up Your Life", "Stop", "Viva Forever"	
2 July 1998	Late Show with David Letterman	New York	"Stop"	
13 July 1998	Intimate & Interactive	Toronto, Canadá	"Wannabe", "Say You'll Be There", "Spice Up Your Life", "Stop", "Viva Forever"	
27 July 1998 (Note: Aired on 31 July 1998.)	Top of the Pops	London (Note: Recorded on the Spiceworld Tour stage, at the New World Music Theatre, in Tinley Park, Illinois, United States.)	"Viva Forever"	
7 August 1998 (Note: Repeat performance broadcast on 31 July 1998.)	Top of the Pops	London	"Viva Forever"	
17 August 1998	The Tonight Show with Jay Leno	Burbank, California	"Stop"	
28 August 1998 (Note: Repeat performance broadcast on 31 July 1998.)	Top of the Pops	London (Note: Recorded on the Spiceworld Tour stage, at the New World Music Theatre, in Tinley Park, Illinois, United States.)	"Viva Forever"	
12 December 1998	The National Lottery Draw	London	"Goodbye"	
18 December 1998	Top of the Pops	London	"Goodbye"	
18 December 1998 (Note: Aired on 25 December 1998.)	Top of the Pops	London	"Viva Forever", "Goodbye"	
19 December 1998	Live & Kicking	London	"Goodbye"	
19 December 1998	CD:UK	London	"Goodbye"	
26 December 1998	CD:UK	London	"Goodbye"	
9 January 1999 (Note: Repeat performance broadcast on 25 December 1998.)	Top of the Pops	London	"Goodbye"	
12 October 2000 (Note: Aired on 13 October 2000.)	Top of the Pops	London	"Holler"	
7 October 2000	The National Lottery Stars	London	"Let Love Lead the Way"	
14 October 2000	CD:UK	London	"Let Love Lead the Way"	
28 October 2000	CD:UK	London	"Holler"	
3 November 2000	Top of the Pops	London	"Let Love Lead The Way"	
10 November 2000	TFI Friday	London	"Say You'll Be There" (Melanie C solo)	
16 November 2007 (Note: Aired on 4 December 2007.)	Victoria's Secret Fashion Show 2007	Los Angeles	"Stop", "Headlines (Friendship Never Ends)" (Note: The performance of "Headlines (Friendship Never Ends)" was excluded from the TV broadcast for unknown reasons.)	
22 December 2007	Strictly Come Dancing	London	"2 Become 1"	
27 July 2012	London Olympics 2012	London	"Wannabe", "Spice Up Your Life"	
