= Move Over =

1997 song by the Spice Girls

Song by Spice Girls

from the album Spiceworld
- Released: 3 November 1997
- Recorded: 1997
- Studio: Abbey Road
- Genre: Dance-pop
- Length: 2:46 (album version); 5:30 (live version)
- Label: Virgin
- Songwriters: Clifford Lane; Mary Wood; Spice Girls
- Producers: Matt Rowe; Richard Stannard

Audio video
- "Move Over" on YouTube

"Move Over", also known as "Generationext", is a song by English girl group the Spice Girls from their second studio album, Spiceworld (1997). The song was originally co-written by Clifford Lane with Mary Wood as a jingle for PepsiCo's "GeneratioNext" advertising campaign and used in television ads released in January 1997. Through Abbott Mead Vickers BBDO, the Spice Girls signed an endorsement deal with Pepsi in early 1997, that consisted of the release of an exclusive CD single, TV commercials, on-can and bottle promotion and the group's first live concerts in Turkey.

The Spice Girls co-wrote with Lane and Wood a new extended version of "Move Over", which was produced by Matt Rowe and Richard Stannard. The version is a dance-pop song with influences of pop-rock, which is thematically linked to the concepts of merchandising and consumerism. The Spice Girls filmed three television ads using their own version of the song and later included it as a track on Spiceworld, while a one-track CD featuring a live performance of the song during the Istanbul concerts was released as a promotional single by Pepsi.

The inclusion of "Move Over" as a track on Spiceworld garnered divisive opinions from music critics, while the song itself received a mixed reception for its production and lyrical content. The group performed the song for their first live concert, later released on video as Girl Power! Live in Istanbul (1998). It was also added to the setlist of their 1998 Spiceworld Tour.

== Background ==
In May 1995, the Spice Girls met with artist manager Simon Fuller, who signed them with 19 Entertainment. The group considered a variety of record labels in London and Los Angeles, signing a deal with Virgin Records in July. From this point on until the summer of 1996, the Spice Girls continued to write and record tracks for their debut album, set to be released at the end of 1996. On 8 July 1996, the Spice Girls released their debut single "Wannabe" in the United Kingdom, with it topping the UK Singles Chart for seven weeks. Following an international promotional campaign, the song became a commercial success across Asia, Europe and Oceania. In October, their second single "Say You'll Be There" debuted at number one in the UK. On 4 November 1996, the Spice Girls released their debut studio album Spice, selling 1.5 million copies in the UK by the end of the year. The album's third single, "2 Become 1", topped the UK Singles Chart in December.

From the beginning of the Spice Girls, Fuller envisioned the group as their own particular brand, and soon after, they became involved in an unprecedented marketing phenomenon that led to a prolific number of merchandise and sponsorship deals, a situation that at the time "proved ground-breaking" in pop music. The sponsorship agency Broadcast Innovations conceived the idea to link the Spice Girls with PepsiCo's then upcoming advertising campaign. The agency subsequently approached Abbott Mead Vickers BBDO (AMV BBDO) in London with the marketing strategy for the endorsement deal, which was then presented to Pepsi. Negotiations with Fuller started in October 1996, for a deal that initially only covered the UK and the rest of Europe. In early 1997, the Spice Girls signed a multimillion-pound deal with the company to front its latest ad campaign, which had been expanded to 78 countries worldwide. Robert Dodds, president of 19 Entertainment, commented about the collaboration: "They [Pepsi] were smart in believing in the girls [...] They got in early, [...] by the time they actually wanted to run the activity, the girls were the biggest thing on the planet. It genuinely built their business globally."

== Writing and release ==
In January 1997, Pepsi announced its new global marketing campaign under the "GeneratioNext" slogan, a continuation of the "Pepsi Generation" advertisement theme. The new slogan aimed to replace the various catch phrases used in the United States such as "Nothing else is a Pepsi", and those used in international markets such as "Change the script" and "Choice of a new generation". Pepsi bought around four minutes of commercial time during the Super Bowl XXXI, which happened on 26 January 1997. The commercial was fast-paced and featured young boxers, waitresses and fun-seekers. Brian Swette, executive vice president and chief marketing officer at Pepsi, described the characters in it as "positive, in control and lay claim to the future—the antithesis of Generation X". The Spice Girls' arrival in the U.S. was seen as heralding the teen culture of first-wave Millennials and a new wave in teen pop.

The ads featured the jingle "Move Over", written by Mary Wood and Clifford Lane of the BBDO advertising agency in New York City. In an interview with Billboard, Wood commented that during the process of creating "Move Over", it was more important to have a "great song first" before any product placement; she commented: "We started writing all these hooks—'next phase, next wave, next craze'—to define what this idea of 'Generation Next' meant, and then we kind of went, 'Oh, no, the product. We got to go back and get the product.'" The lyrics of the song mock past musical styles such as "rave, rap, punk, metal" urging listeners to not "do it over, cause that's over", while embracing the "next page, next stage, next craze, next wave".

The Spice Girls recorded their own version of the jingle for the commercials they did for Pepsi, at Abbey Road Studios in London. The complete un-edited two-minutes 46-seconds version of the song, was officially unveiled on 6 October 1997, during a press conference in Granada, Spain, as the sixth track of the group's second studio album Spiceworld, set to be released on 3 November 1997. The album credits Wood, Lane and the Spice Girls as writers and the songwriting team Richard "Biff" Stannard and Matt Rowe as the producers of the song. "Move Over" was later included as the sixth track on the group's 2007 Greatest Hits compilation album.

== Composition and lyrics ==
"Move Over"
A 17-second sample of the song, featuring the group singing part of the chorus, that follows similar lyrics to the original Pepsi jingle.

Musically, "Move Over" is an uptempo dance-pop song, with influences from rock music. David Sinclair of The Times characterized the song as a "Joan Jett-ish pop-rock anthem", while the Chicago Tribune's Greg Kot described it as "bubblegum industrial rock". The song is written in the key of G minor, with a time signature set in common time, and moves at a moderate tempo of 104 beats per minute. It starts with a drums introduction that is followed by the repeated use of the phrase "Generation Next" while using the sequence of Gm–F–C–F as the chord progression. The song features an energetic "burbling beat", and well as a "rousing" chorus that combines the Spice Girls' voices with a "metallic power chord".

The song's lyrics has been described as "slogan-mongering", while thematically some critics linked it to merchandising and consumerism. Geri Halliwell commented about the meaning of the song: "It's about the next generation breaking free". The "English accented, hip-hopped", rap during the song's bridge was described by J. D. Considine of The Baltimore Sun as "mildly funky". It uses word association rhymes with the word "Generation" ("Dedication /Celebration /Phenomination /Good Vibration").

== Sponsorship deal ==
=== Promotional campaign ===
The sponsorship deal signed between Pepsi and the Spice Girls consisted of the release of 30-second television ads, on-can and bottle promotion featuring pictures of the group and their first live concerts, reportedly worth £1 million. The campaign ran worldwide and helped expand the Spice Girls brand globally, in particular in Southeast Asia and both North and South America. Ray Cooper, deputy managing director at Virgin commented about the deal: "It's millions and millions of pounds worth of film and television advertising that we couldn't even contemplate. But Pepsi can build that into their game plan." As part of the deal, British advertising agency Claydon Heeley International devised the release of "Step to Me" during the summer of 1997, an exclusive CD single only available to customers who had collected 20 pink ring pull tabs from promotional Pepsi cans, not accessible through traditional retailers. This resulted in the company redeeming 12,000 applications a day. An accompanying extensive campaign also ran in the British national and regional press, teen magazines and radio ads on Capital FM's the Pepsi Chart Show.

The Spice Girls filmed three television ads using their version of "Move Over" as part of the campaign. AMV BBDO began shooting the ads in March 1997, with American director Sam Bayer. Located in a deserted alley in downtown Los Angeles, the shoot required armed guards for the crew because of the menacing setting. The ads featured the group throwing cans in the air, as well as singing and dancing to the song while gyrating around buildings with a silver backdrop containing the Pepsi logo. They premiered the first week of June 1997 in the US, before later expanding to TVs and cinemas in 60 countries. On 12–13 October 1997, the Spice Girls performed two live concerts in Istanbul, Turkey, a location chosen because it was one of the most important marketing drive areas for Pepsi. The company distributed 40,000 tickets that were for the most part only available to the winners of one of the largest ever staged competitions in Europe.

=== Aftermath ===
In late July 1997, 92 million promotional packs of Pepsi cans and bottles featuring the Spice Girls were produced worldwide. Britvic, Pepsi's UK franchise holder, estimated that between 450,000 and 600,000 CDs of "Step to Me" were redeemed during the campaign, becoming the most successful on-pack promotion in the history of the British soft-drink market. In the UK, sales of Pepsi increased by 30% during the week of promotion for the Istanbul concerts. Simon Lowden, marketing director for Pepsi Europe commented that by October 1997, the company achieved a 23.5% volume share up from their usual 18.7% in the country, while in the rest of Europe its share of the cola market reached 20%, increasing by up to 1.6% since the beginning of the promotional campaign with the Spice Girls.

In November 1997, Pepsi signed a new deal with the group for a European promotional campaign during the first months of 1998. Similar to the previous deal, it offered consumers the chance to collect exclusive live CDs by the Spice Girls and three other acts, Coolio, Hanson and Eternal, by gathering 18 ring pull tabs from Pepsi cans. The company backed the campaign with TV, press and poster ads during May and June 1998. The group released a one-track promotional single CD featuring a live performance of the song taken from their Istanbul concerts as "Move Over/Generationext (Live)".

== Critical reception ==
Music critics had divisive positions about the inclusion of "Move Over" on Spiceworld. Melody Maker's Ian Watson called the song an "extended advert" and considered it one of the tracks that "ruin what could have been a sublime record". Writing for Slate magazine, David Plotz remarked that the song "is what businesspeople call synergy and musicians call prostitution. Whatever it is, it pays." The Hartford Courant's music critic Roger Catlin was critical of the addition, commenting that the Spice Girls appear to be "blissfully blind to the commercial overkill of turning their Pepsi commercial into a track of its own". Considine of The Baltimore Sun had a similar impression, wondering if "any of them stoop to adding a jingle to their repertoire". Jim Sullivan of The Boston Globe was unconcerned with the addition as he thought that "there's no credibility to lose. The walls between overt commercialism and pop music are pretty thin anyway." Ruth Kinane of Entertainment Weekly believed that "Move Over" helped in "paving the way for even more acceptable pop/product marketing collaborations for generations to come". The Guardian's Alexis Petridis felt that it is "a bit hard to hear as a song rather than an advertising jingle". David Wild of Rolling Stone magazine's had a more positive opinion, calling the track "a nifty cross-promotion of a song", while Deborah J. Wolfinsohn of the Austin American-Statesman characterized the collaboration as "a bizarre and thoroughly modern sensation".

The song itself was met with mixed opinions from critics. Sarah Davis of Dotmusic regarded "Move Over" as one of "the most eagerly anticipated tracks on the album, if one of the more repetitive". The Los Angeles Times critic Natalie Nichols considered it the album's "most engaging number", an opinion shared by Newsday's Scott Schinder, who highlighted the song as one of the album's "more appealing tracks". In a review of the group's entire catalogue, Vulture.com's Anne T. Donahue placed the track as their sixth best song, describing it as "an anthem so powerful it inspired countless listeners [...] to abandon Coke for Pepsi". Ilana Kaplan of Billboard magazine thought the song was "the perfect anthem for the Gen Y". Caroline Sullivan of The Guardian commented that of all the songs on Spiceworld "only 'Stop' and 'Move Over' live up to their vulgar potential". David Browne of Entertainment Weekly was mixed on the track; although he described it as "a laughably vague call for universal togetherness", Browne added that "suddenly the hearttakes over, and you find yourself lying in front of the stereo speakers bowing before the great goddesses of Spice". Edna Gundersen, writing for USA Today, had a more critical view of the song, calling it a "tiresome chant that goads 'generation next'" and pointed it out as an example of the album's "stream of cliched 'Girl Power' pep talks". While reviewing Spiceworld, Craig D. Lindsey of the Houston Press called "Move Over" one of the album's "two grating songs", while Charlie Porter of The Times dismissed it as the "awful song from their Pepsi advert".

== Live performances ==
In October 1997, the Spice Girls performed "Move Over" as part of the encore of their first live concert at the Abdi İpekçi Arena in Istanbul. For the performance, the group returned to the stage after a small break, wearing silver boilersuits while the background screens showed visuals of the Pepsi logo. The concert was broadcast on Showtime in a pay-per-view concert special titled Spice Girls in Concert: Wild!, and later included on the VHS and DVD release Girl Power! Live in Istanbul (1998). The Spice Girls added the song to the setlist for their 1998 Spiceworld Tour. During the performance, the group portrayed supermodels on a runway, dressed in over the top clothes designed by British stylist Kenny Ho. A group of male dancers dressed in black coats played the role of photographers at the side of a catwalk show. The song was included on the setlist of the Spice World – 2019 Tour as part of the first interlude.

== Format and track listing ==
- UK/European Promotional CD
1. "Move Over/Generationext" (Live) – 5:30

== Credits and personnel ==
Credits of "Move Over" adapted from the booklet of Spiceworld.

- Spice Girls – lyrics, vocals
- Clifford Lane – lyrics
- Mary Wood – lyrics
- Matt Rowe – producer, keyboards, programming
- Richard Stannard – producer
- Mark "Spike" Stent – audio mixing
- Adrian Bushby – recording engineer
- Paul "P. Dub" Walton – assistant
- Pete Davis – additional programming
- Jake Davies – additional engineering
