= Spiceworld (album) =

1997 studio album by the Spice Girls

Studio album by Spice Girls
- Released: 1 November 1997
- Recorded: 1997
- Studios: Abbey Road (London); Whitfield Street (London); Lansdowne (London); The Manor Mobile; Olympic (London)
- Genres: Pop; dance-pop
- Length: 38:37
- Label: Virgin
- Producers: Absolute; Matt Rowe; Richard Stannard

Spice Girls chronology
Spice (1996)	Spiceworld (1997)	Forever (2000)

Singles from Spiceworld
- 1. "Spice Up Your Life" Released: 13 October 1997; 2. "Too Much" Released: 15 December 1997; 3. "Stop" Released: 9 March 1998; 4. "Viva Forever" Released: 10 July 1998

Spiceworld is the second studio album by English girl group the Spice Girls, released on 1 November 1997 by Virgin Records. It incorporates dance-pop music and production. The album became a commercial success worldwide, lengthening the so-called "Spicemania" of the time. It debuted at number one on the UK Albums Chart, with first-week sales of 190,000 copies and shipped 1.4 million copies in two weeks. The album also reached number one in 13 countries, while peaking inside the top three in Australia, Canada, France, Switzerland and the United States. Spiceworld has sold over 14 million copies worldwide, making it one of the world's best-selling albums by a girl group.

The album spawned four singles, all of which saw commercial success. Its lead single, "Spice Up Your Life", became an international success, peaking in the top five positions in many countries. It was followed by the singles "Too Much", "Stop", and "Viva Forever", all of which attained commercial success on the charts. To promote the album, the Spice Girls embarked on their debut headlining concert tour, titled the Spiceworld Tour, covering Europe and North America for a total of 97 dates between February and September 1998. This is the last studio album with member Geri Halliwell, who left during the tour, but rejoined in 2007. An expanded edition of the album, titled Spiceworld25, was released on 4 November 2022 to celebrate its 25th anniversary.

== Background ==
After releasing their hugely successful debut album, Spice, which later became one of the best-selling albums of all time, the group announced they were working on a second studio album. During the recording and writing of Spiceworld the group also filmed Spice World, a musical comedy film starring the Spice Girls as themselves. The album worked as a soundtrack to the film, with most of the songs from the album appearing in the film, with the exception of "Move Over".

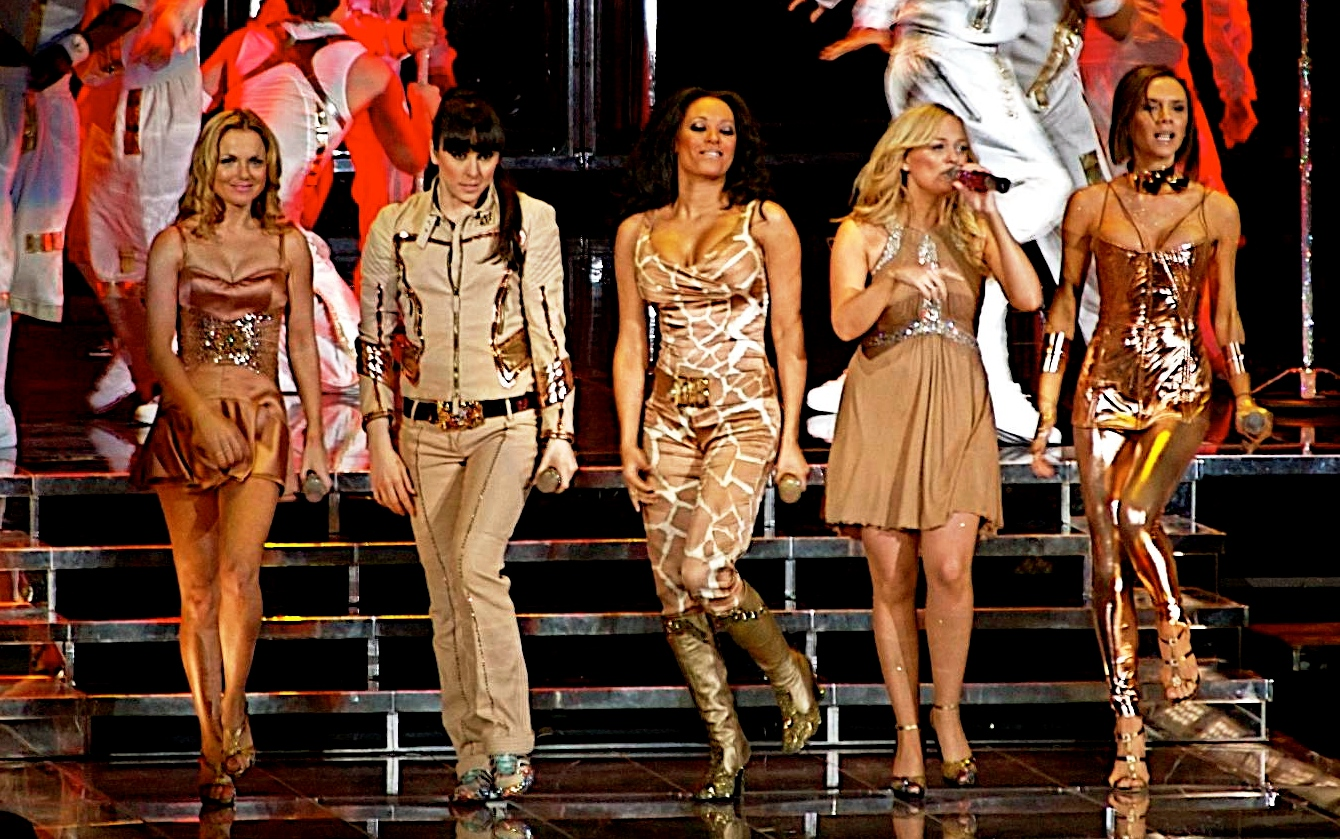
The Spice Girls performing "Stop" during The Return of the Spice Girls Tour in Toronto in February 2008

Throughout 1997, the Spice Girls received massive media attention, which also included a few controversies. The group performed live for the first time for the British royal family. At the show, they breached royal protocol when Mel B and then Geri Halliwell planted kisses on Prince Charles's cheeks and pinched his bottom. The group was also criticised in the United States for releasing their second album, Spiceworld, just nine months after the American release of their debut album, Spice. They received further criticism because of the impact and amount of sponsorship deals they had signed. They also made a decision to fire their manager Simon Fuller in November 1997, which was front-page news around the world.

In October 1997, the Spice Girls held a two-date concert in Istanbul titled Girl Power! Live in Istanbul, sponsored by Pepsi. During the concert the group premiered three new songs from Spiceworld: "Too Much", "Stop" and "Saturday Night Divas". Two promotional singles from Spiceworld were released prior to the album release in 1997: "Step to Me" and "Move Over (Generation Next)". Both songs were used in the Pepsi advertising campaigns and were also given away free with special ring pulls. The Japanese album version of "Step to Me" is slightly different from the original release of the song, while "Move Over (Generation Next)" was only released as a live version during its promotional release.

== Composition ==
"Spice Up Your Life"
A 20-second sample of the song, featuring the group singing the last part of the chorus, followed by a spoken bridge, in which they mention different dance styles, with a backing track that have influences of Latin rhythms such as salsa and samba.

"Too Much"
A 26-second sample of the song, featuring the group during the second chorus. Bunton sings the high part; Mel B, Beckham and Halliwell the lower and middle parts, while Melanie C adds the ad-libs.

The album consists of pop music with dance-pop songs and production. According to AllMusic, the album's music is "catchier" and has an "intoxicating sense of fun". The album was also used as the soundtrack to their 1997 film Spice World. "Spice Up Your Life" is an uptempo dance-pop song, with influences of Latin rhythms such as salsa and samba. The lyrics to "Spice Up Your Life" are an international rally cry, targeted to a global market, as Melanie C described it: "We always wanted to do a carnival tune and write a song for the world." "Stop" is an uptempo dance-pop song with influences of Motown's blue-eyed soul, and is reminiscent of classic singles by the Supremes or Martha and the Vandellas. Lyrically, the song calls for a slowing down on the courtship process, and it is particularly addressed to appeal to the young female audience, as the female to female bonds are not threatened. "Too Much" is a pop ballad, with influences of R&B music and doo-wop sounds, whereas "Never Give Up on the Good Times" is a dance-pop song with influences of disco. "Viva Forever" is a pop ballad with influences of Latin music. "The Lady Is a Vamp" has influences of jazz.

== Promotion ==
=== Singles ===
"Spice Up Your Life" was released as the lead single from the album on 13 October 1997. The song became an instant worldwide success, although it received negative reviews from music critics. In the United Kingdom, the song peaked at number one, becoming the group's fifth consecutive chart-topper, and was certified platinum by the BPI. "Spice Up Your Life" reached the top five in over 14 countries, while reaching number 18 on the Billboard Hot 100 in the United States.

The album's second single, "Too Much", was released on 15 December 1997 and hit number one in the UK, becoming the group's second consecutive Christmas number-one single. The song was certified platinum in the UK. In the US, "Too Much" peaked at number nine on the Billboard Hot 100, their fourth and so far last top-10 single there. The song also peaked at number nine in Australia, New Zealand, and Canada.

The third single from Spiceworld was "Stop". Critically, the song received mainly positive reviews from music critics, mostly praising the Motown-inspired music and production. It was released on 9 March 1998 and peaked at number two in the United Kingdom, ending the Spice Girls' streak of consecutive number-one singles on the UK chart at six. The single received a silver certification. In the US the song peaked at number 16 on the Hot 100. Elsewhere, "Stop" reached the top 10 in nine other countries.

The fourth and final single from the album was intended to be a double A-side release of "Never Give Up on the Good Times" and "Viva Forever". However, due to Halliwell's departure from the group, the plan was scrapped. Instead, "Viva Forever" was released alone on 10 July 1998. The song received critical acclaim from critics, as some called it "genuine". "Viva Forever" reached number one in the United Kingdom and was certified platinum by the BPI. The song debuted at number one in New Zealand, becoming the band's first chart-topper in that country since "Wannabe". "Viva Forever" did not receive a single release in the United States.

=== Live performances ===
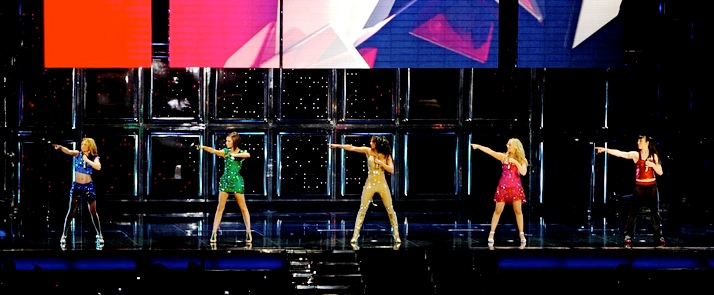
The group performing a remix version of the "Spice Up Your Life" during the show's encore, in Toronto in February 2008

The Spice Girls performed "Spice Up Your Life" for the first time in the United Kingdom on 27 September 1997, on BBC's programme National Lottery, which attracted more than nine million viewers. The song was subsequently performed many times on television, in both Europe and the US, including An Audience with..., Top of the Pops, All That, The Jay Leno Show, Late Show with David Letterman, and The Oprah Winfrey Show. "Spice Up Your Life" was also performed in many award ceremonies such as the 1997 Smash Hits! Awards, the 1997 MTV Europe Music Awards, the 1997 Billboard Music Awards, the 1997 Premios Ondas, the 1997 Channel V Music Awards, and the 2000 Brit Awards. "Too Much" was performed several times on television, including An Audience with..., Top of the Pops, and the 1997 Royal Variety Performance. The group also performed it at the 1997 Smash Hits! Awards, and at the 25th Annual American Music Awards. "Stop" was also performed many times on television, in both the UK and the US, including An Audience with..., Top of the Pops, The Tonight Show with Jay Leno, and the Late Show with David Letterman. For their "Stop" performance at the 1998 Brit Awards, the group adopted a Supremes-like look, and appeared on the stage in a 1960-style car. The group performed "Stop" and "Viva Forever" without Halliwell in Modena, Italy; for the annually hosted Pavarotti & Friends charity concert in June 1998. "Viva Forever" was performed with Halliwell on Top of the Pops on 21 May 1998 and without her on 27 May 1998 at the National Lottery. In October 1997 the Spice Girls held a two-date concert on Abdi İpekçi Arena in Istanbul, Turkey, performing four songs of Spiceworld: "Spice Up Your Life", "Too Much", "Saturday Night Divas" and "Stop". The performance was broadcast on Showtime in a pay-per-view event titled Spice Girls in Concert Wild!.

=== Tour ===
In early 1998, the Spice Girls embarked on their first world tour that Fuller had set up for them covering Europe and North America for 97 dates. The Spiceworld Tour kicked off in Dublin, Ireland, on 24 February 1998 before moving on to mainland Europe and then returning to the UK for eight gigs at Wembley Arena and six gigs at Birmingham's NEC Arena. On 31 May 1998, Halliwell left the group during the tour's run. The remaining girls continued the tour to its last date without Halliwell. A VHS release of the group's performance at Wembley Stadium, titled Live at Wembley Stadium, was released on 24 November 1998.

== Critical reception ==
Professional ratings
Review scores
Source	Rating
AllMusic	4.5/5 stars
Entertainment Weekly	B+
The Guardian	3/5 stars
Houston Press	3/5 stars
Music Week	5/5 stars
NME	3/10
Now	2/5 stars
Rolling Stone	3/5 stars
Smash Hits	5/5 stars
Sputnikmusic	2.5/5

Spiceworld received positive reviews from music critics. Stephen Thomas Erlewine from AllMusic wrote that the album "boast[s] a more consistent (and catchier) set of songs [than Spice] and an intoxicating sense of fun", concluding that "each song has a strong melody and a strong, solid beat, whether it's a ballad or a dance number. It's a pure, unadulterated guilty pleasure and some of the best manufactured mainstream dance-pop of the late '90s." David Browne from Entertainment Weekly stated, "Trading verses in this and other songs, they transform the numbers into audio pajama parties full of sisterly advice, support, and warnings. Part heart, part mind, all cotton candy, Spiceworld may just be the answer to one of life's most vexing quandaries."

Rolling Stone's David Wild commented that, compared to Spice, Spiceworld is "a masterful effort; at its best, it reaches creative heights that are downright Bananaramian." In a mixed review, Craig D. Lindsey of the Houston Press expressed, "Anyone expecting a maelstrom of artistic evolution from these women ought to relax a little; it's only music, for chrissakes. And the Spice Girls and their handlers deserve bonus points for showing a little common sense. After all, if this were seven years ago, they might have taken their precious time releasing Spiceworld, while the group's hype was irreversibly extinguished."

== Commercial performance ==
Spiceworld debuted at number one on the UK Albums Chart, selling 192,000 copies and shipping 1.4 million copies in its first week. The album was certified five-times platinum by the British Phonographic Industry (BPI) on 19 December 1997, and had sold 1,603,426 copies in the United Kingdom as of October 2019. The album reached number one in several European countries, including Austria, Denmark, Finland, Ireland, the Netherlands and Norway. It was certified five-times platinum by the International Federation of the Phonographic Industry (IFPI), denoting sales in excess of five million copies across Europe. In Japan, Spiceworld peaked at number six on the Oricon Albums Chart and earned a double platinum certification from the Recording Industry Association of Japan (RIAJ). In Oceania, the album reached number two in Australia and number one in New Zealand; it was certified six-times platinum by the Australian Recording Industry Association (ARIA) and triple platinum by the Recording Industry Association of New Zealand (RIANZ).

The album debuted at number eight on the US Billboard 200 with first-week sales of 83,000 copies. Sales increased week by week, its best week being that of 3 January 1998 when it sold 284,000 copies. The album finally peaked at number three on 14 February, when Spice also returned to the top 10, making the Spice Girls the first British group to have two albums in the top 10 of the Billboard 200 at the same time since the Rolling Stones in mid-1975. The album sold 1.74 million copies in the first 12 weeks and 3.2 million in the first 10 months. It was certified four-times platinum by the Recording Industry Association of America (RIAA) on 19 May 1999, and by December 2007, it had sold 4.2 million copies in the US. In Canada, the album peaked at number two on the Canadian Albums Chart, with first-week sales of 34,871 copies and was certified diamond by the Canadian Recording Industry Association (CRIA) for shipments of one million copies. Spiceworld was a big success in Canada, it was the group's second diamond-selling album and spent 43 weeks in the Top 10 and 60 weeks in the Top 20 album chart. Spiceworld had sold 13 million copies by the end of 1998, making it one of the world's best-selling albums by a girl group.

== Spiceworld25 ==
On 27 September 2022, the Spice Girls announced the release of the 25th-anniversary edition of Spiceworld, titled Spiceworld25. The expanded edition features previously unreleased live versions and remixes, in addition to previously available B-sides "Walk of Life" and "Outer Space Girls" and a megamix. The anniversary had first been teased in July 2022, when they released an image of the Earth with a "Spiceworld25" banner across it. Their 1997 song "Step to Me" was released digitally for the first time on the same day as the album announcement. "Step to Me" had originally been released in 1997 as part of a Pepsi promotion, where fans could obtain the CD single if they collected enough ring pulls.

Spiceworld25 was released digitally on 4 November 2022 by UMC, as well as on double LP, double cassette, picture disc and clear vinyl. On the same day, an official montage music video for "Never Give Up on the Good Times" was released, and was directed by Kiran Mistry. A two-CD and hardback book set was released on 16 December 2022.

On 11 November 2022, following the release of Spiceworld25, Spiceworld re-entered the UK Albums Chart at number 46 with 2,257 copies sold.

== Track listing ==
No.	Title	Writer(s)	Producer(s)	Length
1.	"Spice Up Your Life"	Spice Girls; Richard Stannard; Matt Rowe	Stannard; Rowe	2:53
2.	"Stop"	Spice Girls; Andy Watkins; Paul Wilson	Absolute	3:24
3.	"Too Much"	Spice Girls; Watkins; Wilson	Absolute	4:31
4.	"Saturday Night Divas"	Spice Girls; Stannard; Rowe	Stannard; Rowe	4:25
5.	"Never Give Up on the Good Times"	Spice Girls; Stannard; Rowe	Stannard; Rowe	4:30
6.	"Move Over"	Spice Girls; Mary Wood; Clifford Lane	Stannard; Rowe	2:46
7.	"Do It"	Spice Girls; Watkins; Wilson	Absolute	4:04
8.	"Denying"	Spice Girls; Watkins; Wilson	Absolute	3:46
9.	"Viva Forever"	Spice Girls; Stannard; Rowe	Stannard; Rowe	5:09
10.	"The Lady Is a Vamp"	Spice Girls; Watkins; Wilson	Absolute	3:09
Total length:				38:37

Japanese edition
No.	Title	Writer(s)	Producer(s)	Length
7.	"Step to Me"	Spice Girls; Eliot Kennedy	Absolute	4:18
8.	"Do It"	Spice Girls; Watkins; Wilson	Absolute	4:04
9.	"Denying"	Spice Girls; Watkins; Wilson	Absolute	3:46
10.	"Viva Forever"	Spice Girls; Stannard; Rowe	Stannard; Rowe	5:09
11.	"The Lady Is a Vamp"	Spice Girls; Watkins; Wilson	Absolute	3:09
Total length:				42:55

Spiceworld – 25th Anniversary (disc two)
No.	Title	Writer(s)	Producer(s)	Length
1.	"Step to Me" (7″ mix)	Spice Girls; Kennedy	Absolute	4:05
2.	"Outer Space Girls"	Spice Girls; Stannard; Rowe	Stannard; Rowe	3:58
3.	"Walk of Life"	Spice Girls; Watkins; Wilson	Absolute	4:16
4.	"Step to Me" (demo version)	Spice Girls; Kennedy	Kennedy	4:50
5.	"Too Much" (live in Toronto, July 1998)	Spice Girls; Watkins; Wilson		5:30
6.	"Stop" (live in Madrid, March 1998)	Spice Girls; Watkins; Wilson		3:25
7.	"Move Over" (live in Istanbul, October 1997)	Spice Girls; Wood; Lane		3:38
8.	"Spice Up Your Life" (live in Arnhem, March 1998)	Spice Girls; Stannard; Rowe		4:11
9.	"Viva Forever" (live in Manchester, April 1998)	Spice Girls; Stannard; Rowe		5:59
10.	"Spice Up Your Life" (Morales Radio Mix)	Spice Girls; Stannard; Rowe	Stannard; Rowe	2:48
11.	"Stop" (Morales Remix Edit)	Spice Girls; Watkins; Wilson	Absolute	5:52
12.	"Too Much" (Soulshock & Karlin Remix)	Spice Girls; Watkins; Wilson	Absolute	3:53
13.	"Viva Forever" (John Themis Ethnic Latino Ambient Mix)	Spice Girls; Stannard; Rowe	Stannard; Rowe; Themis^{[a]}	5:41
14.	"Step to Me" (extended mix)	Spice Girls; Kennedy	Absolute	5:41
15.	"Spice Girls Party Mix" ("Spice Up Your Life" (Morales Radio Mix) / "Step to Me" (Matthew's Disco Steppin' Mix) / "Stop" (Morales Remix) / "Never Give Up on the Good Times" / "Wannabe" (Junior Vasquez Remix) / "Who Do You Think You Are" (Morales Club Mix))			14:44

=== Notes ===
- ^{^[a]} signifies an additional producer

== Personnel ==
Credits adapted from the liner notes of Spiceworld.

=== Musicians ===
- Matt Rowe – keyboards, programming (tracks 1, 4–6, 9)
- Pete Davis – additional programming (tracks 1, 4–6, 9)
- Mike Higham – additional programming (tracks 2, 3, 7, 8, 10)
- Absolute – instruments (tracks 2, 3, 7, 8)
- Kick Horns – brass (tracks 2, 3)
- Milton McDonald – guitar (tracks 2, 3, 8); additional guitar (track 7)
- Stephen Hussey – string arrangement (track 3)
- Pure Stringz – strings (track 3)
- Magnus Fiennes – additional programming (tracks 4, 5, 7); additional keyboards (track 7)
- Steve Lewinson – bass guitar (track 5)
- Shawn Lee – guitar (track 5)
- Snake Davis – flute (track 5)
- Anne Dudley – string arrangement (tracks 5, 9)
- Paul "Tubbs" Williams – bass (track 8)
- John Themis – acoustic guitar (track 9)
- Steve Sidwell – orchestral arrangement (track 10)

=== Technical ===
- Richard Stannard – production (tracks 1, 4–6, 9)
- Matt Rowe – production (tracks 1, 4–6, 9)
- Adrian Bushby – recording, engineering (tracks 1, 4–6, 9)
- Mark "Spike" Stent – mixing
- Paul "P. Dub" Walton – mixing assistance (tracks 1, 2, 4–10)
- Jake Davies – additional engineering (tracks 1, 4–6, 9)
- Absolute – production (tracks 2, 3, 7, 8, 10)
- Jeremy Wheatley – engineering (tracks 2, 7, 8, 10)
- Paul Hicks – engineering (track 3)
- Robbie Kazandjian – engineering assistance (track 3)
- Jan Kybert – mixing assistance (track 3); engineering assistance (tracks 7, 8, 10)
- Mark Tucker – engineering (track 10)
- Steve Pelluet – engineering assistance (track 10)

== Charts ==
=== Weekly charts ===
Weekly chart performance for Spiceworld
Chart (1997)	Peak position
Australian Albums (ARIA)	2
Austrian Albums (Ö3 Austria)	1
Belgian Albums (Ultratop Flanders)	2
Belgian Albums (Ultratop Wallonia)	4
Canadian Albums (Billboard)	2
Czech Albums (ČNS IFPI)	8
Danish Albums (Hitlisten)	1
Dutch Albums (Album Top 100)	1
European Albums (Music & Media)	1
Finnish Albums (Suomen virallinen lista)	1
French Albums (SNEP)	2
German Albums (Offizielle Top 100)	4
Greek Albums (IFPI)	1
Hungarian Albums (MAHASZ)	5
Icelandic Albums (Tónlist)	1
Irish Albums (IRMA)	1
Italian Albums (FIMI)	2
Japanese Albums (Oricon)	6
Malaysian Albums (RIM)	1
New Zealand Albums (RMNZ)	1
Norwegian Albums (VG-lista)	1
Portuguese Albums (AFP)	3
Scottish Albums (Official Charts)	1
Singapore Albums (SPVA)	1
Spanish Albums (AFYVE)	2
Swedish Albums (Sverigetopplistan)	3
Swiss Albums (Schweizer Hitparade)	2
Taiwanese International Albums (IFPI)	4
UK Albums (Official Charts)	1
US Billboard 200	3
Zimbabwean Albums (ZIMA)	1

Weekly chart performance for Spiceworld
Chart (2020)	Peak position
UK Vinyl Albums|	7

Weekly chart performance for Spiceworld25
Chart (2022)	Peak position
Belgian Albums (Ultratop Wallonia)	125
Spanish Albums (Promusicae)	58
UK Albums (Official Charts)	46
US Soundtrack Albums (Billboard)	20

=== Year-end charts ===
1997 year-end chart performance for Spiceworld
Chart (1997)	Position
Australian Albums (ARIA)	15
Belgian Albums (Ultratop Flanders)	7
Belgian Albums (Ultratop Wallonia)	12
Canadian Albums (Nielsen Soundscan)	20
Danish Albums (Hitlisten)	3
Dutch Albums (Album Top 100)	76
European Albums (Music & Media)	27
French Albums (SNEP)	14
German Albums (Offizielle Top 100)	83
Spanish Albums (AFYPE)	36
Swedish Albums (Sverigetopplistan)	21
UK Albums (OCC)	4

1998 year-end chart performance for Spiceworld
Chart (1998)	Position
Australian Albums (ARIA)	9
Austrian Albums (Ö3 Austria)	14
Belgian Albums (Ultratop Flanders)	20
Belgian Albums Chart (Wallonia)	22
Canada Top Albums/CDs (RPM)	4
Danish Albums (Hitlisten)	21
Dutch Albums (Album Top 100)	21
European Albums (Music & Media)	8
French Albums (SNEP)	43
German Albums (Offizielle Top 100)	29
New Zealand Albums (RMNZ)	7
Swedish Albums (Sverigetopplistan)	99
Swiss Albums (Schweizer Hitparade)	22
UK Albums (OCC)	27
US Billboard 200	10

1999 year-end chart performance for Spiceworld
Chart (1999)	Position
US Billboard 200	178

2000 year-end chart performance for Spiceworld
Chart (2000)	Position
Finnish Albums (Suomen virallinen lista)	52

=== Decade-end charts ===
Decade-end chart performance for Spiceworld
Chart (1990–1999)	Position
US Billboard 200	82

== Certifications and sales ==
Certifications and sales for Spiceworld
Region	Certification	Certified units/sales
Australia (ARIA)	6× Platinum	420,000^{^}
Austria (IFPI Austria)	Platinum	50,000^{*}
Belgium (BRMA)	2× Platinum	100,000^{*}
Brazil (Pro-Música Brasil)	Platinum	250,000^{*}
Canada (Music Canada)	Diamond	1,000,000^{^}
Finland (Musiikkituottajat)	2× Platinum	92,178
France (SNEP)	2× Platinum	600,000^{*}
Germany (BVMI)	Platinum	500,000^{^}
Hong Kong (IFPI Hong Kong)	Platinum	20,000^{*}
Iceland	—	9,054
Italy	—	400,000
Japan (RIAJ)	2× Platinum	400,000^{^}
Mexico (AMPROFON)	Gold	100,000^{^}
Netherlands (NVPI)	Platinum	100,000^{^}
New Zealand (RMNZ)	3× Platinum	45,000^{^}
Norway (IFPI Norway)	Platinum	50,000^{*}
Poland (ZPAV)	2× Platinum	200,000^{*}
Spain (Promusicae)	2× Platinum	200,000^{^}
Sweden (GLF)	2× Platinum	160,000^{^}
Switzerland (IFPI Switzerland)	2× Platinum	100,000^{^}
United Kingdom (BPI)	5× Platinum	1,603,426
United States (RIAA)	4× Platinum	4,200,000
Summaries
Europe (IFPI)	5× Platinum	5,000,000^{*}
Worldwide	—	14,000,000
^{*} Sales figures based on certification alone.^{^} Shipments figures based on certification alone.

== Release history ==
Release dates and formats for Spiceworld
Region	Date	Format(s)	Edition	Label(s)	Ref(s)
Japan	1 November 1997	CD	Standard	EMI Music Japan	
United Kingdom	3 November 1997	CD; LP; cassette	Standard	Virgin	
Canada	4 November 1997	CD	Standard	Virgin	
United States	4 November 1997	CD; cassette; MiniDisc	Standard	Virgin	
United Kingdom	13 March 2020	LP	Deluxe reissue	UMC	
Various	4 November 2022	Digital download; streaming; 2-LP; double cassette; picture disc; clear vinyl	Spiceworld25	UMC; EMI	
Various	16 December 2022	2-CD + hardback book	Spiceworld25	UMC; EMI	
