= Too Much (Spice Girls song) =

1997 single by Spice Girls

Single by Spice Girls

from the album Spiceworld
- B-side: "Outer Space Girls"; "Walk of Life"
- Released: 8 December 1997
- Recorded: June 1997
- Studio: Abbey Road (London)
- Genre: Pop; doo-wop; R&B
- Length: 4:31 (album version); 3:50 (radio edit)
- Label: Virgin
- Songwriters: Spice Girls; Andy Watkins; Paul Wilson
- Producer: Absolute

Spice Girls singles chronology
"Spice Up Your Life" (1997)	"Too Much" (1997)	"Stop" (1998)

Music videos
- "Too Much" on YouTube; "Too Much" (Alternative version) on YouTube

"Too Much" is a song by English girl group the Spice Girls from their second studio album, Spiceworld (1997). The group members co-wrote the song with its producers, Paul Wilson and Andy Watkins—the songwriting and production duo known as Absolute—while the group was shooting scenes for their film Spice World.

Released as the album's second single on 8 December 1997, it topped the UK Singles Chart for two weeks, becoming the group's second consecutive Christmas number-one single, and their sixth consecutive chart-topper, which made them the first act to have its first six singles reach number one in the United Kingdom. It was moderately successful internationally, peaking inside the top 20 on the majority of the charts that it entered. In the United States, "Too Much" fared better than its predecessor, "Spice Up Your Life", peaking at number nine on the Billboard Hot 100 and becoming the group's fourth and final top-10 single on the chart.

The music video, directed by Howard Greenhalgh, features each Spice Girl in their own individual scene playing different characters, inspired by their own film fantasies. The song received mixed reviews from music critics, with many of them criticising the R&B-infused production.

== Background ==
In June 1997, the group began filming scenes for their film Spice World. Simultaneously, Virgin Records started the first marketing meetings for the Spiceworld album's promotional campaign, set to be released in November. Since no songs had been written for the album at that point, the group had to do all the songwriting and recording at the same time as they were shooting the film. Between takes, and at the end of each filming day, the group usually went straight into a mobile recording studio set up in a Winnebago, which followed them between film sets. The schedule was physically arduous with logistical difficulties, as Melanie Brown commented in her autobiography: "doing the two full-time jobs at the same time took its toll and within a couple on weeks, exhaustion set in."

== Writing and recording ==
The concept of "Too Much" was mainly penned by Geri Halliwell while the group was filming Spiceworld in a closed set besieged by fans and the media, in London's Docklands. While Halliwell left the set, sitting in the backseat of a car, she started scribbling a few lines in a notebook about "love being blind and how words that appear deep may be meaningless". The other members then helped to complete the song. Halliwell, inspired by a T-shirt that said "What part of no don't you understand?", wrote the song's middle eight with Melanie Chisholm at Paul Wilson and Andy Watkins'—the songwriting and production duo known as Absolute—studio in Richmond, London. Wilson commented about the song:

Geri came in and sang: 'Too much of something/Da-da-da-da-da...Right. OK. You got that?' We started working on it and we wanted to do some sort of doo-wop vocal thing. So we constructed this backing track and then more of the girls started to come in—this was quite a good day—and gradually they started to add on their little bits.

Absolute structured the song using doo-wop records as a template. The format was for Emma Bunton to sing the high part, Melanie Brown, Victoria Beckham, and Halliwell singing the lower and middle parts, and Chisholm adding the ad-libs. The song was recorded in a caravan in the middle of mayhem. Wilson and Watkins doggedly worked on it with whichever of the group's members were available from the filming set at any given point. A considerable amount of production work was required afterward before the track reached its final form.

== Composition ==
"Too Much"
A 26-second sample of the song, featuring the group during the second chorus. Bunton sings the high part; Brown, Beckham and Halliwell the lower and middle parts, while Chisholm adds the ad-libs.

"Too Much" is a pop ballad, with influences of R&B and doo-wop. It is written in the key of A major with a time signature set in compound quadruple meter, commonly used in doo-wop, and moves at a slow tempo of 80 beats per minute.

The song is constructed in a verse-chorus form, with a bridge before the third chorus, and its instrumentation consists of a guitar, brass and string instruments. It starts with an instrumental introduction, with a chord progression of A–Faug–Dmaj_{7}–G_{7} that is also used during the first part of the verses and the chorus. Brown and Bunton sing the first lines of the first verse; the progression then changes to Bm_{7}–E–Dmaj_{7}–C♯_{7} during the last part of the verse, which is sung by Chisholm. After the chorus, the same pattern occurs leading to the second chorus, with Halliwell, Beckham, and Chisholm singing the second verse. The progression changes to Bm_{7}–C♯m_{7}–Gmaj_{9}–F♯_{7}(♯_{9}) as Chisholm sings the bridge, while the rest of the group adds the high harmony. The group sing the chorus twice, and repeats the ad-lib as the song fades out. The album version, which is 40 seconds longer than the radio edit, features an instrumental section at the end of the track.

== Release ==
"Too Much" was released in the United Kingdom on 15 December 1997, in two single versions. The first, released on cassette and in a standard CD single format, included an exclusive PlayStation postcard from the group's then-upcoming video game Spice World. The track listing contained the radio edit of the track, a Soulshock & Karlin remix, and the B-side "Outer Space Girls"—written by the group with Matt Rowe and Richard Stannard. The second version, released on a standard CD single, contained the radio edit, an orchestral version, and "Walk of Life", a different B-side, written by the group with Absolute. The images on the single's cover were taken from a photoshoot the group did for the October 1997 issue of Elle magazine. In the United States, Virgin Records serviced the song to rhythmic contemporary and contemporary hit radio on 13 January 1998. This was followed by a CD single release on 27 January.

== Reception ==
=== Critical response ===
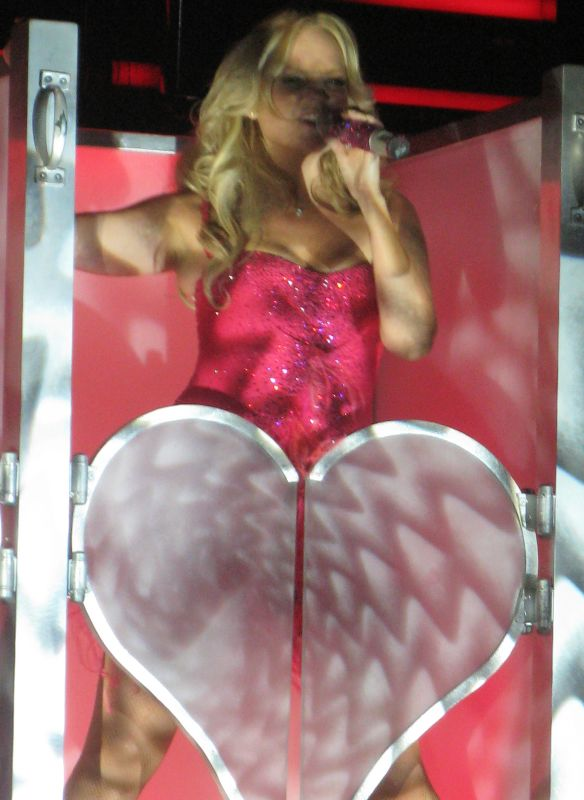
Emma Bunton performing "Too Much" during The Return of the Spice Girls Tour in Las Vegas, December 2007

"Too Much" received mixed reviews from critics. Larry Flick of Billboard magazine praised the song, describing it as a "swishy classic-pop ballad that tickles the ear with tasty doo-wop flavors", and added that the arrangement and the group's harmonies "work extremely well together". David Browne of Entertainment Weekly called it a "sultry slow jam". The Miami Herald dubbed the song a "silky pop ode" and called it "irresistible". British magazine Music Week gave it five out of five, picking it as Single of the Week. The reviewer declared it a "delightfully sweet ballad which will give them another huge Christmas smash, though it's unlikely to match the endurance of their last festive offering, 2 Become 1." Claudia Connell of News of the World said, "Many see this single as make-or-break time. Fortunately it's a million times better than Spice Up Your Life. It's a strong ballad in which Mel C shows that at least one of them can sing." Sylvia Patterson of NME characterised the song as a "lavish, harmonised spree of New Orleans loveliness with strings and Spanish guitar", adding that it is "the absolute tops!". Sputnikmusic's Amanda Murray also complimented the track, calling it a "genuinely great song". Murray also felt that the group's voices had improved so that they could "pull off more difficult passages with at least an iota of conviction". Ian Hyland of the Sunday Mirror enjoyed the track, but felt that Chisholm sounded "daft", and added that she needs to "calm down on the scouse front". The Virginian-Pilot described the strings on the song as "classic soul with a 90s tweak".

Some reviewers criticised the R&B-infused production. In a review of Spiceworld, the Contra Costa Times said that the album's ballads such as "Too Much" and "Viva Forever" are "both treacly and deadly dull". Conversely, Gina Arnold of Salon said that the ballads are "blander but still appealing". The Sun-Sentinel's Sean Picolli viewed the song as "a sincere stab at instructional R&B". Richard Harrington of The Washington Post described it as a "lugubrious ballad", while Scott Schinder of Newsday said that "the contempo-R&B schmaltz of 'Too Much' [...] mires the group in middle-of-the-road mediocrity". J.D. Considine of The Baltimore Sun was not convinced by the song's "attempts at deep emotional expression", and Anthony Violenti of The Buffalo News said that it is "supposed to be a heart tugging ballad that may even make the Spice Girls fan base of 10-year olds overdose on sugar".

=== Commercial performance ===
"Too Much" debuted atop the UK Singles Chart, becoming the Spice Girls' second consecutive Christmas number-one single. It made the group the first act to reach number one with their first six singles, and the first to debut atop the chart five times in a row. The single spent two weeks at number one, and was certified platinum by the British Phonographic Industry (BPI) on 9 January 1998. As of December 2017, it had sold 682,000 copies in the United Kingdom.

"Too Much" was moderately successful in Europe, reaching number three on the Eurochart Hot 100 Singles, peaking inside the top 10 in Denmark, Finland, Ireland, and Spain, and inside the top 20 in Austria, Belgium (both the Flemish and Walloon charts), France, Italy, the Netherlands, Sweden, and Switzerland. The song was also a modest success in Oceania. In New Zealand, it debuted on 21 December 1997 at number 20, peaked at number nine for two weeks, and stayed on the chart for 12 weeks. In Australia, it debuted on the ARIA Singles Chart at number 29, peaking at number nine in its sixth week; it remained on the chart for 15 weeks, and was certified gold by the Australian Recording Industry Association (ARIA).

In the United States, "Too Much" debuted at number 22 on the Billboard Hot 100 on 14 February 1998, selling 30,000 copies in its first week. The following week, "Too Much" peaked at number nine, becoming the group's fourth and final top-10 single. It reached number 36 on the Hot 100 Airplay and number 11 on the Hot 100 Singles Sales chart, and had sold 600,000 copies by January 1999. It had moderate success on individual formats, peaking at number 21 on the Mainstream Top 40 chart, and at number 23 on the Rhythmic Top 40 and Adult Contemporary charts. "Too Much" peaked at nine on the Canadian Singles Chart.

== Music video ==
A scene from the music video, featuring Chisholm dressed in a red cheongsam, in a segment based on the film Year of the Dragon

The music video for "Too Much" was directed by Howard Greenhalgh and filmed on 10 November 1997 in a studio located in London. The video features each Spice Girl in their own individual scene, inspired by their own film fantasies. Melanie Brown is shown singing on top of a tank strapped with ammunition in an industrial post-apocalyptic war scene in a segment based on the film Mad Max Beyond Thunderdome (1985). Emma Bunton is shown in a bedroom dressed in white pyjamas while objects float around her on their own; her scene is based on Poltergeist (1982). Melanie Chisholm is shown in a Chinatown, dressed in a red cheongsam and black pants with her hair in a long ponytail with red streaks; her scene is based upon Year of the Dragon (1985). Geri Halliwell is featured in a black-and-white scene based on Rita Hayworth's performance in Gilda (1946). She is shown performing on a smoky stage in a long, white sequined gown with a group of sailors dancing around her. Victoria Adams is shown in a missile silo next to a smoking rocket, clad in a black catsuit and with a long ponytail; she is portraying Catwoman from Batman Returns (1992).

The "Too Much" music video premiered on 2 December 1997 on the American television network UPN, as part of a one-hour special titled Too Much Is Never Enough. Two versions of the music video exist: the original one, and a version that includes scenes from the group's 1997 film Spice World; the latter was included on the bonus DVD that accompanies the special edition of their 2007 Greatest Hits album. The original version was officially released in December 2022 to mark the release of Spiceworld 25.

== Live performances ==
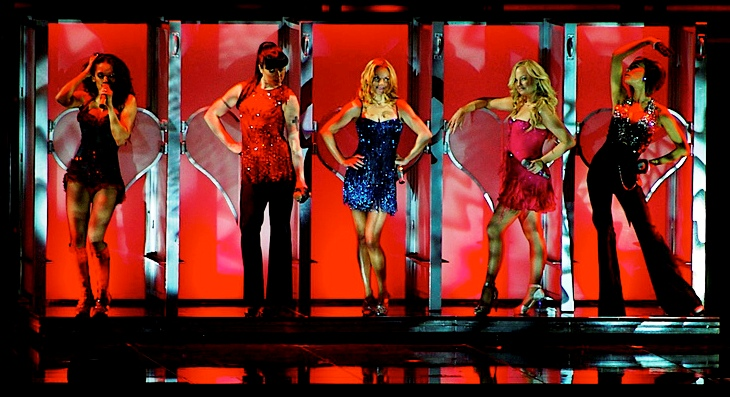
The Spice Girls performing "Too Much" in front of neon pink-coloured, heart-shaped doors in Toronto during The Return of the Spice Girls Tour, February 2008

"Too Much" was performed several times on television, including An Audience with..., Top of the Pops, and the 1997 Royal Variety Performance. The group also performed it at the 1997 Smash Hits! Awards, and at the 25th Annual American Music Awards. During the opening credits of the film Spice World, the Spice Girls perform "Too Much" on Top of the Pops, surrounded by media and photographers from various television programmes and magazines. Also present are hundreds of fans. When the performance is complete, the audience applauds and cheers the girls, and the film progresses into the first official scene. In October 1997, the group performed it as the tenth song of their first live concert at the Abdi Ipekçi Arena in Istanbul, Turkey. The performance was broadcast on Showtime on 17 January 1998 in a pay-per-view concert special titled Spice Girls in Concert: Wild! However, the VHS and DVD release of the concert, Girl Power! Live in Istanbul, does not include the "Too Much" performance.

The group have performed the song on their four tours, the Spiceworld Tour, the Christmas in Spiceworld Tour, the Return of the Spice Girls and the Spice World – 2019 Tour. It remained in the group's live set after Halliwell's departure at the end of the European leg of the Spiceworld Tour; her parts were taken by Bunton. The performance at the tour's final concert was included on the video album Live at Wembley Stadium, filmed in London on 20 September 1998. During The Return of the Spice Girls Tour, the group dressed in tuxedos and performed an uptempo jazzy version of the song, while doing a striptease behind neon pink-coloured, heart-shaped doors.

== Track listings ==
- UK CD 1/Brazilian CD single/European CD single
1. "Too Much" (Radio Edit) – 3:51
2. "Outer Space Girls" – 4:00
3. "Too Much" (Soulshock & Karlin Remix) – 3:52
- UK CD 2/Dutch CD 2/South African CD single/Taiwanese CD 2/Thai CD 2
1. "Too Much" (Radio Edit) – 3:51
2. "Too Much" (orchestral version) – 4:38
3. "Walk of Life" – 4:16
- Digital EP
1. "Too Much" (Radio Edit) – 3:51
2. "Walk of Life" – 4:16
3. "Outer Space Girls" – 4:00
4. "Too Much" (orchestral version) – 4:38
5. "Too Much" (Soulshock & Karlin Remix) – 3:52
6. "Spice Up Your Life" (Murk Havana FM Radio Mix) – 3:39
- Australian CD single/Dutch CD 1/Taiwanese CD 1/Thai CD 1/UK CD1 Re-issued
1. "Too Much" (Radio Edit) – 3:51
2. "Outer Space Girls" – 4:00
3. "Spice Up Your Life" (Murk Havana FM Radio Mix) – 3:39
- European 2-track CD single/French CD single
1. "Too Much" (Radio Edit) – 3:51
2. "Outer Space Girls" – 4:00
- Japanese CD single
1. "Too Much" (Radio Edit) – 3:51
2. "Too Much" (Orchestral Version) – 4:38
3. "Walk of Life" – 4:16
4. "Outer Space Girls" – 4:00
- US CD single
1. "Too Much" (Radio Edit) – 3:51
2. "Too Much" (Orchestral Version) – 4:38
3. "Too Much" (Soulshock & Karlin Remix) – 3:52
4. "Outer Space Girls" – 4:00

== Credits and personnel ==
Credits adapted from the liner notes of Spiceworld.

=== Management ===
- Published by Windswept Pacific Music Ltd, 19 Music and BMG Music Publishing Ltd.

=== Personnel ===
- Spice Girls – vocals
- Absolute – production, all instruments
- Paul Hicks – engineering
- Robbie Kazandjian – engineering assistance
- Mark "Spike" Stent – mixing
- Jan Kybert – mixing assistance
- Mike Higham – additional programming
- Kick Horns – brass
- Milton McDonald – guitar
- Stephen Hussey – string arrangements
- Pure Stringz – strings

== Charts ==
=== Weekly charts ===
Weekly chart performance for "Too Much"
Chart (1997–1998)	Peak position
Australia (ARIA)	9
Austria (Ö3 Austria Top 40)	15
Belgium (Ultratop 50 Flanders)	12
Belgium (Ultratop 50 Wallonia)	16
Canada (Canadian Singles Chart)	9
Canada Top Singles (RPM)	13
Canada Adult Contemporary (RPM)	8
Canada Dance/Urban (RPM)	8
Denmark (Tracklisten)	7
Estonia (Eesti Top 20)	16
Europe (European Hot 100 Singles)	3
Finland (Suomen virallinen lista)	3
France (SNEP)	20
Germany (GfK)	21
Honduras (UPI)	5
Hungary (MAHASZ)	3
Iceland (Íslenski Listinn Topp 40)	31
Ireland (IRMA)	4
Italy (FIMI)	4
Italy Airplay (Music & Media)	4
Latvia (Latvijas Top 20)	7
Netherlands (Dutch Top 40)	15
Netherlands (Single Top 100)	15
New Zealand (Recorded Music NZ)	9
Scottish Singles Sales (Official Charts)	1
Spain (AFYVE)	9
Sweden (Sverigetopplistan)	18
Switzerland (Schweizer Hitparade)	18
Taiwan (IFPI)	7
UK Singles (Official Charts)	1
UK Airplay (Music Week)	2
US Billboard Hot 100	9
US Adult Contemporary (Billboard)	23
US Pop Airplay (Billboard)	21
US Rhythmic Airplay (Billboard)	23

=== Year-end charts ===
1997 year-end chart performance for "Too Much"
Chart (1997)	Position
UK Singles (OCC)	22

1998 year-end chart performance for "Too Much"
Chart (1998)	Position
Australia (ARIA)	75
Brazil (Crowley)	11
Canada Top Singles (RPM)	82
Canada Adult Contemporary (RPM)	35
Europe (European Hot 100 Singles)	44
Netherlands (Single Top 100)	97
UK Singles (OCC)	100
US Billboard Hot 100	69

== Certifications and sales ==
Certifications and sales for "Too Much"
Region	Certification	Certified units/sales
Australia (ARIA)	Gold	35,000^{^}
France (SNEP)	Gold	250,000^{*}
New Zealand (RMNZ)	Gold	5,000^{*}
United Kingdom (BPI)	Platinum	682,000
United States	—	600,000
^{*} Sales figures based on certification alone.^{^} Shipments figures based on certification alone.

== Release history ==
Release dates and formats for "Too Much"
Region	Date	Format(s)	Label(s)	Ref.
France	8 December 1997	Maxi CD 1	EMI	
Germany	8 December 1997	Maxi CD 1	EMI	
Germany	15 December 1997	Maxi CD 2	EMI	
United Kingdom	15 December 1997	Cassette; two maxi CDs	Virgin	
United States	13 January 1998	Contemporary hit radio; rhythmic contemporary radio	Virgin	
France	16 January 1998	Maxi CD 2	EMI	
Japan	16 January 1998	Maxi CD	Toshiba EMI	
United States	27 January 1998	Cassette; maxi CD	Virgin	
