= Spiceworld Tour =

1998 concert tour by the Spice Girls

Spiceworld Tour 1998
- Debut tour by Spice Girls
- Tour programme cover
- Location: North America; Europe
- Associated album: Spice; Spiceworld
- Start date: 24 February 1998
- End date: 20 September 1998
- Legs: 3
- No. of shows: 56 in Europe; 40 in North America; 96 in total
- Attendance: 2.1 million (estimated)

Spice Girls concert chronology
- Girl Power! Live in Istanbul (1997); Spiceworld Tour (1998); Christmas in Spiceworld Tour (1999)

The Spiceworld Tour (also known as Spice Girls in Concert and the Girl Power Tour '98) was the debut concert tour by English girl group the Spice Girls. It was launched in support of their first two studio albums, Spice (1996) and Spiceworld (1997). The sell-out European/North American tour ran from February to August 1998, after which it returned to the UK in September 1998 for a series of stadium shows. The final concert at London's Wembley Stadium was filmed and broadcast live on pay-per-view, for later VHS release in 1998 and eventual DVD release in 2008.

The tour saw the group perform to an estimated 2.1 million fans over 97 total shows, covering the UK, continental Europe and North America. The 41-date sold-out North American leg of the tour played to over 720,000 fans and grossed $60 million. The first UK portion of the tour saw the group play 20 arena shows to over 350,000 fans; the second UK portion of the tour saw the group play two Don Valley Stadium shows to 76,000 fans, and two Wembley Stadium shows to 150,000 fans. The 1998 Spiceworld Tour remains the highest-grossing tour ever by a female group.

== Background ==
The Spiceworld Tour was the first global tour staged by the group, and proved to be an almost instant sell-out. Tickets for the first two shows in Ireland sold out within 2 hours, and various shows on the North American leg such as Los Angeles, Toronto and Philadelphia sold out within mere minutes of sale. In New York City, the group set the record for the quickest ever sell-out, selling 13,000 tickets for Madison Square Garden in less than 12 minutes. Such was the interest, it led to State Attorney General Dennis Vacco (together with the co-operation of the group) to investigate whether illegal scalping to ticket brokers had taken place – a claim that was later dropped by the Attorney General's office.

The tour kicked off in Dublin, Ireland on 24 February 1998 before moving on to mainland Europe. Days before the end of the European portion of the tour, Geri Halliwell did not appear for shows in Oslo, Norway. Halliwell's final performances occurred in Helsinki, Finland at the Hartwall Arena. Promotional appearances with the new 4-piece promoting the release of 'Viva Forever' on the National Lottery also claimed that Halliwell was ill. On 31 May 1998, Halliwell announced her departure from the Spice Girls. Through her solicitor she stated: "Sadly I would like to confirm that I have left the Spice Girls. This is because of differences between us. I'm sure the group will continue to be successful and I wish them all the best." The Spice Girls quickly released a statement which stated that the North American leg of the tour would continue as planned with the remaining group members.

The Spice Girls finally wrapped up the tour by performing to 150,000 fans over two gigs at Wembley Stadium in September 1998.

== Concert synopsis ==
Against a futuristic space-age themed backdrop, the show began with a CGI video introduction of a spaceship flying through the galaxy. The introduction included William Shatner as the narrator in a parody of his famous Star Trek title sequence speech, and included samples from "Wannabe", "Say You'll Be There", "2 Become 1" and "Mama". The spaceship was shown to land on earth and as its doors appeared to open so did the door at the back of the stage to reveal the Spice Girls. The group members were dressed in futuristic costumes, the first of 11 costume changes. They entered the stage performing "If U Can't Dance", followed by "Who Do You Think You Are", which included an introduction sample from Club 69's "Diva" and RuPaul's "Supermodel (You Better Work)". Accompanied by the tour dancers, referred to as the "Spice Boys", the group then performed "Do It" as their third song during the European leg of the tour; for the North American leg the third song was changed to "Step To Me".

After a brief costume change, the group returns to the stage to perform "Denying". In this performance, Geri Halliwell played the role of a waitress, Mel B the role of a gambler, Victoria Adams the role of a dancer, Emma Bunton the role of a gangster's girlfriend and Melanie C the role of a club owner. The group then sang "Too Much" sat down on chairs. After another costume change, the group performed "Stop". Kenny Ho, their stylist and costume designer, dressed the group in '60s themed clothing to fit the Motown-influenced song. Halliwell's costume was inspired by Madonna's "Holiday section from her Blond Ambition World Tour. After "Stop", Bunton sang a solo rendition of "Where Did Our Love Go?" by The Supremes. Bunton had stated that "I've always been a fan of Diana Ross, that song is perfect for me, it's just the right pitch. I wouldn't want to do a song I found hard to sing." The group then performed "Move Over", portraying supermodels on a runway, dressed in outrageous, outlandish clothes. The dancers, dressed in black, play the role of photographers. Originally, they were going to have Adams wear a chainmail Versace dress with linked gold squares. However, the dress was too heavy and too impractical for maintenance. After the performance of "Move Over", there was a thirty-minute intermission.

The second segment begins with "The Lady Is a Vamp". For this performance, the group wore tailcoats while the dancers wore bowler hats. Then they perform Say You'll Be There, dancing with canes. The group performed "Naked" next, singing from behind chairs to give the illusion that they were naked. The group then sang "2 become 1" wearing velvet catsuits. Ho wanted something luxurious, but not too over the top and felt that velvet was perfect, and it matched the song's feel as well, which was quiet and atmospheric. After "2 Become 1", they performed "Walk of Life". Mel B & Melanie C then covered "Sisters Are Doin' It for Themselves", which was originally sung by Annie Lennox and Aretha Franklin. The group then returned to the stage and sang "Wannabe", "Spice Up Your Life" and "Mama". For their performance of "Mama", they set on steps above the stage, with three huge video screens projecting childhood photos of each member. In their next performance of "Viva Forever", all five group members were dressed in white clothing, as their costume designer Ho wanted their outfits to reflect a sense of purity and spirituality to fit the song. They were originally going to put dry ice on the stage, but the idea was dropped because it would have made the stage slippery, dangerous and very hard to dance on. During later performances of "Viva Forever", Chisholm would ad-lib the line "Spice Girls forever", in place of the lines "Viva Forever", towards the end of the song. The show ended with a '70s theme, with each group member dressed in a colour scheme arranged by their costume designer Ho to fit their style and character. Brown had a lot of patches of animal prints and greens; Halliwell's tones were different reds and purples; Bunton's were almost entirely bright red, pale blues and pink; Chisholm had very bright colours and Adams had patchwork on her corset. During the encore of the show, they sang "Never Give Up On The Good Times" and a cover of the Sister Sledge song "We Are Family". The Spice Girls exited the stage via the same doors from which they entered on top of the staircase.

== Reception ==
=== Box office ===
Total attendance for the Spiceworld Tour was estimated to be 2.1 million over the 97 shows in the UK, mainland Europe and North America. The 41-date North American leg of the tour grossed $60 million and saw the group perform to over 720,000 fans. The first UK portion of the tour saw the group play 20 arena shows to over 350,000 fans; the second UK portion of the tour saw the group play two Don Valley Stadium shows to 76,000 fans, and two Wembley Stadium shows to 150,000 fans.

=== Critical reception ===
The tour received mixed to positive reviews. Natalie Nichols of the Los Angeles Times wrote that "[t]heir energy and dedication were sincere, even though the music was all unconvincing dance grooves and slick soul-pop, lightly seasoned with funk, hip-hop and rock by a bland six-piece band." On the other hand, The New York Times Jon Pareles felt that "the songs, more than the act, are their real asset. [...] These numbers are exuberant, direct and immediately likeable, and they've turned a group of hard-working but only moderately gifted performers into stars."

BBC News noted the audiences were mostly composed of families, and that even "most of the parents there seemed to be enjoying themselves". Gilbert Garcia of the Phoenix New Times wrote that: "Rarely has any concert experience so carefully worked so many marketing angles at once. For one thing, the Spice Girls have managed to carve out a niche as a pop group that even moms can love, and they offered just enough nostalgia to keep beleaguered parents happy. When Baby Spice embarked on a solo version of The Supremes' "Where Did Our Love Go", or when the group launched into a spirited take on the Annie Lennox-Aretha Franklin duet "Sisters Are Doin' It for Themselves", you could see the mothers in the crowd jump up in appreciation."

Throughout the American leg of the tour, commercials were played on large concert screens before the shows and during intermissions. It was the first time advertising had been used in pop concerts and was met with mixed reactions in the music industry. Garcia wrote that the adverts were a "strange note" in a show that otherwise "delivered what it promised". He also criticised the group's performance of "Move Over", their Pepsi advert song, saying that the "rampant, near-subliminal Pepsi imagery on the video screen, seemed a tad too mercenary for even this ultracommercial setting." On the other hand, tour promoter John Scher acknowledged that, "[T]he cost of touring has become somewhat obscene. If it allows corporate sponsors to put more money into the entertainment world and allows us to see more shows, it's positive." By opening up a whole new source of revenue, industry experts predicted more acts would follow the Spice Girls' lead.

== Broadcasts and recordings ==
The audio of the full show at Birmingham's NEC Arena was broadcast live on BBC Radio 1. Originally, Molly Dineen was meant to film a behind-the-scenes documentary with the Spice Girls during their American leg of the tour. When Geri Halliwell departed from the group, she called Dineen to film a completely separate documentary with her instead. She was replaced by Ian Denyer who directed the documentary, broadcast on Channel 4 and subsequently released on VHS under the title Spice Girls In America: A Tour Story.

The final show at Wembley Stadium was broadcast live on 20 September 1998 on Sky Box Office and presented by Dani Behr and Georgie Stait. A full behind the scenes tour of the stage was also aired prior to the broadcast of the Wembley Stadium concert on MuchMusic in Canada. Live at Wembley Stadium, a video release of the group's show at Wembley Stadium, was released on VHS on 16 November 1998 and on DVD on 6 October 2008.

== Setlist ==
=== Main set (February 24 – July 22, 1998) ===
1. "Video Introduction" (contains samples of Wannabe, Say You'll Be There, 2 Become 1 and Mama)
2. "If U Can't Dance"
3. "Who Do You Think You Are" (contains elements of "Diva" and "Supermodel")"
4. "Do It"
5. "Denying"
6. "Too Much"
7. "Stop"
8. "Where Did Our Love Go?" (Emma Bunton solo)
9. "Move Over"

Intermission

10. "The Lady Is a Vamp"
11. "Say You'll Be There"
12. "Naked"
13. "2 Become 1"
14. "Walk of Life"
15. "Sisters Are Doin' It for Themselves" (Mel B & Melanie C duet)
16. "Wannabe"
17. "Spice Up Your Life"
18. "Mama"

Encore

19. "Viva Forever" (contains excerpts from the film Blade Runner)
20. "Never Give Up on the Good Times"
21. "We Are Family"

=== Alternate setlist (July 24 – August 26, 1998) ===
1. "Video Introduction" (contains samples of Wannabe, Say You'll Be There, 2 Become 1 and Mama)
2. "If U Can't Dance"
3. "Who Do You Think You Are" (contains elements of "Diva" and "Supermodel")"
4. "Step to Me"
5. "Denying"
6. "Too Much"
7. "Stop"
8. "Where Did Our Love Go?" (Emma Bunton solo)
9. "Move Over"

Intermission

10. "The Lady Is a Vamp"
11. "Say You'll Be There"
12. "Naked"
13. "2 Become 1"
14. "Sisters Are Doin' It for Themselves" (Mel B & Melanie C duet)
15. "Wannabe"
16. "Spice Up Your Life"
17. "Mama"

Encore

18. "Viva Forever" (contains excerpts from the film Blade Runner)
19. "Never Give Up on the Good Times"
20. "We Are Family"

=== Back in Britain setlist (September 11 – September 20, 1998) ===
1. "Video Introduction" (contains samples of Wannabe, Say You'll Be There, 2 Become 1 and Mama)
2. "If U Can't Dance"
3. "Who Do You Think You Are" (contains elements of "Diva" and "Supermodel")"
4. "Something Kinda Funny"
5. "Do It"
6. "Too Much"
7. "Stop"
8. "Where Did Our Love Go?" (Emma Bunton solo)
9. "Love Thing"
10. "The Lady Is a Vamp"
11. "Say You'll Be There"
12. "Naked"
13. "2 Become 1"
14. "Sisters Are Doin' It for Themselves" (Mel B & Melanie C duet)
15. "Wannabe"
16. "Spice Up Your Life"
17. "Mama"

Encore

18. "Viva Forever" (contains excerpts from the film Blade Runner)
19. "Never Give Up on the Good Times"
20. "We Are Family"

=== Setlist background ===
- "Who Do You Think You Are" contained a sound bite from the song "Diva" by Club 69 & "Supermodel (You Better Work)" by RuPaul. In the beginning of the song, the phrase "You have to work to get this good" can be heard. The same sound bite had been used previously in televised concerts in Istanbul in 1997.
- During the European leg of the tour, "Move Over" featured some rather interesting lyrical changes. Instead of the usual "dedication, babynation etc...", the girls would alternate the lyrics with "penetration, menstruation, lubrication and masturbation" on various nights (in the predominantly non-English speaking countries).
- "Naked" sampled two sound bites from the film Batman Forever. In the beginning of the song, dialogue from the motion picture was included, saying "Relax. Tell me your dreams, tell me your fantasies, tell me your secrets, tell me your deepest, darkest, fears." In the middle of the song, the Riddler's growls were heard.
- The original "London town" lyric in "Walk of Life" was replaced by the name of the city the girls were performing in. The lyrics varied depending on the pronunciation of the city name, for example "Birmingham", "Antwerp Town", or "Boston City".
- "Viva Forever" sampled a sound bite from the film Blade Runner. In the beginning of the song the famous words "The light that burns twice as bright burns half as long, and you my friend, have burned so very, very brightly" spoken by Dr. Eldon Tyrell are heard. This inspired a similar, revamped sound bite that was used during "Who Do You Think You Are" on The Return of the Spice Girls Tour. This sound bite consisted of a deep, male, American-accented voice saying "The flame that burns twice as bright burns half as long, and you, my friend, have burned the brightest".
- After Geri Halliwell's departure, a pre-recorded backing track of Geri's vocals were used during the Spanish Rap in "If U Can't Dance" and the remaining girls sang her original "Ginger" lyric in "The Lady Is a Vamp". In other songs her lines were distributed by the remaining members, with notably Victoria finally singing lead in "Wannabe" after Halliwell's departure.
- Starting in Noblesville, Indiana on July 24, "Step to Me" replaced "Do It", and "Walk of Life" was removed from the setlist (“Walk of Life” was still performed, sporadically, during various dates for the duration of the US leg of the tour). Both of these changes were due to several dancers' injuries, as well as the (unannounced at the time) pregnancies of Mel B and Victoria Beckham, who were lifted and carried around by dancers during "Walk of Life."
- As presented on Sky Box Office Live, there was no 30-minute intermission during the "Back in Britain" leg of the tour, and additional songs were added to the setlist. "Something Kinda Funny" replaced "Denying", and "Step to Me" was dropped. "Do It" was added back to the setlist. "Something Kinda Funny", "Do It", and "Too Much" were reimagined into their own second act, with a new set of suit-like outfits, replacing the restaurant act. "Love Thing" replaced "Move Over", in the middle of the show, as a one-song act with a dancers’ intro and another wardrobe change.

== Tour dates ==
Date	City	Country	Venue
Europe
24 February 1998	Dublin	Ireland	Point Theatre
25 February 1998	Dublin	Ireland	Point Theatre
2 March 1998	Zürich	Switzerland	Hallenstadion
3 March 1998	Frankfurt	Germany	Festhalle Frankfurt
5 March 1998	Bologna	Italy	PalaMalaguti
6 March 1998	Rome	Italy	Palazzo dello Sport
8 March 1998	Milan	Italy	FilaForum di Assago
9 March 1998	Milan	Italy	FilaForum di Assago
11 March 1998	Marseille	France	Le Dôme de Marseille
13 March 1998	Barcelona	Spain	Palau Sant Jordi
16 March 1998	Madrid	Spain	Palacio de Deportes
19 March 1998	Lyon	France	Halle Tony Garnier
20 March 1998	Lausanne	Switzerland	Patinoire de Malley
22 March 1998	Paris	France	Zénith de Paris
23 March 1998	Paris	France	Zénith de Paris
26 March 1998	Munich	Germany	Olympiahalle
28 March 1998	Arnhem	Netherlands	GelreDome
29 March 1998	Arnhem	Netherlands	GelreDome
31 March 1998	Antwerp	Belgium	Sportpaleis
1 April 1998	Dortmund	Germany	Westfalenhallen
4 April 1998	Glasgow	Scotland	SECC Concert Hall 4
5 April 1998	Glasgow	Scotland	SECC Concert Hall 4
7 April 1998	Manchester	England	NYNEX Arena
8 April 1998	Manchester	England	NYNEX Arena
11 April 1998	Manchester	England	NYNEX Arena
12 April 1998	Manchester	England	NYNEX Arena
14 April 1998	London	England	Wembley Arena
15 April 1998	London	England	Wembley Arena
18 April 1998	London	England	Wembley Arena
19 April 1998	London	England	Wembley Arena
21 April 1998	London	England	Wembley Arena
22 April 1998	London	England	Wembley Arena
25 April 1998	London	England	Wembley Arena
26 April 1998	London	England	Wembley Arena
28 April 1998	Birmingham	England	NEC Arena
29 April 1998	Birmingham	England	NEC Arena
2 May 1998	Birmingham	England	NEC Arena
3 May 1998	Birmingham	England	NEC Arena
5 May 1998	Birmingham	England	NEC Arena
6 May 1998	Birmingham	England	NEC Arena
12 May 1998	Paris	France	Palais Omnisports de Paris-Bercy
13 May 1998	Paris	France	Palais Omnisports de Paris-Bercy
15 May 1998	Vienna	Austria	Wiener Stadthalle
16 May 1998	Vienna	Austria	Wiener Stadthalle
19 May 1998	Stockholm	Sweden	Stockholm Globe Arena
20 May 1998	Stockholm	Sweden	Stockholm Globe Arena
22 May 1998	Copenhagen	Denmark	Forum Copenhagen
23 May 1998	Copenhagen	Denmark	Forum Copenhagen
25 May 1998	Helsinki	Finland	Hartwall Areena
26 May 1998	Helsinki	Finland	Hartwall Areena
28 May 1998	Oslo	Norway	Oslo Spektrum
29 May 1998	Oslo	Norway	Oslo Spektrum
North America
15 June 1998	West Palm Beach	United States	Coral Sky Amphitheatre
16 June 1998	Orlando	United States	Orlando Arena
18 June 1998	Atlanta	United States	Coca-Cola Lakewood Amphitheatre
20 June 1998	Charlotte	United States	Blockbuster Pavilion
21 June 1998	Bristow	United States	Nissan Pavilion
24 June 1998	Virginia Beach	United States	GTE Virginia Beach Amphitheater
25 June 1998	Holmdel	United States	PNC Bank Arts Center
27 June 1998	Philadelphia	United States	CoreStates Center
29 June 1998	Wantagh	United States	Jones Beach Amphitheater
1 July 1998	New York City	United States	Madison Square Garden
3 July 1998	Hartford	United States	Meadows Music Theatre
4 July 1998	Buffalo	United States	Darien Lake Performing Arts Center
6 July 1998	Scranton	United States	Montage Mountain Performing Arts Center
8 July 1998	Mansfield	United States	Great Woods Amphitheatre
10 July 1998	Montreal	Canada	Molson Centre
11 July 1998	Toronto	Canada	Molson Amphitheatre
14 July 1998	Cuyahoga Falls	United States	Blossom Music Center
15 July 1998	Burgettstown	United States	Coca-Cola Star Lake Amphitheater
18 July 1998	Nashville	United States	Starwood Amphitheatre
20 July 1998	Cincinnati	United States	Riverbend Music Center
22 July 1998	Columbus	United States	Polaris Amphitheater
24 July 1998	Noblesville	United States	Deer Creek Music Center
26 July 1998	Auburn Hills	United States	The Palace of Auburn Hills
27 July 1998	Tinley Park	United States	New World Music Theatre
29 July 1998	Milwaukee	United States	Marcus Amphitheater
31 July 1998	Minneapolis	United States	Target Center
2 August 1998	Maryland Heights	United States	Riverport Amphitheatre
3 August 1998	Bonner Springs	United States	Sandstone Amphitheater
5 August 1998	Greenwood Village	United States	Fiddler's Green Amphitheatre
8 August 1998	Tacoma	United States	Tacoma Dome
9 August 1998	Portland	United States	Rose Garden
11 August 1998	Vancouver	Canada	General Motors Place
13 August 1998	Mountain View	United States	Shoreline Amphitheatre
15 August 1998	Inglewood	United States	Great Western Forum
16 August 1998	San Bernardino	United States	Blockbuster Pavilion
19 August 1998	Las Vegas	United States	Thomas & Mack Center
21 August 1998	Chula Vista	United States	Coors Amphitheatre
22 August 1998	Phoenix	United States	Blockbuster Desert Sky Pavilion
25 August 1998	The Woodlands	United States	Cynthia Woods Mitchell Pavilion
26 August 1998	Dallas	United States	Coca-Cola Starplex Amphitheatre
Europe
11 September 1998	Sheffield	England	Don Valley Stadium
12 September 1998	Sheffield	England	Don Valley Stadium
19 September 1998	London	England	Wembley Stadium
20 September 1998	London	England	Wembley Stadium

== Personnel ==
=== Vocals ===
- Mel B
- Emma Bunton
- Melanie C
- Victoria Adams
- Geri Halliwell (until 26 May 1998 live but her studio vocal remained in "If U Can't Dance")

=== Band ===
- Simon Ellis – Musical Director / Keyboards
- Andy Gangadeen – Drums
- Paul Gendler – Guitars
- Fergus Gerrand – Percussion
- Steve Lewinson – Bass
- Michael Martin – Keyboards

=== Dancers ===
- Louie Spence
- Takao Baba
- Carmine Canuso (aka Jake Canuso)
- Jimmy Gulzar
- Eszteca Noya
- Robert Nurse
- Christian Storm (until Halliwell's departure)

== See also ==
- List of highest-grossing concert tours by women
