= Stop (Spice Girls song) =

1998 single by Spice Girls

Single by Spice Girls

from the album Spiceworld
- B-side: "Ain't No Stoppin' Us Now"
- Released: 9 March 1998
- Recorded: 1997
- Studio: Olympic, London
- Genre: Dance-pop; soul-pop
- Length: 3:24
- Label: Virgin
- Songwriters: Spice Girls; Andrew Watkins; Paul Wilson
- Producer: Absolute

Spice Girls singles chronology
"Too Much" (1997)	"Stop" (1998)	"(How Does It Feel to Be) On Top of the World" (1998)

Music video
- "Stop" on YouTube

"Stop" is a song by English girl group the Spice Girls from their second studio album, Spiceworld (1997). The group co-wrote the song with its producers, Paul Wilson and Andy Watkins of the Absolute production duo, during the filming of the film Spice World.

"Stop" is a dance-pop song with influences of Motown and blue-eyed soul, and features guitar and brass. Its lyrics are about the group's frustrations with being overworked by their management. The music video, directed by James Brown and filmed in Ireland, features the Spice Girls in a 1960s working-class street playing children's games with young girls. The song received mostly positive reviews for its Motown influences and production. The Spice Girls performed "Stop" in a number of live appearances in Europe and North America including their three tours.

Released by Virgin as the album's third single in March 1998, it peaked at number two on the UK Singles Chart, behind "It's Like That" by Run-DMC vs Jason Nevins, ending the Spice Girls' streak of consecutive number-one singles on the chart at six, and becoming the group's only single during their original tenure to not reach number one on said chart. It was moderately successful internationally, peaking inside the top 20 on the majority of the charts that it entered. In the United States, "Stop" peaked at number 16 on the Billboard Hot 100, becoming the group's sixth consecutive top-20 entry on the chart.

== Background and writing ==
In June 1997, the group began shooting scenes for their film Spice World. Simultaneously, Virgin Records started the first marketing meetings for the Spiceworld album's promotional campaign, which was set to be released in November. No songs had been written for the album at this point, so the group had to do all the song-writing and recording at the same time as they were making the film. Between takes, and at the end of each filming day, the group usually went straight into a mobile recording studio set up in a Winnebago, which followed them between film sets. The schedule was physically arduous with logistical difficulties; Melanie Brown commented in her autobiography: "doing the two full-time jobs at the same time took its toll and within a couple on weeks, exhaustion set in." The concept of "Stop" was mainly penned by Geri Halliwell. She came up with the first lines of the song and recorded them into a dictaphone; the next day she played the tape to Paul Wilson and Andy Watkins—the songwriters and production duo known as Absolute. The duo then worked with the melody and began playing with it. Halliwell commented in her autobiography:

I wanted something with a Motown feel. Mel C[hisholm] eventually finished off the chorus and we had the basis for a song called "Stop". Later, when we had more time, the other girls came in and we helped write the verses and bridges.

According to Chisholm, "Stop" is about the group's feelings towards fame and their frustration with their management who they felt was overworking them. These frustrations would culminate with them firing their manager Simon Fuller in November 1997.

== Composition ==
Stop
A 22-second sample of the song, featuring the group singing the first chorus. Followed by the first part of the second verse, which consist on the repeated use of the word do, with a backing track that is reminiscent of classic Motown's pop-soul singles.

"Stop" is an up-tempo dance-pop song with influences of Motown and blue-eyed soul, and is reminiscent of classic singles by The Supremes or Martha and the Vandellas. It is written in the key of C major, with a time signature set on common time, and moves at a fast tempo of 132 beats per minute. Lyrically, the song calls for a slowing down on the courtship process, and it is particularly addressed to appeal to the young female audience, as the female to female bonds are not threatened.

It is constructed in a verse-pre-chorus-chorus form, with a bridge before the third and fourth chorus. It starts with an instrumental introduction, and uses a chord progression of C–B♭–Am_{7}–G, that is also used during the verses and the chorus. In the first verse, Halliwell, Chisholm, Bunton, and Beckham sing each one line. The chords change to Dm_{11}–Dm_{9}–Dm_{11}–Dm_{9}–Dm_{7}–Em_{7}–F major_{7}–G during the pre-chorus, followed by the chorus. The same pattern occurs leading to the second chorus, the first part of the second verse consists on the repeated use of the words do and ba da, then Bunton and Chisholm sing the rest of the verse. The group then sing the bridge, and end the song repeating the chorus twice.

== Release ==
"Stop" was released in the United Kingdom on 9 March 1998, in two single versions. The first one, a standard CD single, included the track and live versions of "Something Kinda Funny", "Mama", and "Love Thing", taken from the set of concerts the group did in Istanbul in October 1997. The second version, also released in a standard CD single, contained the track, along with the David Morales remix, the Stretch & Vern's Rock & Roll Mix of the song, and a cover version of McFadden & Whitehead's "Ain't No Stoppin' Us Now", performed along with American singer Luther Vandross. In the United States, Virgin Records serviced "Stop" to contemporary hit radio on 7 April 1998, then released the single as two CD singles on 3 June 1997.

== Reception ==
=== Critical response ===
"Stop" was generally well received by music critics. For Sylvia Patterson of NME, the song is an "obscenely catchy Motown swinger", she added that it is "the proper pop genius destined to be number one until Japan falls into the sea". Rolling Stone magazine's David Wild called it "a retro, Supremes-lite confection that's as undeniable as it is unoriginal." David Browne of Entertainment Weekly characterised it as a "delicious re-creation of Motown-era bop packed with skipping-down-the-street good vibrations". Larry Flick of Billboard magazine said that it has "a bouncy, Supremes-like retro vibe", and called its hook "irresistible". Flick also praised the David Morales remix of the song, calling it "a vibrant, time-sensitive disco ditty", while Howard Scripps from The Press of Atlantic City called it "an obvious girl-group ditty", and added that it "is another potential hit". Conversely, in a review of Spiceworld, Andy Gill of The Independent, called the album a "perky but charmless parade of pop pastiches", and described "Stop" as a "pseudo-Motown stomp".

Stephen Thomas Erlewine from AllMusic, commented that the song "consolidates and expands the group's style [...] [adding] stomping, neo-Motown blue-eyed soul in the vein of Culture Club". Erlewine complimented "Stop" in a review of the group's compilation album, saying that it "is as awesome a slice of obligatory British Tamla/Motown as you'll get". Stewart Mason, also from AllMusic, compared it to Bananarama's classic singles, and called it as "a glorious piece of utterly disposable but wonderful disposable pop". Sputnikmusic's Amanda Murray also complimented the track, saying that it a "is a thoroughly enjoyable upbeat song, completely carefree and lively". Sarah Davis from Music Week described it as an "upbeat, trumpet-led homage to old-school R&B. Very Motown-influenced. [...] an addictive dreamy summer sing-a-long". In a separate review, the magazine gave "Stop" four out of five, calling it "bubbly and catchy enough to rack up the Girls' seventh number one, but not classy enough to hold on to the spot for long." An editor, Alan Jones, felt it is "probably one of the stronger tracks" of Spiceworld, and "simple and sweet". The Virginian-Pilot said that the horns on the song are "classic soul with a 90s tweak". Music critic Roger Catlin of The Buffalo News described it as "a jaunty Motown beat [...] [with] a progirl message". In a review of the group's Greatest Hits album, Digital Spy's Nick Levine said that "Stop" still sounds "like the best song that Motown never produced".

=== Commercial performance ===
"Stop" debuted and peaked at number two on the UK Singles Chart with first-week sales of over 115,000 copies, being kept off the top spot by Jason Nevins' remix of Run–D.M.C.'s 1983 single "It's Like That". It ended the streak of the Spice Girls' consecutive chart-toppers at six (from "Wannabe" to "Too Much"). The single was certified platinum by the British Phonographic Industry (BPI) on 14 August 2020 for sales of 600,000 in the UK.

"Stop" was moderately successful in the rest of Europe. It reached number six on the Eurochart Hot 100, peaked inside the top 10 in Finland, Ireland, the Netherlands, Sweden, and Wallonia, and inside the top 20 in Austria, Flanders, France, and Switzerland. The song was more successful in Oceania. In New Zealand, it debuted on 12 April 1998 at number 13, peaked at number nine, and spent 12 weeks on the chart. In Australia, it debuted on the ARIA Singles Chart at number 11, peaking at number five in its fifth week. It remained on the chart for 22 weeks, and was certified Gold by the Australian Recording Industry Association (ARIA).

In April 1998, "Stop" debuted at number 99 on the Canadian RPM 100 Hit Tracks chart, reaching a peak of number three in its ninth week. In the United States, "Stop" debuted at number 36 the Billboard Hot 100 chart dated 20 June 1998. It peaked two weeks later at number 16 despite little support from radio stations, becoming the group's sixth consecutive top-20 entry on the chart. The song reached number three on the Maxi-Singles Sales chart and saw moderate success on other formats, peaking at number 14 on the Dance Club Play chart and at 37 on the Mainstream Top 40 chart.

== Music video ==
A scene from the music video for "Stop", featuring the Spice Girls performing a hand-action dance in a traditional 1960s-inspired working-class street

The music video for "Stop" was shot on 27 January 1998 in some locations in Ireland, and was directed by James Brown. About the concept, Melanie Brown commented: "There wasn't a storyboard for this video—it was more trial and error. It wasn't planned down to the last detail and was quite a free-for-all. It's like everything we do—complete chaos! [...] And we all want to get our bit in, so the director has to be able to encompass us all, plus put his ideas on top of it, and make it all flow.

The opening segment, reminiscent of a traditional 1960s working-class street of terraced houses, was filmed at Carnew Street in Dublin, and features scenes of each member of the group knocking on different doors. Then during the first chorus, the group performs a hand-action dance, that was also used during their live performances. The second half of the video, set in the town of Rathdrum, County Wicklow, showed the group interacting with young girls in various activities, such as running around the streets dancing, skipping rope, playing hopscotch, cat's cradle and pat-a-cake, hula hooping, Geri horseback riding, and participating in competitions of various kinds. The locals are depicted as working-class people who attend the local fair or have a drink in the pub. At the end of the video, the group performs at a stage in the local hall in front of an audience of young and old people. The audience applauds after the song is finished. Geri can be seen sticking her tongue out and the video ends.

== Live performances ==
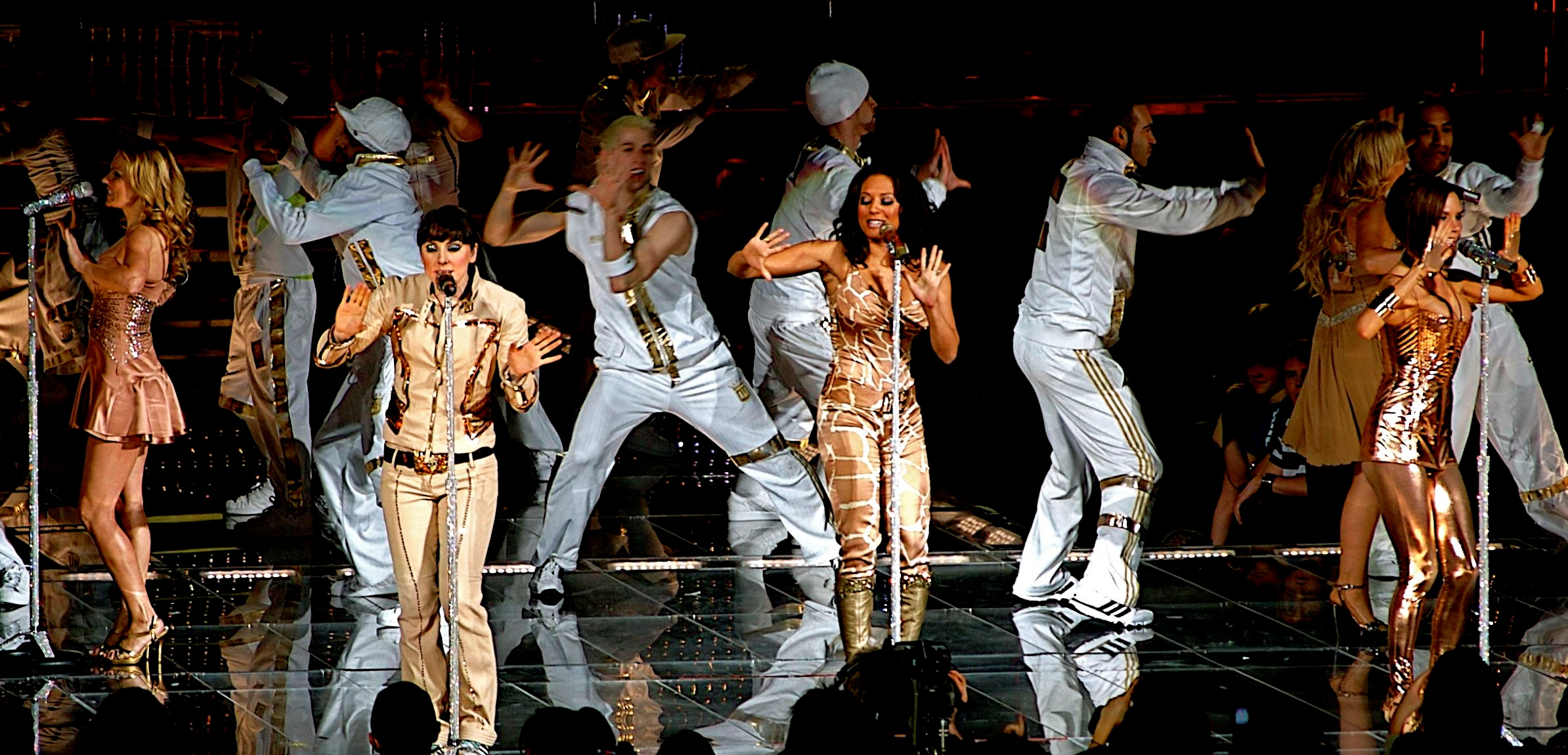
The Spice Girls performing "Stop" in Toronto during The Return of the Spice Girls Tour, dressed in bronze- and copper-coloured outfits by Roberto Cavalli, February 2008

The song was performed several times on television, in both the UK and the US, including An Audience with..., Top of the Pops, The Tonight Show with Jay Leno, and the Late Show with David Letterman. For their "Stop" performance at the 1998 Brit Awards, the group adopted a Supremes-like look, and appeared on the stage in a 1960-style car. The group performed "Stop" without Halliwell at the annually hosted Pavarotti and Friends charity concert in Modena, Italy, in June 1998.

In October 1997, the group performed it as the ninth song of their first live concert at the Abdi Ipekçi Arena in Istanbul, Turkey. The performance was broadcast on Showtime in a pay-per-view concert special titled Spice Girls in Concert: Wild!. However, the VHS and DVD release of the concert, Girl Power! Live in Istanbul, does not include the "Stop" performance. In November 2007, the group performed together for the first time in nearly a decade at the 2007 Victoria's Secret Fashion Show, held in Los Angeles, California. The group dressed in military-themed outfits performed "Stop" miming to a backing track, in front of giant glittering lights that spelled out "Spice" in the background. A taped performance of the group lip-synching the song, while dressed in blue sailor outfits, aired on 17 November 2007 for the Children in Need 2007 marathon. On 8 November 2010, Brown performed "Stop" with the second series' contestants of the Australian edition of The X Factor.

The group have performed the song on their four tours, the Spiceworld Tour, the Christmas In Spiceworld Tour, The Return of the Spice Girls Tour and the Spice World – 2019 Tour. It remained in the group's live set after Halliwell's departure at the end of the European leg of the Spiceworld Tour, her parts were taken by Brown. The performance at the tour's final concert can be found on the video album Live at Wembley Stadium, filmed in London on 20 September 1998. For The Return of the Spice Girls Tour, it was performed as the second song from the show's opening segment. The group dressed in tight bronze- and copper-coloured outfits made by Italian fashion designer Roberto Cavalli. Its intro sampled "It's Like That" by Run-DMC vs Jason Nevins, which famously blocked the song from reaching the top position on UK Singles Chart in 1998.

== Cover versions ==
English rock band The Struts recorded a cover of the song as part of their Sunday Service stream series, which took place during the COVID-19 pandemic lockdowns.

== Use in media ==
"Stop" is featured in series 1 episode 1 of BBC comedy Am I Being Unreasonable?, written by and starring Daisy May Cooper and Seline Hizli.

== Track listings ==
- UK CD 1, Australian CD 1, Brazilian CD single, US CD 1
1. "Stop" (Single Edit) – 3:24
2. "Something Kinda Funny" (Live in Istanbul) – 4:43
3. "Mama" (Live in Istanbul) – 5:18
4. "Love Thing" (Live in Istanbul) – 5:06
- UK CD 2, Australian CD 2, European CD single, Japanese CD single
1. "Stop" (Single Edit) – 3:24
2. "Ain't No Stoppin' Us Now" (featuring Luther Vandross) – 4:55
3. "Stop" (Morales Remix) – 7:23
4. "Stop" (Stretch 'N' Vern's Rock & Roll Mix) – 9:11
- European 2-track CD single
1. "Stop" (Single Edit) – 3:24
2. "Ain't No Stoppin' Us Now" (Featuring Luther Vandross) – 4:55
- US CD 2
1. "Stop" (Single Edit) – 3:24
2. "Stop" (Morales Remix) – 7:23
3. "Stop" (Stretch 'N' Vern's Rock & Roll Mix) – 9:11
4. "Stop" (Morales Dub) – 8:11
- Digital album single
1. "Stop" (Single Edit) – 3:24
2. "Ain't No Stoppin' Us Now" (featuring Luther Vandross) – 4:55
3. "Stop" (Morales Remix) – 7:23
4. "Stop" (Stretch 'N' Vern's Rock & Roll Mix) – 9:11
5. "Something Kinda Funny" (Live in Istanbul) – 4:43
6. "Mama" (Live in Istanbul) – 5:18
7. "Love Thing" (Live in Istanbul) – 5:06
- US cassette single
1. "Stop" (Single Edit) – 3:24
2. "Something Kinda Funny" (Live in Istanbul) – 4:43
3. "Stop" (Morales Remix) – 7:23
- UK promotional 12-inch single
1. A1: "Stop" (Morales Remix) – 9:26
2. A2: "Stop" (Stretch 'N' Vern's Rock & Roll Mix) – 10:56
3. B1: "Stop" (Morales Dub) – 8:11
4. B2: "Stop" (Stretch 'N' Vern's Dub) – 11:17

== Credits and personnel ==
Credits adapted from the liner notes of Spiceworld.

=== Management ===
- Published by Windswept Pacific Music Ltd, 19 Music, and BMG Music Publishing Ltd.

=== Personnel ===
- Spice Girls – vocals
- Absolute – production, all instruments
- Jeremy Wheatley – engineering
- Mark "Spike" Stent – mixing
- Paul "P. Dub" – mixing assistance
- Mike Higham – additional programming
- Kick Horns – brass
- Milton McDonald – guitar

== Charts ==
=== Weekly charts ===
1998 weekly chart performance for "Stop"
Chart (1998)	Peak position
Australia (ARIA)	5
Austria (Ö3 Austria Top 40)	12
Belgium (Ultratop 50 Flanders)	14
Belgium (Ultratop 50 Wallonia)	8
Canada Top Singles (RPM)	3
Canada Adult Contemporary (RPM)	2
Croatia International (HRT) (Note: Only a partial archive of the Croatian chart is available so it is possible that the single had a higher peak.)	9
Denmark (IFPI)	15
Estonia (Eesti Top 20)	3
El Salvador (Notimex)	3
Europe (Eurochart Hot 100)	6
Finland (Suomen virallinen lista)	6
France (SNEP)	12
Germany (GfK)	35
Guatemala (El Siglo de Torreón)	2
Hungary (MAHASZ)	1
Iceland (Íslenski Listinn Topp 40)	15
Ireland (IRMA)	3
Italy (Musica e dischi)	22
Netherlands (Dutch Top 40)	6
Netherlands (Single Top 100)	6
New Zealand (Recorded Music NZ)	9
Scottish Singles Sales (Official Charts)	2
Sweden (Sverigetopplistan)	8
Switzerland (Schweizer Hitparade)	20
Taiwan (IFPI)	10
UK Singles (Official Charts)	2
UK Airplay (Music Week)	3
US Billboard Hot 100	16
US Dance Club Songs (Billboard)	14
US Dance Singles Sales (Billboard)	3
US Pop Airplay (Billboard)	39

2007 weekly chart performance for "Stop"
Chart (2007)	Peak position
UK Downloads (OCC)	64

=== Year-end charts ===
Year-end chart performance for "Stop"
Chart (1998)	Position
Australia (ARIA)	39
Belgium (Ultratop 50 Wallonia)	56
Canada Top Singles (RPM)	36
Canada Adult Contemporary (RPM)	30
Europe (Eurochart Hot 100)	59
France (SNEP)	96
Netherlands (Dutch Top 40)	44
Netherlands (Single Top 100)	62
Sweden (Hitlistan)	76
UK Singles (OCC)	43
UK Airplay (Music Week)	36
US Maxi-Singles Sales (Billboard)	7

== Certifications ==
Sales and certifications for "Stop"
Region	Certification	Certified units/sales
Australia (ARIA)	Gold	35,000^{^}
Belgium (BRMA)	Gold	25,000^{*}
France (SNEP)	Gold	250,000^{*}
New Zealand (RMNZ)	Platinum	30,000^{‡}
United Kingdom (BPI)	Platinum	776,000
United States	—	400,000
^{*} Sales figures based on certification alone.^{^} Shipments figures based on certification alone.^{‡} Sales+streaming figures based on certification alone.

== Release history ==
Release dates and formats for "Stop"
Region	Date	Format(s)	Label(s)	Ref.
France	9 March 1998	Maxi CD 1	EMI	
Germany	9 March 1998	CD; two maxi CDs	EMI	
United Kingdom	9 March 1998	Cassette; two maxi CDs	Virgin	
Japan	25 March 1998	Maxi CD	Toshiba EMI	
United States	7 April 1998	Contemporary hit radio	Virgin	
France	10 April 1998	Maxi CD 2	EMI	
United States	2 June 1998	Cassette; two maxi CDs	Virgin	
