= Girl Power! Live in Istanbul =

1997 concerts by the Spice Girls

- Special concert by Spice Girls
- VHS release cover
- Location: Istanbul, Turkey
- Venue: Abdi İpekçi Arena
- Associated albums: Spice; Spiceworld
- Date: 12–13 October 1997

Spice Girls concert chronology
- Girl Power! Live in Istanbul (1997); Spiceworld Tour (1998)

Girl Power! Live in Istanbul was a two-night concert by English girl group the Spice Girls. The concerts, which were organized by Pepsi as part of the group's sponsorship deal, were performed at the Abdi İpekçi Arena in Istanbul, Turkey on 12 and 13 October 1997.

== Broadcast ==
In the UK, highlights from the concert were broadcast on ITV on 25 December 1997 under the title Spice Up Your Christmas!. The Christmas Day broadcast included a special greeting by the group.

In the US, an airing of the full concert was first made available as a pay-per-view event on 17 January 1998 at 9 p.m. (E.T.) via Showtime Event Television. The broadcast was titled Spice Girls In Concert: Wild! The pay-per-view event was deemed to be "hugely successful", and the concert subsequently premiered on Showtime's main channel on April 5, 1998.

The concert was again aired in the US on Fox Family Channel (formerly USA Network) on Sunday, 16 August 1998 at 6:00 pm. This broadcast coincided with the Spice Girls' first North American tour which was ongoing from 16 June 1998 through the end of August 1998. The televised concert event was titled Spice Girls: Wild! in Concert and, besides the musical performances, featured the same interviews and behind-the-scenes footage included on the home video. The broadcast was roughly two hours in length, including commercials, and managed to receive 1.8 million viewers when it aired, despite being up-against a four-hour Spice Girls MTV special and a different pay-per-view Spice Girls documentary airing that same weekend. All songs from the setlist, except for "Naked", were aired during the broadcast. The concert would go on to be aired several more times on the Fox Family Channel throughout 1998, up-until nearly a year later, in July 1999.

== Set list ==
Act 1

1. Intro / "If U Can't Dance"
2. "Who Do You Think You Are" (with elements of "Diva" by Club 69)
3. "Something Kinda Funny"
4. "Saturday Night Divas"
5. "Say You'll Be There"
6. "Step to Me"

Act 2

7. "Naked" (with excerpts from the film Batman Forever (1995))

Act 3

8. "2 Become 1"
9. "Stop"
10. "Too Much"

Act 4

11. "Spice Up Your Life"
12. "Love Thing"
13. "Mama"

Act 5

14. "Move Over"
15. "Wannabe"

== Home video release ==
Following its live broadcast on television, Girl Power! Live in Istanbul was released on VHS. For the release, the concert was edited down to nine out of the original 15 songs performed, omitting "Something Kinda Funny", "Saturday Night Divas", "Stop", "Too Much", "Love Thing" and "Mama" from the final cut. While solely live vocals were used throughout the concert and its live broadcast, the home video release contains studio vocals that were dubbed into portions of certain songs during post-production.

The program also contains the documentary "Girls Talk! The Story So Far...", which consists of extended interviews with the Spice Girls and behind-the-scenes footage, along with shots recorded during rehearsals and before the shows.

Coinciding with the release of the compilation album Greatest Hits and the Return of the Spice Girls reunion tour, Girl Power! Live in Istanbul was made available on DVD for the first time in 2007.

== Audio release ==
In 1998 the Mégaphone company released a CD with the complete concert of 15 songs in audio format with the voices dubbed from the video edition entitled Spice Songs.

== Personnel ==
=== Vocals ===
- Melanie Brown
- Emma Bunton
- Geri Halliwell
- Victoria Beckham
- Melanie C

=== Band ===
- Simon Ellis – Musical Director / Keyboards
- Andy Gangadeen – Drums
- Paul Gendler – Guitars
- Fergus Gerrand – Percussion
- Steve Lewinson – Bass
- Michael Martin – Keyboards

== Certifications ==
Region	Certification	Certified units/sales
France (SNEP)	Diamond	100,000^{*}
United Kingdom (BPI)	5× Platinum	250,000^{^}
United States (RIAA)	Platinum	100,000^{^}
^{*} Sales figures based on certification alone.^{^} Shipments figures based on certification alone.
