= Step to Me =

Song by Spice Girls

from the album Spiceworld (Japanese edition)
- Released: 28 July 1997
- Recorded: 1996
- Genre: Pop rock; hip hop
- Length: 4:05
- Label: Virgin
- Songwriters: Spice Girls; Eliot Kennedy
- Producer: Absolute

Lyric video
- "Step to Me" on YouTube

"Step to Me" is a song by the British pop group the Spice Girls. It was written by the group members with Eliot Kennedy and produced by Absolute. This song was included on the Japanese edition of the Spice Girls' second album, Spiceworld.

== Background ==
The song was originally written for the group's debut album Spice but did not make the final cut.

In 1997, Pepsi launched a £1 million 'Generation Next' TV campaign in the United Kingdom—running alongside sales promotion activities, notably one where by consumers collected twenty pink ring pull tabs from promotional Pepsi cans, sent them off and received the free Spice Girls CD single "Step to Me"—which was not available in High Street retailers. Collectors were also entered into a free prize draw to see the Spice Girls play their first live concert in Turkey who Pepsi were sponsoring. The advertising and the promotion were integral to Pepsi's marketing strategy, television and press ads and the Pepsi Chart Show (screened on Channel 5) all spelt out that the only way to listen to the single was to buy Pepsi. Producing 92 million promotional packs of the cola, 600,000 CDs were redeemed with the promotion. With a redemption rate of nearly 10 per cent, Pepsi recorded its biggest-ever take up on the promotion and saw its market share rise from 15.1% on 12 July to 19.6% on 9 August, its highest for several years.

The version on the Japanese edition of Spiceworld includes a slightly different version than the 7" Mix; Mel B's rap uses an alternative take and more bass is added.

== Spiceworld25 release ==
On 27 September 2022, it was announced that Spiceworld would be reissued as an expanded Spiceworld25, in celebration of the album's twenty-fifth anniversary. On the same day as the announcement, "Step to Me" was released on all digital platforms for the first time. The track is featured on the tracklist to the Spiceworld25 album released on 4 November 2022.

== Format and track listing ==
- CD Single
1. "Step to Me" (7" Mix) – 4:05
2. "Step to Me" (Matthew's Disco Steppin' Mix) – 7:22
3. "Step to Me" (Matthew's Extra Spicey Dub) – 6:33
4. "Step to Me" (Extended Mix) – 5:41

== Live performances ==
The group performed the song as part of the Girl Power! Live in Istanbul Setlist, as well as during the American leg of the Spiceworld Tour, and the Christmas in Spiceworld Tour. After Geri Halliwell left the group, her solo part was taken over by Mel B for the latter tours. The most notable live performance of the song was on the television programme TFI Friday on 1 May 1998, just three weeks before Halliwell's departure from the group.

== See also ==
- Spice Girls merchandise and sponsorship deals
