= An Audience with... =

Television series

- Also known as: Another Audience with...; One More Audience with...
- Genre: Comedy, drama, Music, Entertainment
- Country of origin: United Kingdom
- Original language: English
- No. of episodes: 60 (list of episodes)

Production
- Running time: 60–90 minutes (including adverts)
- Production companies: ITV Studios; (originally London Weekend Television)

Original release
- Network: ITV; Channel 4 (seven editions)
- Release: 26 December 1980 – present

Related
- ITV Specials

An Audience with... is a British entertainment television show produced by London Weekend Television (now part of ITV Studios), in which a host, usually a singer or comedian, performs for an invited audience of celebrity guests, interspersed with questions from the audience, in a lighthearted revue/tribute style.

== History ==
The show's title began as An Audience with Jasper Carrott, for a normal six-part television series for the comedian. His first television show, it was broadcast in 1978 and produced by London Weekend Television (LWT). From 1980 onwards, the show became An Audience with...[name(s) of host(s)], with one-off special guest hosts performing in front of celebrity audiences.

The show was traditionally broadcast on ITV on Saturday nights, while some shows in the 1980s were broadcast on Channel 4. The show has been commissioned at varying intervals, with ten shows broadcast in the 1980s, followed by twenty in each in the decades of the 1990s and 2000s. From 1994 until 2011 there were at least one show, and often several, broadcast per year, with the exception of 2000 and 2003.

Some hosts appeared multiple times. Dame Edna Everage was host three times, while Freddie Starr, Ken Dodd, Joan Rivers, Shirley Bassey, Al Murray, Donny Osmond and Kylie Minogue were all asked to return once. One show, for Jeremy Beadle, was hosted posthumously in 2008. In 2010, a five-part highlights series of the show, 30 Years of An Audience With, was broadcast on ITV.

More recent shows focused more on musicians and singers rather than comedians - the last comedian given An Audience with... was Al Murray in 2007.

=== An Audience with Jasper Carrott ===
The An Audience With title was first used in a television series produced by London Weekend Television (LWT) for the comedian Jasper Carrott, which aired for six episodes in 1978.

=== An Audience with... ===
From 1980, the show took on a format where a special guest would host a one-off show in front of a celebrity audience, and have their name appended to the title. Dame Edna Everage was the first host of An Audience with... in 1980.

The show has had numerous hosts since then, mostly comedians and singers. Occasionally, pop groups, actors and television presenters also hosted the show. Unusual hosts have included a puppet, Sooty, cast members of ITV soap opera Coronation Street, and boxer Lennox Lewis. The Spice Girls were the first pop group to host the show, in 1997. In 2006, An Audience with Take That was the first time the show was performed live. The second was the next show, An Audience with Lionel Richie.

Hosts were often joined on stage by special guests. Singer Lionel Richie was joined by Westlife, Lulu was joined in a duet with former husband Maurice Gibb, the Bee Gees performed with Boyzone, Ricky Martin was joined by Kylie Minogue, and Take That performed Relight My Fire with Lulu. All round entertainer Des O'Connor was joined on stage by Martine McCutcheon, and dueted with Lionel Richie in a version of "Three Times a Lady". Comedian Ronnie Corbett had his long-time comedy partner Ronnie Barker as his special guest, while Lennox Lewis had football player Ian Wright as his special guest conducting an interview with him.

Comedian hosts often involved audience members on stage, such as Brian Conley's sword-and-card trick on Christine Hamilton performed blindfolded and Freddie Starr's act of seemingly throwing knives at a blindfolded Garry Bushell. Comedians will also interact with the audience, with Freddie Starr throwing maggots over Faith Brown, and Al Murray, in his Pub Landlord persona, spilling drinks over them. Singing based shows also sometimes involved comic relief, with Frank Skinner appearing in drag as one of Lulu's backing singers, and Kylie Minogue being joined on stage by Kermit the Frog for a romantic duet.

=== An Audience Without... Jeremy Beadle ===
After the death of the television practical joker Jeremy Beadle on 30 January 2008, ITV decided to commission An Audience Without... Jeremy Beadle, to celebrate his best work and raise money for some of his favourite charities. Broadcast on 16 May 2008, the show was hosted by Chris Tarrant, and included the results of an ITV public vote choosing his top-5 best ever pranks from his show Beadle's About. This episode was produced by Talent Television.

=== 30 Years of An Audience With ===
In 2010, ITV broadcast 30 Years of An Audience With, looking back at the history of the series, with interviews from past guests, and clips from old shows. The show was broadcast in five-hour-long episodes, from 17 July 2010 to 14 August 2010.

No.	Title	Original release date
1	"Series 1, Episode 1"	17 July 2010
The first episode looked back at the shows featuring Dame Edna Everage, The Spice Girls, Bob Monkhouse, Joe Pasquale and Donny & Marie, and featured interviews including Dame Edna, Mel B, Emma Bunton and Joe Pasquale.
2	"Series 1, Episode 2"	24 July 2010
The second episode looked at the shows hosted by Ken Dodd, Lionel Richie, Brian Conley, Victoria Wood, and Lulu, with interviews from all five hosts.
3	"Series 1, Episode 3"	31 July 2010
The third episode looked at the shows hosted by Freddie Starr, The Bee Gees, Joan Rivers, Bruce Forsyth and Ricky Martin, with interviews including Robin Gibb, Joan Rivers and Bruce Forsyth.
4	"Series 1, Episode 4"	7 August 2010
The fourth episode looked at the shows hosted by Dame Shirley Bassey, Take That, Sir Cliff Richard, Jackie Mason and Jimmy Tarbuck, with interviews from Jackie Mason and Jimmy Tarbuck.
5	"Series 1, Episode 5"	14 August 2010
The fifth episode looked at the shows hosted by Des O'Connor, Al Murray, Ronnie Corbett, Kylie Minogue and Michael Bublé, with interviews from O'Connor, Murray and Corbett.

=== Les Dawson ===
In June 1993, Les Dawson was due to record an edition of An Audience with..., but died a fortnight prior to the planned recording. On the 20th anniversary of the comedian's untimely death, ITV decided to mark the occasion with the use of a technology which gave the illusion he was on stage.

The chief executive of Musion Systems the company that provided the technology, told the Today programme's Sarah Montague: "...it's not actually a hologram but the world perceives what we do as holograms, so we call it holograms." He explained how the technology allows people "to appear as though [they are] on stage".

=== Return to the singer format ===
On 2 November 2021, it was announced that the format would return for one night only on 21 November for a show hosted by Adele. The singer's fourth album, 30, was released two days prior, and this was the first televised performances of songs from the album in the United Kingdom. The special was filmed on 6 November, at the London Palladium, with the audience consisting of Adele's personal heroes, friends, musicians, actors, artists, sportspeople. In the United States, the special aired on 20 March 2022, on NBC. It debuted in New Zealand in May 2022, on TVNZ

In August 2023, ITV announced that An Audience with Kylie would be made by their Lifted Entertainment sub-division (in association with Minogue's label BMG Records), with filming due to take place at the Royal Albert Hall.

== List of episodes ==
No.	Guest	Genre	Channel	Air date	Notes
1	Barry Humphries as Dame Edna Everage	Comedian/Fictional Character	ITV	26 December 1980	
2	Dudley Moore	Actor	ITV	26 December 1981	
3	Kenneth Williams	Actor/Comedian	Channel 4	23 December 1983	
4	Mel Brooks	Comedian	Channel 4	4 February 1984	
5	Joan Rivers	Comedian	Channel 4	17 March 1984	
6	Barry Humphries as Dame Edna Everage	Comedian/Fictional Character	Channel 4	31 December 1984	Titled Another Evening with...
7	Billy Connolly	Comedian	Channel 4	26 October 1985	A longer version of the show was subsequently released on video
8	Peter Ustinov	Actor	Channel 4	3 January 1988	
9	Victoria Wood	Comedian	ITV	10 December 1988	Won two BAFTA awards, subsequently released on video and DVD
10	Barry Humphries as Dame Edna Everage	Comedian/Fictional Character	ITV	25 December 1988	Titled One More Audience with...
11	Jackie Mason	Comedian	Channel 4	27 December 1990	
12	Bob Monkhouse	Comedian	ITV	21 May 1994	
13	Jimmy Tarbuck	Comedian	ITV	22 October 1994	
14	Ken Dodd	Comedian	ITV	3 December 1994	
15	Shirley Bassey	Singer	ITV	21 October 1995	
16	Freddie Starr	Comedian	ITV	2 March 1996	
17	Sooty	Puppet	ITV	24 October 1996	
18	Paul O'Grady as Lily Savage	Comedian/Fictional Character	ITV	6 November 1996	Titled An Evening with...
19	Bruce Forsyth	Presenter	ITV	1 February 1997	
20	Warren Mitchell as Alf Garnett	Actor/Fictional Character	ITV	5 April 1997	
21	Elton John	Singer	ITV	27 September 1997	
22	Freddie Starr	Comedian	ITV	11 October 1997	Titled Another Audience with...
23	Ronnie Corbett	Comedian	ITV	25 October 1997	
24	Spice Girls	Pop Group	ITV	29 November 1997	All-female audience
25	Rod Stewart	Singer	ITV	30 May 1998	
26	Bee Gees	Pop Group	ITV	7 November 1998	
27	Simply Red	Pop Group	ITV	12 December 1998	
28	Lennox Lewis	Sportsman (Boxer)	ITV	3 April 1999	Took the form of an interview with Lewis conducted by Ian Wright
29	Tom Jones	Singer	ITV	25 September 1999	
30	Sir Cliff Richard	Singer	ITV	13 November 1999	Featuring members of Chicken Shed Theatre Company
31	Diana Ross	Singer	ITV	11 December 1999	
32	Des O'Connor	Presenter	ITV	20 January 2001	
33	Ricky Martin	Singer	ITV	10 February 2001	
34	Kylie Minogue	Singer	ITV	6 October 2001	
35	Ken Dodd	Comedian	ITV	9 February 2002	Titled Another Audience with...
36	Lulu	Singer	ITV	18 May 2002	
37	Brian Conley	Comedian	ITV	25 May 2002	
38	Donny Osmond	Singer	ITV	23 November 2002	
39	Harry Hill	Comedian	ITV	16 October 2004	
40	Joe Pasquale	Comedian	ITV	19 February 2005	
41	Al Murray as The Pub Landlord	Comedian/Fictional Character	ITV	19 March 2005	
42	Joan Rivers	Comedian	ITV	14 January 2006	Second show, but titled An Audience with...
43	Shirley Bassey	Singer	ITV	10 March 2006	Titled Another Audience with...
44	Coronation Street	Soap Opera	ITV	22 April 2006	
45	Take That	Pop Group	ITV	2 December 2006	First live edition titled An Audience With Take That: Live!
46	Lionel Richie	Singer	ITV	9 December 2006	Second live edition
47	Al Murray as The Pub Landlord	Comedian/Fictional Character	ITV	27 October 2007	Titled Another Audience With, last comedian to be given An Audience With to date.
48	Celine Dion	Singer	ITV	22 December 2007	
49	Jeremy Beadle	Presenter	ITV	16 May 2008	Posthumous; titled An Audience Without... and hosted by Chris Tarrant
50	Neil Diamond	Singer	ITV	31 May 2008	
51	Donny and Marie Osmond	Singers	ITV	11 November 2009	Donny returns after hosting in 2002
52	Michael Bublé	Singer	ITV	23 May 2010	
53	Barry Manilow	Singer	ITV	28 October 2011	
54	Les Dawson	Comedian	ITV	1 June 2013	Posthumous; titled An Audience with That Never Was. Dawson was due to host in 1993, but died 2 weeks before the planned recording date.
55	Adele	Singer	ITV	21 November 2021	Recorded at the London Palladium.
56	Kylie Minogue	Singer	ITV	10 December 2023	Second show, but titled An Audience with Kylie. Recorded at the Royal Albert Hall.

== Home media ==
In 2007, selected An Audience with... shows were individually released on DVD. Prior to this, the October 1985 show featuring Billy Connolly had been issued on its own, both in VHS format and on DVD. Virgin Video released the extended uncut studio version, with a runtime of approximately 78 minutes, instead of the 50-minute television version. On 14 November 2005, Network released An Audience with Dame Edna Everage, which featured all three appearances, across two discs and became a bestseller.

As of 2021, eleven An Audience with... shows have been made available on the video on demand service, BritBox. The episodes available were hosted by Harry Hill, Billy Connolly, Bob Monkhouse, Sir Cliff Richard, Jimmy Tarbuck, Ken Dodd, Kenneth Williams, Peter Ustinov, Ronnie Corbett, Shirley Bassey and Victoria Wood.

An Audience with Adele was the first to be made available on ITVX.
