= Edyta Górniak discography =

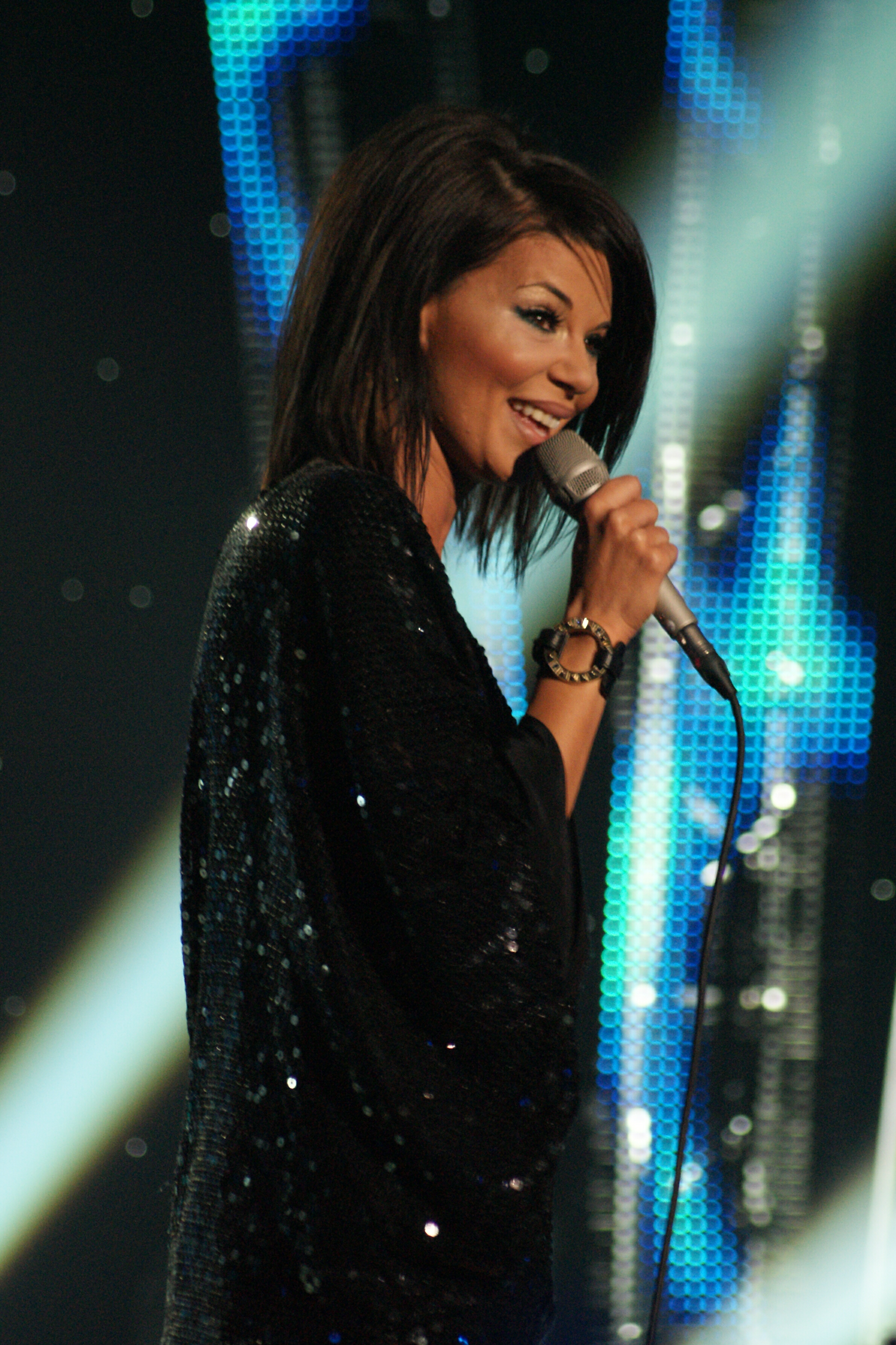
- Edyta Górniak at the Poland's national final for the Eurovision Song Contest 2011
- Studio albums: 8
- Live albums: 1
- Compilation albums: 6
- Singles: 69
- Music videos: 31

A listing of releases by Edyta Górniak (also known mononymously as Edyta), a Polish pop singer.

== Albums ==
=== Studio albums ===
List of studio albums, with selected chart positions and certifications
Title	Album details	Peak chart positions					Certifications
Title	Album details	POL	FIN	NOR	SWE	SWI	Certifications
Dotyk	Released: 9 May 1995; Label: Pomaton EMI; Formats: Cassette, CD, digital download, streaming	17	—	—	—	—	ZPAV: Diamond
Edyta Górniak aka Kiss Me, Feel Me	Released: 7 November 1997 (JPN), 10 November 1997 (POL); Label: Pomaton EMI, Toshiba EMI; Formats: Cassette, CD, digital download, streaming	—	22	13	18	40	ZPAV: Platinum
Perła	Released: 9 March 2002; Label: Pomaton EMI; Formats: Cassette, CD, digital download, streaming	1	—	—	—	—	ZPAV: Gold
Invisible	Released: 31 March 2003; Label: Virgin Records; Formats: Cassette, CD	—	—	—	—	—	
EKG	Released: 12 October 2007; Label: Agora SA; Format: CD, digital download, streaming	—	—	—	—	—	ZPAV: Platinum
Zakochaj się na Święta w kolędach	Released: 22 December 2008; Label: Agora SA; Format: CD	—	—	—	—	—	
My	Released: 14 February 2012; Label: Anaconda Productions; Formats: CD, digital download, streaming	4	—	—	—	—	
My Favourite Winter	Released: 14 November 2024; Label: Warner Music Poland; Formats: CD, digital download, streaming	15	—	—	—	—	
"—" denotes items which were not released in that country or failed to chart.

=== Live albums ===
List of live albums
Title	Album details
Live '99	Released: 25 September 1999; Label: Pomaton EMI; Formats: Cassette, CD, digital download, streaming

=== Compilation albums ===
List of compilation albums
Title	Album details
5 największych przebojów	Released: 16 September 1999; Label: Pomaton EMI; Format: CD
Złota kolekcja: Dotyk	Released: 22 March 2004; Label: Pomaton EMI; Formats: CD, digital download, streaming
Dyskografia	Released: 17 March 2006; Label: Pomaton EMI; Formats: Box set, CD, DVD
The Best of Edyta Górniak	Released: 20 May 2008; Label: Marquard Media; Format: CD
Kolekcja 20-lecia Pomatonu	Released: 11 November 2010; Label: Pomaton EMI; Formats: Box set, CD
Winyloteka: Edyta Górniak	Released: 27 November 2020; Label: Warner Music Poland; Format: LP

== Singles ==
=== As lead artist ===
List of singles as lead artist, with selected chart positions and certifications, showing year released and album name
Title	Year	Peak chart positions										Certifications	Album
Title	Year	POL Air.	POL Stream.	AUT	BEL (FL)	CZR	EU Air.	FRA	GER	SWE	SWI	Certifications	Album
"Once in a Lifetime – To nie ja"	1994	—	*	—	—	—	—	—	—	—	—	ZPAV: Gold	Dotyk
"Jestem kobietą"	1994	—	*	—	—	—	—	—	—	—	—		Dotyk
"Dotknij..."	1995	—	*	—	—	—	—	—	—	—	—		Dotyk
"Będę śniła"	1995	—	*	—	—	—	—	—	—	—	—		Dotyk
"Pada śnieg" (featuring Krzysztof Antkowiak)	1995	—	98	—	—	—	—	—	—	—	—		Dotyk
"Kolorowy wiatr"	1995	—	*	—	—	—	—	—	—	—	—		Pocahontas (Polish-language version)
"Love Is on the Line"	1995	—	*	—	—	—	—	—	—	—	—	ZPAV: Platinum	Non-album singles
"To Atlanta"	1996	—	*	—	—	—	—	—	—	—	—		Non-album singles
"When You Come Back To Me"	1997	—	*	—	39	—	—	—	—	23	—		Edyta Górniak
"Hope for Us" (with José Carreras)	1997	—	*	—	—	—	—	—	—	—	—		Edyta Górniak (Polish edition)
"Lustro"	1998	—	*	—	—	—	—	—	—	—	—		Mulan (Polish-language version)
"Dumka na dwa serca" (with Mieczysław Szcześniak)	1998	—	*	—	—	—	—	—	—	—	—		With Fire and Sword
"Anything"	1998	—	*	—	58	—	—	—	—	—	—		Edyta Górniak
"Stop!"	1999	—	*	—	—	—	—	—	—	—	—		Live '99
"One & One"	1999	—	*	—	68	—	28	46	79	—	42		Edyta Górniak
"Linger"	1999	—	*	—	—	—	—	—	—	—	—		Edyta Górniak
"Hunting High and Low"	2000	—	*	—	—	—	—	—	—	—	—		Edyta Górniak
"Pieśń Julii"	2000	—	*	—	—	—	—	—	—	—	—		Non-album singles
"To nie ja" (remix)	2000	—	*	—	—	—	—	—	—	—	—		Non-album singles
"Jak najdalej"	2001	7	*	—	—	—	—	—	—	—	—		Perła
"Nie proszę o więcej"	2002	22	*	—	—	—	—	—	—	—	—		Perła
"Słowa jak motyle"	2002	28	*	—	—	—	—	—	—	—	—		Perła
"Perła"	2002	—	*	—	—	—	—	—	—	—	—		Perła
"Impossible"	2002	7	*	50	—	63	52	—	55	—	64		Invisible
"As If / Sit Down"	2003	—	*	—	—	—	—	—	—	—	—		Invisible
"The Story So Far"	2003	—	*	—	—	18	—	—	—	—	—		Invisible
"Whatever It Takes"	2003	—	*	—	—	—	—	—	—	—	—		Invisible
"Make It Happen"	2003	—	*	—	—	—	—	—	—	—	—		Invisible
"Nieśmiertelni"	2003	—	*	—	—	—	—	—	—	—	—		Moja i Twoja muzyka
"Krople chwil..."	2004	—	*	—	—	—	—	—	—	—	—		Non-album single
"Loving You"	2006	—	*	—	—	—	—	—	—	—	—		EKG
"List"	2007	—	*	—	—	—	—	—	—	—	—		EKG
"Dziękuję Ci"	2008	—	*	—	—	—	—	—	—	—	—		EKG
"To nie tak jak myślisz"	2008	—	*	—	—	—	—	—	—	—	—		To nie tak, jak myślisz, kotku
"Mizerna cicha"	2008	—	*	—	—	—	—	—	—	—	—		Zakochaj się na Święta w kolędach
"Teraz – tu"	2011	— (Note: "Teraz – tu" did not enter the Polish Airplay Chart, but peaked at number 2 on the Polish Airplay New chart.)	*	—	—	—	—	—	—	—	—		My
"On the Run"	2011	—	*	—	—	—	—	—	—	—	—		My
"Oj... kotku"	2011	—	*	—	—	—	—	—	—	—	—		Pokaż, kotku, co masz w środku
"Nie zapomnij mnie"	2012	—	*	—	—	—	—	—	—	—	—		My
"Consequences"	2012	—	*	—	—	—	—	—	—	—	—		My
"Co tylko chcesz"	2012	—	*	—	—	—	—	—	—	—	—		Non-album single
"Sens-Is"	2013	—	*	—	—	—	—	—	—	—	—		My
"Your High"	2014	— (Note: "Your High" did not enter the Polish Airplay Chart, but peaked at number 3 on the Polish Airplay New chart.)	*	—	—	—	—	—	—	—	—		Non-album singles
"Glow On"	2014	— (Note: "Glow On" did not enter the Polish Airplay Chart, but peaked at number 3 on the Polish Airplay New chart.)	*	—	—	—	—	—	—	—	—		Non-album singles
"Oczyszczenie"	2015	—	*	—	—	—	—	—	—	—	—		Non-album singles
"Grateful"	2016	43	*	—	—	—	—	—	—	—	—		Non-album singles
"Andromeda" (with Don)	2017	26	*	—	—	—	—	—	—	—	—	ZPAV: Gold	Non-album singles
"Dom dobrych drzew"	2018	—	*	—	—	—	—	—	—	—	—		Leśniczówka
"Tylko Ty"	2018	—	*	—	—	—	—	—	—	—	—		Dywizjon 303. Historia prawdziwa
"Zatrzymać chwilę" (with Roksana Węgiel)	2018	—	*	—	—	—	—	—	—	—	—		Hotel Transylvania 3: Summer Vacation
"Król" (with Gromee)	2019	10	*	—	—	—	—	—	—	—	—	ZPAV: 2× Platinum	Non-album singles
"My Way"	2019	—	*	—	—	—	—	—	—	—	—		Non-album singles
"Lime (TeQuila-ila)"	2020	—	*	—	—	—	—	—	—	—	—		Non-album singles
"Too Late"	2020	—	*	—	—	—	—	—	—	—	—		Non-album singles
"Będę śniła" (re-edit)	2021	—	*	—	—	—	—	—	—	—	—		Non-album singles
"W Tobie jest światło"	2022	—	*	—	—	—	—	—	—	—	—		Non-album singles
"Free Your Heart" (with Tomek Torres)	2022	—	*	—	—	—	—	—	—	—	—		Non-album singles
"Jezus malusieńki"	2022	—	*	—	—	—	—	—	—	—	—		Non-album singles
"Have Yourself a Merry Little Christmas"	2022	—	*	—	—	—	—	—	—	—	—		Non-album singles
"I Remember"	2024	—	—	—	—	—	—	—	—	—	—		Non-album singles
"Jingle Bells"	2024	—	—	—	—	—	—	—	—	—	—		My Favourite Winter
"—" denotes items which were not released in that country or failed to chart. "*" denotes the chart did not exist at that time.

=== As featured artist ===
List of singles as featured artist, showing year released and album name
Title	Year	Album
"Embarras" (Irena Santor featuring Edyta Górniak)	1996	Duety
"Powrócisz tu" (Irena Santor featuring Edyta Górniak)	1996	Duety
"Nie było" (Sweet Noise featuring Edyta Górniak)	2004	Revolta
"Lunatique" (Mathplanete featuring Edyta Górniak)	2005	Mathplanete
"Sexuality" (Mathplanete featuring Edyta Górniak)	2006	Mathplanete
"Wystarczy chcieć" (various artists)	2006	Non-album single
"All the Way" (Matt Dusk featuring Edyta Górniak)	2013	My Funny Valentine: The Chet Baker Songbook
"Mów sercem" (Nerwus featuring Edyta Górniak)	2022	Non-album singles

== Music videos ==
List of music videos as lead artist, showing year released and director(s)
Title	Year	Director(s)
"To nie ja"	1994	Bolesław Pawica
"Once in a Lifetime"	1994	Kola Ilori
"Jestem kobietą"	1994	Gareth Roberts
"Dotyk"	1995	Nigel Askew
"Kolorowy wiatr"	1995	Bolesław Pawica
"To Atlanta"	1996	Unknown
"When You Come Back to Me"	1997	Tim MacMillan
"Hope for Us"	1997	Unknown
"Anything"	1998	Phil Griffin
"Lustro"	1998	Bolesław Pawica
"One & One"	1998	Unknown
"Dumka na dwa serca"	1999	Janusz Kołodrubiec
"Jak najdalej"	2001	Leszek Kumański
"Nie proszę o więcej"	2002	Bartek Jastrzębowski
"Impossible"	2003	Dominic Anciano
"Nie było"	2004	Michał Gazda, Piotr Mohamed
"Sexuality"	2006	Andrzej Artymowicz
"Wystarczy chcieć"	2006	Miroslaw Kuba Brozek
"List"	2007	Miroslaw Kuba Brozek
"To nie tak jak myślisz"	2008	Miroslaw Kuba Brozek
"Mizerna cicha"	2008	Dariusz Szermanowicz
"Teraz – tu"	2011	Edyta Górniak
"On the Run"	2011	Andrzej Szajewski
"Oj... kotku"	2011	Miroslaw Kuba Brozek
"Consequences"	2012	Alan Kępski, Edyta Górniak
"Co tylko chcesz"	2012	Maciej Domagalski
"Your High" (Day Version)	2014	Jacenty Karczmarczyk
"Your High" (Night Version)	2014	Jacenty Karczmarczyk
"Tylko Ty"	2018	Michał Braum
"Lime (TeQuila-ila)"	2020	Edyta Górniak Production, Marathon Films
"I Remember"	2024	Edyta Górniak, Anna Szczykutowicz
