= Live '99 =

Live album by Edyta Górniak
- Released: 1999
- Genre: Pop
- Label: Pomaton EMI

Edyta Górniak chronology
Edyta Gorniak (1997)	Live '99 (1999)	Perła (2002)

Live '99 is the first Live album by Polish singer Edyta Górniak. It was released in 1999.

== Background ==
The songs were recorded during Edyta Górniak's 1999 tour in Poland. The backing vocals were performed by Ania Szarmach and Kasia Cerekwicka and Krzysztof Pietrzak who are now also well-known singers in Poland.

== Track listing ==
1. Intro (1:36)
2. Perfect Moment (3:50)
3. When You Come Back to Me (4:58)
4. Dotyk (4:33)
5. The Day I Get Over You (8:19)
6. Stop! (5:05)
7. Jestem kobietą (4:16)
8. I Don't Know What's On Your Mind (5:03)
9. Miles & Miles Away (5:35)
10. Hunting High & Low (4:07)
11. To nie ja (4:22)
12. Anything (4:31)
13. Dziś prawdziwych cyganów już nie ma (3:27)
14. Gone (6:56)

== Promo singles ==
- Stop! (1999)
- Hunting High & Low (2000)
