= Mi Chico Latino =

1999 single by Geri Halliwell

Single by Geri Halliwell

from the album Schizophonic
- B-side: "G.A.Y"; "Summertime"
- Written: Late 1998
- Released: 16 August 1999
- Genre: Latin pop
- Length: 3:15
- Label: EMI
- Songwriters: Geri Halliwell; Andy Watkins; Paul Wilson
- Producer: Absolute

Geri Halliwell singles chronology
"Look at Me" (1999)	"Mi Chico Latino" (1999)	"Lift Me Up" (1999)

Music video
- "Mi Chico Latino" on YouTube

"Mi Chico Latino" (English: "My Latin Boy"), is a song by English singer Geri Halliwell for her debut solo album, Schizophonic (1999). It was written by Halliwell, Andy Watkins and Paul Wilson, whilst produced by the latter two, who are known collectively as Absolute. "Mi Chico Latino" was released as the album's second single on 16 August 1999 by EMI Records. It is a Latin pop song that is centred on a lost love theme. The song was written by Halliwell in order to pay homage to her mother, who has Spanish background, whilst it also has a number of Spanish lyrics.

"Mi Chico Latino" received mixed reviews from music critics, who noted it was a contribution to the Latin pop phenom at the time, while others criticised Halliwell's Spanish pronunciation. The song was a commercial success in the United Kingdom, debuting at number one on the UK Singles Chart, becoming Halliwell's first number-one solo single in the country. The song also attracted some moderate success worldwide. "Mi Chico Latino"'s accompanying music video was directed by Doug Nichol and filmed on the island of Sardinia. It depicts the singer wearing a black bikini and dancing with semi-nude male dancers on a boat. In order to promote the single, Halliwell performed the song on Top of the Pops and Party in the Park in 1999.

== Background and development ==
"Mi Chico Latino" was written by Halliwell, Andy Watkins and Paul Wilson in late 1998. The singer wanted to make a song with Spanish influences, in order to pay homage for her Spanish mother. During a day in the studio, they came up with a melody but did not have any words. Then she called her mother for help. Halliwell recalled asking her, "Mum, what do you say to a bloke in Spanish if you fancy him and are being romantic?" Her mother then said she did not remember that. So she asked her look at her library of Spanish language romances, and she read the titles out to Halliwell. Eventually she came out with "¿Dónde está el hombre con fuego en la sangre?" ("Where is the man with fire in his blood?" in English), and she liked the way it sounded and included the line at the beginning of the song. After "Look at Me" peaked at number two, her record company wanted her to release "Lift Me Up", while the Absolute team wanted "Bag It Up", but she chose to release "Mi Chico Latino" after receiving good reception from children. She also thought,

"First and foremost I thought it was a good record. It was poppy and catchy and perfect for the summer. I think my core audience is young teenage girls and gay guys. Both of those groups tend to like pure pop music and I think that's what 'Chico' was. It was very different from the slightly leftfield style of 'Look at Me'. [...] The other thing that 'Chico' had going for it was that the music was Latin-based, I had written the song back in 1998 but by the time the summer of 1999 came around Latin-influenced music was ruling the charts. Ricky Martin had recently had a number one and there were others on the way. So it was a strange example of synchronicity that I should be ready to go with a Latin track which I had written almost a year before".

== Composition ==
Mi Chico Latino
A 20-second sample of the song.

"Mi Chico Latino" is a Latin pop song that moves at a moderate tempo of 104 beats per minute. At the beginning of the song, Halliwell chants the spoken word line "¿Dónde está el hombre con fuego en la sangre?" (which translates to Where is the man with fire in the blood?). The lyrics to the song are centred on a lost love theme, with castanets in the background. During the song, the singer also sings in Italian on its chorus, when everything else is Spanish. According to biographer David Sinclair in his book Spice Girls Revisited: How The Spice Girls Reinvented Pop, Halliwell continued to explore the Riviera-pop theme of her former group's song, "Viva Forever", whilst "murmuring sweet nothings in a peculiar brand of estuary Spanish while castanets and timbales clattered alongside a cod-flamenco guitar".

=== Controversy ===
In 1999 Ishtar, the Israeli lead singer of Alabina, said "Mi Chico Latino" was plagiarised from her song "Alabina (De La Noche A La Manana)", released the year before. A spokesman for Alabina's French record label Atal said that they were "anxiously contacting" Halliwell's record label about the songs' similarities. However, no legal actions were made.

== Critical reception ==
"Mi Chico Latino" received mixed reviews from music critics. Jon Perks, whilst reviewing Schizophonic for Sunday Mercury, gave a positive review, stating, "Okay, so it sounds like a hybrid of La Vida Loca and Madonna's La Isla Bonita, but with a swimming-costumed Geri on the cover and a summery tune, it's a winning combination". Chris Charles from BBC News commented that "Mi Chico Latino" could be mistaken with "Spice Up Your Life", Halliwell's previous hit with the Spice Girls. The Daily Vault's Christopher Thelen felt that it "is an odd selection for a single". Jonathan O'Brien from Hot Press magazine was negative, stating that "Mi Chico Latino" was "a dreadful pastiche of Madonna's 'La Isla Bonita'". For Russell Baillie from The New Zealand Herald, Halliwell spends time on the album "flashing her eyelashes at [menfolk], especially if they're foreign", calling the song "glutinous". According to Rolling Stone, "Mi Chico Latino" was her "impeccably timed contribution to the Latin-pop phenom, complete with awkwardly pronounced Spanglish".

== Release and chart performance ==
"Mi Chico Latino" was released in the United Kingdom on 16 August 1999 as two CD singles and a cassette single. The song debuted at number one on the UK Singles Chart on 22 August 1999, selling 132,000 copies in its first week, becoming Halliwell's first number-one solo single in the country. It also was the beginning of a sequence of four consecutive Halliwell singles reaching number one in the United Kingdom. It spent fifteen weeks in the charts, and went on to sell over 400,000 copies in the UK and was certified gold by the British Phonographic Industry (BPI). "Mi Chico Latino" experienced moderate success in other European markets. In Austria, it entered the singles chart at number 34, eventually peaking at number 27 and spending a total of eight weeks on the chart. In France, the song peaked at number 40, remaining on the chart for ten weeks in total. On the Swiss Singles Chart dated 19 September 1999, it peaked at number 26. In Australia, "Mi Chico Latino" was released on 23 August 1999 and debuted at its peak of number 43 on the ARIA Singles Chart on the issue dated 5 September 1999. In the United States, the song was serviced to contemporary hit radio on 21 September 1999 and peaked at number 19 on Billboard's Dance Club Play chart.

== Music video ==
The accompanying music video for "Mi Chico Latino" was directed by Doug Nichol and filmed in Sardinia from 5–8 July 1999. Halliwell wanted the video for the song to be very different in style to her previous single "Look at Me", as that one was filmed in Prague in the freezing cold, and she wanted something to connect with her fans. According to her, the video was also pretty easy to get: "a yacht, a girl in a bikini and some wicked boy dancers to keep both sets of fans [gay guys and teenage girls] happy". After the video was released, the singer got a huge amount of attention from it. "People came up to me and told me how great and how sexy it was. They also told me I looked really healthy, but how wrong they were. I wasn't healthy because I wasn't eating properly and although I was slim at the time, that was a mirage too because the tough regime of the diet was always going to lead me to binge and put the weight back on", and later, she began taking recovery meetings for bulimia.

== Live performances ==
Halliwell first performed "Mi Chico Latino" as the opening number at her show held at G-A-Y nightclub. According to Brian Logan from The Guardian, the performance "served only to stress" her certain brand of pop, referring to it as "Madonna-lite." Halliwell also performed the single in front of 100,000 fans at Party in the Park event in early July 1999. On 26 August 1999, the singer performed the song on Top of the Pops. On 8 July 2001, whist promoting her second album Scream If You Wanna Go Faster, she performed the song again on Party in the Park.

== Formats and track listings ==
UK CD1 and European maxi-CD single

1. "Mi Chico Latino" – 3:16
2. "G.A.Y." – 3:22
3. "Summertime" – 3:35
4. "Mi Chico Latino" (Enhanced Video) – 3:10

UK CD2 single

1. "Mi Chico Latino" – 3:16
2. "Mi Chico Latino" (Junior Vasquez Main Pass Edit) – 6:00
3. "Mi Chico Latino" (Charlie Rapino and Merv de Peyer 12" Version) – 5:14
4. "Mi Chico Latino" (Claudio Coccoluto The Coco Club Mix) – 5:22

European CD single

1. "Mi Chico Latino" – 3:16
2. "G.A.Y." – 3:22
3. "Mi Chico Latino" (Enhanced Video) – 3:10

Australian maxi-CD single

1. "Mi Chico Latino" – 3:16
2. "G.A.Y." – 3:22
3. "Summertime" – 3:35

French CD single

1. "Mi Chico Latino" (JB Saudray Mix) – 3:28
2. "Mi Chico Latino" – 3:16
3. "Summertime" – 3:35

Italian 12-inch single

1. "Mi Chico Latino" – 3:16
2. "Mi Chico Latino" (The Coco Club – Claudio Coccoluto) – 5:22
3. "Mi Chico Latino" (The DubDuo Dub – Claudio Coccoluto) – 7:24

== Personnel ==
Personnel are adapted from Schizophonic album liner notes.

- Geri Halliwell – songwriting
- Absolute – songwriting, production, instruments
- Tracey Ackerman – backing vocals
- Milton Mcdonald – guitar
- Karlos Edwards – percussion
- Mike Higham – programming
- Paul "P" Dub Walton – audio engineering
- Mark "Spike" Stent – mixing
- Wayne Wilkins – mixing assistance
- Stylorouge – design, art direction
- Dean Freeman – photography

== Charts ==
=== Weekly charts ===
Weekly chart performance for "Mi Chico Latino"
Chart (1999)	Peak position
Australia (ARIA)	43
Austria (Ö3 Austria Top 40)	27
Belgium (Ultratip Bubbling Under Flanders)	2
Belgium (Ultratop 50 Wallonia)	25
Czech Republic (IFPI)	16
Estonia (Eesti Top 20)	6
Europe (Eurochart Hot 100)	7
Finland (Suomen virallinen lista)	6
France (SNEP)	40
Germany (GfK)	28
Greece (IFPI)	10
Iceland (Íslenski Listinn Topp 40)	24
Ireland (IRMA)	9
Italy (Musica e dischi)	3
Italy Airplay (Music & Media)	2
Netherlands (Dutch Top 40)	16
Netherlands (Single Top 100)	27
Scottish Singles Sales (Official Charts)	1
Spain (Promusicae)	7
Sweden (Sverigetopplistan)	29
Switzerland (Schweizer Hitparade)	26
UK Singles (Official Charts)	1
US Dance Club Songs (Billboard)	19

=== Year-end charts ===
Year-end chart performance for "Mi Chico Latino"
Chart (1999)	Position
Europe (Eurochart Hot 100)	89
Romania (Romanian Top 100)	80
UK Singles (OCC)	42

== Certifications ==
Certifications and sales for "Mi Chico Latino"
Region	Certification	Certified units/sales
United Kingdom (BPI)	Gold	391,500

== Bibliography ==
- Kutner, Jon (2005). 1000 UK Number One Hits. Omnibus Press. ISBN 1844492834.
- Halliwell, Geri (2003). Just For the Record. Ebury Press. ISBN 0091888042.
- Sinclair, David (2007). Spice Girls Revisited: How the Spice Girls Reinvented Pop Fame. Omnibus Press. ISBN 978-1846090684.
