= Lift Me Up (Geri Halliwell song) =

1999 single by Geri Halliwell

Single by Geri Halliwell

from the album Schizophonic
- B-side: "Live and Let Die"; "Very Slowly"
- Released: 1 November 1999
- Genre: Pop
- Length: 3:53
- Label: EMI
- Songwriters: Geri Halliwell; Paul Wilson; Andy Watkins; Tracy Ackerman
- Producer: Absolute

Geri Halliwell singles chronology
"Mi Chico Latino" (1999)	"Lift Me Up" (1999)	"Bag It Up" (2000)

Music video
- "Lift Me Up" on YouTube

"Lift Me Up" is a song by English singer Geri Halliwell for her debut solo album, Schizophonic (1999). It was written by Halliwell, Andy Watkins and Paul Wilson, whilst produced by the latter two, who are known collectively as Absolute. "Lift Me Up" was released as the album's third single on 1 November 1999 by EMI Records. It debuted at number one on the UK Singles Chart, winning the chart battle against fellow Spice Girls member Emma Bunton's "What I Am" by 30,000 copies. To promote the single, Halliwell performed the song on Top of the Pops, Pepsi Chart, Musica Si and National Lottery.

== Critical reception ==
The Daily Vault's Christopher Thelen stated that tracks like "Lift Me Up" "make it clearly known to the listener that Halliwell is serious about this career move, and that she has the talent and the pipes to deliver the goods." Dotmusic's Andy Strickland said, "Geri takes a deep breath and delivers a smokers' octave, husky drawl that is pleasant, nice, lovely - all those words they hate you using in English lessons at school". David Stubbs from NME described it as an "astoundingly nondescript pop song".

== Chart performance ==
During the song's release week, it faced strong competition with Tin Tin Out's collaboration with previous Spice Girls group mate Emma Bunton's debut, "What I Am". Halliwell criticised record company executives for allegedly exploiting fans by encouraging the head-to-head race. "Lift Me Up" ultimately reached number one in the UK Singles Chart on 13 November 1999, selling 140,000 copies in its first week, 30,000 more copies than "What I Am". Its total sales are 346,000 copies in the United Kingdom, and the single enjoyed a fifteen-week run in the UK chart.

== Music video ==
The music video for "Lift Me Up" was directed by Howard Greenhalgh and filmed in October 1999 in Málaga. The beautiful twilight shots of Geri driving through the sprawling Malaga countryside create a mood that perfectly complements the whimsical string-synth melody snaking through the song. The plot involves Geri happening across a posse of aliens who are trying to repair their ship by befriending. Before helping them on their way, she takes them to the car wash for a water fight and back to a motel room to show them the latest music videos from herself (including "Mi Chico Latino"). Geri drives to the store then the aliens steal cash from the cash register and they went out, a police car with a police officer was seen chasing after them but they disappear. At night, Geri bade farewell to the aliens before returning to their home in outer space. Up in the sky, the spaceship is gone leaving her name's signature at the bottom end as their remembrance.

== Track listings ==
- UK CD1, European and Australian CD single
1. "Lift Me Up" – 3:50
2. "Lift Me Up" (Metro edit) – 3:57
3. "Lift Me Up" (Almighty edit) – 3:24
4. "Lift Me Up" (K-Klass Phazerphunk mix) – 8:02
- UK CD2
1. "Lift Me Up" – 3:50
2. "Live and Let Die" – 3:10
3. "Very Slowly" – 3:59
4. "Lift Me Up" (video)
- UK cassette single
1. "Lift Me Up" – 3:50
2. "Live and Let Die" – 3:10
3. "Very Slowly" – 3:59
- Italian 12-inch single
1. "Lift Me Up" (K-Klass Phazerphunk mix) – 8:17
2. "Lift Me Up" (Sharp Deadly dub) – 6:58
3. "Lift Me Up" (Sharp Sonik vocal mix) – 7:43
4. "Lift Me Up" (album version) – 3:50

== Charts ==
=== Weekly charts ===
Chart (1999–2000)	Peak position
Australia (ARIA)	75
Belgium (Ultratip Bubbling Under Wallonia)	6
Czech Republic (IFPI)	5
Estonia (Eesti Top 20)	15
Europe (Eurochart Hot 100)	11
Finland (Suomen virallinen lista)	20
Germany (GfK)	77
Iceland (Íslenski Listinn Topp 40)	31
Ireland (IRMA)	15
Netherlands (Single Top 100)	71
New Zealand (Recorded Music NZ)	23
Scotland Singles (OCC)	4
Sweden (Sverigetopplistan)	56
UK Singles (OCC)	1

=== Year-end charts ===
Chart (1999)	Position
UK Singles (OCC)	57

== Certifications ==
Region	Certification	Certified units/sales
United Kingdom (BPI)	Silver	346,000

== Release history ==
Region	Date	Format(s)	Label(s)	Ref.
United Kingdom	1 November 1999	CD; cassette	EMI	
New Zealand	25 November 1999	CD	EMI	
Australia	14 February 2000	CD	EMI	
