= When You Come Back to Me =

When You Come Back to Me may refer to:

- When You Come Back to Me (film), a 1953 drama film
- "When You Come Back to Me" (Edyta Górniak song), 1997
- "When You Come Back to Me" (Jason Donovan song), 1989
- "When You Come Back to Me", a 1950 song by the Clovers
- "When You Come Back to Me", a song by World Party from the soundtrack to the 1994 film Reality Bites
