= Impossible (Edyta Górniak song) =

Single by Edyta

from the album Invisible
- Released: February 3, 2003
- Recorded: 2002
- Genre: Pop
- Label: Virgin Music (EMI Music Germany)
- Songwriters: Andy Watkins, Paul Wilson, Tracy Ackerman
- Producer: Absolute

Edyta Górniak singles chronology
"One & One" (1999)	"Impossible" (2003)	"Lunatique" (2005)

"Impossible" is a 2003 single by Edyta Górniak (credited as Edyta) from the album Invisible.

== Background ==
The single was released in Poland, Germany, Austria and Switzerland.

"Impossible" is the first single from the album Invisible and the last after the scheduled release of the second single "The Story So Far" was cancelled.

== Chart performance ==
On February 2, 2003, "Impossible" debuted at number fifty-eight on the German Singles Chart, becoming Edyta's highest debut on the German Single Chart to date and her second entry in the German Chart after "One & One".

The song also debuted at number sixty-six in Austria on February 16, 2003, rising to number fifty, and at number sixty-four in Switzerland on March 2, 2003.

"Impossible" reached number thirty-five on Lista Przebojów Trójki of the public radio station Polskie Radio 3, the most popular unofficial Polish Singles Chart.

== Live performances ==
Edyta performed "Impossible" in 2003 on the German edition of Top of the Pops on RTL, at the SWR3 Rheinland-Pfalz Open-Air in Mainz and at the Polish national selection for the Eurovision Song Contest as a show act.

== Track listings ==
Single

1. "Impossible" (single version)
2. "Impossible" (Paradise City club mix)

Maxi-single

1. "Impossible" (single version) (4:15)
2. "Impossible" (Paradise City club mix) (6:54)
3. "Impossible" (Roy Malone King mix - edit) (3:34)
4. "Sleep with Me" (album version) (3:07)

Vinyl

A-side

1. "Impossible" (Paradise City club mix)
2. "Impossible" (Milk & Sugar dub mix)

B-side

1. "Impossible" (Roy Malone King mix)
2. "Impossible" (Kelly Pitiuso dub mix)

== Music video ==
At the beginning of the music video Edyta walks in white clothes through a dark hallway which is only illuminated by blinking lights and then she starts to dance, then she is sitting in black clothes on a white chair in front of a white background.

In the next scenes she dances in front of a white background alone or together with some guys, then also in front of the dark room with the blinking lights. Between this scenes Edyta is spinning also in the white chair.

In another scene Edyta is lying in the midst of colour changing LED-based lights. The video ends with a close-up view of Edyta singing into a microphone.

== Credits and personnel ==
- Text and music: Watkins, Wilson, Ackerman
- Producer: Absolute
- Mixed by: Jeremy Wheatley
- Photo: T. Drzewiński
- Recording company: Virgin Music (EMI Music Germany GmbH & Co. KG)
- Published by: 19 Entertainment, BMG Music, Chrysalis Music

== Charts ==
Chart	Peak Position
Austria (Ö3 Austria Top 40)	50
Czech Republic (IFPI)	63
Europe (European Hot 100 Singles)	52
Germany (Official German Charts)	55
Germany (Music & Media)	10
Poland (Polish Airplay Charts)	7
Poland Airplay (Music & Media)	1
Switzerland (Schweizer Hitparade)	64
