= Schizophonic (Geri Halliwell album) =

1999 album by Geri Halliwell

- White cover

Studio album by Geri Halliwell
- Released: 7 June 1999
- Recorded: 1998
- Studio: Olympic (London)
- Genres: Pop; dance-pop
- Length: 40:52
- Labels: EMI; Capitol
- Producer: Absolute

Geri Halliwell chronology
Schizophonic (1999)	Scream If You Wanna Go Faster (2001)

Singles from Schizophonic
- 1. "Look at Me" Released: 10 May 1999; 2. "Mi Chico Latino" Released: 16 August 1999; 3. "Lift Me Up" Released: 1 November 1999; 4. "Bag It Up" Released: 13 March 2000

Alternate cover
- Red cover

Schizophonic is the debut solo studio album by British pop singer Geri Halliwell. The album was released in June 1999, after her 1998 split from popular girl group the Spice Girls. The term schizophonic is a portmanteau of the Greek words schizo ("split", "divide") and phonic ("sound"), and also seemingly a play on the word "schizophrenic" and the musical term "schizophonia". This was the first solo album released by a Spice Girl.

It produced four singles, all of which saw commercial success in the UK—"Mi Chico Latino", "Lift Me Up" and "Bag It Up" reached number one, while the first single "Look at Me" peaked at number two. As of 2001, the album has sold more than two million copies worldwide.

== Background ==
"Everything I've done I've always done passionately, with all my heart and my soul. I didn't want to leave the Spice Girls and immediately have a record out on the back of that. That's why I've waited. I wanted to find out who I am, weigh up what I wanted to project, and get a structure, a game-plan to it all."

— Halliwell on the time gap between her leaving the Spice Girls and releasing her debut solo album.

On 31 May 1998, it was announced that Halliwell had left girl group Spice Girls, with the singer claiming that she was suffering from exhaustion and wanted to take a break. However, rumours of a feud with fellow member Melanie Brown as the reason for her departure were circulated by the press. Halliwell's departure from the group became one of the biggest entertainment news stories of the year, making news headlines the world over. The four remaining members were adamant that the group would carry on, and continued their Spiceworld Tour without her in the summer of 1998. In 2007, she stated on BBC One documentary Giving You Everything that she had "given all I could" and felt like she "didn't belong anymore. They didn't need me anymore, really, and I definitely felt very redundant."

As a solo artist, Halliwell signed a three-album deal with EMI worth US$3 million, influenced by Robbie Williams' solo success after leaving Take That. She began developing her debut solo album, and recruited the Absolute production duo, Paul Watson and Andy Watkins, who had produced songs for the Spice Girls. The remaining members of the group became aware of Halliwell's new project and asked the duo to choose between her and them; the duo opted to work with Halliwell. The next year, she launched her solo career and released her debut album titled Schizophonic, which she described as "a cross between Julie Andrews and Johnny Rotten".

== Album covers ==
Schizophonic was released with two different covers, representing an angel (white), and a devil (red); both covers are the same edition of the album. On the first "O" on Schizophonic, there is an angel halo on the white cover and horns on the red cover. On the back cover, the song titles are written in both red and white, relating the theme of the song to one of the personalities. The booklet of the album features both covers on all editions, and the lyrics of the songs are included on the side that they are marked on the back cover.

== Promotion ==
The album's release was promoted with a documentary, Geri, which was directed by Molly Dineen and screened by Channel 4 on 5 May 1999, following Halliwell's life after her departure from the Spice Girls. In 2005, Halliwell admitted that "With hindsight, it was a mistake, but I was very out of sorts, I was lonely and I felt starved of friendship and intellectual company, which Molly gave me because she is so totally intellectual." While she does not regret doing the documentary, she found it "far too upsetting a prospect to even consider watching it again".

== Singles ==
Three of the four singles from the album went to number one in the United Kingdom, while the debut single made number two. The lead single was "Look at Me", produced by Absolute and Phil Bucknall. It was released in the United Kingdom on 10 May 1999, the same week as Boyzone's "You Needed Me". In early 1999, Boyzone was at the height of its own success with five UK number-ones, however, Halliwell was confident that "Look at Me" would reach number one. Though more transactions were made of the "Look at Me" single, two CD singles of "You Needed Me" were released in order for fans to purchase both and ensure that Boyzone made it to the number-one position. "Look at Me" entered the UK Singles Chart at number two, selling 140,000 copies in its first week; it was only 700 copies behind "You Needed Me". Halliwell was disappointed with the outcome of the chart performance for "Look at Me", since she had believed that it would reach number one. She had also feared that her career would be ruined six months after the release of the single. However, Halliwell would earn her first UK number-one single with "Mi Chico Latino". "Look at Me" went on to sell 330,812 copies in the United Kingdom alone, being certified Gold by the BPI, and more than 1.5 million copies worldwide.

"Mi Chico Latino" debuted at number one on the UK Singles Chart on 22 August 1999, selling 132,000 copies in its first week, becoming Halliwell's first number-one solo single in the country. It also was the beginning of a sequence of four consecutive Halliwell singles reaching number one in the United Kingdom. It spent fifteen weeks in the charts, and went on to sell almost 383,000 copies in the UK and was certified Silver by the British Phonographic Industry (BPI). "Mi Chico Latino" experienced moderate success in other European markets. In Austria, it entered the singles chart at number 34, eventually peaking at number 27 and spending a total of eight weeks on the chart. In France, the song peaked at number 40, remaining on the chart for ten weeks in total. On the Swiss Singles Chart dated 19 September 1999, it peaked at number 26. In Australia, "Mi Chico Latino" debuted at its peak of number 43 on the issue dated 5 September 1999. The song also experienced success in the United States, peaking at number 19 on Billboard's Hot Dance Club Songs chart.

"Lift Me Up" was the third single from the album and the second single which ultimately reached number one on the UK Singles Chart on 13 November 1999, selling 140,000 copies in its first week, 30,000 more copies than "What I Am". Its total sales are 346,000 copies in the United Kingdom, and the single enjoyed a fifteen-week run in the UK chart. The music video for "Lift Me Up" was directed by Howard Greenhalgh and filmed in October 1999 in Málaga, Spain.

"Bag It Up" was the final single from the album and was sold 106,000 copies in its first week, becoming Halliwell's third consecutive solo number one on the UK Singles Chart. It has sold more than 260,000 copies and been certified Silver by the British Phonographic Industry. The music video to "Bag It Up" was filmed in January 2000 and was directed by Dawn Shadforth.

== Critical reception ==
Professional ratings
Review scores
Source	Rating
AllMusic	4/5 stars
Robert Christgau	(dud)
Dotmusic	9/10
Entertainment Weekly	C
Jam!	2.5/5 stars
The New Zealand Herald	2/5 stars
NME	4/10
Rolling Stone	3/5 stars
Toronto Sun	3/5 stars

Schizophonic received generally mixed reviews from music critics. In his review for The Independent, Nicholas Barber declared Schizophonic "considerably more sophisticated and more obviously packed with hits than either of the Spice Girls' albums." People called the album "flip, fun froth from a former Spice." The magazine wrote that "the self-worth, Girl Power sloganeering of her old group is replaced here by Halliwell's plucky, self-deprecating statement of Geri-empowerment [...] Except for a few oversweetened ballads and two ill-advised forays into foreign (Latin and Indian) genres, Solo Girl comports herself well indeed." Karen Schoemer from Rolling Stone remarked that Schizophonic "is more Girl Chutzpah than Girl Power. Geri seems intent on being all spices: sweet, salty, flirty, bossy [...] Geri's voice is flat and unsyncopated – she puts syllables in the darnedest places between the beat – but it has a surprising, undeniable charm. She's like a really enthusiastic impersonator, so anxious to win you over that you give in. Schizophonic doesn't reveal any hidden talents."

AllMusic editor Stephen Thomas Erlewine felt that "unfortunately, Halliwell doesn't have strong collaborators, who know how to exploit her admittedly limited voice, so much of it falls a little flat musically." He felt that the album's most successful tracks were its upbeat ones, which "sparkle with a gleeful, unabashed love of pop and dance." Erlewine concluded that the album "doesn't work on some levels, [but] it does succeed as a statement of purpose from the newly independent Halliwell." Chris Charles, writing for BBC News, found that Schizophonic "sees Geri adopt – or attempt to adopt – so many alter-egos that it is difficult to pin-point which is the real her [...] This mixing and matching is Geri all over. One minute she's popping out of a skimpy Union jack number, the next she's the prissie librarian figure clutching her pampered pooch." NME wrote that "Schizo-phonic, breaking every seduction rule of women's magazines, is an act of pure desperation. Count the signs: the 60-piece orchestra; the Latino number; the plucky showstopper, the maudlin ballad. It's clichid like a river of tears running past, yes, a mountain so high, yet when you're trying to be all things to all people, that's inevitable."

== Commercial performance ==
In the United Kingdom, Schizophonic debuted at number four on the UK Albums Chart, with sales of 35,000 copies. It sold 483,853 in total, being certified two-times Platinum by the British Phonographic Industry (BPI) for shipments of 600,000 copies. In Canada, the album debuted and peaked at number 15. With strong long-term sales the album was certified Platinum with slightly more than 100,000 copies shipped. In the United States, the album faced moderate success, selling 40,000 copies in its first week debuting and peaking at number 42 on the Billboard 200, the strongest Spice Girls solo showing on the chart. It shipped 500,000 copies and received a Gold certification in the country by the Recording Industry Association of America (RIAA). According to Nielsen SoundScan, Schizophonic has sold 181,000 copies there as of July 2007. The album was also certified Gold in Australia and Spain with shipments of more than 35,000 and 50,000 copies, respectively. However, the album only reached number 85 in Japan, selling 3,190 copies. By August of the same year of release, more than 1.3 million copies had been distributed through stores; by 2001, more than two million copies had been sold worldwide.

== Track listing ==
All tracks are written by Geri Halliwell, Andy Watkins and Paul Wilson, except where noted.

Schizophonic track listing
No.	Title	Writer(s)	Length
1.	"Look at Me"		4:31
2.	"Lift Me Up"	Halliwell, Watkins, Wilson, Tracy Ackerman	3:52
3.	"Walkaway"	Halliwell, Watkins, Wilson, Ackerman	5:03
4.	"Mi Chico Latino"		3:16
5.	"Goodnight Kiss"		4:38
6.	"Bag It Up"		3:46
7.	"Sometime"		4:01
8.	"Let Me Love You"		3:45
9.	"Someone's Watching Over Me"	Halliwell, Watkins, Wilson, Ackerman	4:15
10.	"You're in a Bubble"		3:27
Total length:			40:52

== Personnel ==
- Geri Halliwell – vocals
- Absolute – all instruments
- Mike Higham – additional programming
- Milton McDonald – guitars
- Phil Hudson – guitars (2)
- Dhiren Raichura – electric sitar
- Karlos Edwards – percussion
- Nick Ingman – string arrangements and conductor
- Gavyn Wright – string leader
- Tracy Ackerman – backing vocals
- Helen "Pepsi" DeMacque – backing vocals
- Shirlie Holliman – backing vocals
- Anna Ross – backing vocals
- Andy Watkins – backing vocals
- Paul Wilson – backing vocals
- Jenny O'Grady – soprano vocals
- Shama Shah – additional vocals

The Kick Horns (horns and horn arrangements)

- Simon Clarke – alto saxophone, baritone saxophone
- Tim Sanders – tenor saxophone
- Richard Edwards – bass trombone, trombone
- Annie Whitehead – trombone
- Roddy Lorimer – trumpet, flugelhorn
- Paul Spong – trumpet

Production

- Absolute – producers
- Paul 'P-Dub' Walton – engineer
- Spike Stent – mixing (1–4, 6)
- Steve Fitzmaurice – mixing (5, 7–10)
- Tim Young – mastering at Metropolis Mastering (London, UK)
- Nick Knight – photography
- Stylorouge – art direction, design

== Charts ==
=== Weekly charts ===
Weekly chart performance for Schizophonic
Chart (1999)	Peak position
Australian Albums (ARIA)	22
Austrian Albums (Ö3 Austria)	30
Belgian Albums (Ultratop Flanders)	39
Belgian Albums (Ultratop Wallonia)	35
Canadian Albums (Billboard)	15
Canada Top Albums/CDs (RPM)	11
Dutch Albums (Album Top 100)	85
European Albums (Music & Media)	10
Finnish Albums (Suomen virallinen lista)	11
French Albums (SNEP)	50
German Albums (Offizielle Top 100)	52
Greek Albums (IFPI)	8
Hungarian Albums (MAHASZ)	15
Irish Albums (IRMA)	63
Italian Albums (FIMI)	17
Japanese Albums (Oricon)	85
New Zealand Albums (RMNZ)	19
Norwegian Albums (VG-lista)	12
Scottish Albums (Official Charts)	13
Spanish Albums (Promusicae)	23
Swedish Albums (Sverigetopplistan)	43
Swiss Albums (Schweizer Hitparade)	31
UK Albums (Official Charts)	4
US Billboard 200	42

=== Year-end charts ===
Year-end chart performance for Schizophonic
Chart (1999)	Position
Australian Albums (ARIA)	99
UK Albums (OCC)	39

== Certifications and sales ==
Certifications and sales for Schizophonic
Region	Certification	Certified units/sales
Australia (ARIA)	Gold	35,000^{^}
Canada (Music Canada)	Platinum	100,000^{^}
France (SNEP)	Gold	100,000^{*}
Italy	—	100,000
Spain (Promusicae)	Gold	50,000^{^}
United Kingdom (BPI)	2× Platinum	600,000^{^}
United States (RIAA)	Gold	500,000^{^}
Summaries
Worldwide	—	2,000,000
^{*} Sales figures based on certification alone.^{^} Shipments figures based on certification alone.
