= Look at Me (Geri Halliwell song) =

1999 single by Geri Halliwell

Single by Geri Halliwell

from the album Schizophonic
- Released: 10 May 1999
- Genre: Pop; jazz
- Length: 4:31 (album version); 4:08 (single version)
- Label: EMI
- Songwriters: Geri Halliwell; Andy Watkins; Paul Wilson
- Producer: Absolute

Geri Halliwell singles chronology
"Look at Me" (1999)	"Mi Chico Latino" (1999)

Music video
- "Look at Me" on YouTube

"Look at Me" is a song by British singer Geri Halliwell from her debut solo studio album, Schizophonic (1999). It was written by Halliwell in collaboration with Andy Watkins and Paul Wilson, members of the Absolute production duo, who also produced the track. EMI Records released the song as Halliwell's debut solo single on 10 May 1999 in the United Kingdom, serving as the lead single from Schizophonic. Musically, "Look at Me" is a jazz-pop song featuring a nine-piece brass section, while the autobiographical lyrics depict Halliwell demanding the attention of everyone around her.

"Look at Me" received mixed reviews from music critics, with some finding similarities to Shirley Bassey's work. Commercially, it was successful; in the United Kingdom, the single debuted at number two on the UK Singles Chart behind Boyzone's "You Needed Me", by a difference of 700 copies. It was later certified Gold by the British Phonographic Industry (BPI) for shipments of 400,000 copies. Across the world, it peaked inside the top ten in countries such as Australia, Finland, Italy and Spain, while topping the charts in New Zealand.

An accompanying music video was directed by Vaughan Arnell and filmed in Prague and London; it premiered on Top of the Pops and features four versions of Halliwell: a vamp, a bitch, a virgin, and a sister. The visual also depicts the funeral of the singer's former "Ginger Spice" stage persona. "Look at Me" was promoted during a short promotional tour that visited a number of cities worldwide, as well as through televised live performances on Party in the Park and MTV Ibiza 2000 Festival. In 2012, it was featured in the jukebox musical Viva Forever!.

== Background and release ==
In 1998, Halliwell left the girl group Spice Girls, claiming differences between herself and others in the group. She would later admit to having problems with an eating disorder and depression. Additionally, rumours that she had had enough of fellow member Melanie Brown's criticisms of her, and that this was the reason for her departure, were circulated by the press. Her departure from the group became one of the biggest entertainment news stories of the year, making headlines the world over. Halliwell then signed a three-album deal with EMI worth US$3 million, influenced by Robbie Williams' solo success after leaving Take That. Soon, she started developing her debut solo album, recruiting the Absolute production duo, Paul Watson and Andy Watkins, who had produced songs for the Spice Girls. The remaining members of the group became aware of Halliwell's new project and asked the duo to choose between her and them. Wilson said,

"We were given a weekend to make up our minds. We chose Geri because, one: we didn't want to be put in that position by anybody, and two: Geri for us was the catalyst. We'd made a lot of money from the Spice Girls and we'd reached a point where we could make our choice for artistic reasons, and we just thought it was more exciting to do Geri. We were both totally sure that working with Geri was the right thing to do".

Among the tracks written for the album, titled Schizophonic, Halliwell chose "Look at Me" as the lead single. She thought the selection was a good idea to return with a song that people would either love or hate but could not be indifferent to, and felt that it was "in your face and full of attitude and that seemed like the right message to send". "Look at Me" was first played on BBC Radio 1's Radio 1 Breakfast on 16 April 1999, followed by a commercial release on 10 May in the United Kingdom, and a day later in Canada. In the United States, it was sent to radio stations on 17 May 1999 by Capitol Records. A month later, on 16 June, EMI issued a CD single in Japan. To promote the single's release, Halliwell embarked on a short promotional tour, visiting cities such as Rio de Janeiro, New York, Tokyo, Sydney and Milan. Additionally, she promoted "Look at Me" through televised live performances on Party in the Park, and MTV Ibiza 2000 Festival. In 2012, it was selected as one of two solo songs from the Spice Girls members to be featured in the jukebox musical Viva Forever! in its entirety; producer Judy Craymer said it was a "very diva-like song and perfect for the hard world of television and its judges who we portray as the gods on Mount Olympus".

== Composition ==
"Look at Me" was written by Halliwell in collaboration with Watkins and Wilson, members of the Absolute production duo, who also produced the track. It was programmed by Mike Higham and mixed by Mark "Spike" Stent, while being mastered by Tim Young at Metropolis Studios in London. The song is set in common time with a moderately fast dance groove tempo and a metronome of 144 beats per minute. Composed in the key of A minor, Halliwell's vocal range spans from G#_{3} to C_{5}. Musically, "Look at Me" is a jazz-pop song, which features a nine-piece brass section. Brian Hiatt from MTV News also noted a "heavy, Latin-tinged beat that lends the song a slight resemblance" to "Livin' la Vida Loca" (1999) by Ricky Martin. It also features an "operatic" middle eight, in which Halliwell "attempts a full diva-style vocal". BBC News' Chris Charles opinioned the track has shades of "The Lady Is a Vamp", a track present on the Spice Girls' album Spiceworld (1997). According to Chuck Taylor from Billboard, it was "tinged with everything from James Bond thematics and vaudeville to Britpop and Nancy Sinatra's 'These Boots Are Made For Walking'". Some reviewers also compared it to the Propellerheads and Shirley Bassey's "History Repeating" (1997). Halliwell defined the musical composition for the song as "a cross between Julie Andrews and Johnny Rotten".

According to Halliwell, the lyrics to "Look at Me" were "intentionally autobiographical", depicting herself as a "mercurial temptress who commands the attention of all those around her". On it, she sings, "Look at me, you can take it all/ Because this face is free/ Maybe next time use your eyes and/ Look at me, I'm a drama queen if that's your thing, baby/ I can even do reality". According to David Sinclair in the book Spice Girls Revisited: How The Spice Girls Reinvented Pop, the lyrics "gave an intriguing insight into Geri's inner world". He also noted that the "fast-talking, brass-necked, attention-seeking façade" included a sense of self-doubt with the lyrics "Sometimes I don't recognise my own face/ I look inside my eyes and find disgrace/ My little white lies tell a story/ I see it all, it has no glory". NME felt that the track was attempting to "create a self-reflexive conundrum, the knowingly blank canvas, the irony-chip Idoru". Halliwell admitted that she intended to convey that "we shouldn't take each other on just face value. We can be anything. We can be all of these people".

== Critical reception ==
"Look at Me" received mixed reviews from music critics. Stephen Thomas Erlewine, senior editor for AllMusic, deemed it "upbeat", "self-conscious", and "silly". People staff called the song an "irresistible opening track" for Schizophonic. Chris Charles of BBC News described it as "undeniably catchy", comparing Halliwell's performance to Shirley Bassey as "the queen of the scene flanked by a posse of subservient men". Birmingham Evening Mail staff commented, "Ginger puts the Spices well and truly behind her with a song that will probably appeal to adults as well as, if not more than, the teenie market. It's a more mature, fifties-style belter in which Geri reveals different facets of her character." Lou Carlozo from the Chicago Tribune felt that "Spice Girls fans should like the single", because the song had a "bouncy pop feel, but a more polished sound than the typical Spice Girls song". In a retrospective analysis, Sarah Dobbs of Digital Spy wrote that the track "remains one of her best; a kooky piece of drag-pop that perfectly encapsulates her bonkers character as well as her knack for a massive chorus."

Sarah Davis from Dotmusic wrote that "Look at Me" was a "well-crafted homage to a glamorous era [that] is destined to be huge", despite "some eyebrows being raised by the middle section". Billboard's Jon O'Brien said it "immediately quashed any doubts that the Spice Girl with the weakest vocal chops would struggle to make it on her own", as she "got the exact reaction she was hoping for in the song’s title". According to Larry Flick from the same publication, although the song was an "eccentric, over-the-top track", he wrote, "do not expect this record to garner approval from listeners – or even from programmers – without a number of spins to let the room get used" to it. Sam Brooks of The Spinoff described the track as "nice", saying it was "too long, but the beat holds up". Russell Baillie of The New Zealand Herald commented that "Look at Me" was one of the album's "knock-offs" at their cheapest, as well as a "toner-free photocopy of the Propellerheads-with-Shirley Bassey track History Repeating". J.D. Considine from The Baltimore Sun felt it was "utterly unconvincing – in large part because Halliwell's voice barely stands out from the cushion of harmony vocals supporting her." David Browne of Entertainment Weekly panned "Look at Me" as a "forced-showstopper single".

== Commercial performance ==
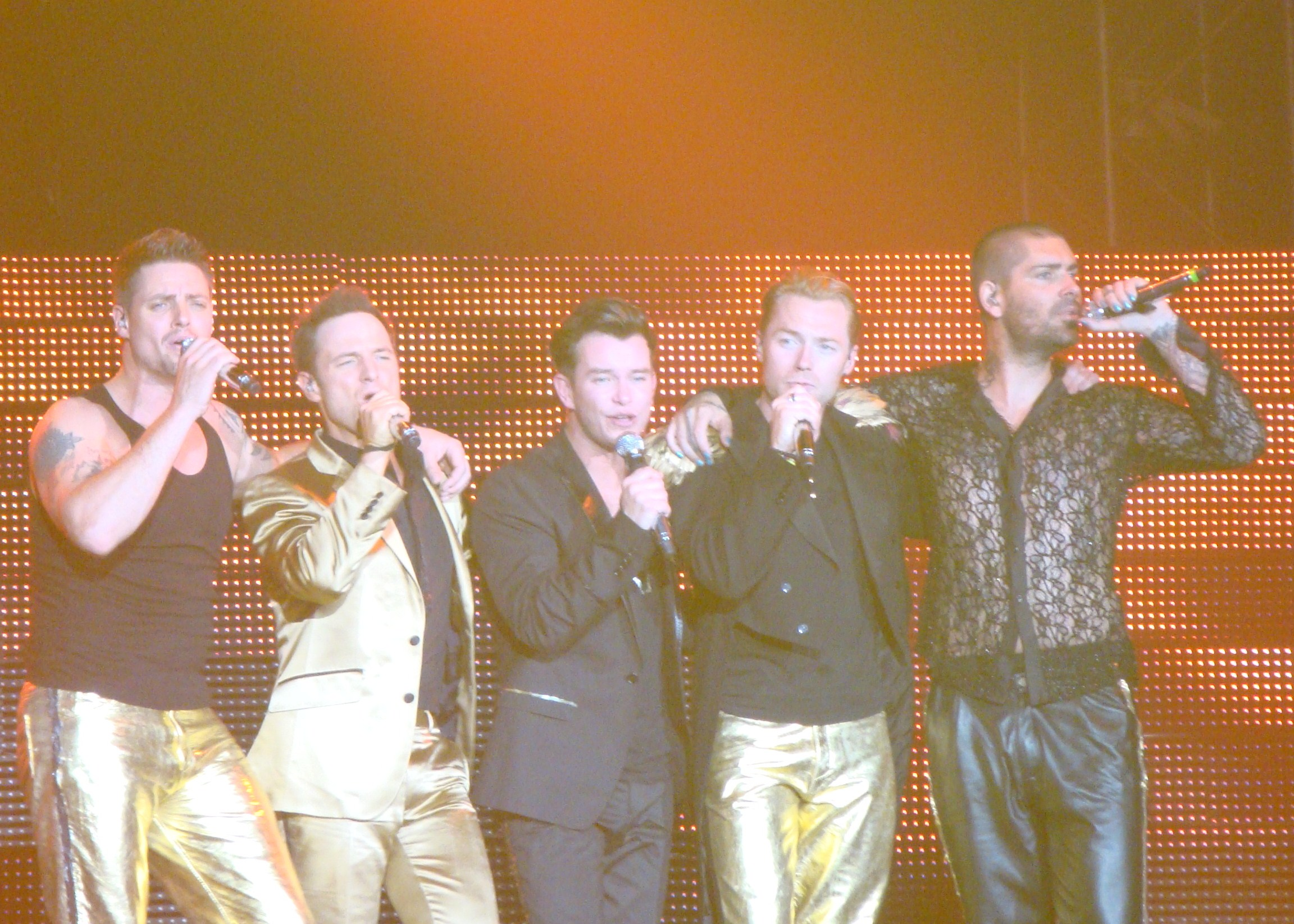
In the United Kingdom, Boyzone's (pictured) "You Needed Me" prevented "Look at Me" from reaching number one

"Look at Me" was released the same week as Boyzone's "You Needed Me" in the United Kingdom. Though more transactions were made of Halliwell's single, two CD singles of "You Needed Me" were released in order for fans to purchase both and ensure that Boyzone made it to the number-one position. "Look at Me" entered the UK Singles Chart at number two, selling 140,000 copies in its first week; it was only 748 copies behind Boyzone's single. The single was eventually certified Gold by the British Phonographic Industry (BPI) on 11 June 1999, denoting shipments of 400,000 copies in the region. In May 2014, the Official Charts Company revealed that the song was Halliwell's fourth biggest selling solo single in the United Kingdom, with a total of 320,000 copies sold.

Across other parts of Europe, "Look at Me" was also successful; it reached number two in Scotland; and peaked inside the top ten in countries such as Finland, Greece, Italy and Spain, and inside the top twenty in Belgium's Walloon region and Sweden, where it was certified Gold by Grammofonleverantörernas förening (GLF) for shipments of 15,000 copies. Across the pan-Eurochart Hot 100 Singles, the track peaked at number five. In Oceania, the song was also a success, peaking at number three in Australia, while topping the charts in New Zealand. In the former, it was certified Gold by the Australian Recording Industry Association (ARIA) for shipments of 35,000 copies in the country. In the United States, "Look at Me" managed to reach number 12 on the Dance Club Songs chart, compiled by Billboard, while peaking at number 25 in Canada on the chart compiled by RPM, and number three on the tally compiled by Nielsen Soundscan.

== Music video ==
The accompanying music video for "Look at Me" was directed by Vaughan Arnell. The video was filmed in Prague, Czech Republic for two days beginning on 18 March 1999. Additional footage was filmed at Highgate Cemetery in London in March 1999. It was first shown during a press conference in Manhattan on 9 April 1999, before its televised premiere on BBC One's Top of the Pops on 22 April. The music video features four versions of Halliwell: a vamp, a bitch, a virgin, and a sister; she stated that she was "laughing at the stereotypes of women" with these depictions. Most of the music video is black and white, except in one scene in the middle of the video, during the funeral of Halliwell's stage persona "Ginger Spice". She is seen sporting red hair with blonde highlights and a red thorn crown while laughing with eyes wide open. According to herself, the ruby slippers worn by "Ginger Spice" were a reference to the film The Red Shoes (1948). As the video nears its end, Halliwell and her male dancers are dancing on a large staircase and then in front of a fountain. At the end of the video, a message saying "Geri's back!" is shown, with a picture of Halliwell skinny dipping, ending with a double-story lower case g decorated with a halo and an arrowhead tail. An alternate version using pixelization on Halliwell's buttocks was also released.

== Track listings ==
UK, Canadian, and Australian CD single

1. "Look at Me" – 4:08
2. "Look at Me" (Mark!s Big Vocal Mix Surgery edit) – 7:32
3. "Look at Me" (Terminalhead remix) – 5:55
4. "Look at Me" (video) – 4:08
- An alternate version containing four postcards was also released in the UK.

UK and US cassette single

1. "Look at Me" – 4:08
2. "Look at Me" (Mark!s Big Vocal Mix Surgery edit) – 7:32
3. "Look at Me" (Terminalhead remix) – 5:55

European CD single

1. "Look at Me" – 4:08
2. "Look at Me" (Terminalhead remix) – 5:55
3. "Look at Me" (video) – 4:08

Italian 12-inch single

A1. "Look at Me" (Mark!s Big Vocal Mix Surgery edit) – 7:32
A2. "Look at Me" (Mark!s Fantasy dub) – 8:44
B1. "Look at Me" (Sharp Boys vocal remix) – 7:48
B2. "Look at Me" (full length version) – 4:08

Japanese CD single

1. "Look at Me" (full length version) – 4:08
2. "Look at Me" (Mark!s Big Vocal Mix Surgery edit) – 7:32
3. "Look at Me" (Terminalhead remix) – 5:55
4. "Look at Me" (Sharp Boys vocal remix) – 7:48
5. "Look at Me" (Sharp Boys Queeny dub) – 7:21

== Credits and personnel ==
Credits and personnel adapted from Schizophonic liner notes.

- Geri Halliwell – vocals, songwriter
- Absolute – songwriters, producers, instruments
- Mike Higham – programming
- Mark "Spike" Stent – mixing
- Tim Young – mastering

== Charts ==
=== Weekly charts ===
Weekly chart performance for "Look at Me"
Chart (1999)	Peak position
Australia (ARIA)	3
Austria (Ö3 Austria Top 40)	27
Belgium (Ultratop 50 Flanders)	32
Belgium (Ultratop 50 Wallonia)	12
Canada Top Singles (RPM)	25
Canada Adult Contemporary (RPM)	25
Canada (Nielsen SoundScan)	3
Estonia (Eesti Top 20)	7
Europe (Eurochart Hot 100)	5
Finland (Suomen virallinen lista)	8
France (SNEP)	27
Germany (GfK)	22
Greece (IFPI)	4
Hungary (Mahasz)	4
Iceland (Íslenski Listinn Topp 40)	21
Ireland (IRMA)	3
Italy (Musica e dischi)	5
Italy Airplay (Music & Media)	2
Netherlands (Dutch Top 40)	24
Netherlands (Single Top 100)	26
New Zealand (Recorded Music NZ)	1
Scottish Singles Sales (Official Charts)	2
Spain (Promusicae)	6
Sweden (Sverigetopplistan)	14
Switzerland (Schweizer Hitparade)	15
UK Singles (Official Charts)	2
US Dance Club Songs (Billboard)	12

=== Year-end charts ===
Year-end chart performance for "Look at Me"
Chart (1999)	Position
Australia (ARIA)	51
Belgium (Ultratop 50 Wallonia)	62
Europe (Eurochart Hot 100)	84
Netherlands (Dutch Top 40)	178
Romania (Romanian Top 100)	47
UK Singles (OCC)	56

== Certifications ==
Certifications and sales for "Look at Me"
Region	Certification	Certified units/sales
Australia (ARIA)	Gold	35,000^{^}
Sweden (GLF)	Gold	15,000^{^}
United Kingdom (BPI)	Gold	400,000^{^}
^{^} Shipments figures based on certification alone.

== Release history ==
Release dates and formats for "Look at Me"
Region	Date	Format(s)	Label(s)	Ref.
United Kingdom	10 May 1999	CD; cassette	EMI	
Canada	11 May 1999	CD	EMI	
United States	17 May 1999	Airplay	Capitol	
Japan	16 June 1999	CD	EMI	
