= Love Is on the Line =

Single by Edyta Górniak
- Released: 1995
- Genre: Pop
- Length: 4:10
- Label: ORCA; Pomaton EMI
- Songwriter(s): Kylie Minogue; Charlie Mallozzi; Marco Sabiu
- Producer(s): The Rapino Brothers

Edyta Górniak singles chronology
"Once in a Lifetime" (1994)	"Love Is on the Line" (1995)	"To Atlanta" (1996)

"Love Is on the Line" is the second single by Polish singer Edyta Górniak, written by Australian singer Kylie Minogue.

== Background ==
"Love Is on the Line" was originally written by Australian singer Kylie Minogue for a promo called Sessions in 1993.

The single was released in Poland only. The song was not released on any album and there is no music video. On 22 November 1999, "Love Is on the Line" received a platinum award by Polish ZPAV (Polish Society of the Phonographic Industry).

The single cover includes pictures by photographer Adam Krzywka.

== Track listings and formats ==
Cassette single; maxi-CD single

1. "Love Is on the Line" (radio edit) – 4:10
2. "Love Is on the Line" (extended version) – 6:16
3. "Love Is on the Line" (No Way Jose mix) – 5:28
4. "Love Is on the Line" (acapella) – 2:02

== Certifications ==
Region	Certification	Certified units/sales
Poland (ZPAV)	Platinum	20,000^{*}
^{*} Sales figures based on certification alone.
