= Bag It Up =

2000 single by Geri Halliwell

Single by Geri Halliwell

from the album Schizophonic
- B-side: "These Boots Are Made for Walkin'"; "Perhaps, Perhaps, Perhaps"
- Released: 13 March 2000
- Genre: Disco
- Length: 3:46
- Label: EMI
- Songwriters: Geri Halliwell; Andy Watkins; Paul Wilson
- Producer: Absolute

Geri Halliwell singles chronology
"Lift Me Up" (1999)	"Bag It Up" (2000)	"It's Raining Men" (2001)

Music video
- "Bag It Up" on YouTube

"Bag It Up" is a song recorded by British singer and songwriter Geri Halliwell for her debut solo album Schizophonic (1999). It was written by Halliwell, Andy Watkins, Paul Wilson and produced by Absolute. It was released as the fourth and final single from Schizophonic on 13 March 2000, by EMI Records, and topped the UK Singles Chart, becoming Halliwell's third consecutive number-one single in the UK.

== Composition ==
The backing vocals for the song were provided by Tracy Ackerman and Pepsi & Shirlie, formerly of Wham!.

== Chart performance ==
"Bag It Up" sold 106,000 copies in its first week, becoming Halliwell's third consecutive solo number one on the UK Singles Chart. It has sold over 266,000 copies and has been certified silver by the British Phonographic Industry.

== Music video ==
The music video to "Bag It Up" was filmed in January 2000 and was directed by Dawn Shadforth. The video for "Bag It Up" is based around a humorous and raunchy nature. It begins with an advert promoting the male-behaviour-altering "Girl Powder". Girl Powder, administered in small doses, transforms any male into an obedient domestic servant and also a sex slave. The video starts with a domestic scene. Geri and her shirtless 'boyfriend' (played by Aiden Turner) are sitting down in a living room watching television when an advert comes on for Girl Powder, which declares that it is "Heaven in a box". Halliwell is seen doing all the housework and cooking for her 'boyfriend'. She then goes to the kitchen to make him coffee, when really she is preparing the Girl Powder drink. Once her boyfriend drinks it, his hair becomes pink and he has been transformed into a subservient male. The action then moves to the "Girl Powder" factory, where Geri has been transformed into a catsuit-clad superheroine boss, controlling (along with other females in white lab coats) a factory operated by many pink-haired men. The next time Geri and her boyfriend are seen, the roles have been reversed. Geri is now the one in control, with the semi-clad sex slave pandering to her every whim, even acting as a human table. We then return to the factory, where Geri eventually strips the oiled-up dancers down to hot pants, bunny ears and high-heeled ankle boots. Eventually they end up pole-dancing, acting as bunny boys and parodying Playboy Bunnygirls, this time with the male as the sex object. We then see Geri parading the bunny boys on a leash at the end of the video, exhorting female listeners to "Treat him like a lady" and declaring "Who's wearing the trousers now?". The video ends with a white background and Geri's symbol as the TV switches off.

== Live performances ==
To promote the single, Halliwell performed the song on Top of the Pops, Pepsi Chart, CD:UK, Live & Kicking, Party in the Park and 2000 BRIT Awards.

The performance at the 2000 BRIT Awards was raunchy and controversial, with Halliwell emerging from a pair of giant inflatable legs, accompanied by a troupe of pink-haired male dancers. During the song, the dancers stripped down to pink hotpants while Halliwell unbuttoned her shirt before walking over the kneeling dancers. According to herself, terrorist David Copeland planned to kill her during her performance at the awards show due to her "loving the gays", as well as her friendship with singer George Michael, who was also gay.

== Track listings ==
UK CD1

1. "Bag It Up"
2. "These Boots Are Made for Walking"
3. "Perhaps, Perhaps, Perhaps"
4. "Bag It Up" (video)

UK CD2

1. "Bag It Up"
2. "Bag It Up" (D-Bop's Chocolate vocal edit)
3. "Bag It Up" (Trouser Enthusiasts' edit)
4. "Bag It Up" (Yomanda edit)

UK and New Zealand cassette single

1. "Bag It Up"
2. "These Boots Are Made for Walking"
3. "Perhaps, Perhaps, Perhaps"

European CD single

1. "Bag It Up"
2. "These Boots Are Made for Walking"
3. "Bag It Up" (video)

== Charts ==
=== Weekly charts ===
Chart (2000)	Peak position
Europe (European Hot 100 Singles)	9
Germany (GfK)	79
Iceland (Íslenski Listinn Topp 40)	22
Ireland (IRMA)	6
Italy (FIMI)	13
Italy Airplay (Music & Media)	7
Netherlands (Single Top 100)	62
New Zealand (Recorded Music NZ)	18
Scottish Singles Sales (Official Charts)	1
Sweden (Sverigetopplistan)	53
Switzerland (Schweizer Hitparade)	66
UK Singles (Official Charts)	1

=== Year-end chart ===
Chart (2000)	Position
Ireland (IRMA)	88
UK Singles (OCC)	42

== Certifications ==
Region	Certification	Certified units/sales
United Kingdom (BPI)	Silver	266,000
