= Anything (Edyta Górniak song) =

- European commercial CD single

Single by Edyta Górniak

from the album Edyta Gorniak
- B-side: "That's The Way I Feel About You"
- Released: 1998
- Genre: Pop; dance-pop
- Label: EMI Music
- Songwriters: Pam Sheyne; Will Mowat
- Producer: Christopher Neil

Edyta Górniak singles chronology
"One and One" (1997)	"Anything" (1998)	"Impossible" (2003)

Music video
- "Anything" on YouTube

"Anything" is a song by Polish singer Edyta Górniak, released in 1998, by EMI Music, as the second single from her self-titled second studio album (1997). The song was written by Pam Sheyne and Will Mowat, and produced by Christopher Neil. It charted in Poland and Belgium, and had some success in Spain. The maxi single includes a cover of A-Ha's song "Hunting High and Low", which was initially available as a bonus track only on the Japanese edition of the album. The single cover includes pictures by photographer Marlena Bielińska.

== Music video ==
The accompanying music video for "Anything" was directed by Phil Griffin. The video starts with Gorniak singing in a black room. Then she dances with a group of dancers in front of her lover. In the next scene she is sitting at the edge of a bed, while her lover is sleeping. In some scenes, Gorniak sits on the floor in front of her lover in a room with a red floor and white and red walls. He kisses her and she is also shown hugged and lying close to her lover in bed or sitting on a chair. The video ends with a close-up view of Gorniak.

== Track listing ==
- CD single
1. "Anything" (Album Version) (3:57)
2. "That's The Way I Feel About You" (3:59)
- Maxi single
1. "Anything" (3:57)
2. "That's The Way I Feel About You" (3:59)
3. "Hunting High and Low" (3:39)

== Charts ==
Chart (1997–1998)	Peak position
Belgium (Ultratip Bubbling Under Flanders)	8

== Credits and personnel ==
- Written by: Pam Sheyne, Will Mowat
- Producer: Christopher Neil
- Engineer, Mixed by: Simon Hurrell
- Assistant engineer: Gareth Ashton, Neil Tucker, Robert Catermole
- Electric guitar: Robbie McIntosh
- Keyboards, Bass, Drum Programming: Steve Pigott
- Additional keyboards: Nigel Rush, Christopher Neil
- Photo: Marlena Bielińska
- Recording company: EMI Music
