= To Atlanta =

Single by Edyta Górniak
- Released: 1996
- Recorded: May 1996
- Genre: Pop
- Length: 3:41
- Label: ORCA, Pomaton EMI
- Songwriters: Jacek Cygan, Rafał Paczkowski
- Producer: Rafał Paczkowski

Edyta Górniak singles chronology
"Love Is On The Line" (1995)	"To Atlanta" (1996)	"When You Come Back To Me" (1997)

“To Atlanta” (This is Atlanta) is a single by Edyta Górniak for the 1996 Olympic Games.

== Background ==
"To Atlanta" was the Polish anthem for the Olympic Games '96 which took place in Atlanta, United States. The single was released exclusively in Poland and was produced for Polish Olympic Foundation. The song has never been released on any of Edyta's albums.

The single cover includes pictures of Edyta (by Marlena Bielińska) as well as various athletes (by IndexStock).

== Track listings ==
CD single

1. "To Atlanta" (3:41)
2. "To Atlanta" (wersja akustyczna) (3:49)
3. "To Atlanta" (wersja symfoniczna) (3:03)

Cassette

1. "To Atlanta" (3:41)
2. "To Atlanta" (wersja akustyczna) (3:49)
3. "To Atlanta" (wersja symfoniczna) (3:03)
