= EKG (album) =

E·K·G

Studio album by Edyta Górniak
- Released: 2007
- Genre: Pop
- Length: 46:11
- Label: Agora SA, EG Production

Edyta Górniak chronology
Perła (2002)	E·K·G (2007)	My (2012)

E·K·G is the fourth studio album by singer Edyta Górniak. It was released in Poland only.

== Background ==
It was her first album after her separation from EMI Music, also marking Edyta Górniak's debut as a songwriter. She wrote the lyrics for the songs "Cygańskie serce", "Błękit myśli", and the adaptation to Polish of the Céline Dion's song "I Surrender" called "List". The album was certified gold on 19 November 2007 for 15,000 sold copies and was certified platinum a few weeks later, on 5 December 2007, for sales of 45,000. The album artwork features photos by photographer Tomasz Drezwinski.

== Track listing ==
1. Dziękuję Ci (4:41)
2. Cygańskie serce (3:44)
3. To, co najlepsze (4:06)
4. Loving You (4:27)
5. Nie wierzyć nie mam sił (4:00)
6. Aleja gwiazd (4:11)
7. Love Is a Lonely Game (3:53)
8. Another Love Song (3:48)
9. Błękit myśli (4:24)
10. List (4:31)
11. Ready 4 Love (5:26)

== Promo singles ==
- Loving You (2006)
- List (2007)
- Dziękuję Ci (2008)

== Music video ==
=== List ===
"List" is the Polish language adaptation of Céline Dion's song "I Surrender" that appeared on her album A New Day Has Come in 2002. For the promotion of the album, a music video was made for the song “List”. The video was filmed in the Old Town of Warsaw.

List was directed by Polish director Mirosław Kuba Brożek, who had previously directed the music video for the charity single "Wystarczy chcieć". The music video is set in the early 20th century, featuring Edyta herself and a girl in the role of a young Edyta.
