= Edyta Górniak (album) =

- Polish variant of the standard artwork

Studio album by Edyta Górniak
- Released: November 7, 1997
- Recorded: 1996–1997
- Genre: Pop
- Label: EMI Music
- Producer: Christopher Neil

Edyta Górniak chronology
Dotyk (1995)	Edyta Górniak (1997)	Live '99 (1999)

Singles from Edyta Górniak
- 1. "When You Come Back To Me"; 2. "Anything"; 3. "One & One"

Edyta Górniak is the second studio album and first international album by Polish singer Edyta Górniak. It was released in Japan under the name Kiss Me, Feel Me.

== Reception ==
The eponymous album sold more than 150,000 copies worldwide and was successful in Japan, South Africa, and Europe. It was certified a Platinum album by the Polish Society of the Phonographic Industry (ZPAV) in 1998.

== Track listing ==
=== Standard release ===
1. "Anything"
2. "If I Give Myself (Up) To You"
3. "Perfect Moment"
4. "When You Come Back To Me"
5. "Be Good Or Be Gone"
6. "One & One"
7. "Linger"
8. "Soul Boy"
9. "I Don't Know What's On Your Mind"
10. "The Day I Get Over You"
11. "Miles & Miles Away"
12. "That's The Way I Feel About You"
13. "Gone"

=== Japanese version (entitled Kiss Me, Feel Me) ===
14. "Coming Back To Love" (Bonus track)
15. "Hunting High & Low" (Bonus track)
16. "Under Her Spell" (Bonus track)

=== Polish special re-edition ===
14. "Hunting High & Low" (Bonus track)
15. "Coming Back To Love" (Bonus track)
16. "Hope For Us" (Duet with José Carreras) (Bonus track)

== Release history ==
- Japan: November 7, 1997
- Poland: November 10, 1997
- Switzerland: 1998

== Charts ==
Chart (2008)	Peak position
Finnish Albums Chart	22
Norwegian Albums Chart	13
Polish Albums Chart	1
Swedish Albums Chart	18
Swiss Albums Chart	40
