= Dotyk =

Studio album by Edyta Górniak
- Released: May 9, 1995
- Genre: Pop
- Length: 50:15
- Label: Pomaton EMI
- Producer: Wojtek Olszak

Edyta Górniak chronology
Dotyk (1995)	Edyta Gorniak (1997)

Singles from Dotyk
- 1. "Once in a Lifetime – To nie ja"

Dotyk is the debut studio album by Polish singer Edyta Górniak which was released in Poland on May 8, 1995, by Pomaton EMI.

The album sold over half a million copies. It peaked at number 17 on the Polish albums chart and has been certified diamond by the Polish Society of the Phonographic Industry (ZPAV) on 21 May 2025.

== Track listing ==
1. "Jestem kobietą"
2. "Będę śniła"
3. "Dotyk"
4. "Szyby"
5. "Niebo to my"
6. "Nie opuszczaj mnie"
7. "Litania"
8. "Kasztany"
9. "Pada śnieg"
10. "To nie ja"
11. "Jej portret"

== Singles ==
- "Once in a Lifetime – To nie ja"

=== Promo singles ===
- "Jestem kobietą"
- "Dotyk"
- "Będę śniła"

== Music videos ==
- "To nie ja"
- "Once in a Lifetime"
- "Jestem kobietą"
- "Dotyk"

== Charts ==
Chart performance for Dotyk
Chart (2020)	Peak position
Polish Albums (ZPAV)	17

== Certifications ==
Certifications for Dotyk
Region	Certification	Certified units/sales
Poland (ZPAV)	Diamond	150,000^{‡}
^{‡} Sales+streaming figures based on certification alone.
