= Grateful (Edyta Górniak song) =

Single by Edyta Górniak
- Released: 24 February 2016
- Genre: Pop; soul
- Length: 3:07
- Label: Universal Music Poland
- Songwriters: Karlina Covington; Monika Borzym-Janowska
- Producers: Monika Borzym-Janowska; Mariusz Bogdan Obijalski; Robert Kamil Lewandowski

Edyta Górniak singles chronology
"Oczyszczenie" (2015)	"Grateful" (2016)	"Andromeda" (2017)

Music video
- "Grateful" on YouTube

"Grateful" is a single by Polish singer Edyta Górniak. The song was released on 24 February 2016. It was written by Karlina Covington, and Monika Borzym-Janowska and produced by Monika Borzym-Janowska, Mariusz Bogdan Obijalski, Robert Kamil Lewandowski.

The song took third place in the Polish national final for the Eurovision Song Contest 2016, which took place on 5 March 2016.

The single peaked at number 43 on the Polish Airplay Chart.

== Music video ==
An audio to accompany the release of "Grateful" was released on YouTube on February 24, 2016.

== Track listing ==
- Digital download
1. "Grateful" – 3:07

== Charts ==
=== Weekly charts ===
Chart (2016)	Peak position
Poland (Polish Airplay Top 100)	43
Poland (Polish Airplay – New)	2

== Release history ==
Region	Date	Format	Label	Ref.
Poland	24 February 2016	Digital download	Universal Music Poland	
