= Perła (album) =

2002 studio album by Edyta Górniak

- Special edition cover

Studio album by Edyta Górniak
- Released: 11 March 2002
- Label: Pomaton EMI
- Producer: Absolute; Andy Duncan; Andrew Frampton; David Frank; Peter Gordeno; Edyta Górniak; Dave McCracken; Rick Mitra; Chris Porter

Edyta Górniak chronology
Live '99 (1999)	Perła (2002)	E·K·G (2007)

Singles from Perła
- 1. "Jak najdalej" Released: January 2002; 2. "Nie proszę o więcej" Released: March 2002; 3. "Słowa jak motyle" Released: July 2002; 4. "Perła" Released: October 2002; 5. "Impossible" Released: January 2003

Perła (meaning Pearl) is the third studio album by Polish singer Edyta Górniak, released in Poland on 11 March 2002, via Pomaton EMI. On 24 February 2003, a special edition of Perła was released in Poland with new songs and remixes. On 31 March 2003, the album was retitled Invisible and released internationally by Virgin Records. Songs were mainly written and produced by Absolute. Perła reached number one in Poland and was certified gold.

== Polish editions ==
In Poland, Perła was originally released as a two-CD set, with Polish-language songs on the first disc, and English-language tracks on the second disc. Most English songs were written by Tracy Ackerman, Andy Watkins and Paul Wilson, and produced by a British music production team Absolute. Górniak also recorded Polish versions of "The Story So Far" and "The Day Before the Rain", titled "Perła" and "Słowa jak motyle", respectively.

One year later, Perła was re-released as a special edition with new songs and remixes. The first CD featured ballads, and the second-one uptempo songs. The new tracks included Absolute-produced international single "Impossible" and "Talk to Me", and also "Calling You" and "Don't You Know You" produced by Andy Duncan. The album also included remixes of "Impossible" and "Perła", and an extended version of "Sleep with Me". "Cross My Heart" was retitled "X My Heart". However, four songs were excluded from the re-released album: "If You Could", "The Day Before the Rain", "Prezenty" and the original version of "Perła".

=== Track listing ===
Perła – 2002 Polish edition (disc one)
No.	Title	Writer(s)	Producer(s)	Length
1.	"Jak najdalej"	Piotr Siejka; Ryszard Kunce	Edyta Górniak	4:31
2.	"Obłok"	Siejka; Marcin Perzyna	Górniak	4:18
3.	"Nie proszę o więcej"	Edyta Bartosiewicz	Górniak	4:04
4.	"Słowa jak motyle"	Tracy Ackerman; Andy Watkins; Paul Wilson; Elżbieta Wróblewska	Absolute; Dave McCracken	4:32
5.	"Perła"	Ackerman; Watkins; Wilson; Bartosiewicz	Absolute	4:28
6.	"Mogę zapomnieć ciebie"	Siejka; Kunce	Górniak	3:10
7.	"Prezenty"	Adam Sztaba; Perzyna	Górniak	4:35

Perła – 2002 Polish edition (disc two)
No.	Title	Writer(s)	Producer(s)	Length
1.	"The Story So Far"	Ackerman; Watkins; Wilson	Absolute	4:26
2.	"Sit Down"	Ackerman; Watkins; Wilson	Absolute	3:33
3.	"The Day Before the Rain"	Ackerman; Watkins; Wilson	Absolute; McCracken	4:34
4.	"How Do You Know"	Ackerman; Watkins; Wilson	Absolute	4:14
5.	"Cross My Heart"	Ackerman; Watkins; Wilson	Absolute	3:38
6.	"Invisible"	Ackerman; Watkins; Wilson	Absolute	5:18
7.	"As If"	Guy Roche; Shelly Peiken	Absolute	3:25
8.	"Hold On Your Heart"	Simon Franglen; Angela Lupino	Absolute	4:42
9.	"If You Could"	Watkins; Wilson; Shernette May	Absolute	4:16
10.	"Make It Happen"	Ackerman; Watkins; Wilson	Absolute	4:09
11.	"Whatever It Takes"	John Reid; Franglen	Chris Porter; Rick Mitra; Peter Gordeno	3:47
12.	"Can't Say No"	Steve Kipner; David Frank; Andrew Frampton	Frank; Frampton	3:45
13.	"Sleep with Me"	Billy Steinberg; Rick Nowels; Marie-Claire D'Ubaldo	Górniak; McCracken^{[a]}; Absolute^{[b]}	3:08

Perła – 2003 Polish special edition (disc one)
No.	Title	Writer(s)	Producer(s)	Length
1.	"Invisible"	Ackerman; Watkins; Wilson	Absolute	5:17
2.	"Nie proszę o więcej"	Bartosiewicz	Górniak	4:06
3.	"Whatever It Takes"	Reid; Franglen	Porter; Mitra; Gordeno	3:46
4.	"Don't You Know You"	Jamie Jazz; Marta Dawson	Andy Duncan	4:44
5.	"Calling You"	Robert Telson	Duncan	4:28
6.	"Słowa jak motyle"	Ackerman; Watkins; Wilson; Wróblewska	Absolute; McCracken	4:33
7.	"Hold On Your Heart"	Franglen; Lupino	Absolute	4:41
8.	"The Story So Far"	Ackerman; Watkins; Wilson	Absolute	4:25
9.	"Sleep with Me"	Steinberg; Nowels; D'Ubaldo	Górniak; McCracken^{[a]}; Absolute^{[b]}	3:18

Perła – 2003 Polish special edition (disc two)
No.	Title	Writer(s)	Producer(s)	Length
1.	"How Do You Know"	Ackerman; Watkins; Wilson	Absolute	4:13
2.	"Sit Down"	Ackerman; Watkins; Wilson	Absolute	3:32
3.	"Mogę zapomnieć ciebie"	Siejka; Kunce	Górniak	3:13
4.	"Can't Say No"	Kipner; Frank; Frampton	Frank; Frampton	3:45
5.	"Talk to Me" (featuring Flo)	Watkins; Wilson; May; Flo	Absolute	3:27
6.	"Obłok"	Siejka; Perzyna	Górniak	4:20
7.	"X My Heart"	Ackerman; Watkins; Wilson	Absolute	3:37
8.	"As If"	Roche; Peiken	Absolute	3:25
9.	"Jak najdalej"	Siejka; Kunce	Górniak	4:33
10.	"Perła" (Absolute Dance Remix)	Ackerman; Watkins; Wilson; Bartosiewicz	Absolute	4:12
11.	"Make It Happen"	Ackerman; Watkins; Wilson	Absolute	4:08
12.	"Impossible"	Ackerman; Watkins; Wilson	Absolute	4:18
13.	"Impossible" (Paradise City Radio Mix)	Ackerman; Watkins; Wilson	Absolute	3:56
14.	"Impossible" (Roy Malone King Mix - Edit)	Ackerman; Watkins; Wilson	Absolute	3:34

Notes

- ^{^a} signifies an additional producer
- ^{^b} signifies an executive producer

=== Charts ===
Chart performance for Perła
Chart (2002)	Peak position
Polish Albums (ZPAV)	1

=== Certifications ===
Certifications for Perła
Region	Certification	Certified units/sales
Poland (ZPAV)	Gold	50,000^{*}
^{*} Sales figures based on certification alone.

== International edition ==
Invisible

Studio album by Edyta Górniak
- Released: 31 March 2003
- Label: Virgin
- Producer: Absolute; Andrew Frampton; David Frank; Peter Gordeno; Edyta Górniak; Dave McCracken; Rick Mitra; Chris Porter

Edyta Górniak chronology
Live '99 (1999)	Invisible (2003)	E·K·G (2007)

Singles from Perła
- 1. "Impossible" Released: March 2003; 2. "The Story So Far" Released: May 2003; 3. "Whatever It Takes" Released: August 2003; 4. "Make It Happen" Released: September 2003; 5. "As If / Sit Down" Released: 2003

Perła was retitled Invisible and released internationally on 31 March 2003, via Virgin Records. It included songs already released on Perła and the new single "Impossible", which entered the charts in Germany, Austria and Switzerland.

=== Track listing ===
Invisible – 2003 international edition
No.	Title	Writer(s)	Producer(s)	Length
1.	"Impossible"	Tracy Ackerman; Andy Watkins; Paul Wilson	Absolute	4:18
2.	"Sit Down"	Ackerman; Watkins; Wilson	Absolute	3:33
3.	"Invisible"	Ackerman; Watkins; Wilson	Absolute	5:19
4.	"How Do You Know"	Ackerman; Watkins; Wilson	Absolute	4:14
5.	"The Story So Far"	Ackerman; Watkins; Wilson	Absolute	4:26
6.	"The Day Before the Rain"	Ackerman; Watkins; Wilson	Absolute; Dave McCracken	4:35
7.	"Cross My Heart"	Ackerman; Watkins; Wilson	Absolute	3:38
8.	"Make It Happen"	Ackerman; Watkins; Wilson	Absolute	4:09
9.	"Hold On Your Heart"	Simon Franglen; Angela Lupino	Absolute	4:43
10.	"If You Could"	Watkins; Wilson; Shernette May	Absolute	4:17
11.	"As If"	Guy Roche; Shelly Peiken	Absolute	3:26
12.	"Can't Say No"	Steve Kipner; David Frank; Andrew Frampton	Frank; Frampton	3:46
13.	"Whatever It Takes"	John Reid; Franglen	Chris Porter; Rick Mitra; Peter Gordeno	3:47
14.	"The Story So Far" (Uptempo Mix)	Ackerman; Watkins; Wilson	Absolute	4:14
15.	"Sleep with Me"	Billy Steinberg; Rick Nowels; Marie-Claire D'Ubaldo	Edyta Górniak; McCracken^{[a]}; Absolute^{[b]}	3:19

Notes

- ^{^a} signifies an additional producer
- ^{^b} signifies an executive producer

== Release history ==
Release dates and formats for Perła and Invisible
Region	Date	Format(s)	Edition	Label
Poland	11 March 2002	CD; cassette	Perła original edition	Pomaton EMI
Poland	24 February 2003	CD	Perła special edition	Pomaton EMI
Various	31 March 2003	CD; cassette	Invisible international edition	Virgin Records
