= To nie ja! =

Polish entry in the Eurovision Song Contest 1994

Single by Edyta Górniak

from the album Dotyk
- Released: March 1994
- Recorded: January 1994
- Genre: Pop; ballad
- Length: 3:05
- Label: Pomaton EMI
- Songwriters: Jacek Cygan; Stanisław Syrewicz
- Producers: Stanisław Syrewicz; Graham Sacher

Eurovision Song Contest 1994 entry
- Country: Poland
- Artist: Edyta Górniak
- Language: Polish
- Composer: Stanisław Syrewicz
- Lyricist: Jacek Cygan
- Conductor: Noel Kelehan

Finals performance
- Final result: 2nd
- Final points: 166

Entry chronology
- "Sama" (1995) ►

Official performance video
- "To nie ja!" on YouTube

"To nie ja!" (Polish pronunciation: [ˈtɔ ɲɛ ˈja]; "It wasn't me!"; often rendered without the exclamation mark) is a song by Edyta Górniak. It represented Poland in the Eurovision Song Contest 1994. This marked Poland's debut at the contest, and consequently the first time that the Polish language had been used in a contest entry. The song achieved second place – at the time the highest ever placing attained by a debut song (even in the first contest, Switzerland won with their second song of the night). It was released as a single in English as "Once in a Lifetime".

The song is a dramatic ballad, with Górniak describing herself as having an "easy world" – seemingly one of easy distinctions between good and bad. She sings that she is not Eve, referring to the Biblical character, and asking for her listener not to blame her for the sins of that figure, and to accept her for who she really is.

== Overview ==
In 1984, composer Stanisław Syrewicz was in Chicago to demonstrate a composition to another composer named Pawel Oczątkowo, to be used by an American band upon the release of their album.

Ten years later, singer Edyta Górniak, while in London, contacted Jacek Cygan to write the lyrics to the music, that she had heard and had won her heart. She said that it should be understandable to people who do not know Polish. It was picked as first Polish representative at Eurovision.

== At Eurovision ==
The result stood as the most successful first-time entry in contest history, until the ballad "Molitva" performed for Serbia by Marija Šerifović won the Eurovision Song Contest 2007. Serbia and Montenegro's entry in the 2004 contest also placed second. At the same contest, Hungarian entrant Friderika, making her country's début with "Kinek mondjam el vétkeimet?" placed fourth, presaging the domination of the contest by Eastern and Central European performers in subsequent years.

Górniak was threatened with disqualification after singing the second half of the song in English during the dress rehearsal watched by the national jury members. An English-language version was later recorded, titled "Once in a Lifetime", with lyrics by Graham Sacher.

The song was performed twenty-fourth on the night, following Russia's Youddiph with "Vyechniy stranik" and preceding France's Nina Morato with "Je suis un vrai garçon". At the close of voting, it had received 166 points, placing second in a field of twenty five.

It was succeeded as the Polish representative in the 1995 contest by Justyna with "Sama".

== English version ==
"Once in a Lifetime"

Single by Edyta

from the album Dotyk
- B-side: "To nie ja"
- Released: 1994
- Genre: Pop
- Length: 3:00
- Label: ORCA, Edel
- Songwriters: Graham Sacher; Jacek Cygan; Stanisław Syrewicz
- Producer: Graham Sacher

Edyta Górniak singles chronology
| "Once in a Lifetime" (1994) | "Love Is on the Line" (1995) |

The English version "Once in a Lifetime" was released as Górniak's debut single and was featured on her debut album Dotyk. It features Górniak telling her lover that their relationship is a "once in a lifetime" event. The original Polish version also appears as the B-side of the single.

The single cover includes pictures by photographer Marlena Bielińska. The cover artwork was designed by Debi Ani Design Associates.

== Music video ==
Two videos were made, one for the Polish version and another for the English version. "To nie ja" starts with Górniak singing on a dark stage surrounded by smoke and blue light. Inserts of her singing in the recording studio occur throughout the video. For "Once in a Lifetime", Górniak wears yellow clothes in front of a white background, while the camera shows her from different perspectives.

== Track listing ==
1. "Once in a Lifetime" (3:00)
2. "To nie ja" (3:00)

== Certifications ==
| Region | Certification | Certified units/sales |
|---|---|---|
| Poland (ZPAV) | Gold | 10,000^{*} |
^{*} Sales figures based on certification alone.
