= When You Come Back to Me (Edyta Górniak song) =

- One of artworks for European releases

Single by Edyta Górniak

from the album Edyta
- B-side: "I Don't Know What's on Your Mind"
- Released: 6 October 1997
- Genre: Pop, Ballad
- Length: 4:05
- Label: EMI Music
- Songwriters: Christopher Paul Pelcer, Nicol Smith, Robert White Johnson
- Producer: Christopher Neil

Edyta Górniak singles chronology
"To Atlanta" (1996)	"When You Come Back to Me" (1997)	"One and One" (1997)

Music video
- "When You Come Back to Me" on YouTube

"When You Come Back to Me" is a song by Polish singer Edyta Górniak, released as the first single from her second album, Edyta (1997). It reached number three on MTV Asia, and was a top 30 hit in Sweden, while peaking within the top 40 in Belgium. The song was written by Christopher Paul Pelcer, Nicol Smith and Robert White Johnson and produced by Christopher Neil. The maxi single includes "Coming Back To Love", which was initially released as a bonus track on the Japanese edition of the album.

== Music video ==
The accompanying music video for "When You Come Back to Me" was shot in the Queen's House of the National Maritime Museum in Greenwich, London by British director Tim MacMillan. It made its world premiere on 6 October 1997 on Polish TV. The video includes scenes of Górniak in the Great Hall of the Queen's House and Edyta re-enacting the role of Audrey Hepburn in the film Breakfast at Tiffany's. There are two versions of the music video.

== Track listings ==
- CD single
1. "When You Come Back to Me" (4:06)
2. "I Don't Know What's on Your Mind" (4:00)
- CD maxi
1. "When You Come Back to Me" (4:06)
2. "I Don't Know What's on Your Mind" (4:00)
3. "Coming Back to Love" (4:08) (non-album track)

== Charts ==
Chart (1997–98)	Peak Position
Belgium (Ultratop)	39
Poland Airplay (Music & Media)	5
Sweden (Sverigetopplistan)	23
