= My (Edyta Górniak album) =

Studio album by Edyta Górniak
- Released: 14 February 2012
- Recorded: 2010–11
- Studio: +2 Sec
- Genres: R&B, pop
- Length: 46:34
- Label: Anaconda Productions
- Producers: Bogdan Kondracki, Beatroots (Piotr Skotnicki, Piotr Remiszewski)

Edyta Górniak chronology
Zakochaj się na Święta w kolędach (2008)	My (2012)

Singles from Nila Naik
- 1. "Teraz - tu" Released: 26 January 2011; 2. "On the Run" Released: 21 June 2011; 3. "Oj... kotku" Released: 27 October 2011; 4. "Nie zapomnij" Released: 13 February 2012; 5. "Consequences" Released: 14 June 2012; 6. "Sens-Is" Released: 14 February 2013

My is the sixth studio album by Polish recording artist Edyta Górniak, released through Anaconda Productions on 14 February 2012 (Valentine's Day). Górniak is a co-writer of some of the songs in this album. One of the promotional elements was a series of meetings at the largest Empik stores in Poland.

In its first week of sales, My reached number 4 on the OLiS chart.

On 8 May 2012, an expanded digital edition of the album was released, featuring two new remixes of the song "Teraz - tu" by Mathea and Mateusz Łapot.

== Track listing ==
Standard edition
No.	Title	Writer(s)	Producer(s)	Length
1.	"Find Me"	Bogdan Kondracki, Karolina Kozak	Kondracki	3:12
2.	"Obudźcie mnie"	Mateusz Łapot, Kozak	Kondracki	3:29
3.	"Teraz - tu"	Jakub Galiński, Katarzyna Piszek, Anna Dąbrowska, Kozak	Kondracki	3:39
4.	"Nie zapomnij"	Beatroots*, Edyta Górniak	Beatroots*	4:11
5.	"Consequences"	Beatroots*, Chris Aiken, Górniak	Beatroots*	3:18
6.	"(Let's) Save the World"	Kondracki, Kozak	Kondracki	3:33
7.	"Tafla"	Piszek, Kozak	Kondracki	3:15
8.	"Dzisiaj dziękuję"	Kondracki, Dąbrowska, Kozak	Kondracki	4:01
9.	"On the Run"	Kondracki, Kozak	Kondracki	3:15
10.	"Perfect Heart"	Kondracki, Górniak	Kondracki	3:51
11.	"Sens-is"	Kozak, Kondracki	Kondracki	5:00
12.	"Africa-Beat-Heart My" (hidden track)	Kondracki, Kozak	Kondracki, Beatroots*	5:11
Total length:				46:32

Digital bonus track
No.	Title	Writer(s)	Producer(s)	Length
12.	"Oj... kotku"	Łukasz Rutkowski, Kondracki, Dagmara Melosik, Kozak	Kondracki	3:23

(*) Piotr Skotnicki, Piotr Remiszewski

== Charts ==
Chart performance for Dotyk
Chart (2012)	Peak position
Polish Albums (ZPAV)	4
