= One and One (song) =

1997 single by Edyta Górniak

"One and One" is a song written by Billy Steinberg, Rick Nowels and Marie-Claire D'Ubaldo. The song was first recorded by Edyta Górniak but first released by Robert Miles (featuring Maria Nayler) in 1996.

== Edyta Górniak version ==
"One & One"
- European CD maxi-single

Single by Edyta Górniak

from the album Edyta Gorniak
- Released: 7 November 1997
- Length: 3:38
- Label: EMI
- Songwriters: Billy Steinberg; Marie-Claire D'Ubaldo; Rick Nowels
- Producer: Christopher Neil

Edyta Górniak singles chronology
"When You Come Back to Me" (1997)	"One & One" (1997)	"Anything" (1998)

Music video
- "Edyta Górniak - One And One [Official Music Video]" on YouTube

The song was first recorded by Polish singer Edyta Górniak, but her version was not released until it was included on her second album, Edyta Górniak (1997). It was issued as a single in Japan in November 1997 and in Europe two years later. The featured live version of "When You Come Back to Me" was recorded on 21 October 1998 in Lisbon, Portugal by Radio RFM at the Lisbon showcase.

=== Music video ===
The accompanying music video for "One & One" includes scenes from the music video for "Anything", some new scenes and private shots.

=== Track listings ===
- CD single
1. "One & One" (3:39)
2. "When You Come Back to Me" (live in Portugal) (4:47)
- French single
1. "One & One" (3:22)
2. "I Don't Know What's on your Mind" (3:58)
- German maxi single
1. "One & One" (3:22)
2. "Under Her Spell" (4:13)
3. "When You Come Back to Me" (live in Portugal) (4:47)
4. "One & One" (SuperChumbo's High Octane mix) (6:43)
- Japanese maxi single
1. "One & One" (3:22)
2. "Coming Back to Love" (4:03)
3. "Never Will I" (4:08)

=== Personnel ===
- Backing vocals: Edyta Gorniak
- Producer: Christopher Neil
- Engineer, mixed by: Simon Hurrell
- Assistant engineer: Gareth Ashton, Neil Tucker, Robert Catermole
- Spanish guitar: Hugh Burns, John Themis
- Keyboards, bass, drum programming: Steve Pigott
- Written by: Billy Steinberg, Marie-Claire D'Ubaldo, Rick Nowels

=== Charts ===
==== Weekly charts ====
Chart (1999)	Peak position
Eurochart Radio Top 50 (Music & Media)	28
France (SNEP)	46
France Airplay (Music & Media)	11
Germany (GfK)	79
Hungary (Mahasz)	11
Iceland (Íslenski Listinn Topp 40)	24
Switzerland (Schweizer Hitparade)	42

==== Year-end charts ====
Chart (1999)	Position
Europe Border Breakers (Music & Media)	15

== Robert Miles version ==
"One and One"
- Artwork for Italian CD maxi-single, also used for one of vinyl releases with different colouring and worldwide digital release

Single by Robert Miles featuring Maria Nayler

from the album Dreamland
- B-side: "4US"
- Released: 4 November 1996
- Genre: Dream house
- Length: 4:00
- Label: DBX
- Songwriters: Billy Steinberg; Rick Nowels; Marie-Claire D'Ubaldo
- Producer: Robert Miles

Robert Miles singles chronology
"Fable" (1996)	"One and One" (1996)	"Freedom" (1997)

Music video
- "One and One" on YouTube

"One and One" was covered by Italian electronic dance musician Robert Miles featuring English singer Maria Nayler and released to radio in August 1996 and physically released on 4 November 1996, by label DBX, from Miles' debut album, Dreamland (1996). Miles' version was the first to be released, as Edyta Górniak's version was released the following year in 1997. The song was Miles' second number one on the US Billboard Dance Club Play chart, and it also peaked at number one in Flanders, Italy, Lithuania, Romania, and Scotland. Michael Geoghegan directed the song's accompanying music video.

=== Background ===
Maria Nayler secured her first record deal with Big Life in 1990 with her band Ultraviolet. Their first release, a cover of the Simon Dupree and the Big Sound's sixties hit "Kites", gained her a significant fan — Sasha. He tracked her down and he and Nayler wrote "Be as One", which reached number 17 in February 96. Similarly, Robert Miles was so taken with Nayler's voice after hearing "Be as One" that he invited her to sing on "One and One".

Miles is known by some collectors of CD singles for the quotes he includes on his jewel case inserts, succinct expressions of what he was attempting to communicate in writing and producing the song. About "One and One", Miles wrote:

...Sometimes, you don't even have the time to realize
what is happening to your life,
that it has already happened...
the world moves too fast...
let's recapture the essence of time."

=== Critical reception ===
AllMusic editor Jose F. Promis described the song as a "magical" and "gorgeous, touching, dreamy song, featuring tender vocals by Maria Nayler, which remains one of the most sincere dance songs of its era." Larry Flick from Billboard magazine wrote that Nayler "brings an appropriately ethereal quality to the cut's warm and pillowy instrumentation. She coos and whispers atop a stream of piano lines that are similar to the infectious tinkling on 'Children', while a quietly insinuating dance beat pushes along at a disco-like pace."

Dave Sholin from the Gavin Report commented, "Well, no one can argue that the words are better this time around. In all seriousness, Miles disproved the long-held belief that Top 40 programmers will not play instrumentals. They do play hits, and after overcoming some initial resistance, "Children" proved itself to be a smash here just as it had been around the world. This followup, which does feature a vocal, has a Euro feel, which B96-Chicago MD Erik Bradley describes as hypnotic. After two weeks of spins, he reports "a ton of calls from women. I think this will be one of the big records for fall." A reviewer from Music Week gave it a score of four out of five, complimenting Nayler's "sweet Madonna-ish vocals [that] combine with a dreamy soundscape from Miles. It's enigmatic — and another big hit."

=== Chart performance ===
"One and One" peaked at number one in Flanders, Italy, Lithuania, Romania and Scotland, as well as on the Eurochart Hot 100. The single entered the top 10 in Austria, Czech Republic, Denmark, Finland, Germany, Hungary, Iceland, Ireland, Latvia, Norway, Sweden, Switzerland and the United Kingdom. In the UK, it reached number three during its sixth week on the UK Singles Chart, on 15 December 1996. Additionally, "One and One" was a top-20 hit in France and the Netherlands. Outside Europe, it reached number one on the US Billboard Dance Club Play chart, number seven on the Canadian RPM Dance chart and number 56 in Australia. The single earned a gold record in Belgium, Germany, Norway, Sweden and the UK.

=== Track listings ===
- 12-inch maxi, Germany
1. "One & One" (original club version) – 6:30
2. "One & One" (David Morales club mix) – 9:00
3. "One & One" (Joe T. Vannelli light mix) – 7:34
4. "One & One" (David Morales one dub) – 11:40
- 12-inch maxi, Italy
1. "One & One" (club version) – 6:30
2. "4US" – 7:41
3. "One & One" (Joe T. Vannelli SLK mix) – 9:11
4. "One & One" (Joe T. Vannelli radio light mix) – 4:05
- CD single
1. "One & One" (radio version) – 4:00
2. "One & One" (club version) – 6:30
- CD maxi, Germany
1. "One & One" (Quivvers Amytiville vocal) – 9:43
2. "One & One" (Quivvers Amytiville dub) – 8:25
3. "One & One" (David Morales journey mix) – 10:00
4. "One & One" (Joe T. Vannelli SLK mix) – 8:50
- CD maxi, Italy
1. "One & One" (radio version) – 4:00
2. "One & One" (radio without the beat) – 4:00
3. "4US" – 7:41
4. "One & One" (Quivvers Amytiville dub) – 8:25
5. "One & One" (David Morales journey mix) – 10:00
6. "One & One" (Joe T. Vannelli radio light mix) – 4:05
7. "One & One" (Joe T. Vannelli SLK mix) – 8:50
- CD maxi, Japan
1. "One & One" (radio version) – 4:00
2. "One & One" (club version) – 6:30
3. "One & One" (David Morales club mix) – 9:00
4. "One & One" (Joe T. Vannelli's light mix) – 7:34
5. "One & One" (Quivvers Amytiville vox mix) – 9:43
- CD maxi, Netherlands
1. "One & One" (radio version) – 4:00
2. "One & One" (Joe T. Vannelli light radio mix) – 4:05
3. "One & One" (club version) – 6:30
4. "4US" – 7:41
5. "One & One" (Quivver's Amytiville vox mix) – 9:42
6. "One & One" (David Morales journey mix) – 9:56
- CD maxi, UK
1. "One & One" (radio version) – 4:00
2. "One & One" (club version) – 6:30
3. "4US" – 7:41
- CD maxi – Remixes
1. "One & One" (extended album version) – 6:30
2. "One & One" (David Morales club mix) – 8:58
3. "One & One" (Joe T. Vanelli light mix) – 7:32
4. "One & One" (David Morales journey mix) – 10:00

=== Charts ===
==== Weekly charts ====
Chart (1996–1997)	Peak position
Australia (ARIA)	56
Austria (Ö3 Austria Top 40)	8
Belgium (Ultratop 50 Flanders)	1
Belgium (Ultratop 50 Wallonia)	2
Canada (Nielsen SoundScan)	2
Canada Dance/Urban (RPM)	7
Czech Republic (IFPI CR)	8
Denmark (IFPI)	3
Estonia Airplay (Eesti Top 25)	1
Europe (Eurochart Hot 100)	1
Europe (European Radio Top 50)	7
Europe Border Breakers (Music & Media)	1
Europe (European Dance Radio)	2
Finland (Suomen virallinen lista)	8
France (SNEP)	16
Germany (GfK)	5
Hungary (Mahasz)	4
Iceland (Íslenski Listinn Topp 40)	10
Ireland (IRMA)	3
Israel (Israeli Singles Chart)	1
Italy (Musica e dischi)	1
Italy Airplay (Music & Media)	4
Latvia (Latvijas Top 50)	2
Lithuania (M-1)	1
Netherlands (Dutch Top 40)	13
Netherlands (Single Top 100)	24
Norway (VG-lista)	3
Romania (Romanian Top 100)	1
Scottish Singles Sales (Official Charts)	1
Sweden (Sverigetopplistan)	3
Switzerland (Schweizer Hitparade)	6
UK Singles (Official Charts)	3
UK Airplay (Music Week)	4
UK Pop Tip Club Chart (Music Week)	27
US Billboard Hot 100	54
US Dance Club Songs (Billboard)	1
US Dance Singles Sales (Billboard)	7
US Rhythmic Airplay (Billboard)	40

Chart (2026)	Peak position
Poland (Polish Airplay Top 100)	70

==== Year-end charts ====
Chart (1996)	Position
Belgium (Ultratop 50 Flanders)	26
Belgium (Ultratop 50 Wallonia)	44
Europe (Eurochart Hot 100)	96
Israel (Israeli Singles Chart)	20
Latvia (Latvijas Top 50)	45
Sweden (Topplistan)	87
UK Singles (OCC)	26

Chart (1997)	Position
Belgium (Ultratop 50 Flanders)	90
Belgium (Ultratop 50 Wallonia)	69
Europe (Eurochart Hot 100)	13
France (SNEP)	76
Germany (Media Control)	62
Norway (VG-lista)	19
Romania (Romanian Top 100)	7
Sweden (Topplistan)	38
UK Singles (OCC)	132

=== Certifications ===
Region	Certification	Certified units/sales
Belgium (BRMA)	Gold	25,000^{*}
Germany (BVMI)	Gold	250,000^{^}
Norway (IFPI Norway)	Gold	
Sweden (GLF)	Gold	15,000^{^}
United Kingdom (BPI)	Gold	400,000^{^}
^{*} Sales figures based on certification alone.^{^} Shipments figures based on certification alone.

=== Release history ===
Region	Date	Format(s)	Label(s)	Ref.
United States	20 August 1996	Rhythmic contemporary radio	Arista	
United Kingdom	4 November 1996	CD1; cassette	Deconstruction	
United Kingdom	11 November 1996	CD2	Deconstruction	
Japan	21 November 1996	CD	Deconstruction; BMG	
