= Absolute (production team) =

British record production team

Absolute are a British music production team responsible for a number of hits in the 1990s and the 2000s.

== History ==
Formed in 1988 by University of Bristol friends Paul Wilson and Andy Watkins, Absolute initially existed under the name 'Bristol Bassline Productions'. They remixed for artists such as Biz Markie and The Chimes. Purportedly, their radical remix of "Take Me" by Everything but the Girl (the 'Clifton Remix') in 1989 inspired Massive Attack to begin working with Tracey Thorn, eventually resulting in the writing of the track "Protection".

In 1991, they underwent a name change to Absolute, which was initially a band/songwriting project spawning two singles, "Don't You Wanna Be Mine" (1991) and "Introduce Me to Love" (1992) on Rhythm King Records, the latter featuring vocals by John Paul Barrett. Following the singles, they ventured into the world of dance remixes and achieved critical acclaim for their work for artists such as Lisa Stansfield, Melanie Williams, the Nightcrawlers, James Taylor Quartet and Al Green.

Pete Evans of Big Life Management approached the pair offering representation. Evans was considering branching out on his own and with the help of Simon Fuller formed Native Management with Absolute as his initial signing. In the 1990s, Tracy Ackerman joined the songwriting duo as a regular writing partner.

In order to have the pair focus on songwriting, Simon Fuller offered the duo a publishing contract through BMG Music. Around this time, Absolute were introduced to a new girl group called Spice, by BMG Publishing's Mark Fox. Informing Fuller of the girls they had found, Absolute asked if he would consider managing them. A period of songwriting commenced and eventually Virgin Records signed the band, now known as Spice Girls.

The first album Spice was released in November 1996 leading to a BRIT nomination for Best Producers. Also in 1996, following an approach by Alan Pell of Polydor Records, the duo wrote the theme tune to the new Mr. Bean movie – a song which would be recorded by Irish pop group Boyzone. The song "Picture of You" went on to win the Ivor Novello Award for Best Song in a Film in 1997.

The subsequent Spice Girls album Spiceworld also had various involvement from the duo who also at the time continued their development of singer/songwriter Shernette May. Their next project (also for Virgin Records) was the writing and production of the second studio album by Kavana. It was at this time that the pair relocated to Italy. During this period, they were contacted by Geri Halliwell, informing them of her decision to leave the Spice Girls and to ask if they would consider writing and producing her solo project. Upon returning to the UK, Watkins and Wilson began working on the project, leading to the May 1999 release of Schizophonic. Their involvement with Halliwell continued across her future albums although to a lesser extent.

In 1999, the pair were asked to contribute songs for Tina Turner's Twenty Four Seven album, working with artists such as Bryan Adams, eventually writing and producing three tracks.

Watkins and Wilson also produced and wrote the second international album of the Polish artist Edyta Górniak, which was released in 2002 in Poland as Perła and in 2003 as Invisible in other European countries.

All in all the duo have produced and written no less than seven UK No. 1 singles, one US No. 1 single, 20 UK top 10 singles and sold in excess of 50 million records worldwide.

In the 2000s, they continued to write and produce music for British pop artists including Will Young, Darius, Atomic Kitten, Girls Aloud, Gareth Gates, Jamelia, Gary Barlow, Andy Abraham, S Club 7, Keisha White and Shaznay Lewis.

In 2006, their song "Do I Make You Proud" was performed by Taylor Hicks, winner of American Idol 2006. In 2008, their song "Even If" was chosen to represent the UK in the Eurovision Song Contest.

== Discography ==
- "Don't You Wanna Be Mine" (Absolute featuring Joe Church)
- "Introduce Me to Love" (Absolute)
- "Just a Friend" (Biz Markie remix)
- "Take Me" (Everything but the Girl remix)
- "Free" (Tammy Payne single)
- "Too Many People" (Pauline Henry remix)
- "Living Inside a Dream" (Nightcrawlers single)
- "Piece by Piece" (Kenny Thomas single)
- Right Now (Atomic Kitten album)
- "Keep On Pushing Love" (Al Green remix)
- "Stop Sign" (Abs single)
- "Picture of You" (Boyzone single)
- "Ultra-Obscene" (Breakbeat Era single)
- Invisible (Edyta album)
- Open Road (Gary Barlow album)
- Schizophonic, Scream If You Wanna Go Faster and Passion (Geri Halliwell albums)
- "Look at Me" (Geri Halliwell single)
- "I'm Every Woman" (Girls Aloud from DiscoMania album)
- "If I Can't Have You" (Jamelia from DiscoMania album)
- "See a Brighter Day" (James Taylor Quartet remix)
- Instinct (Kavana album)
- "I Can Make You Feel Good" (Kavana single)
- "Someday (I'm Coming Back)" (Lisa Stansfield remix)
- "Supernatural" and "Roll the Dice" (Lulu songs)
- "Saturday" (Omar remix)
- "You're My Number One", "Everybody Wants Ya", "Bring the House Down" and "Cross My Heart" (S Club 7 songs)
- "I'm Your Man" (Shane Richie single for Children in Need)
- Spice and Spiceworld (Spice Girls albums)
- "Say You'll Be There", "Who Do You Think You Are", "Too Much" and "Stop" (Spice Girls singles)
- Twenty Four Seven (Tina Turner album)
- "Strange" (Wet Wet Wet single)
- "Light My Fire" (Will Young single)
- "Do I Make You Proud" (Taylor Hicks single)
- "Don't Mistake Me" (Keisha White single)
- "Even If" (Andy Abraham single)
- Open (Shaznay Lewis album)
