= Edyta Górniak =

Polish singer (born 1972)

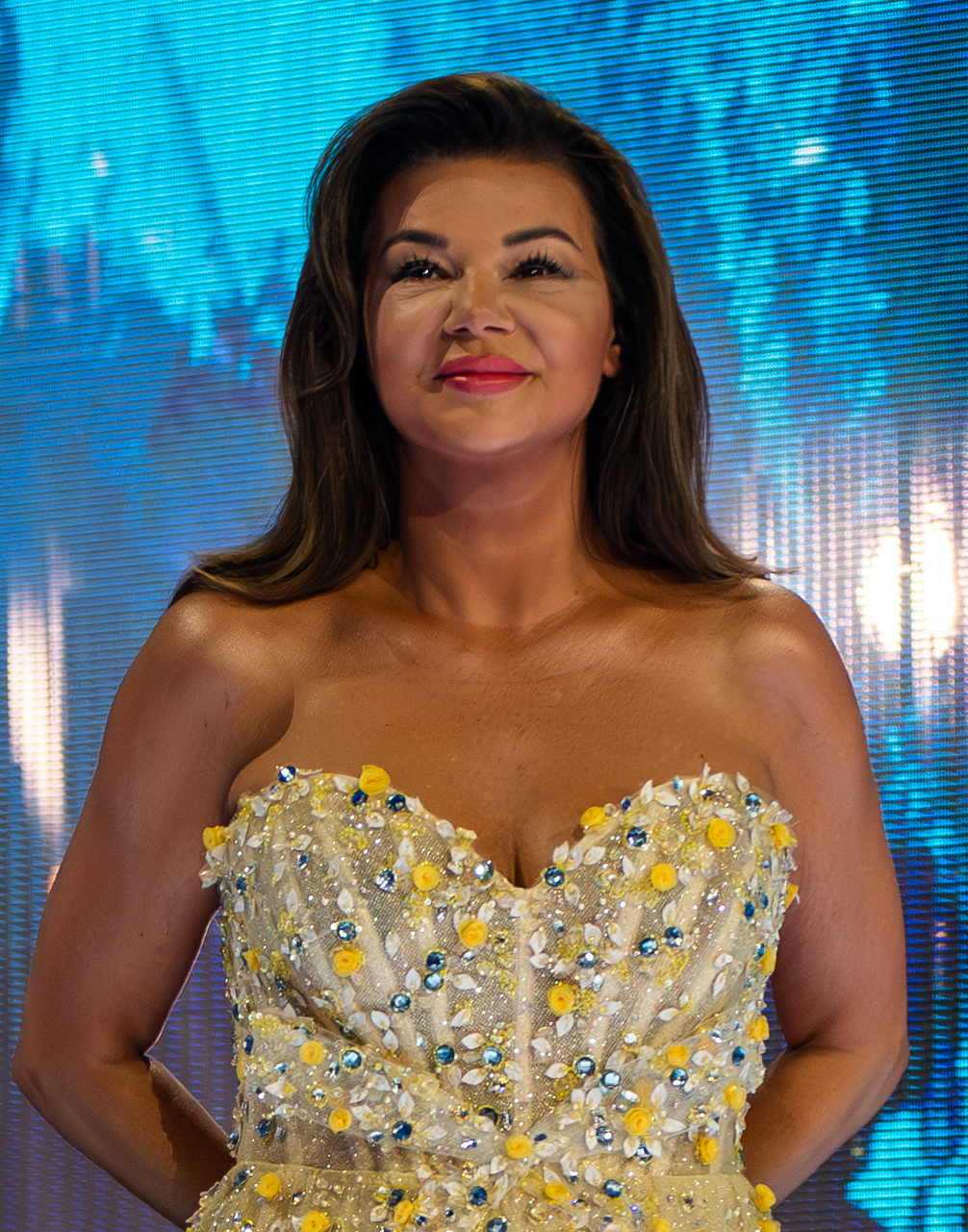
- Edyta Górniak in 2025
- Born: 14 November 1972 (age 54); Ziębice, Poland
- Occupation: Singer
- Spouse: Dariusz Krupa (m. 2005; div. 2010)
- Children: 1
- Musical career
- Genres: Pop, R&B, Adult Contemporary, Soul Pop
- Years active: 1989–present
- Labels: EMI Music; Virgin Music; Universal Music Poland

Signature
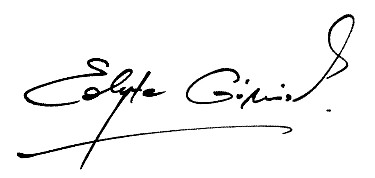

Edyta Anna Górniak (Polish pronunciation: [ɛˈdɨta ˈɡurɲak]; born 14 November 1972) is a Polish singer. She started her career as a musical theatre actress in 1990, and performed in the Tony Award-nominated Metro, the most successful Polish musical of all time, which was also shown on Broadway. Górniak was Poland's first representative in the Eurovision Song Contest in 1994 with the song "To nie ja". She finished as a runner-up which still remains the country's best result at the competition. This started her decades-long career as a pop singer in her native country and internationally. Górniak is also known for her 1997 single "One and One", which charted on the European Radio Top 50. She is the recipient of the Bronze Medal for Merit to Culture – Gloria Artis for her contributions to the arts.

== Biography ==
=== Beginnings ===
Born in Ziębice, Górniak is of Romani descent. After taking singing lessons, in 1989, aged 16, she gave her first public appearance on a Polish television talent show where she won with Sam Brown's hit song "Stop!". In 1990 she performed on the Opole Polish Song Festival in a contest for debuting singers with an honourable mention. During the next three years she performed in music theatres. She was the star of the musical Metro ("Subway") – the most popular and longest running homegrown musical in Polish history, which brought her to Broadway. In New York she was also offered a job by the Elite model agency, but she rejected it preferring to continue her career as a singer. Later she sang in next three musicals in Poland: Do grającej szafy grosik wrzuć ("Put a Dime in the Jukebox") with classic Polish pop songs from the pre-rock'n'roll era, Blues Minus with songs of Polish author Jonasz Kofta and Brel with Polish versions of songs sung by the Belgian singer-songwriter Jacques Brel. In 1993 Górniak took part in the Baltic Song Contest in Sweden and finished in third place.

=== Eurovision breakthrough ===
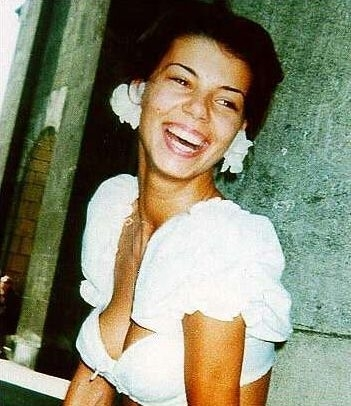
Edyta Górniak in 1992

In 1994, Górniak was the first Polish artist to participate in the Eurovision Song Contest, in which she claimed a highly creditable second place, which still stands as Poland's best showing in the contest. Her song was "To nie ja" ("It's Not Me"), which was also released on a single in English as "Once in a Lifetime".

"To nie ja" proved to be her breakthrough in Poland, becoming there the biggest hit of 1994. Górniak was signed to Polish division of EMI. Her first studio album Dotyk ("The Touch") was released a year later, in May 1995 and sold half-million copies in Poland, receiving a diamond certification from the Polish Society of the Phonographic Industry (ZPAV). It brought new hits "Jestem kobietą" ("I'm a Woman") and the eponymous "Dotyk", which was the biggest Polish hit of 1995. Górniak with her powerful voice and original beauty quickly became an idol of young generation in Poland. In 1996 she signed a contract in London with EMI International for five albums. However, she continued recording for the Polish market, and had three more hits in Poland: Kolorowy wiatr ("Colourful Wind") – Polish version of "Colors of the Wind" from the Disney movie Pocahontas, a club hit Love Is on the Line (which was written by Kylie Minogue) and "To Atlanta!" ("It's Atlanta") – Polish hymn of the 1996 Olympic Games.

=== International career ===
Edyta Górniak is one of the best selling Polish artists in history.

Górniak released her first English-language album Edyta Górniak a year later, in November 1997. Songs were written by writers of many legendary pop classics like: Billy Steinberg ("Like A Virgin" for Madonna), Simon Climie ("I Knew You Were Waiting (For Me)" for Aretha Franklin and George Michael), George Merrill and Shannon Rubican ("I Wanna Dance With Somebody" for Whitney Houston), Siedah Garrett ("Man in the Mirror" for Michael Jackson) or Rick Nowels ("Falling into You" for Celine Dion). However, the mediocre success of the singles When You Come Back to Me (it was popular especially in Scandinavia and Portugal) and One & One (minor hit in France and Germany and the first hit of Polish act charted in history of the Music & Media's European Radio Top 50 airplay chart) let the album's global impact with sales of 500,000 copies internationally, including 150,000 copies in Poland. The journalist of legendary Billboard magazine Fred Bronson chose this album as one of the 20 best albums of the year 1998 all over the world.

Two songs from that album were successfully covered by other artists: One & One by Robert Miles in 1996 (before Górniak's original version was released as a single) – it went to No. 1 on the European singles chart and Perfect Moment by Martine McCutcheon in 1999 – it went to No. 1 in the UK. During the promotion of her international album, Górniak gave concert in Poland with legendary tenor José Carreras and recorded with him a new hit Hope For Us in 1997. She also had two more hits recorded for her Polish audience: Lustro ("Mirror") – Polish version of Reflection from the Disney movie Mulan in 1998 and Dumka na dwa serca ("Dumy on Two Hearts") – theme from the Polish movie With Fire and Sword, which became the biggest Polish hit of 1999.

In 1999, Górniak went on tour through Poland and released internationally the concert album Live '99 in September 1999. In 2000 in Spanish Television TVE her Eurovision song from 1994 was voted the best Eurovision song of the last decade. In 2002, she was dropped from EMI International and signed to Virgin Germany. Her second international studio album was released in Poland in March 2002 under the title Perła ("Pearl"), a year before its international premiere. It was written and produced mainly by the team Absolute, which earlier worked for Tina Turner and The Spice Girls on their latest albums. New songs also were written by Steve Kipner ("Genie in a Bottle" for Christina Aguilera) and John Reid ("When The Heartache Is Over" for Tina Turner). The Polish edition was a double album, which contained additional Polish brand new songs, including hits Jak najdalej ("As Far As Possible") and Nie proszę o więcej ("I'm Not Asking for More").

Górniak was also asked to sing the Polish national anthem (Poland Is Not Yet Lost) at the 2002 FIFA World Cup in Busan, South Korea, which she did. However, her performance had a decidedly mixed reception, being sung at a much slower tempo than usual. In March 2003 international version of Perła was released, under the title Invisible. A brand new club tune Impossible was the first international single from the album. Its mediocre success only in Germany, Austria and Switzerland made Invisible a commercial flop with over ten times worse international sales than her previous studio album. The Polish version called Perła went gold in her native country in a time of phonographic crisis, selling 40,000 units. A year later she was dropped from Virgin and after ten years of cooperation she also left her Polish label. In that time she had another hit in Poland, Nie było ("Never Been"), recorded with Polish metal band Sweet Noise.

=== Independent music ===
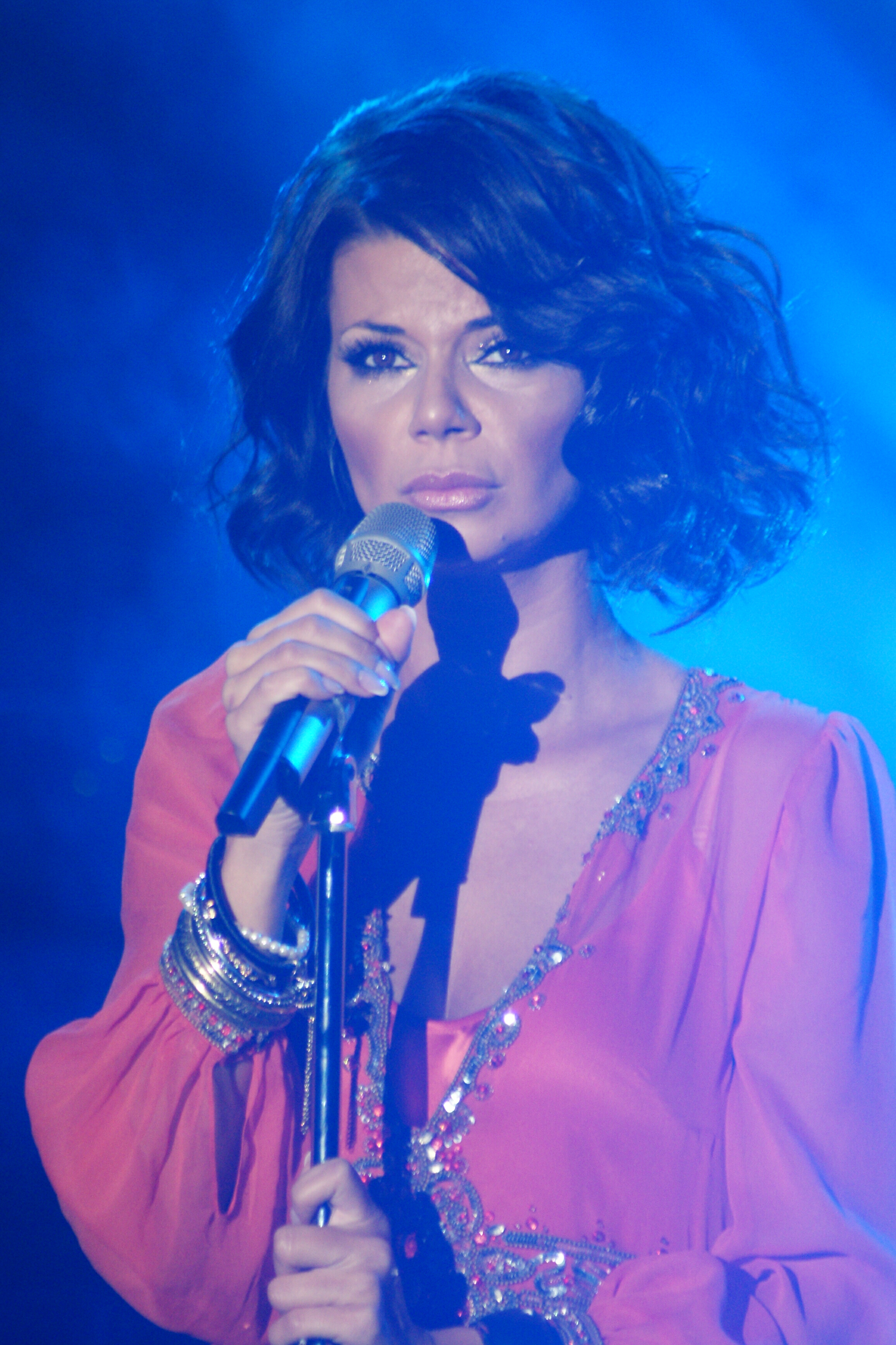
Edyta Górniak in 2009

That same year she gave birth to her son, Allan (b. March 27, 2004). The father of her child was Dariusz Krupa, who worked with her as a guitarist. Together with Krupa she founded their own independent label, EG.Production and Krupa became her manager. First she started a collaboration with the Polish production team Mathplanete to record her new Polish album in a brand new style, with chill-out club music. In 2005, she released the single Lunatique, which was performed in French. That year she married Dariusz Krupa.

To promote another club single Sexuality in 2006, Górniak appeared on the cover of Polish edition of Playboy magazine for the third time. Both singles recorded with Mathplanete flopped on charts, so she dumped the idea of recording club music. The same year she began working on her new international pop album, seeking a new major record label. She chose Sony BMG and the first results of this new direction were the songs Cygańskie serce ("Gypsy Heart") and Loving You. In 2007, she sang another movie theme, this time for the Polish-language version of the animated Spanish movie "Dragon Hill".

From March 2007 to November 2009, Górniak appeared as a judge in six seasons of the Polish version of the TV show "Soapstar Superstar", in which stars of TV series competed for a record deal.

Her first studio album in five years, E.K.G., finally was recorded for her own label. It was released in October 2007 and promoted by the single and her first video in almost five years, List ("Letter"). It was a Polish version of Celine Dion's "I Surrender", which originally was given to her. E.K.G. has moved 40,000 copies in Poland.

=== Later career ===
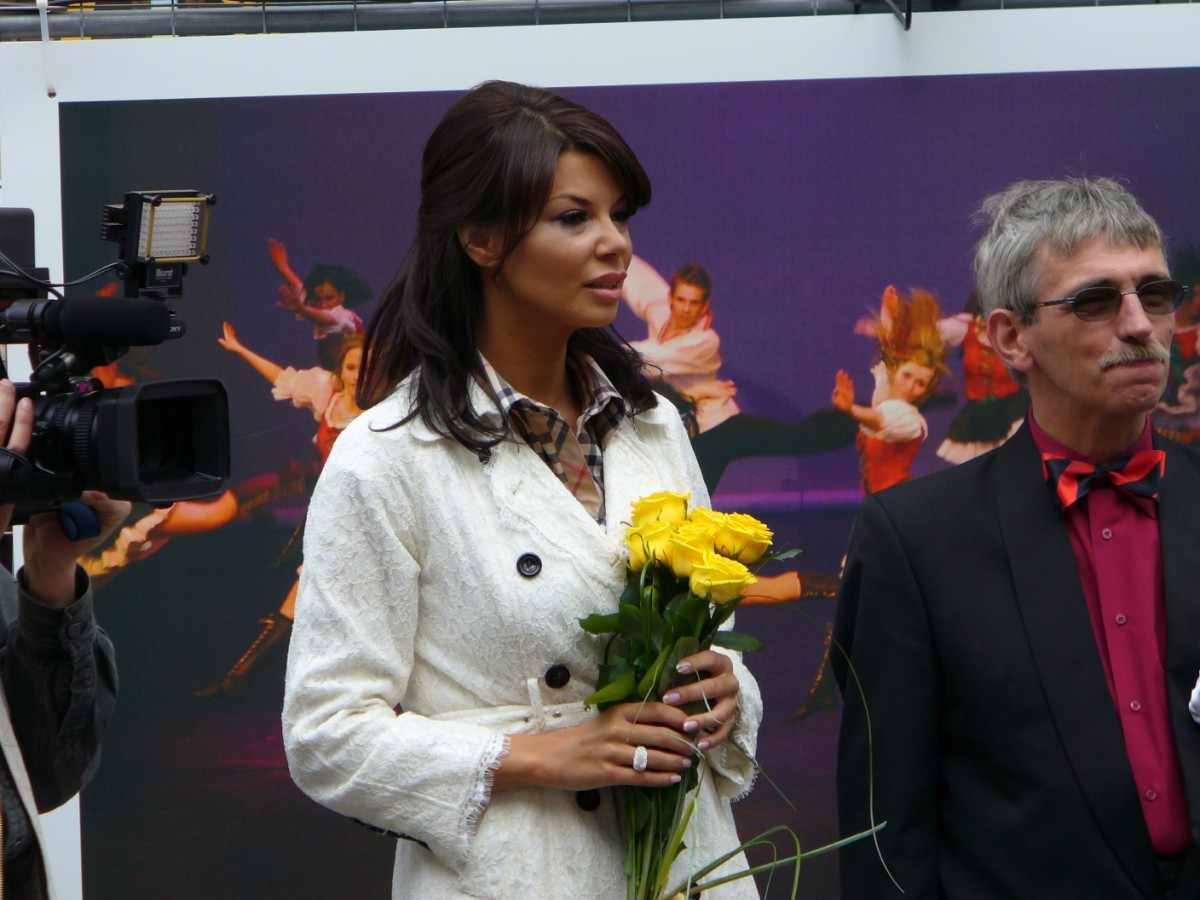
Edyta Górniak in 2009

In November 2008, she released a single To nie tak jak myślisz ("It's Not How You Think"), which was the movie theme from the Polish comedy "To nie tak jak myślisz, kotku". This song became another breakthrough in her career – her first after six years of absence from Polish radio and music television. She also recorded her Christmas album Zakochaj się na Święta w kolędach ("Fall in Love With Carols on Christmas"), released in December with the biggest newspaper in Poland, "Gazeta Wyborcza". In 2009, her marriage to Krupa had ended and she left their own independent label. In 2010, she took part in Taniec z gwiazdami, Polish edition of the TV show Dancing with the Stars.

In 2011, she released the first single from her fifth studio album, Teraz – tu ("Now – Here") and directed its video. Another single, On The Run, also had the video co-directed by her. Later that year she released the single Oj... kotku ("Oh... Kitty"), which was the movie theme from the Polish comedy "Pokaż kotku, co masz w środku". Full album My ("We") was postponed several times until February 2012. It was released by her new own independent label Anaconda and brought brand new electro-pop sound. Next hits were singles Nie zapomnij ("Don't Forget") and the first dance tune since Impossible, Consequences (the latter also with the video co-directed by her).

Also in 2012 she took part in the Polish edition of the TV show "Clash of the Choirs". The same year she gave her second concert in Poland together with José Carreras. In 2013, she recorded Frank Sinatra's classic All The Way, together with Matt Dusk and became a judge of the third series of The Voice of Poland.

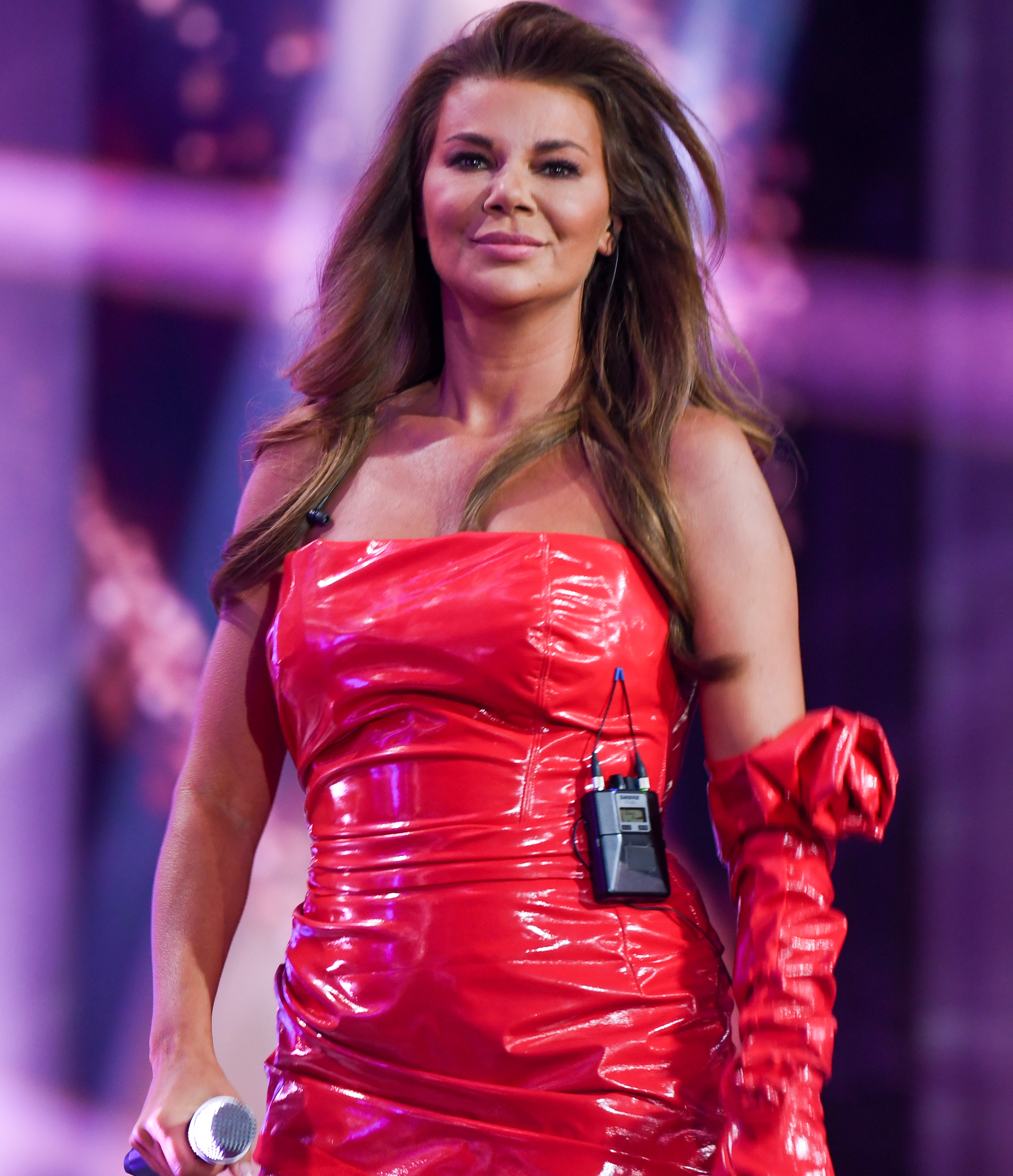
Edyta Górniak in 2023

In 2014, Górniak signed a new record deal with Universal Music and began works on new electro-pop album. She only released four singles from these sessions: Your High with two different videos, Glow On (both in 2014), Oczyszczenie (2015) and Grateful (2016). The latter she submitted for the Polish national final of Eurovision Song Contest 2016, where she finished in third place. In the meantime she returned to The Voice of Poland as a judge for seasons 5 (in 2014) and 6 (in 2015). In 2016, she became a judge of the new Polish TV music talent show for children and teenagers Hit, Hit, Hurra! and in 2017 she was announced as a coach of the first season of The Voice Kids in Poland. She coached Roksana Węgiel, who won the first season of The Voice Kids. Later Roksana Węgiel won the Junior Eurovision Song Contest 2018 in Minsk, Belarus. Górniak also released new singles: Andromeda with Donatan (2017), Dom dobrych drzew ("House of good trees") (2018) and Tylko ty ("Only You") (2018), which is a Polish version of The Andrews Sisters' "Bei Mir Bistu Shein", released for a movie "Dywizjon 303. Historia prawdziwa".

In November 2018, she performed at a special concert "Sto lat" held at the Royal Albert Hall in London to celebrate the 100th anniversary of Poland regaining independence. In 2019, she was a contestant in the Polish edition of the TV show "The Mole". On August 10, 2020, it was announced that Górniak would appear in the eleventh season of The Voice of Poland show as a coach, for her fourth season.

Her career suffered considerably when she began spreading conspiracy theories about COVID-19, among others.

In 2024, Górniak released her second Christmas album My Favourite Winter. In 2026, SkyShowtime released a two-part documentary about her titled Edyta Górniak.

== Discography ==
- Dotyk (1995)
- Edyta Górniak (1997)
- Perła (2002)
- Invisible (2003)
- EKG (2007)
- Zakochaj się na Święta w kolędach (2008)
- My (2012)
- My Favourite Winter (2024)

== Dancing with the Stars ==
Górniak participated in the 12th season of Polish Dancing with the Stars – Taniec z Gwiazdami. She was eliminated after the semifinal round.

Week #	Dance/Song	Judges' score				Result
Week #	Dance/Song	Pavlović	Wodecki	Tyszkiewicz	Galiński	Result
2	Quickstep / "Sparkling Diamonds"	7	10	10	7	Safe
3	Tango / "El Tango de Roxanne"	9	10	10	10	Safe
4	Paso Doble / "Paso Royale"	8	9	10	8	Safe
5	Viennese Waltz / "Wspomnienie"	10	10	10	10	Safe
6	Salsa / "La Vida es un Carnaval"	8	9	10	8	Safe
7	Jive / "Chłopaki nie płaczą"	9	10	10	10	Safe
8	Waltz / "Angel"	10	10	10	10	Safe
9	Samba / "Tyle słońca w całym mieście"	10	10	10	10	Safe
10	Foxtrot / "Manhattan"; Salsa / "La Luz del Ritmo"	6; 9	10; 10	10; 10	7; 10	Bottom two
11	Quickstep / "Jožin z bažin" Rumba / "Liberian Girl"	7; 10	9; 10	10; 10	8; 10	Safe
12; Semi-finals	Cha-Cha-Cha / "Sway"; Argentine Tango / "Tango De Los Asesinos"	9; 10	9; 10	10; 10	9; 10	Eliminated

Awards and achievements
Preceded by None	Poland in the Eurovision Song Contest; 1994	Succeeded by Justyna with "Sama"
