= Spice Up Your Life =

1997 single by the Spice Girls

Single by Spice Girls

from the album Spiceworld
- B-side: "Spice Invaders"
- Released: 3 October 1997
- Recorded: 1997
- Studio: Whitfield Street (London)
- Genre: Dance-pop; Latin pop
- Length: 2:53
- Label: Virgin
- Songwriters: Spice Girls; Matt Rowe; Richard Stannard
- Producers: Matt Rowe; Richard Stannard

Spice Girls singles chronology
"Mama" / "Who Do You Think You Are" (1997)	"Spice Up Your Life" (1997)	"Too Much" (1997)

Music video
- "Spice Up Your Life" on YouTube

"Spice Up Your Life" is a song by the British girl group the Spice Girls from their second studio album, Spiceworld (1997). The song was co-written by the group with Matt Rowe and Richard Stannard, at the same time as the group was shooting scenes for their 1997 film Spice World, while production was handled by the latter two. It is a dance-pop song, with influences of Latin rhythms such as salsa and samba. The song's theme reflects the group desire to "write a song for the world" while the lyrics have been labeled as dance-oriented with a self-promoting message.

Released as the lead single of Spiceworld in October 1997, "Spice Up Your Life" received an extensive worldwide promotional campaign that included a series of appearances on television programmes and presentations at award shows. It received mixed reviews from critics, obtaining divisive opinions for its production and lyrical content. Despite the lukewarm critical reception, the song was a commercial success. It debuted atop the UK Singles Chart, becoming the group's fifth consecutive number one in the United Kingdom and has since been certified double platinum by the British Phonographic Industry (BPI). It performed similarly on the music charts in the rest of Europe and Oceania, while in the United States, the song did not perform as well as their previous releases, peaking at number 18 on the Billboard Hot 100.

An accompanying music video, directed by Marcus Nispel, features the group in a futuristic setting, inspired by the 1982 film Blade Runner, controlling every aspect of society in a dark post-apocalyptic cityscape. The song has been regularly included on the setlists in most of the group's concerts and presentations, most notably their performance at the 2012 Summer Olympics closing ceremony in London. It was also used in the 2023 film Barbie and the third of the Doctor Who 60th anniversary specials, "The Giggle", in which the main villain of the episode (The Toymaker) makes a grand entrance with the song playing in the background.

== Background ==
In May 1997, the Spice Girls went on a promotional visit to the Cannes Film Festival in the south of France, where they announced their then-upcoming movie Spice World (1997). The group began shooting scenes for the movie in June. Meanwhile, Virgin Records started the first marketing meetings for the promotional campaign for their second album Spiceworld, which was set to be released in November 1997. No song had been written for the album at this point, so the Spice Girls had to do all the songwriting and recording at the same time as they were shooting the movie. Between takes and at the end of each filming day, the group usually went straight into a mobile recording studio set up in a Winnebago, which followed them between film sets. Their schedule was physically arduous with logistical difficulties, as Melanie Brown commented in her autobiography: "doing the two full-time jobs at the same time took its toll and within a couple on weeks, exhaustion set in".

For the album, the Spice Girls worked with the same songwriting teams and producers from their debut studio album, Spice (1996). But during the recording of the Spiceworld tracks, the group was so busy with the filming schedule that the quality of their musical contributions became more erratic and piecemeal. Andy Watkins, of the production duo Absolute, co-writers of "Who Do You Think You Are" remembered: "We'd sit there literally all day long and quite often we wouldn't even get them at all." Eliot Kennedy, who co-wrote "Say You'll Be There" with the group, worked on a couple of backing tracks for Spiceworld, but decided not to get involved in the album after hearing from the other teams about the complications of the recording schedule.

== Writing and recording ==
In May 1997, the Spice Girls did a promotional trip to North America in support of their second single "Say You'll Be There", which included a performance on the Mexican television show Siempre en Domingo in Acapulco. According to Emma Bunton, their visit to Mexico was the inspiration behind the song's "Latin feel". The song was written by the Spice Girls with the songwriting team Richard "Biff" Stannard and Matt Rowe. In an interview with Music Week, Stannard commented about their initial ideas for the song: "We were talking about Bollywood films, the colours and how the Spice Girls could present themselves. It was a matter of how do we get everything in to one song?" Rowe recalled the chaotic experience of the recording process of "Spice Up Your Life":

It had been booked in, that they were coming in to record their next single, and write it, with us. It was at Whitfield Street Studios and there was going to be an MTV crew there filming them as they did this, which there was. Well, how on earth can you possibly do this? You can't write and record a song in half-an-hour with a film crew watching.

The session was interrupted constantly, with label executives entering the building, phoning the group, or throwing things through the window. Eventually, when the producers ordered the filming crew to leave the room, the group managed to finish the song. The vocal recording was completed the same day, and instead of taking turns, the five members went inside the isolation booth and recorded the chorus together. Brown commented that for this reason the final mix sounds "spontaneous and full of energy".

=== "Spice Invaders" ===
"Spice Up Your Life" was already finished and ready to be released, but nothing was recorded for the B-side; every other song available had been used in Spice and the group needed a new track for their next single. A session with Paul Wilson and Andy Watkins—the songwriters and production duo known as Absolute—was booked. Because of the limited time and the scarce creative inspiration during the filming of Spice World, Virgin told Absolute to make anything they liked. The duo created "Spice Invaders" by placing four microphones and telling the group to talk about anything they wanted. The conversation was recorded and as Wilson later described it, a "hideous bubblegum" backing track was added to the recorded session. Watkins and mix engineer Jeremy Wheatley, finished the track during the night.

Spice Invaders has received mixed reponses from music critics in retrospectives. In 2018, El Hunt of NME placed it at number eight on his list of "The 10 Best Spice Girls Songs", characterizing it as "an absolute train wreck of a pop song", calling it an "under-appreciated gem" and praising Brown's delivery. The Evening Standard's Jessie Thompson commented that the song "represents everything they were loved for".

Alexis Petridis of The Guardian was less positive, placing "Spice Invaders" at the bottom of his 2018 ranking of the Spice Girls' entire catalog and describing it as "the sound of a group who could, by this point, get away with anything".

== Composition and lyrics ==
"Spice Up Your Life"
A 20-second sample of the song, featuring the group singing the last part of the chorus, followed by a spoken bridge, in which they mention different dance styles, with a backing track that have influences of Latin rhythms such as salsa and samba.

Musically, "Spice Up Your Life" is an uptempo dance-pop song, with influences of Latin rhythms such as salsa and samba. Critics noted that the song incorporates an infectious melody and "haunting" harmonies, mixed with a piano hook and a "relentless" drum beat, that creates a carnival atmosphere. It is written in the key of F minor, with a time signature set on common time, and moves at a tempo of 126 beats per minute. The song is constructed in a verse-pre-chorus-chorus form, opening with an introduction, which consists on the repeated use of the word "la". The first verse, pre-chorus and chorus follows, using a simple chord progression of Fm–C7. The same pattern occurs leading to the second chorus. At the end of the song, a spoken bridge precedes the third chorus, and then closes by repeating the chorus for a fourth time.

Lyrically, "Spice Up Your Life" have been described as an "international rally cry" by Music Week, aimed at a global audience. Melanie C commented about the inspiration behind the song's theme: "We always wanted to do a carnival tune and write a song for the world". Some critics considered the song to be an example of branding or "sloganeering", while the lyrical content has been labeled as dance-oriented ("Slam it to the left / If you’re having a good time / Shake it to the right / If you know that you feel fine"), with a self-promoting message ("Every boy and girl / Spice up your life"). The song includes mentions of different dance styles during the bridge ("Flamenco / Lambada / But hip-hop is harder / We moonwalk the foxtrot / Then polka the salsa / Shake Shake Shake haka"), and lyrics in Japanese, Spanish and German at the end of each chorus ("Hai, si, ja"). The lines "Yellow man in Timbuktu / Colour for both me and you" during the second verse have received criticism for its racist connotation. El Hunt from NME called it "regrettable", while The Irish Times and The Guardian referred to them as "woeful lyrics".

== Release and promotion ==
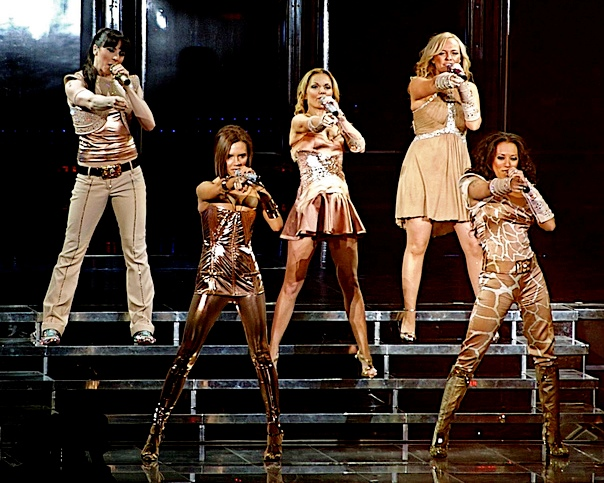
The group performing the song on The Return of the Spice Girls Tour, in Toronto; wearing outfits designed by Roberto Cavalli.

The promotional campaign for the release of "Spice Up Your Life" began the last week of September 1997, when the song started to receive airplay across Europe. On 6 October, the Spice Girls officially unveiled all the tracks from Spiceworld in a press conference in Granada, Spain. The same week, they appeared on the British television programmes Talking Telephone Numbers, GMTV, and The Big Breakfast. The single was originally going to be released in the United Kingdom on 6 October 1997, but the date was delayed for a week in an attempt to displace Elton John's "Candle in the Wind 1997"—a tribute to Princess Diana, who had died two months before—from the top position.

"Spice Up Your Life" was commercially released in the UK on 13 October 1997, in two single versions. The first one, released in cassette and CD maxi single format, included two radio mixes, one from record producer Mark "Spike" Stent, and another from American DJ David Morales, an instrumental version of the song, and the B-side "Spice Invaders". The second version, released in a digipak, contained three tracks: the Stent radio mix, a club mix by David Morales, and a remix by house production team Murk. In the United States, Virgin Records America sent the song to radios on 1 October and the single to record stores on 21 October. The American edition, released in both cassette and CD maxi single format, featured the same track listing as the first UK version.

On 12–13 October 1997, the group performed songs from Spiceworld including "Spice Up Your Life" in a two-night concert in Turkey, as part of a sponsorship deal organized by Pepsi. Following the concerts, the Spice Girls made a couple of weeks of promotion in Singapore, Thailand, India, Hong Kong and Japan, and attended the Bambi Awards in Germany. In November, they appeared at a charity event in South Africa, taped a special concert for Antena 3 in Spain, and did promotion in Italy, France, the Netherlands, and the UK. In December they traveled to Brazil for a press conference, and then to the US to made televised appearances on The Tonight Show with Jay Leno and Dick Clark's New Year's Rockin' Eve, while UPN released a one-hour special dedicated to the group titled Too Much Is Never Enough. During January 1998, while promoting the album and the release of their movie Spice World, the group appeared on the Late Show with David Letterman and The Oprah Winfrey Show, and were featured on the cover of Vogue magazine.

== Critical reception ==
"Spice Up Your Life" received mixed reviews from music critics, with the Latin-inspired production garnering divisive opinions. Andy Gill of The Independent called it a "pseudo-salsa [...] pop pastiche", while the staff of the Miami Herald considered it "a condescending dud". In a similar review, David Browne of Entertainment Weekly described it as a "ha-cha-cha slice of tropical-boat-cruise frivolity". George Varga of The San Diego Union-Tribune believed that the song "does for Latin music what Hanson has done for death metal". Conversely, Newsday's Scott Schinder was pleased with the track, referring to it as a "silly but irresistible uplift". The Sun-Sentinel's Sean Picolli described it as a "salsa-lite hootenanny". The staff of Smash Hits gave it a positive review, calling it a "maraca-shaking Latino aceness" that features a "totally fab chorus". Charlie Porter of The Times called it "fantastic" but described it as "a chorus in search of a good verse". Critic Ian Watson from the Melody Maker was less enthusiastic, commenting that the song's production and instrumentation have a "black magic feel" that evokes depictions of the Mardi Gras and the Day of the Dead, he added that the introduction "sounds almost demonic" and that it resembles the "chant of a dance that goes on for all eternity". The song drew comparisons to the work of other artists. The staff of the Contra Costa Times noticed that the song have shades of Gloria Estefan. The Daily Record went even further, considering that it was a rehash of Estefan's '80s music, labeling it a "throwaway Latinstyle song". Melissa Ruggieri of the Richmond Times-Dispatch believed that the song was a copy of Miami Sound Machine's "Conga", and added that it had a "zingy mariachi-flavored rhythm and infectious chorus chant", while Ann Powers of The New York Times said that it "skates over Latin hip hop from Lisa Lisa to the Lambada". The Dallas Morning News noted influences of ABBA, Bananarama and Bow Wow Wow in the song, and added that it "doesn't quite reach the pop heights of 'Wannabe'". Jim Sullivan of The Boston Globe concurred about the ABBA reference, while describing the song as an "audio Benetton ad".

Some reviewers were critical of the lyrical content. NME's Dele Fadele called "Spice Up Your Life" "the poppermost pop single ever invented", and remarked about its "nonsense lyrics" saying that it represented "the Spice Girls' message of peace to the world". Kevin Courtney of The Irish Times commented that the song "is peppered with the usual 'girl powaaah' cliches", and added that it has "absolutely woeful lyrics". Writing for the Associated Press, David Bauder dismissed it as a song "written by a focus group who told them to add a Latin flavor". The Telegram & Gazette's Craig S. Semon enjoyed the song's melody and harmonies but criticised the lyrical content, commenting that the Spice Girls were "concerned more with shaking hips than moving social consciousness". Larry Flick of Billboard magazine was mixed on the track. Although he described it as "insanely catchy and devilishly fun", he did not considered it a real song, calling it "just a festive cha-cha groove and a lyrical command to add some 'spice' to your life by way of countless dance moves". David Wild of Rolling Stone magazine's had a similar opinion, he called the song "a global call to arms and legs with a distinct carnival-like flavor and a message of Up With Spice People positivity". The Hartford Courant's music critic Roger Catlin called the lyrics during the verses "goofy", and described "Spice Up Your Life" as a combination of "savvy Latin rhythms and a self-promoting lyric of dizzy Esperanto". Chicago Sun-Times critic Jim DeRogatis was unimpressed with the lyrics, yet when comparing it to Aqua's "Barbie Girl", he found that its "unifying sentiment is more admirable".

Retrospective reviews have been generally positive. AllMusic's critic Stephen Thomas Erlewine, commented that the song added Latin rhythms that "consolidates and expands the group's style". On Billboard's 2017 list of the "100 Greatest Girl Group Songs of All Time" it ranked at number 62. On behalf of the publication, Joe Lynch commended the song's "unquenchable energy" and lauded its "joyous samba rhythms and irresistible [...] refrain". Anne T. Donahue of Vulture.com felt that "it kept its energy up to the end and left us wanting more". Alexis Petridis of The Guardian believed that it has a "certain raw energy that powers it along". The Evening Standard reviewer Luke Abrahams described "Spice Up Your Life" as an "instant, wild, chaotic and nonsensical classic", he believed that it "captured the sheer might, power and energy" of the Spice Girls. Will Stroude of Attitude named it the best of the group's single releases, characterizing it as an "unapologetically brash banger which perfectly encapsulates the Spice Girls' bolshy philosphy [sic]". On a 2018 ranking of the group's songs, NME writer El Hunt praised the song for its "haunting harmonies and chaotically plunking piano hooks", and called the "nonsensical bridge" the best part of the song.

== Commercial performance ==
Upon its release as a single, "Spice Up Your Life" debuted on 19 October 1997 atop the UK Singles Chart, with 321,000 copies sold in its first week. This made the Spice Girls the first act to reach number one with their first five singles, and the first to debut at the top of the chart four times in a row. The song spent one week at number one, 12 weeks in the top 40, and 15 weeks in the top 75, ending at the 10th position on the 1997 year-end chart. It was certified double platinum by the British Phonographic Industry (BPI) for sales and streams of 1,200,000 units in December 2022. As of October 2017, it had sold 887,000 copies and had been streamed 4.5 million times in the UK.

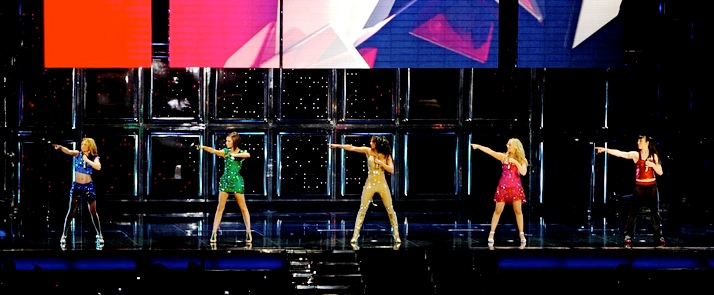
The group performing a remix version of the song during the encore of The Return of the Spice Girls Tour in Toronto, Canada, in February 2008.

"Spice Up Your Life" was commercially successful in the rest of Europe. It reached number three on the Eurochart Hot 100, topping the charts in Hungary, Iceland and Romania, while peaking inside the top five in Belgium (both the Flemish and Walloon charts), Denmark, Finland, France, Ireland, Italy, the Netherlands, Norway, Spain, Sweden, and Switzerland, and inside the top 15 in Austria and Germany. The song was also a radio hit across the continent, reaching the top position of the European Radio Top 50 for three weeks, topping the airplay charts in the Benelux region, Italy and Scandinavia, and peaking inside the top five in the German-speaking countries, Hungary, Spain, and the UK. The song debuted on the Official New Zealand Music Chart at number two on 26 October 1997, where it stayed for four consecutive weeks. It remained on the chart for 15 weeks in total, and was certified platinum by the Recorded Music NZ (RMNZ) for sales of 10,000 units in October 1997. "Spice Up Your Life" debuted on the ARIA Singles Chart at number 17 on 26 October 1997, peaking two weeks later at number eight, and remaining on the chart for 20 weeks. It was certified platinum by the Australian Recording Industry Association (ARIA) for selling 70,000 units in 1997.

"Spice Up Your Life" had moderate success in North America. On 27 October 1997, the song debuted on the Canadian RPM 100 Hit Tracks chart at number 46, later reaching a peak position of number 17 in its fifth week. It fared better on the Canadian Singles Chart, where it peaked at number two. In the US, "Spice Up Your Life" debuted on the Billboard Hot 100 at number 32 on 8 November 1997, at the time it was the group's lowest debut in the country. The song received little support from radio programmers, but it peaked at number 18 on the Hot 100 during its fourth week. The song reached number four on the Dance Club Play chart but only had moderate success on other formats, reaching number 22 on the Maxi-Singles Sales chart, number 27 on the Rhythmic Top 40, and number 37 on the Mainstream Top 40. It received a gold certification by the Recording Industry Association of America (RIAA) for selling 500,000 copies on 13 January 1998. New remixes by American house musician Ralphi Rosario released during the group's 2007–08 The Return of the Spice Girls Tour, reached number 17 on the Dance Club Play chart in July 2008.

== Music video ==
A scene from the Blade Runner-inspired music video for "Spice Up Your Life", showing the group inside a spaceship going through a dark city, controlling every aspect of society.

The music video for "Spice Up Your Life" was directed by Marcus Nispel in a two-day shoot located in New York City. It was edited at Red Car Inc in Los Angeles, and included visual effects by Craig Price. The video features the group in a futuristic setting, inspired by the 1982 film Blade Runner, controlling every aspect of society in a dark post apocalyptic cityscape. Nispel came up with the concept based on a sketch that was faxed to him signed "Ginger Spice". He recalls: "I looked at what Disney did to Times Square in NYC and tried to imagine how the Spice Girls would transform it, as their career seemed to have no limits—at the time." The group was not consulted about the concept. According to Brown's autobiography, they wanted a carnival party theme, but were too tired to fight about it with the label, and ended up with a concept linked to the theme of world domination. Brown commented: "It wasn't right. I don't think any of us liked it much, even though we enjoyed making it. I still can't understand what's going on in it half the time." The music video and a half-hour special with behind-the-scenes footage from the shoot, exclusively premiered on MTV in September 1997.

The video shows the Spice Girls in a spaceship going through a dark rainy city, looking at themselves on various billboards, while shoots of rooms, bars and a prison with televisions plays the videos for "Say You'll Be There" and "Wannabe", and also broadcast live footage of the group inside the spaceship. The girls then zoom aimlessly around the city, between buildings, on flying surfboards. The scenes are interspersed with shoots of each group member in different activities, such as Brown doing turntablism with bright flashing lights and a large rotating fan, Beckham posing on top of a platform while photographers takes pictures of her, Bunton in a room surrounded with neon-blue balloons, Melanie C winning a boxing match and Halliwell giving a speech at a press conference to a crowd of journalists. The video won the award for Best Video at the 1998 Edison Music Awards, and was nominated for British Video of the Year at the 1998 Brit Awards, and for Best Special Effects at the 1997 Music Video Production Association (MVPA) Awards.

On 13 October 2022, the Spice Girls released a new, alternative, version of the "Spice Up Your Life" video, using previously unused visual from the original video shoot.

== Live performances ==
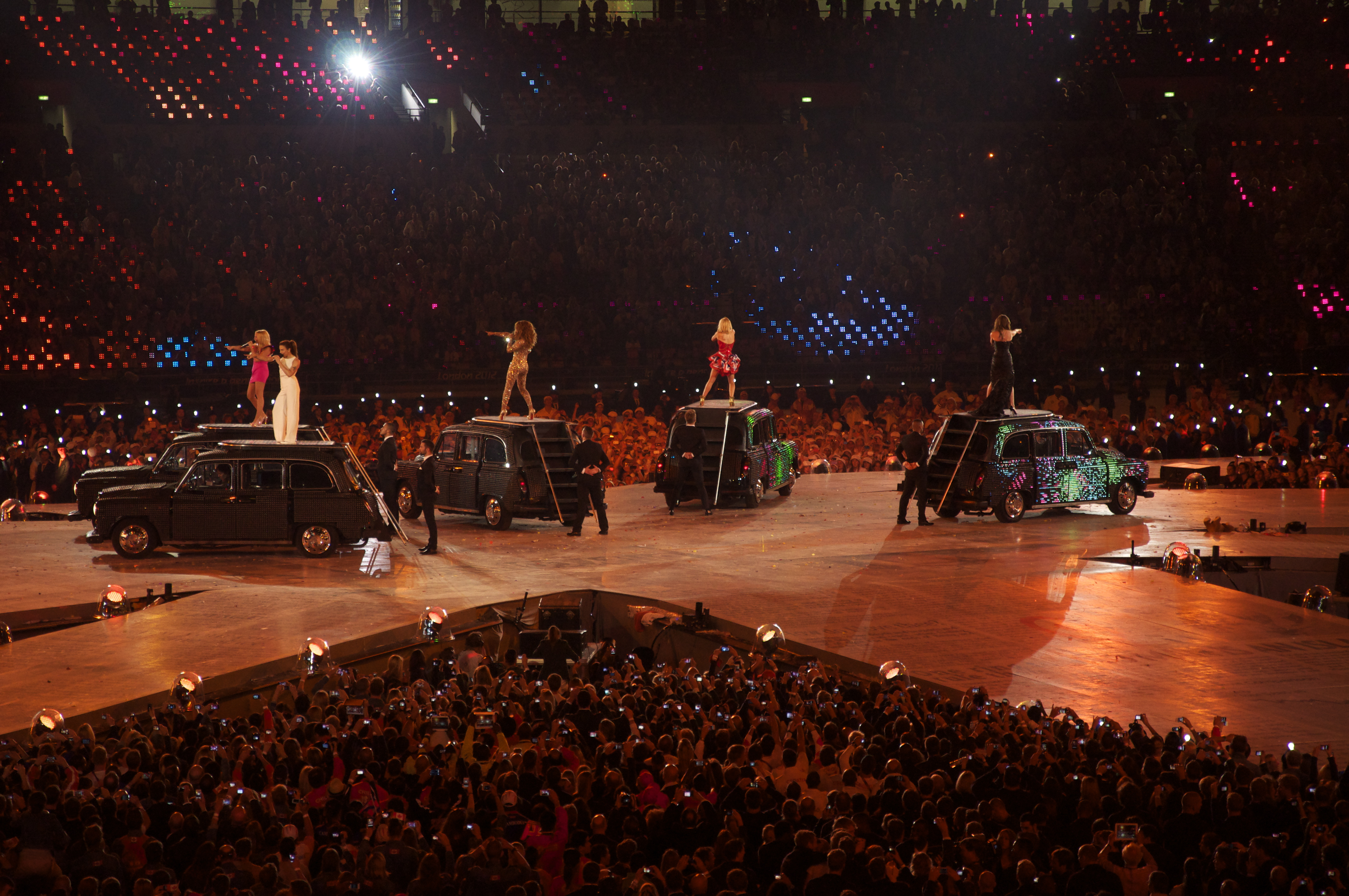
The Spice Girls performing "Spice Up Your Life" on 12 August 2012, standing on the roofs of London cabs at the London Stadium for the Summer Olympics closing ceremony.

"Spice Up Your Life" had its television premiere in the UK on 27 September 1997, on the BBC's The National Lottery Live programme, which attracted more than nine million viewers. The song was subsequently performed many times on television, including Top of the Pops, An Audience with..., All That, Hit Machine, and MuchMusic's Intimate and Interactive. The Spice Girls have performed the song in several award ceremonies throughout 1997, including the Smash Hits Poll Winners Party, the MTV Europe Music Awards, the Premios Amigo, the Premios Ondas the Billboard Music Awards, and the Channel V Music Awards. In October 1997, the group performed "Spice Up Your Life" as the eleventh song of their first live concert at the Abdi İpekçi Arena in Istanbul, Turkey. The performance was broadcast on Showtime in a pay-per-view concert special titled Spice Girls in Concert: Wild!, and was later included in the VHS and DVD release Girl Power! Live in Istanbul.

The group performed the song in November 1997, as part of their setlist for the Two Nations in Concert charity event held in Johannesburg, South Africa, presented by the Nations Trust foundation. The song was also used during the final segment of their 1997 film, Spice World. In the scene, the group performed it at London's Royal Albert Hall, surrounded by the media and thousands of fans, while the rest of the supporting cast can be seen dancing and singing during the show. At the 2000 Brit Awards, the group performed "Spice Up Your Life" at the end of the show as part of their setlist for winning the award for Outstanding Contribution to Music. The Spice Girls performed the song on 12 August 2012 at the Summer Olympics closing ceremony in London in a medley with "Wannabe". They arrived onstage on glittering London cabs decorated with their individual trademark emblems. During the event, they ascended onto the roofs of the cabs and proceeded to race around the stadium whilst singing and dancing.

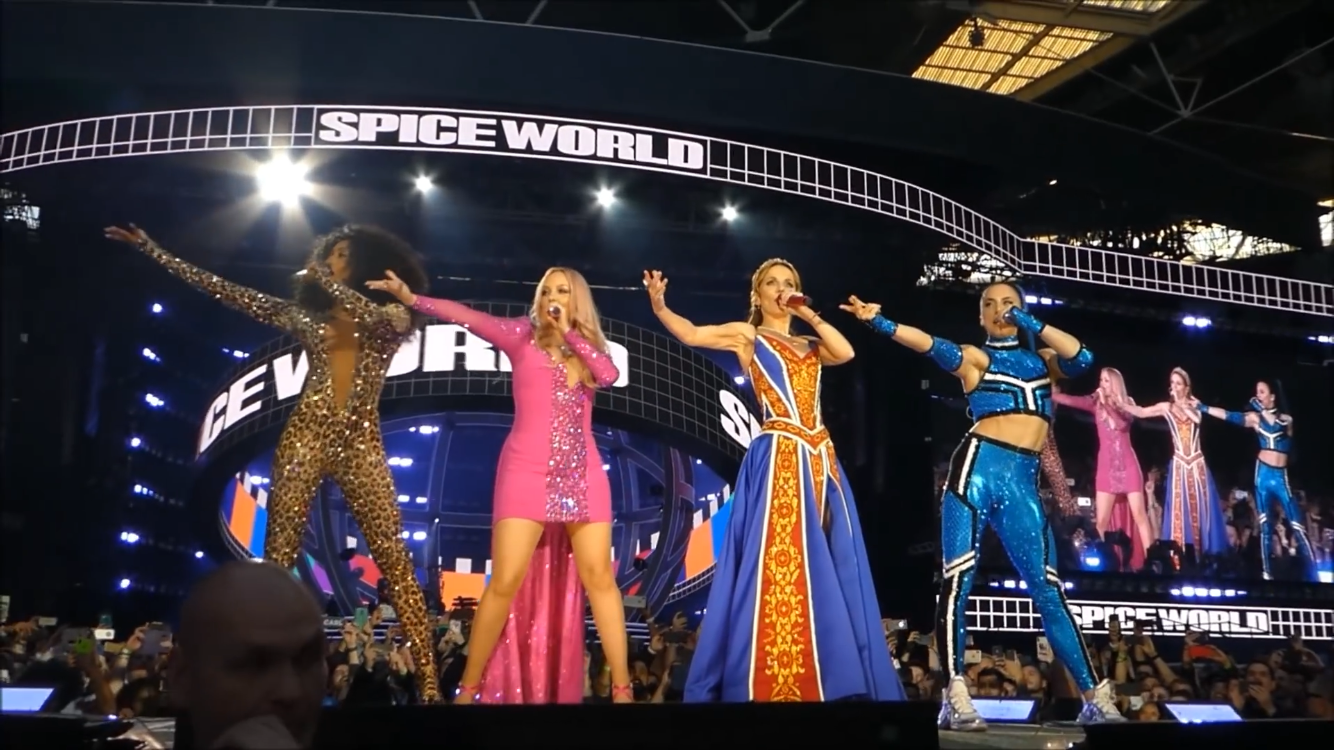
The Spice Girls wearing updated versions of their signature outfits while performing "Spice Up Your Life" on the Spice World – 2019 Tour at Wembley Stadium in June 2019.

The Spice Girls have performed the song on their four tours, the Spiceworld Tour, the Christmas in Spiceworld Tour, the Return of the Spice Girls Tour, and the Spice World – 2019 Tour. For the Spiceworld Tour, during their performance of "Spice Up Your Life", the group dressed in re-imagined outfits of the group's signature look, designed by British stylist Kenny Ho. The performance at the tour's final concert can be found on the video: Spice Girls Live at Wembley Stadium, filmed in London, on 20 September 1998, and released on VHS around two months later. In the Return of the Spice Girls Tour (2007–2008), the group performed "Spice Up Your Life" as the opening song of the show. It started with the screens above the stage displaying an introductory film, which featured five little girls—Spice Girls' look-alikes—opening a magic box, dancing and talking about their wish to be world-famous. Old headlines about them flash up—the last one announcing the end of the group. Then the group appeared standing motionless in five ascending platforms, dressed in tight bronze and copper coloured outfits made by Italian fashion designer Roberto Cavalli. During the encore, the group closed the show performing a remix version of the song, each dressed in a glittery outfit of a different colour. At the end, a cannon exploded showering the stage with pieces of paper strips, while flags from different countries flashed across the backdrop screens. As they left the stage, the words "Mission accomplished" appeared on the screens. For the Spice World – 2019 Tour, the group performed it as the opening song of the show. Each member dressed in updated versions of their 90s looks, designed by Gabriella Slade, including Brown in a leopard print catsuit, and a floor-length gown adaptation of Halliwell's 1997 Union Jack dress.

== Formats and track listings ==
- UK/European/Taiwanese CD1, Italian/Japanese/South African/Thai/US CD
1. "Spice Up Your Life" (Stent Radio Mix) – 2:53
2. "Spice Up Your Life" (Morales Radio Mix) – 2:48
3. "Spice Up Your Life" (Stent Radio Instrumental) – 2:53
4. "Spice Invaders" – 3:38
- UK/European/Taiwanese CD2, Australian/Brazilian CD
1. "Spice Up Your Life" (Stent Radio Mix) – 2:53
2. "Spice Up Your Life" (Murk Cuba Libre Mix) – 8:05
3. "Spice Up Your Life" (Morales Carnival Club Mix) – 11:30
- European 2-track/French CD
1. "Spice Up Your Life" (Stent Radio Mix) – 2:53
2. "Spice Invaders" – 3:38
- Digital EP 1
1. "Spice Up Your Life" (Morales Radio Mix) – 2:50
2. "Spice Up Your Life" (Murk Spider Beats) – 3:42
3. "Spice Up Your Life" (Murk Cuba Libre Mix) – 8:06
4. "Spice Up Your Life" (Murk Sugar Cane Dub) – 8:40
5. "Spice Up Your Life" (Morales Drums & Dub Mix) – 11:09
- Digital EP 2
1. "Spice Up Your Life" (Stent Radio Mix) – 2:55
2. "Spice Up Your Life" (Morales Carnival Club Mix) – 11:30
3. "Spice Up Your Life" (Morales Beats) – 5:53
4. "Spice Invaders" – 3:38
5. "Spice Up Your Life" (Stent Radio Instrumental) – 2:54
- UK/Australian/US Cassette (Side 2 is the same as Side 1)
1. A1: "Spice Up Your Life" (Stent Radio Mix) – 2:53
2. A2: "Spice Up Your Life" (Morales Radio Mix) – 2:48
3. A3: "Spice Up Your Life" (Stent Radio Instrumental) – 2:53
4. A4: "Spice Invaders" – 3:38
- UK 12"
1. A1: "Spice Up Your Life" (Morales Carnival Club Mix) – 11:30
2. B1: "Spice Up Your Life" (Murk Cuba Libre Mix) – 8:05
3. B2: "Spice Up Your Life" (Morales Beats) – 5:51
4. C1: "Spice Up Your Life" (Morales Drums & Dub Mix) – 11:07
5. D1: "Spice Up Your Life" (Murk Sugar Cane Dub) – 8:38
6. D2: "Spice Up Your Life" (Murk Spider Beats) – 3:41
- US 12"
1. A1: "Spice Up Your Life" (Morales Carnival Club Mix) – 11:30
2. A2: "Spice Up Your Life" (Murk Cuba Libre Mix) – 8:05
3. B1: "Spice Up Your Life" (Stent Radio Mix) – 2:53
4. B2: "Spice Up Your Life" (Stent Radio Instrumental) – 2:53
5. B3: "Spice Up Your Life" (Morales Radio Mix) – 2:48
- US Promotional CD-R (Remixed By Ralphi Rosario)
1. "Spice Up Your Life" (Vocal Mix) – 9:08
2. "Spice Up Your Life" (Dub) – 8:36
3. "Spice Up Your Life" (Radio Edit) – 3:38

== Credits and personnel ==
Credits of "Spice Up Your Life" adapted from the booklet of Spiceworld:

- Spice Girls – lyrics, vocals
- Matt Rowe – lyrics, producer, keyboards and programming
- Richard Stannard – lyrics, producer
- Adrian Bushby – recording engineer
- Mark "Spike" Stent – audio mixing
- Paul "P. Dub" Walton – assistant
- Pete Davis – additional programming
- Jake Davies – additional engineering

Credits of the b-side and the remixes adapted from the liner notes of the "Spice Up Your Life" CD singles UK CD1, UK CD2, UK 12" single and US promotional CD-R:

"Spice Invaders"

- Spice Girls – lyrics, vocals
- Absolute – lyrics, production
- Jeremy Wheatley – audio mixing

"Murk Cuba Libre Mix", "Sugar Cane Dub" and "Spider Beats"

- Murk – remixing
- Cesar Soobe – recording engineer
- Leo Herrera – assistant
- Ed Calle – flute
- Arana – percussion
- Paquito Hechavarría – piano
- Lester Mendez – programming
- Oscar Gaeton – additional production
- Ralph Falcon – additional production

"Stent Radio Mix" and "Radio Instrumental"

- Mark "Spike" Stent – audio mixing

"Morales Radio Mix", "Carnival Club Mix", "Beats" and "Drums and Dub Mix"

- David Morales – producer, remixing
- Dave 'EQ3' Sussman – recording engineer
- Bashiri Johnson – percussion
- Joey Moskowitz – keyboards programming
- Alec Shantzis – keyboards programming

"Vocal Mix", "Dub" and "Radio Edit"

- Ralphi Rosario – programming, remixing
- Craig J. Snider – programming, remixing
- Mark B. Christensen – mastering
- Peter Nelson – executive producer

== Charts ==
=== Weekly charts ===
1997–1998 weekly chart performance for "Spice Up Your Life"
Chart (1997–1998)	Peak position
Australia (ARIA)	8
Austria (Ö3 Austria Top 40)	12
Belgium (Ultratop 50 Flanders)	4
Belgium (Ultratop 50 Wallonia)	2
Canada (Canadian Singles Chart)	2
Canada Top Singles (RPM)	17
Canada Dance/Urban (RPM)	8
Denmark (Tracklisten)	2
Estonia (Eesti Top 20)	1
Europe (Eurochart Hot 100 Singles)	3
Finland (Suomen virallinen lista)	2
France (SNEP)	3
Germany (GfK)	14
Hungary (MAHASZ)	1
Iceland (Íslenski Listinn Topp 40)	1
Ireland (IRMA)	2
Italy (Musica e dischi)	3
Italy Airplay (Music & Media)	1
Latvia (Latvijas Top 20)	2
Netherlands (Dutch Top 40)	2
Netherlands (Single Top 100)	4
New Zealand (Recorded Music NZ)	2
Norway (VG-lista)	3
Romania (Romanian Top 100)	1
Scottish Singles Sales (Official Charts)	1
Spain (AFYVE)	2
Sweden (Sverigetopplistan)	2
Switzerland (Schweizer Hitparade)	5
Taiwan (RIT)	4
UK Singles (Official Charts)	1
UK Airplay (Music Week)	2
US Billboard Hot 100	18
US Dance Club Songs (Billboard)	4
US Dance Singles Sales (Billboard)	22
US Pop Airplay (Billboard)	37
US Rhythmic Airplay (Billboard)	27
US CHR/Pop (Radio & Records)	41
US CHR/Rhythmic (Radio & Records)	29

2012 weekly chart performance for "Spice Up Your Life"
Chart (2012)	Peak position
UK Singles (Official Charts)	95

=== Year-end charts ===
1997 year-end chart performance for "Spice Up Your Life"
Chart (1997)	Position
Australia (ARIA)	36
Belgium (Ultratop 50 Flanders)	25
Belgium (Ultratop 50 Wallonia)	17
Europe (Eurochart Hot 100 Singles)	16
France (SNEP)	23
Iceland (Íslenski Listinn Topp 40)	28
Netherlands (Dutch Top 40)	34
Netherlands (Single Top 100)	31
New Zealand (RIANZ)	35
Norway (VG-lista)	18
Romania (Romanian Top 100)	22
Sweden (Topplistan)	9
UK Singles (OCC)	9

1998 year-end chart performance for "Spice Up Your Life"
Chart (1998)	Position
US Billboard Hot 100	81

== Certifications ==
Certifications and sales for "Spice Up Your Life"
Region	Certification	Certified units/sales
Australia (ARIA)	Platinum	70,000^{^}
Belgium (BRMA)	Platinum	50,000^{*}
France (SNEP)	Gold	250,000^{*}
Netherlands (NVPI)	Gold	50,000^{^}
New Zealand (RMNZ)	Gold	15,000^{‡}
Sweden (GLF)	Platinum	30,000^{^}
United Kingdom (BPI)	2× Platinum	1,336,000
United States (RIAA)	Gold	500,000^{^}
^{*} Sales figures based on certification alone.^{^} Shipments figures based on certification alone.^{‡} Sales+streaming figures based on certification alone.

== Release history ==
Release dates and formats for "Spice Up Your Life"
Region	Date	Format(s)	Label(s)	Ref.
France	3 October 1997	CD; maxi CD	EMI	
Germany	6 October 1997	Maxi CD	EMI	
United Kingdom	13 October 1997	Cassette; two maxi CDs	Virgin	
United States	21 October 1997	12-inch vinyl; cassette; maxi CD	Virgin	
Japan	22 October 1997	Maxi CD	Toshiba EMI	

== Bibliography ==
- Beckham, Victoria (2001). Learning to Fly. Penguin Books Ltd. ISBN 978-0-141-00394-8.
- Brown, Melanie (2002). Catch a Fire: The Autobiography. Headline Book Publishing. ISBN 0-7553-1063-2.
- Cripps, Rebecca; Peachey, Mal; Spice Girls (1997). Real Life: Real Spice: The Official Story. Zone/Chameleon Books. ISBN 0-233-99299-5.
- Halliwell, Geri (1999). If Only. Delacorte Press. ISBN 0-385-33475-3.
- Kutner, Jon; Leigh, Spencer (2005). "Ch. 5: 1990-1999: 775 – The Spice Girls: Spice Up Your Life". 1000 UK Number One Hits. Omnibus Press. ISBN 1-84449-283-4.
- Sinclair, David (2008). Spice Girls Revisited (2nd ed.). Omnibus Press. ISBN 978-1-84609-068-4.
- Spice Girls (1997). Spice World: The Movie. Three Rivers Press. ISBN 0-609-80338-7.
- Spice Girls (2008). Spice Girls Greatest Hits (Piano/Vocal/Guitar) Artist Songbook. Hal Leonard Corporation. ISBN 978-1-4234-3688-1.
