= Ugenia Lavender =

Fictional character in a children's novel series

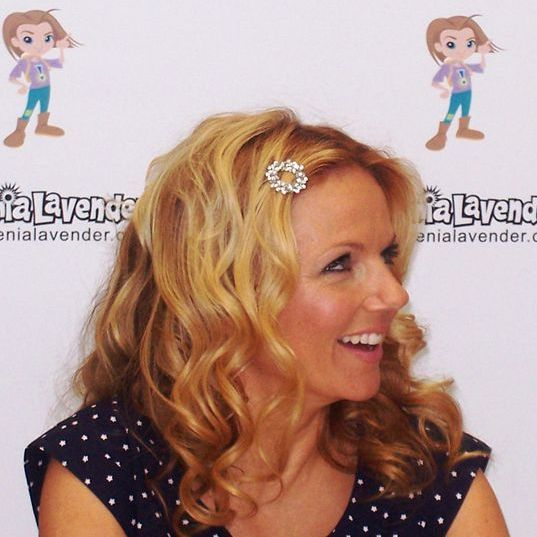
Halliwell at a booksigning for Ugenia Lavender

Ugenia Lavender is the title character in a series of children's novels written by Geri Halliwell, who achieved fame as a member of the Spice Girls and as a solo singer-songwriter before deciding to pursue a career as an author. Halliwell began writing the books in 2004. Macmillan Children's Books announced that Halliwell had signed a contract to write six books featuring the character on 12 April 2007.

== Books ==
- Ugenia Lavender: The First Book (2 May 2008)
- Ugenia Lavender and the Terrible Tiger (6 June 2008)
- Ugenia Lavender and the Burning Pants (4 July 2008)
- Ugenia Lavender: Home Alone (1 August 2008)
- Ugenia Lavender and the Temple of Gloom (5 September 2008)
- Ugenia Lavender: The One and Only (3 October 2008).

== Story ==
The books follow the adventures of nine year old Ugenia, a character based on Halliwell, alongside her friends Bronte, Rudy and Trevor. Other characters are said by Halliwell to be loosely based on Gordon Ramsay, George Michael, Marilyn Monroe, Vincent van Gogh, Wayne Rooney and the character Justin Suarez from the TV series Ugly Betty. The character Princess Posh Vattoria, a caricature of Victoria Beckham, was featured in early drafts but has not appeared in the book series.

Each title will feature a newsletter from Ugenia highlighting lessons she has learned, along with quizzes, riddles and crosswords, and will be available in an audio book edition read by Halliwell.

The books are illustrated by Rian Hughes. Children's author Jonny Zucker is also given a special credit on the books, but Halliwell has maintained she wrote the books entirely on her own.

== Promotion ==
Promotional activities for the series included a launch reading by Halliwell at London Zoo on 27 April 2008 and a seven city UK and Ireland book tour planned in 2008. Halliwell recorded a theme tune for use in advertisements for the books.

== Reception ==
A review in the Liverpool Echo described the first book as "eminently readable and exciting". The children's book reviewer in The Observer said it was "good fun" but criticised the quality of the prose.

== Sales ==
According to the official site, the book sold more than 250,000 copies in its first five months which made Halliwell 2008's most successful female celebrity children's author.
