= Who Do You Think You Are (Spice Girls song) =

1997 single by the Spice Girls

Single by Spice Girls

from the album Spice
- A-side: "Mama"
- Released: 3 March 1997
- Recorded: 1996
- Studio: Olympic (London, England)
- Genre: Dance-pop; funk; nu-disco
- Length: 3:44 (radio edit); 3:59 (album version)
- Label: Virgin
- Songwriters: Spice Girls; Andy Watkins; Paul Wilson
- Producer: Absolute

Spice Girls singles chronology
"2 Become 1" (1996)	"Mama" / "Who Do You Think You Are" (1997)	"Spice Up Your Life" (1997)

Music video
- "Who Do You Think You Are" on YouTube

"Who Do You Think You Are" is a song performed by British pop group Spice Girls. It was written by the group members with Paul Wilson and Andy Watkins—also known as Absolute—for the group's debut album Spice, released in November 1996. The song is heavily influenced by early 1990s dance-pop, and has a nu-disco-style beat that resembles the music of the late 1970s. Its lyrics are about the superstar life, and how someone can get trapped in the world of fame.

In February 1997, the group opened the Brit Awards with "Who Do You Think You Are". The Union Jack dress that Geri Halliwell wore during the performance made the front page of various newspapers, and is now remembered as one of the most iconic symbols of Cool Britannia. "Who Do You Think You Are" became the official single of the 1997 Comic Relief. A video, directed by Greg Masuak, featuring the Sugar Lumps—a satirical version of the group—was released to help raise money for charitable causes and donated all the proceedings from the single.

"Who Do You Think You Are" was a commercial and critical success, with Melanie Chisholm's vocals receiving praise from pop music critics. Released with "Mama" as a double A-side single in March 1997, it became the group's fourth consecutive single to top the UK Singles Chart, making them the first act in UK chart history to have its first four singles reach number one. Additionally, it was certified platinum by the British Phonographic Industry (BPI), and performed well internationally, reaching the top ten in many European countries and New Zealand, and the top twenty in Australia, France, and Norway.

== Background ==
In December 1994, the Spice Girls persuaded their former managers—father-and-son team Bob and Chris Herbert—to set up a showcase in front of industry writers, producers and A&R men at the Nomis Studios in Shepherd's Bush, London. Among the attendees was BMG Publishing's Mark Fox, former percussionist of the 1980s new wave band Haircut One Hundred. Since the showcase, Fox was unofficially helping the group to get contacts in the business. In May 1995, he introduced the group to Paul Wilson and Andy Watkins—the songwriters and production duo known as Absolute. Fox phoned the duo and told them: "You won't believe it, but I've got your act. They've just walked in the door. They're beautiful, everything you've been looking for. I'll bring them down straight away."

Watkins remembers the first time they saw the group: "I saw Mark Fox. And then I saw these little girls skipping and running around. And they looked about thirteen. This can't be them. No way!". Nevertheless, the Spice Girls managed to impress them. They played a few of their tracks, but neither Watkins nor Wilson particularly liked them, except for a song the group wrote with Richard Stannard and Matt Rowe, called "Feed Your Love", which the duo thought was "dark and cool". A songwriting session was booked within the next days.

== Writing and recording ==
The songwriting session—held at Absolute's studio located on Tagg's Island near Chertsey—did not seem to go well at the beginning, as the duo was heavily into R&B music at the time, while the group according to Wilson was "always very poptastic". After two sessions the duo phoned their managers and told them that the musical association between them and the group was not working. At this point, the duo heard "Wannabe" for the first time, Wilson remembers: "We listen to it, and we didn't get it at all. It was so different to what we were doing. We thought, 'How's this gonna work? We're not the right people to be doing this band.'" For the next session the group wanted to write something uptempo and a bit more fun. A full-on disco backing track came up, and "Who Do You Think You Are" evolved from there. Wilson commented about that session:

The thing is when they wrote they were also writing the dance routine, constructing the video, all at the same time as writing the song. And that's when the penny dropped. They say that the mother of invention is copying somebody and getting it wrong. Their sound was actually not getting R&B quite right.

"Who Do You Think You Are" and three other tracks written by the group and Absolute appeared on the Spice album. The songs were produced and recorded for the most part at Olympic Studios in Barnes, London. At this time, the autotune facility was not available and most of the vocals were recorded with few adjustments made afterwards, as Wilson remembers: "Because of the fact we were not using computers, we had to work them very hard. They were in that recording booth for hours because we just had to get the right take".

== Composition ==
Who Do You Think You Are
A 25-second sample of the song. Adams and Brown trades lines during the second verse, while Chisholm's vocals are prominently featured during the pre-chorus.

"Who Do You Think You Are" is an uptempo dance-pop song, with influences of the early '90s Europop, and a disco–style beat that resembles the music of the late '70s. It is written in the key of F♯ minor, with a time signature set on common time, and moves at a fast tempo of 120 beats per minute.

The song is constructed in a verse-pre-chorus-chorus form, with a bridge before the third and final chorus. It starts with an instrumental introduction, with a simple chord progression of F♯m_{7}–G♯m_{7}, that is also used during the verses. In the first verse, Geri Halliwell and Emma Bunton trade lines in a wry manner, then the chord progression changes to G_{7}–Bm–G_{7}–Bm–G_{7}–F♯m_{7} during the pre-chorus, which features Melanie Chisholm's vocals prominently. After the chorus, the same pattern occurs leading to the second chorus, with Victoria Beckham and Melanie Brown singing the second verse. Then the group sings the bridge, the pre-chorus, and repeats the chorus until the song gradually fades out, while Chisholm adds the high harmony—"Swing it, shake it, move it, make it".

The inspiration for the lyrics comes from some of the people the group met in the music industry, and are about the presumptuous superstar life, and how someone can get trapped in the world of fame, much like the Temptations' 1971 classic "Superstar (Remember How You Got Where You Are)".

== Reception ==
=== Critical response ===
"Who Do You Think You Are" was generally well received by contemporary music critics. In a review of the group's debut album Spice, Chuck Campbell of the Star-News said it is "a slamming dance song". Daniel Incognito of Sputnikmusic said that with a "dynamite chorus harmonising the girls voices, 'Who Do You Think You Are' still feels relevant today", he added that "each girl excels in their solo-lines", and believed that Chisholm "provides [a] delicious contrast with her loud and spirited lines". The Daily Mirror called the song "a full-on disco number which would get to No. 1 even if it wasn't by Spice Girls and even if they weren't giving all the money to Comic Relief".

Melissa Ruggieri of the Richmond Times-Dispatch criticised the track, referring to it as "a quick blast of vapid fluff". AllMusic's Jason Elias complimented Chisholm's vocals and called her "the star of the show". He also said that "Who Do You Think You Are" was "one of their strongest and underrated songs", adding that it was "proof that the Spice Girls often had more savvy distilling different genres and styles than their American counterparts". In a review of the group's 2007 compilation album Greatest Hits, Talia Kraines of BBC Music called it "their piece de resistance [...][that] still manages to fill dancefloors". Dave Fawbert from ShortList noted it as "a perfect little funky, soulful pop song".

=== Chart performance ===
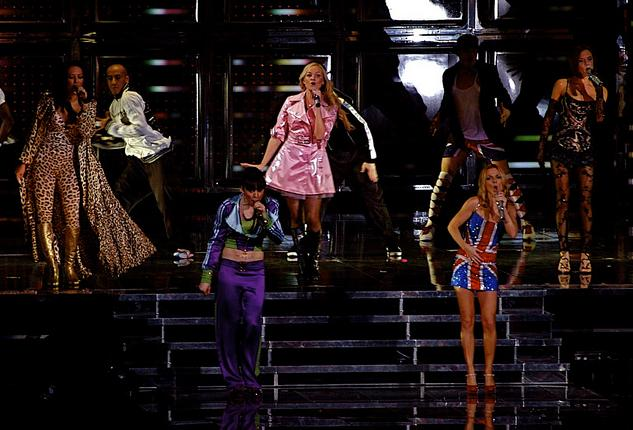
The group performing "Who Do You Think You Are" at the Air Canada Centre in Toronto, during the Return of the Spice Girls tour, wearing remakes of their signature outfits.

"Who Do You Think You Are" was released in the UK as a double A-side single with "Mama" on 3 March 1997. It debuted on the UK Singles Chart at number one, with sales of 248,000 copies, becoming the group's fourth consecutive chart-topper. This made the Spice Girls the first act in UK chart history to have its first four singles reach number one, breaking the record set by Gerry & The Pacemakers, Frankie Goes to Hollywood, Jive Bunny and the Mastermixers and Robson & Jerome with three number ones each. It spent three weeks at number one, nine weeks in the top forty, fifteen weeks in the top seventy-five, and sold 786,000 copies as of May 2019, earning a platinum certification by the British Phonographic Industry (BPI).

"Who Do You Think You Are" was commercially successful in Europe. It peaked at number three on the Eurochart Hot 100, and performed similarly in other European charts. It became the group's third number-one single in Ireland, and peaked inside the top ten in Belgium (both the Flemish and French charts), Germany, the Netherlands, Sweden, and Switzerland. In France, "Who Do You Think You Are" was released as a standalone single in June 1997. It debuted and peaked at number sixteen, and stayed ten weeks on the chart. In December 1997, it was certified silver by the Syndicat National de l'Édition Phonographique (SNEP).

In New Zealand, it debuted on 23 March 1997 at number ten, while their three first singles were slowly descending from the chart. It peaked at number six and stayed fifteen weeks on the chart. In Australia, it did not perform as well as their previous releases. In July 1997, it debuted on the singles chart at number thirteen, but was unable to reach a higher position and dropped off the chart after fourteen weeks.

== Music video ==
The Spice Girls and the Sugar Lumps in a scene of the second version of the "Who Do You Think You Are" video, created for the 1997 Comic Relief telethon

The music video for "Who Do You Think You Are" was directed in February 1997 by Greg Masuak, and filmed in a theatre located in the north of London. There are two edited versions of the video: the original version and the director's cut. It features the Spice Girls singing and dancing solo in front of various colourful backgrounds whilst filmed with a Steadicam. Other scenes show the group performing on a stage in front of an energetic crowd. In addition, there are many background performers doing unusual tricks. Chisholm wrote about the shoot: "We shot the video for 'Who Do You Think You Are' in a really mad club—a real dive. The toilets were horrible and we had to have our make-up done in a Winnebago. The vibe was excellent, though—I think it was my favourite video because it was such good fun. I felt like a proper pop star. [...] It was just how you imagine it when you're young".

A third version of the video (known as the Sugar Lumps version), which adds the Sugar Lumps—a satirical version of the Spice Girls played by Kathy Burke, Dawn French, Llewella Gideon, Lulu, and Jennifer Saunders—was filmed for the "Red Nose Day" of the 1997 Comic Relief, one of the two high-profile telethon events held in the United Kingdom. The video starts with the Sugar Lumps as schoolgirls dreaming of becoming Spice Girls, and ends with them joining the group on stage, while dancing and lip-synching the song. Halliwell commented about the shoot: "The women were all really warm and funny and nice. The freakiest thing about it was seeing Jennifer Saunders. She looked just like me and everyone said they thought she was me. It was absolutely bizarre–the make-up, everything. It was scary–like, do I really do that?".

== Live performances ==
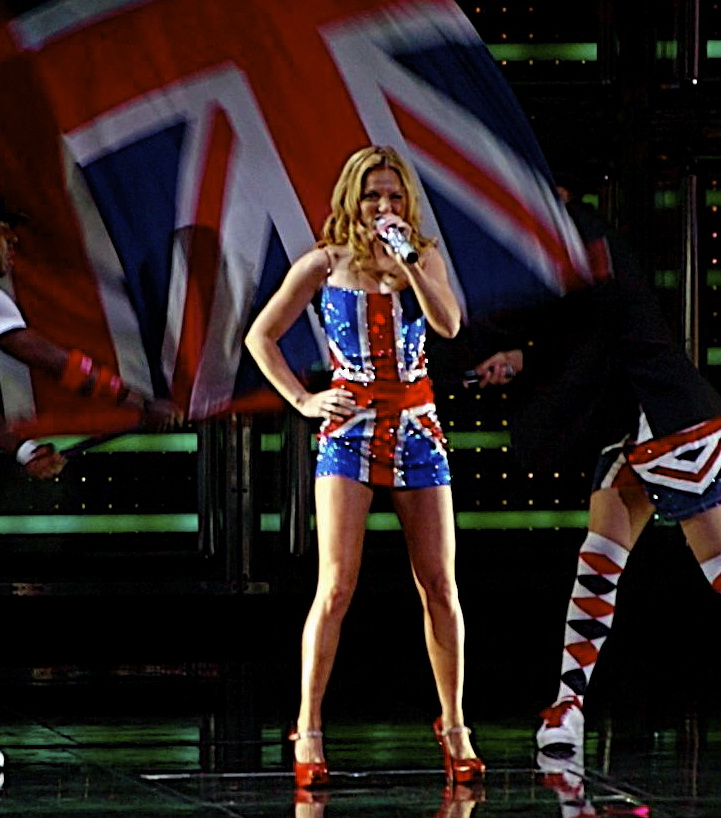
Halliwell, performing "Who Do You Think You Are" at the Air Canada Centre in Toronto, wearing the Union Jack dress remake, designed by Roberto Cavalli.

The song was performed on television in both the UK and Continental Europe, including An Audience with..., Top of the Pops, the Bravo Supershow, the 1997 Royal Variety Performance, and the "Red Nose Day" of the 1997 Comic Relief—alongside the Sugar Lumps.

In February 1997, the group performed it at the 1997 Brit Awards. They started rehearsals a few days after they returned to the UK from a promotional tour in the US, with choreographer Priscilla Samuels, who worked with the group on Fuller's recommendation. On 24 February 1997, in front of a thousand VIPs at the Earls Court Exhibition Centre, the group opened the show with a lip-synched rendition of "Who Do You Think You Are". Halliwell's outfit, a black coloured mini dress emblazoned with a Union Jack on the front and a white peace symbol on the back, made the front page of various newspapers, and is now remembered as one of the most iconic symbols of Cool Britannia. For the Return of the Spice Girls, Italian fashion designer Roberto Cavalli designed Halliwell a new Union Jack dress modelled on the original. The new version appeared slightly longer and the flag was made out of rhinestones and Swarovski crystals. Thirteen years later, at the 2010 Brit Awards, the group's "Who Do You Think You Are" performance won the Most Memorable Performance award of the BRITS last thirty years.

In October 1997, the group performed it as the second song of their first live concert at the Abdi İpekçi Arena in Istanbul, Turkey. The performance was broadcast on Showtime in a pay-per-view event titled Spice Girls in Concert Wild!, and was later included in the VHS and DVD release Girl Power! Live in Istanbul. The Spice Girls have performed the song on their four tours, the Spiceworld Tour, the Christmas in Spiceworld Tour, the Return of the Spice Girls Tour and the Spice World – 2019 Tour. The performance at the Spiceworld Tour's final concert can be found on the video: Spice Girls Live at Wembley Stadium, filmed in London, on 20 September 1998. It remained in the group's live set after Halliwell's departure. The first verse had originally been sung by Halliwell with Bunton. After Halliwell's departure, her parts were taken by Chisholm on the Spiceworld Tour, and by Brown on the Christmas in Spiceworld Tour. In 2019 during Spice World – 2019 Tour Geri sang absent Victoria's original lines.

== Formats and track listings ==
- UK, European and Australian CD2; Brazilian and South African CD; digital EP 2
1. "Who Do You Think You Are" (radio version) – 3:44
2. "Mama" (radio version) – 3:40
3. "Who Do You Think You Are" (Morales club mix) – 9:30
4. "Who Do You Think You Are" (Morales dub mix) – 7:00
- French CD
1. "Who Do You Think You Are" (radio version) – 3:44
2. "Who Do You Think You Are" (instrumental) – 3:44
- Italian 12-inch vinyl single
1. A1: "Who Do You Think You Are" (Morales club mix) – 9:30
2. A2: "Who Do You Think You Are" (Morales bonus mix) – 4:40
3. B1: "Mama" (album version) – 5:03
4. B2: "Who Do You Think You Are" (Morales club dub) – 7:00

== Credits and personnel ==
- Spice Girls – lead vocals, lyrics
- Absolute – lyrics, production, all instruments
- Dave Way – audio mixing
- Jeremy Wheatley – recording engineer
- Adam Brown – assistant
- Mary Pearce – additional background vocals

Published by Windswept Pacific Music Ltd, 19 Music and BMG Music Publishing Ltd.

== Charts ==
All entries charted with "Mama" unless otherwise noted.

=== Weekly charts ===
Weekly chart performance for "Who Do You Think You Are"
Chart (1997)	Peak position
Australia (ARIA)	13
Belgium (Ultratop 50 Flanders)	10
Belgium (Ultratop 50 Wallonia)	7
Estonia (Eesti Top 20)	3
Estonia Airplay (Eesti Top 25)	4
Europe (Eurochart Hot 100)	3
France (SNEP)	16
Germany (GfK)	4
Hungary (Mahasz)	8
Iceland (Íslenski Listinn Topp 40) "Who Do You Think You Are" only	13
Ireland (IRMA)	1
Israel (IBA)	3
Italy (Musica e dischi)	12
Italy Airplay (Music & Media) "Who Do You Think You Are" only	1
Netherlands (Dutch Top 40)	2
Netherlands (Single Top 100)	3
New Zealand (Recorded Music NZ)	6
Norway (VG-lista)	12
Scottish Singles Sales (Official Charts)	1
Sweden (Sverigetopplistan)	5
Switzerland (Schweizer Hitparade)	6
UK Singles (Official Charts)	1
UK Airplay (Music Week)	1

=== Year-end charts ===
Year-end chart performance for "Who Do You Think You Are"
Chart (1997)	Position
Australia (ARIA)	95
Belgium (Ultratop 50 Flanders)	46
Belgium (Ultratop 50 Wallonia)	28
Europe (Eurochart Hot 100)	22
Germany (Media Control)	46
Netherlands (Single Top 100)	30
New Zealand (RIANZ)	44
Sweden (Topplistan)	33
Switzerland (Schweizer Hitparade)	31
UK Singles (OCC)	15
UK Airplay (Music Week)	28

== Certifications ==
Certifications and sales for "Who Do You Think You Are"
Region	Certification	Certified units/sales
Belgium (BRMA)	Gold	25,000^{*}
France (SNEP)	Gold	250,000^{*}
Germany (BVMI)	Gold	250,000^{^}
Netherlands (NVPI)	Gold	50,000^{^}
New Zealand (RMNZ)	Gold	15,000^{‡}
Sweden (GLF)	Gold	15,000^{^}
United Kingdom (BPI)	Platinum	786,000
^{*} Sales figures based on certification alone.^{^} Shipments figures based on certification alone.^{‡} Sales+streaming figures based on certification alone.

== Release history ==
Release dates and formats for "Who Do You Think You Are" (Note: In Germany, Japan and the United Kingdom, "Who Do You Think You Are" was released as a double A-side single with "Mama".)
Region	Date	Format(s)	Label(s)	Ref.
Germany	3 March 1997	Maxi CD	EMI	
United Kingdom	3 March 1997	Cassette; two maxi CDs	Virgin	
Japan	16 April 1997	Maxi CD	Toshiba EMI	
Germany	25 April 1997	Maxi CD (limited)	EMI	
France	27 June 1997	CD (Note: In France, "Who Do You Think You Are" was released as a standalone single, without "Mama".)	EMI	

== Bibliography ==
- Brown, Melanie (2002). Catch a Fire: The Autobiography. Headline Book Publishing. ISBN 0-7553-1063-2.
- Cripps, Rebecca; Peachey, Mal; Spice Girls (1997). Real Life: Real Spice The Official Story. Zone/Chameleon Books. ISBN 0-233-99299-5.
- De Ribera Berenguer, Juan (1997). Colección: Ídolos del Pop-Spice Girls (in Spanish). Editorial La Máscara. ISBN 84-7974-236-4.
- McGibbon, Rob (1997). Spice Power: The Inside Story. Macmillan Publishers Ltd. ISBN 0-7522-1142-0.
- Sinclair, David (2004). Wannabe: How the Spice Girls Reinvented Pop Fame. Omnibus Press. ISBN 0-7119-8643-6.
- Spice Girls (1997). Girl Power!. Zone/Chameleon Books. ISBN 0-233-99165-4.
- Spice Girls (2008). Spice Girls Greatest Hits (Piano/Vocal/Guitar) Artist Songbook. Hal Leonard Corporation. ISBN 978-1-4234-3688-1.
