= Geri Halliwell =

English singer (born 1972)

Geri Halliwell-Horner
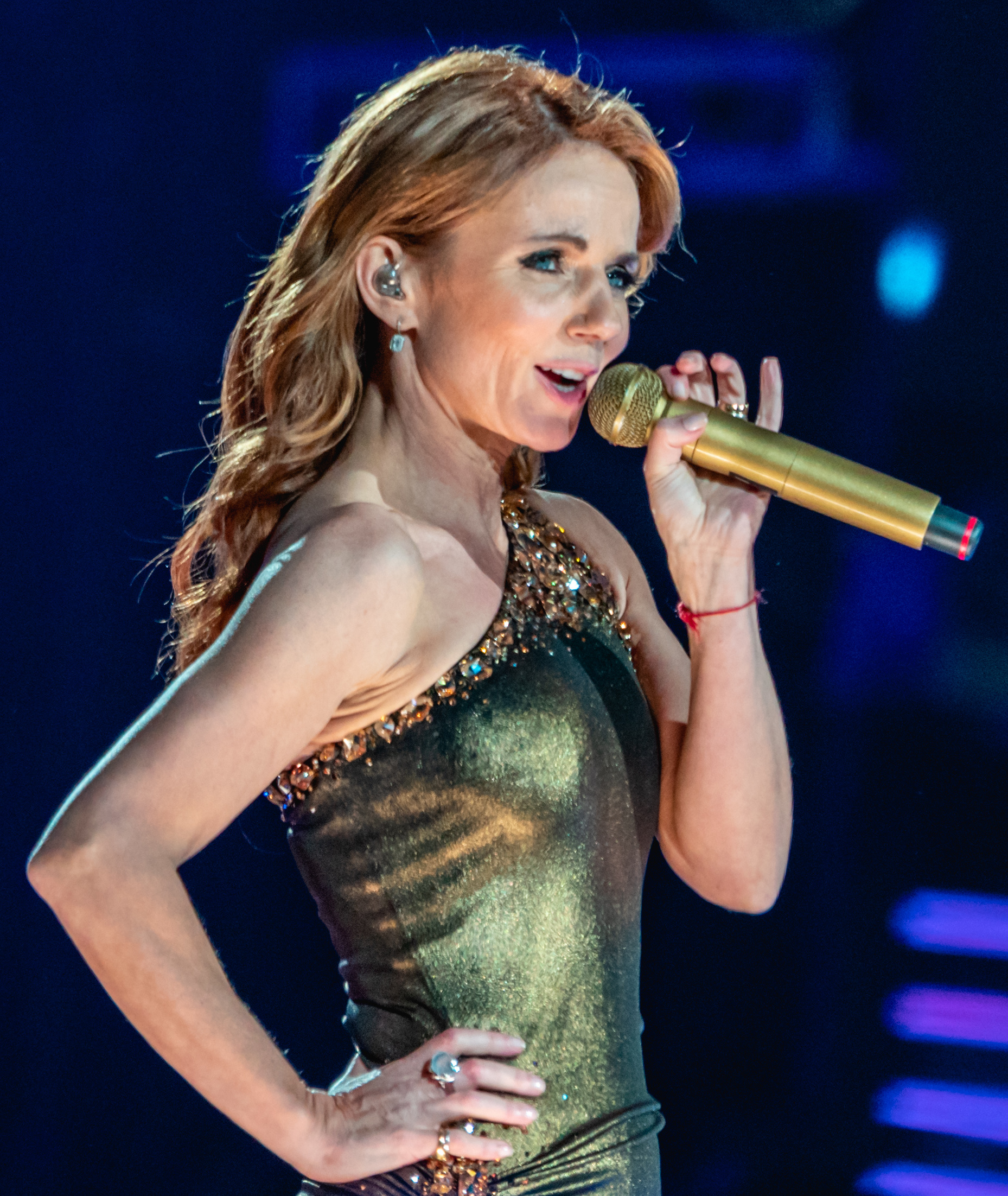
- Halliwell in 2019
- Born: Geraldine Estelle Halliwell; 6 August 1972 (age 54); Watford, Hertfordshire, England
- Other names: Geri Horner; Ginger Spice
- Occupations: Singer; television personality; author; actress
- Years active: 1994–present
- Spouse: Christian Horner (m. 2015)
- Children: 2
- Musical career
- Genres: Pop; dance-pop
- Instrument: Vocals
- Labels: Virgin; EMI; Capitol; Innocent; Sony Music Australia; Eastwest
- Formerly of: Spice Girls
- Website: gerihalliwell.com

Geraldine Estelle Halliwell-Horner (née Halliwell; born 6 August 1972) is an English singer, television personality, author, and actress. She rose to fame in the mid-1990s as a member of the pop group the Spice Girls, in which she was nicknamed Ginger Spice. With over 100 million records sold worldwide, the Spice Girls are the best-selling female group of all time. Their slogan "girl power" was most closely associated with Halliwell and her Union Jack dress from the 1997 Brit Awards also became an enduring symbol.

Halliwell left the Spice Girls in 1998 and launched a solo career with the album Schizophonic (1999), which produced the UK number-one singles "Mi Chico Latino", "Lift Me Up" and "Bag It Up"; the lead single, "Look at Me", reached number two. Her second album, Scream If You Wanna Go Faster (2001), was preceded by the chart-topping lead single, "It's Raining Men" and earned her a Brit Award nomination. Her third album, Passion (2005), produced the UK top five single "Ride It". Halliwell has reunited with the Spice Girls on several occasions, including a greatest hits album (2007) and two concert tours: the Return of the Spice Girls (2007–2008) and Spice World (2019).

Alongside her music career, Halliwell has served as a judge on television talent shows, including Popstars: The Rivals (2002), The X Factor UK (2010, 2012), and Australia's Got Talent (2013). She has appeared in the films Spice World (1997), Crank: High Voltage (2009) and Gran Turismo (2023). As an author, she has released two autobiographies: If Only (1999) and Just for the Record (2002); the children's book series Ugenia Lavender (2008), and the young adult novel series Rosie Frost (2023–present). Halliwell is a Goodwill Ambassador for the United Nations Population Fund (UNFPA).

== Early life ==
Geraldine Estelle Halliwell was born on 6 August 1972 at Watford General Hospital in Watford, Hertfordshire, the daughter of Ana María (née Hidalgo) and Laurence Francis Halliwell (1922–1993). Her mother is a Spaniard, hailing from Huesca, the granddaughter of the Mayor of Córdoba, Spain, Manuel Sánchez-Badajoz, who was executed by Francisco Franco in 1936. Her father was of Swedish, Finnish, English and a "bit of French" descent. Halliwell's paternal grandfather was a Swedish-speaking Finn, Mathias Karlson Sjövik, born in Korsnäs, Finland, who emigrated to Sweden. Halliwell grew up on a council estate in North Watford. She was educated at Watford Grammar School for Girls and Camden School for Girls. Before starting her music career, Halliwell had worked as a nightclub dancer in Mallorca, a presenter on the Turkish version of Let's Make a Deal, and a glamour model. At the age of 19, she appeared as a Page 3 girl in The Sun. Following her rise to fame, nude photos of Halliwell were republished in a number of magazines such as Playboy and Penthouse in 1998.

== Career ==
=== 1994–1998: Spice Girls ===
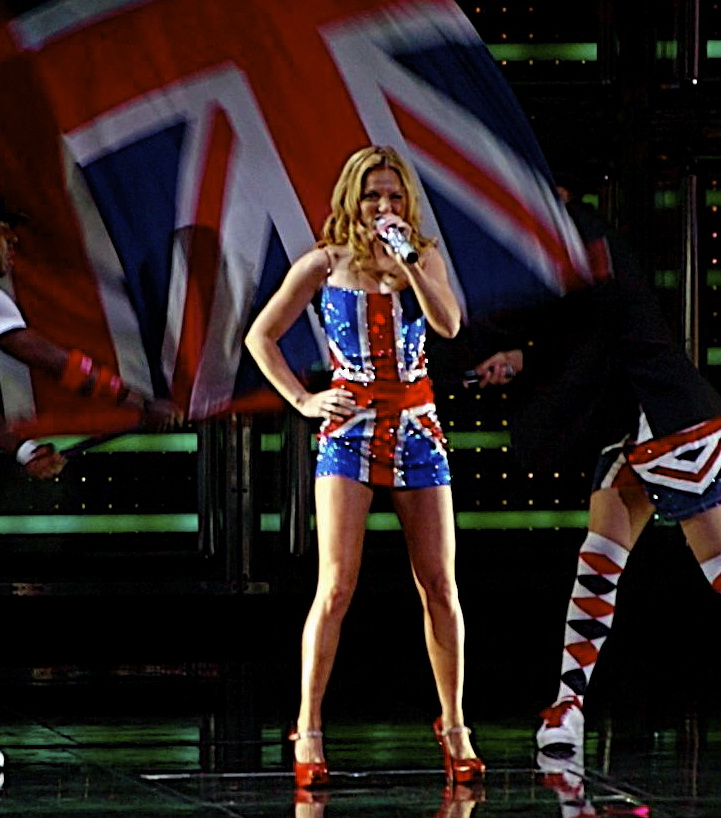
Halliwell in 2008 wearing a remake of her Union Jack dress from the 1997 Brit Awards

In 1994, Halliwell, along with Melanie C, Mel B and Victoria Beckham, responded to an advertisement in The Stage magazine seeking members for a new all-girl pop group. Around 400 women responded and auditioned. After a couple of line-up changes, Halliwell, Melanie C, Mel B and Beckham became the members of the group called "Touch", and were later joined by Emma Bunton.

In March 1995, the group broke with their original management, Heart Management. In the months that followed, they teamed up with music manager Simon Fuller, signed a deal with Virgin Records, and changed the group name to Spice Girls.< In 1996, the group released their debut album, Spice, which became a worldwide commercial success. The album peaked at number one in more than 17 countries and was certified multi-platinum in 27 countries. The group's massive and sudden popularity was compared to Beatlemania. The album sold 30 million copies worldwide, became the biggest-selling album in music history by a girl group, and is one of the most successful albums of all time. The album's first single, "Wannabe", reached number one in 37 countries and all of the subsequent singles from the album – "Say You'll Be There", "2 Become 1", "Who Do You Think You Are" and "Mama" – also peaked at number one in United Kingdom.

Shortly after the release of "Wannabe", each member of the group received a nickname from Top of the Pops magazine; the use of these nicknames later became widespread. Because of her red hair, Halliwell was named "Ginger Spice". Although regularly uttered by all five Spice Girls, the phrase "girl power" was most closely associated with Halliwell and was often accompanied with a V sign. In a Christmas 1996 interview with The Spectator magazine, Halliwell spoke of former Prime Minister Margaret Thatcher as being an inspiration for their girl power ideology. In a 2019 interview with Harper's Bazaar, she said, "For me, if you look it up, it means equalisation between the sexes. It means everybody, whether you're a man, woman or something in between. Forget about labels, it's about embracing everyone's individuality and giving them the opportunity and gender equality and pushing that forward."

In 1997, the group released their second album, Spiceworld. The album's first two singles "Spice Up Your Life" and "Too Much" reached number one in the UK, marking seven consecutive number one singles, an all-time record for a musical group. The album was a global best seller, selling 20 million copies worldwide. The group also starred in their own film, Spiceworld: The Movie, which grossed $100 million worldwide. The third single from Spiceworld, "Stop", peaked at two, breaking the group's sequence of number ones.

On 31 May 1998, Halliwell announced through her solicitor that she had left the Spice Girls due to depression and differences between the group. Her action aroused controversy as her former group was due to embark on a North American tour, which they eventually completed without her. In the months that followed, Halliwell was featured on two more Spice Girls releases that were scheduled prior to her departure. On 1 June 1998, Halliwell alongside the other Spice Girls were featured in the song and video for "(How Does It Feel to Be) On Top of the World", the official theme of the England national football team for the 1998 World Cup. In July 1998, the Spice Girls released "Viva Forever" as the final single from Spiceworld. The animated music video for the song still features Halliwell's likeness, as it was in production months prior to her departure. The group is among the best-selling girl groups of all time, selling over 75 million albums.

=== 1999–2003: Schizophonic and Scream If You Wanna Go Faster ===
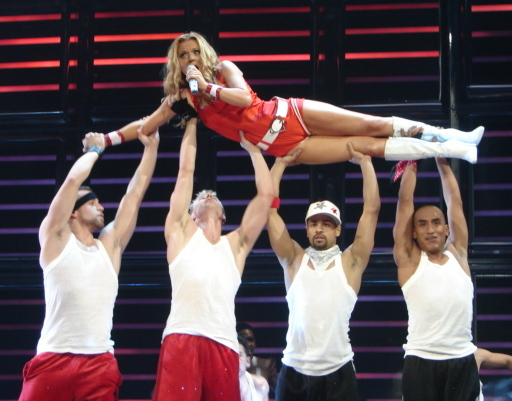
Halliwell performing "It's Raining Men", her fourth number-one single, on the Return of The Spice Girls Tour

In 1999, one year after leaving the group, Halliwell released her first solo album Schizophonic, with the lead single "Look at Me", produced by Absolute and Phil Bucknall. "Look at Me" was followed by further number ones at the UK Singles Chart, "Mi Chico Latino", "Lift Me Up" and "Bag It Up". The album itself reached a peak at number four in the United Kingdom and sold 600,000 copies there, making it double platinum. The album was preceded by a 90-minute documentary titled Geri, released in May 1999 for the British television channel Channel 4 by Molly Dineen. The documentary was a ratings success with 4.5 million viewers—almost one-fifth of available viewers—and Channel 4 aired it again one month later. Halliwell was nominated at the BRIT Awards ceremony in 2000 for Best British Female Solo Artist and Best Pop Act; she performed "Bag It Up" during the show. In the United States, Schizophonic peaked at number 42 on the Billboard 200 and was certified gold for shipments of over 500,000 copies. The album has sold over two million copies worldwide.

In October 1999, Halliwell released the autobiography If Only, in which she described her life as a Spice Girl. By the following year, the book had sold over 200,000 copies. Halliwell donated the advance she received for the book to a London-based breast cancer care organization.

In 2001, Halliwell released her second album, Scream If You Wanna Go Faster. The album peaked at number five in the United Kingdom and was certified gold. Her cover version of the Weather Girls' 1983 hit, "It's Raining Men" was released as the lead single from the album and was also included on the Bridget Jones's Diary film soundtrack. "It's Raining Men" became a major hit worldwide, peaking at number one in the United Kingdom and within the top 10 in over 27 countries, becoming Halliwell's biggest hit to date. The song won her the International Song of the Year award at the 2002 NRJ Music Awards. Follow-up singles "Scream If You Wanna Go Faster" and "Calling" reached number eight and number seven in the United Kingdom, respectively. Halliwell also released a French version of "Calling" titled "Au Nom de L'amour". In 2001, Halliwell released the yoga DVD Geri Yoga with Katy Appleton; this was followed by Geri Body Yoga the following year.

In January 2002, Halliwell was once again nominated at the BRIT Awards, this time for Best British Female Solo Artist and Best British Single for "It's Raining Men". In September 2002, she released her second autobiography, Just for the Record. In late 2002, Halliwell was featured alongside Pete Waterman and Louis Walsh as a judge on the television series Popstars: The Rivals, which created Girls Aloud. She was also featured as a guest reporter on the television program Extra in the US. In 2003, she made a guest appearance on the television series Sex and the City.

=== 2004–2012: Passion, Ugenia Lavender, and Spice Girls reunion ===
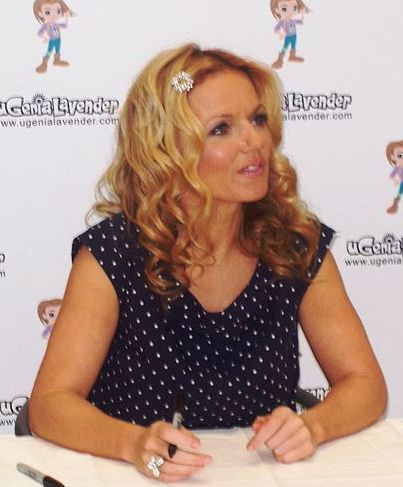
Halliwell at a book signing in 2008

In late 2004, Halliwell made a return to music with the single "Ride It", which reached number four in the United Kingdom and number one on the dance charts. Halliwell planned her first solo tour of the United Kingdom and Ireland, but low ticket sales led to the cancellation of the tour. That year, Halliwell appeared in the 2004 film Fat Slags, based on characters from Viz magazine. She also appeared on Channel Five as one of the hosts of the Party in the Park event for the Prince's Trust and was the presenter and main performer of the Tickled Pink Girls' night in Live! event. The single "Desire" was released on 30 May 2005, reaching number 22 in the UK Singles Chart and number one on the UK Dance Charts. Released shortly after, the source album, Passion, peaked at number 41 in the British charts. The album was preceded by the promotional documentary There's Something About Geri.

On 12 April 2007, it was announced that Halliwell had signed a six-book deal with Macmillan Children's Books. The series of children's novels, titled Ugenia Lavender, follow the adventures of nine-year-old Ugenia, a character based on Halliwell, alongside her friends Bronte, Rudy and Trevor. The character Princess Posh Vattoria, a caricature of Halliwell's bandmate Victoria Beckham, was featured in early drafts, but has not appeared in the book series. Other characters are said by Halliwell to be loosely based on Gordon Ramsay, George Michael, Marilyn Monroe, Vincent van Gogh, Wayne Rooney and the character Justin Suarez from the TV series Ugly Betty. According to the official site, the book sold more than 250,000 copies in its first 5 months, making Halliwell 2008's most successful female celebrity children's author.

On 29 June 2007, the Spice Girls regrouped and announced plans for a reunion tour, from which they were said to have earned £10 million each (about US$20 million). The group toured as a quintet and released their first compilation album, Greatest Hits. This album was released in early November 2007 and the tour began on 2 December 2007. On 31 December 2007, the Spice Girls documentary Spice Girls: Giving You Everything was released. In addition to their sell-out tour, the Spice Girls appeared in Tesco advertisements for which they were paid £1 million each.

In 2009, Halliwell appeared in the film Crank: High Voltage and on the BBC One's The One Show on 7 May 2009. In 2010, Halliwell stood in for Dannii Minogue as a guest judge on The X Factor at the Glasgow auditions alongside Simon Cowell, Louis Walsh and Cheryl. In March 2010, vocal coach and singer Carrie Grant announced on ITV1's The Alan Titchmarsh Show that Halliwell would be making a return to music. In April 2010, Halliwell posted a message on her website, saying she was back in the studio. On 31 July 2011, Halliwell confirmed she had been working on her fourth album and remarked that it was "pretty much finished." In February 2012, Halliwell announced that her fourth album was being mastered.

=== 2012–2019: Return to music and second Spice Girls reunion ===
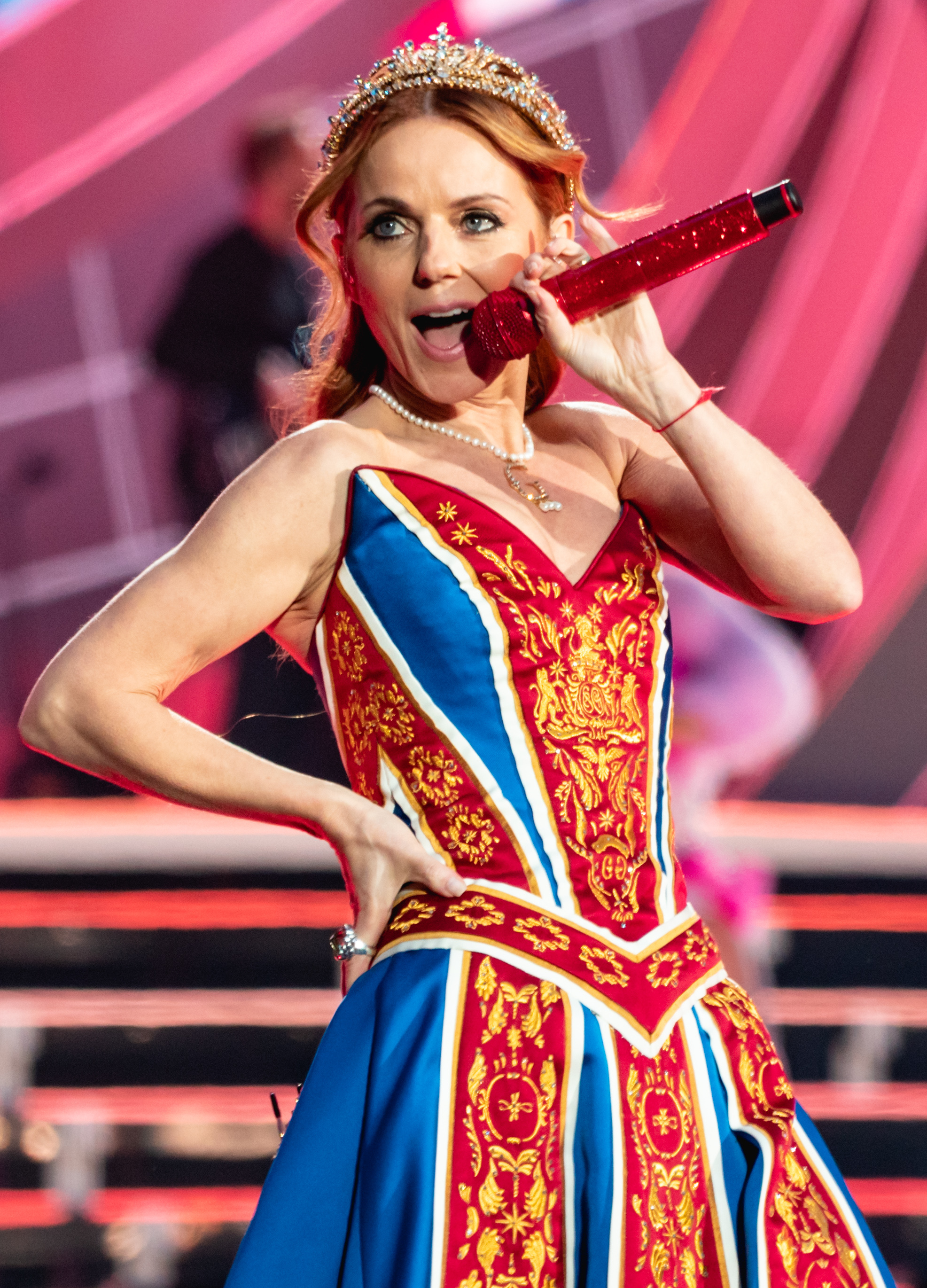
Halliwell during Spice World – 2019 Tour, June 2019

In 2012, Halliwell returned as a guest judge on The X Factor at the Liverpool auditions, standing in for Kelly Rowland. In April 2013, the Nine Network announced that she would become the fourth judge on season seven of Australia's Got Talent replacing Minogue. In August 2012, Halliwell reunited with the Spice Girls to perform as a quintet at the closing ceremony of the Olympic Games in London. The group also teamed up with Jennifer Saunders and Judy Craymer to develop a musical based on the songs of the Spice Girls titled Viva Forever!, which opened on 11 December 2012. In October 2012, Halliwell made her first solo performance in seven years at the Breast Cancer Care, debuting a new track called "Phenomenal Woman".

On 3 October 2013, Halliwell premiered her first solo single in nearly eight years, "Half of Me", with a performance on Channel 9's NRL Footy Show grand final show in Australia. On 12 September 2013, it was announced that the song would be released exclusively in Australia as part of a new deal with Sony Music Australia. The single was released on 25 October 2013 and reached number 281 in the Australian charts. On the grand final of Australia's Got Talent, she performed an acoustic version of the Spice Girls' hit single "Wannabe".

In 2015, Halliwell continued to work on new material for a fourth studio album. She guest presented an episode of The One Show in October 2015. In November 2016, 13 new songs by Halliwell which were reportedly recorded for an album titled Man on the Mountain were leaked onto the internet.

In July 2016, Halliwell, Mel B and Bunton released a video celebrating the 20th anniversary of Spice Girls' debut single "Wannabe" and teased news from them as a three-piece; Beckham and Melanie C opted not to take part in a reunion project, with Mel B saying that both members gave the three-piece their blessing to continue with the project. However, following Halliwell's announcement of her pregnancy, the project was cancelled. That year, Halliwell appeared on episode three of the 2016 series of Sport Relief Bake Off.

In March 2017, Halliwell presented the BBC Two documentary Geri's 90s: My Drive to Freedom as part of the BBC Music: My Generation series. In June 2017, Halliwell released a charity single, "Angels in Chains", a tribute to George Michael, to raise money for Childline. The single peaked at number 63 on the Official Singles Downloads Chart Top 100. She sat in for Zoë Ball on BBC Radio 2 in July 2017. She guest presented an episode of This Morning in August 2017 with Rylan Clark-Neal. In 2018, she was a judge on the Saturday night BBC One talent show All Together Now.

On 5 November 2018, the Spice Girls announced their reunion Spice World – 2019 Tour; Beckham declined to join due to commitments regarding her fashion business.

=== 2020–present: Rainbow Woman and Rosie Frost ===
In November 2020, Halliwell started the original YouTube series Rainbow Woman for which she wrote, directed, and served as an executive producer. The series features Halliwell taking part in series of vignettes that follow her on different adventures. In August 2021, she had a voice role in the short animated movie The Crown with a Shadow, directed by J.B. Ghuman Jr.

Halliwell was in the cast of the 2023 film Gran Turismo, playing the wife of Djimon Hounsou. Gran Turismo premiered at the Circuit de Spa-Francorchamps in Belgium on 30 July 2023, and was theatrically released in the United States on 25 August 2023, by Sony Pictures Releasing. It has grossed $122 million worldwide against its $60 million budget.

In October 2022, Halliwell announced a new book deal with the UK branch of Scholastic. The first book announced is a young adult novel titled Rosie Frost and the Falcon Queen. The story is about an orphan who travels to Bloodstone Island—an island that is home to a school for extraordinary teens and a refuge for animals, where she uncovers a dark family secret. Halliwell said in a statement: "Rosie Frost has lived in my heart for a long time – and this feels just the right moment to introduce her to the world". The book was released on 3 October 2023. Alongside its release, Halliwell released the original songs "Ghost in My House" and "Beautiful Life" to promote the book. That same month, Halliwell went to the United States on a book tour. On 6 October 2023, Halliwell appeared on an episode of CBeebies Bedtime Stories, reading I Love You Because I Love You by Muợn Thị Văn.

A second Rosie Frost novel, titled Rosie Frost: Ice on Fire, is due for release in April 2025. Once again, she toured the United States to promote the book series. On 10 April 2025, Halliwell revealed in an interview on The Drew Barrymore Show that the rights had been bought to turn the Rosie Frost series into either films or television series; she added that Rosie Frost had always been imagined as a trilogy. The book debuted at number six on the New York Times Bestseller list, in the Children's Middle Grade Hardcover category.

== Other ventures ==
=== Fashion ===
In 2010, Halliwell partnered with British retailer Next to create a swimwear collection named "Geri by Next". This was followed by a Union Jack-motif clothing range in 2012, inspired by Halliwell's famous 1997 Union Jack dress.

=== Philanthropy ===
In 1998, Halliwell became a Goodwill Ambassador for the United Nations Population Fund (UNFPA). In 2000 Halliwell appeared in the two-part documentary series Geri's World Walkabout for the BBC, which followed her work with the UN and other travels. That same year, she gave the opening address at the UN Youth Summit. Halliwell picked up further UN work in 2006, by visiting Zambia from 14 to 16 November, to promote greater international awareness of the urgent need to reduce maternal death and halt the spread of HIV/AIDS. In September 2009, Halliwell, in her role as a Goodwill Ambassador of UNFPA, visited Nepal to help launch a national campaign to stop violence against women.

On 25 October 2015, the Mail on Sunday reported that Halliwell had been in talks with the Department for Education with a view to establishing a free school in north London, scheduled to open in 2018 and specialising in the arts and business. Halliwell told the newspaper: "I believe in education. It's an empowering fundamental human right that everyone deserves. Education is a foundation for life." The Department subsequently confirmed that it had spoken with Halliwell, but that discussions were at an early stage.

=== Politics ===
In the run-up to the 1997 general election, Halliwell declared: "I saw a lot of what Mrs Thatcher did. She was definitely the original Spice Girl rising from the greengrocer's daughter to Prime Minister." She had said in 1996 that Tony Blair was "not a safe pair of hands for the economy". By the 2001 general election, Halliwell had switched her support to Tony Blair and the Labour Party, making a cameo appearance in one of their party election broadcasts.

In a 2007 interview with The Guardian, Halliwell said she was a feminist, but took issue with its image, explaining: "It's about branding. For me, feminism is bra-burning lesbianism. It's very unglamorous. I'd like to see it rebranded. We need to see a celebration of our femininity and softness."

Following the death of Margaret Thatcher in 2013, Halliwell paid tribute to Thatcher on Twitter and wrote: "Thinking of our 1st Lady of girl power, Margaret Thatcher, a green grocer's daughter who taught me any thing is possible...x" before deleting the post in response to negative comments from fans. Halliwell later expressed regret for deleting the Tweet and wrote on her personal blog: "Now I realise that I do admire a woman, whether she is right or wrong, regardless of her opinions. She had the courage to stand by her convictions. Not like me. I look at my behavior, which exposed how weak I was under fire, not like Margaret Thatcher. Rest in peace."

In 2019, Halliwell named Winston Churchill as a historical British figure she admired.

In 2022, Halliwell posed for photographs with Conservative Party politicians Nadine Dorries and Liz Truss (then the British foreign secretary) during the UEFA Women's Euro 2022 final and reportedly endorsed Truss' campaign in the July–September 2022 Conservative Party leadership election.

== Personal life ==
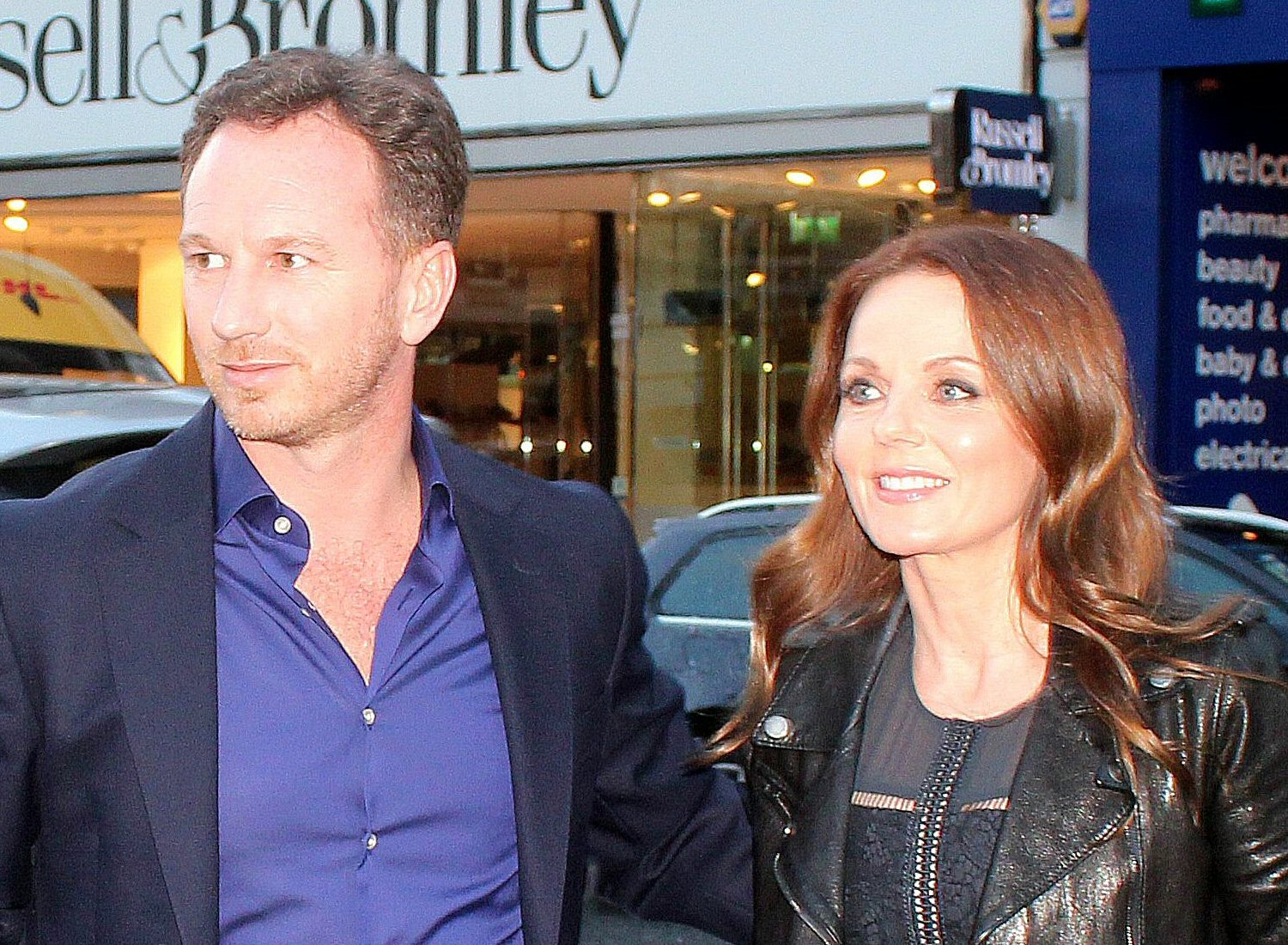
Halliwell and Horner in London in April 2016

In 2001, Halliwell was in a short-term relationship with the pop singer Robbie Williams.

Halliwell gave birth to a daughter in May 2006. The child's father is screenwriter Sacha Gervasi with whom Halliwell was in a relationship in 2005; Victoria Beckham and Emma Bunton are godmothers.

Halliwell began dating Christian Horner in February 2014. They announced their engagement on 11 November 2014 and the couple were married on 15 May 2015 at St Mary's Church in Woburn, Bedfordshire. In October 2016, Halliwell said that she and Horner were expecting their first child together. Halliwell gave birth to a son on 21 January 2017.

In a 2019 interview with Piers Morgan, Melanie Brown was asked if she had slept with Halliwell in an intimate manner and she nodded yes. Halliwell released a statement saying that the press reports following the interview had been "hurtful to her family". Brown responded: "I just said it was like a little thing and we giggled about it the next day and that's that. It's the press [who] have taken it onto a whole new level."

Halliwell's first dog, Harry, came from Battersea Dogs & Cats Home. She later adopted Daisy, who survived life-saving liver surgery at just six months old, as seen on Paul O'Grady: For the Love of Dogs.

Halliwell has spoken out about her experiences of bulimia, saying that she came close to death, weighing just 7 stone (98 lb; 44 kg), and was advised by Robbie Williams to seek medical help. In 2011, she spoke of being comfortable with her body and credits her newly healthy relationship with food to motherhood. After having previously been agnostic, Halliwell became a Christian after taking the Alpha Course evangelical program.

Halliwell's brother, Max, died on 17 November 2021, at age 54.

In 2022, Halliwell was awarded an honorary doctorate from Sheffield Hallam University.

She is a supporter of Watford.

== Discography ==
- Schizophonic (1999)
- Scream If You Wanna Go Faster (2001)
- Passion (2005)

== Bibliography ==
- 1999: If Only
- 2002: Just for the Record
- 2008: Ugenia Lavender: The First Book
- 2008: Ugenia Lavender and the Terrible Tiger
- 2008: Ugenia Lavender and the Burning Pants
- 2008: Ugenia Lavender: Home Alone
- 2008: Ugenia Lavender and the Temple of Gloom
- 2008: Ugenia Lavender: The One and Only
- 2023: Rosie Frost and the Falcon Queen
- 2025: Rosie Frost: Ice on Fire

== Filmography ==
Television
| Year | Title | Role | Notes |
|---|---|---|---|
| 1990 | Dance Energy | Herself | Uncredited; only as dancer-stagehand |
| 1991 | Let's Make a Deal | Herself | Uncredited; only as dancer-stagehand |
| 1997–2004 | Franklin | Badger | UK version (voice only) |
| 1999 | 100 Greatest Women of Rock & Roll | Presenter | TV show |
| 1999 | Al salir de clase | Herself | "Duelo en las calles" (episode 63; season 3) "Rebelión en las aulas" (episode 65; season 3) |
| 2002 | Bo' Selecta! | Various roles | "Geri Halliwell" (episode 4; season 1) |
| 2002 | Popstars: The Rivals | Mentor/Judge | Season 1 |
| 2003 | All American Girl | Mentor/Herself/Judge | Season 1 |
| 2003 | Sex and the City | Phoebe Herrison | "Boy, Interrupted" (episode 10; season 6) |
| 2004 | Top Gear | Herself | "5.2" (episode 2; season 5) |
| 2008 | Friday Night Project | Presenter/Sely/Lissandra | Episode 5; season 6 |
| 2008 | American Idol | Mentor/Judge | Episode 30; season 7 |
| 2009 | Head Case | Susan Galler | "Back in the Game" (episode 5; season 3) |
| 2010 | Come Fly With Me | Herself | "Pilot" (episode 1; season 1) |
| 2010, 2012 | The X Factor | Guest judge | Season 7 (Glasgow auditions judge); Season 9 (Liverpool auditions judge) |
| 2012 | The Spice Girls Story: Viva Forever | Herself | Documentary about the Spice Girls |
| 2012 | Trollied | Herself | "2012 Christmas Special" |
| 2013 | Australia's Got Talent | Judge | Series 7 |
| 2015 | The One Show | Guest presenter | 1 episode |
| 2016 | The Great Sport Relief Bake Off | Contestant | 1 episode |
| 2017 | Geri's 90s: My Drive to Freedom | Presenter | One-off documentary |
| 2017 | This Morning | Guest presenter | 1 episode |
| 2017 | Gordon, Gino and Fred's Great Christmas Roast | Participant | One-off special |
| 2018—2019 | All Together Now | Presenter / Judge | 2 series |
| 2019 | RuPaul's Drag Race UK | Guest Judge | 1 episode (episode 4, season 1) |
| 2019—2023 | Formula 1: Drive to Survive | Guest appearance | 3 episodes |

Films
| Year | Title | Role | Notes |
|---|---|---|---|
| 1995 | Foggy Notion | Sami | Main role |
| 1997 | Spice World | Ginger Spice | |
| 1999 | Geri – A Film by Molly Dineen | Herself | TV film; documentary |
| 2000 | Geri's World Walkabouts | Herself | TV film; documentary |
| 2004 | Fat Slags: The Film | Paige Stonach | |
| 2005 | There's Something About Geri | Herself | TV film; documentary |
| 2007 | Giving You Everything | Herself | TV film; documentary |
| | Metal Slug The Movie | Fio Germi | |
| 2009 | Crank: High Voltage | Karen Chelios | |
| 2009 | Ant & Dec's Christmas Show | Geri Doll | TV film |
| 2012 | Viva Forever – The Spice Girls Story | Herself | TV movie; documentary |
| 2021 | The Crown with a Shadow | Queen | Short animated movie |
| 2023 | Gran Turismo | Lesley Mardenborough | |

== Awards and nominations ==
| Year | Award | Category | For | Result | Notes |
|---|---|---|---|---|---|
| 1999 | Blockbuster Entertainment Award | Favourite Actress – Comedy | Spiceworld | Nominated | Shared with the Spice Girls |
| 1999 | MTV Europe Music Awards | Best Female | Herself | Nominated | |
| 1999 | Smash Hits Poll Winners Party | Hero of 1999 | Herself | Nominated | |
| 1999 | Smash Hits Poll Winners Party | Best Female Artist | Herself | Nominated | |
| 2000 | Brit Awards | Best British Female Solo Artist | Herself | Nominated | |
| 2000 | Brit Awards | Best Pop Act | Herself | Nominated | |
| 2000 | Capital FM Awards | Best British Female Singer | Herself | Won | |
| 2001 | Comet Awards | Best International Female Singer | Herself | Won | |
| 2001 | Radio Disney Music Awards | Best Soundtrack Song | "It's Raining Men" | Nominated | |
| 2002 | Brit Awards | Best British Female Solo Artist | Herself | Nominated | |
| 2002 | Brit Awards | Best British Single | "It's Raining Men" | Nominated | |
| 2002 | NRJ Music Awards | International Song of the Year | "It's Raining Men" | Won | |
| 2002 | NRJ Music Awards | International Female Artist of the Year | Herself | Nominated | |
| 2008 | | Bestselling female celebrity children's author of 2008 | Ugenia Lavender | Won | |
| 2016 | Attitude Awards | Honorary Gay | Herself | Won | |
