= Brit Awards 1997 =

British music awards ceremony

- Date: 24 February 1997
- Venue: Earls Court
- Hosted by: Ben Elton
- Most awards: Manic Street Preachers and Spice Girls (2)
- Most nominations: Spice Girls (5)

Television/radio coverage
- Network: ITV

Brit Awards 1997 was the 17th edition of the Brit Awards, an annual pop music awards ceremony in the United Kingdom. It was organised by the British Phonographic Industry and took place on 24 February 1997 at Earls Court Exhibition Centre in London.

== Performances ==
Artist(s)	Song(s)
Bee Gees	"To Love Somebody" "Massachusetts" "Words" "How Deep Is Your Love" "Jive Talkin'" "Stayin' Alive" "You Should Be Dancing"
Diana Ross featuring Jamiroquai	"Upside Down"
The Fugees	"Killing Me Softly with His Song"
Manic Street Preachers	"A Design for Life"
Mark Morrison	"Return of the Mack"
Prince	"Emancipation"
Sheryl Crow	"Everyday Is a Winding Road"
Skunk Anansie	"Teenage Kicks"
Spice Girls	"Wannabe" "Who Do You Think You Are"

== Winners and nominees ==
British Album of the Year (presented by Zoë Ball)	British Producer of the Year (presented by Sharleen Spiteri)
Manic Street Preachers – Everything Must Go; Kula Shaker – K; Lighthouse Family – Ocean Drive; George Michael – Older; Ocean Colour Scene – Moseley Shoals	John Leckie; Absolute, Richard Stannard and Matt Rowe; Hugh Jones; Mike Hedges; Tricky
British Single of the Year (presented by Caroline Aherne)	British Video of the Year (presented by Frank Skinner)
Spice Girls – "Wannabe"; Babybird – "You're Gorgeous"; Kula Shaker – "Tattva"; Lighthouse Family – "Lifted"; Manic Street Preachers – "A Design for Life"; George Michael – "Fastlove"; Mark Morrison – "Return of the Mack"; Oasis – "Don't Look Back in Anger"; The Prodigy – "Firestarter"; Underworld – "Born Slippy"	Spice Girls – "Say You'll Be There"; The Chemical Brothers – "Setting Sun"; Dodgy – "Good Enough"; Jamiroquai – "Virtual Insanity"; Manic Street Preachers – "A Design for Life"; George Michael – "Fastlove"; Orbital – "The Box"; The Prodigy – "Breathe"; The Prodigy – "Firestarter"; Spice Girls – "Wannabe"
British Male Solo Artist (presented by Elton John)	British Female Solo Artist (presented by Naomi Campbell)
George Michael; Mark Morrison; Mick Hucknall; Sting; Tricky	Gabrielle; Dina Carroll; Donna Lewis; Eddi Reader; Louise
British Group (presented by Colin Jackson and Vinnie Jones)	British Breakthrough Act (presented by Jo Whiley)
Manic Street Preachers; Kula Shaker; Lightning Seeds; Ocean Colour Scene; Spice Girls	Kula Shaker; Alisha's Attic; Ash; Babybird; The Bluetones; Lighthouse Family; Longpigs; Mansun; Mark Morrison; Skunk Anansie; Space; Spice Girls
British Dance Act (presented by Samantha Fox)	Soundtrack/Cast Recording (presented by Lenny Henry)
The Prodigy; The Chemical Brothers; Jamiroquai; Mark Morrison; Underworld	Trainspotting; Dangerous Minds; Evita; La Passione; Mission: Impossible
International Male Solo Artist (presented by Snoop Dogg)	International Female Solo Artist (presented by Eddie Izzard)
Beck; Babyface; Bryan Adams; Prince; Robert Miles	Sheryl Crow; Celine Dion; Joan Osborne; Neneh Cherry; Toni Braxton
International Group (presented by Lennox Lewis)	International Breakthrough Act (presented by Gary Barlow and Louise Redknapp)
The Fugees; Boyzone; The Presidents of the United States of America; R.E.M.; The Smashing Pumpkins	Robert Miles; Fun Lovin Criminals; Joan Osborne; The Presidents of the United States of America; The Tony Rich Project

=== Outstanding Contribution to Music ===
- Bee Gees

== Multiple nominations and awards ==
The following artists received multiple awards and/or nominations.

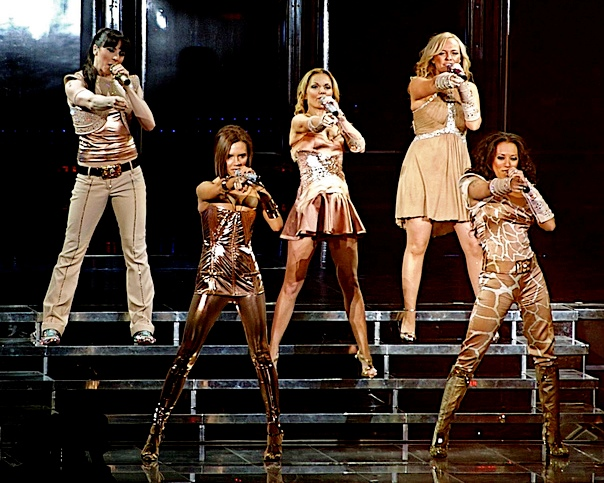
Two-time winner Spice Girls as most nominations and awards

Artists that received multiple nominations
Nominations	Artist
5	Spice Girls
4 (5)	George Michael
4 (5)	Kula Shaker
4 (5)	Manic Street Preachers
4 (5)	Mark Morrison
4 (5)	The Prodigy
3	Lighthouse Family
2 (9)	Babybird
2 (9)	The Chemical Brothers
2 (9)	Jamiroquai
2 (9)	Joan Osborne
2 (9)	Ocean Colour Scene
2 (9)	The Presidents of the United States of America
2 (9)	Robert Miles
2 (9)	Tricky
2 (9)	Underworld

Artists that received multiple awards
Awards	Artist
2 (2)	Manic Street Preachers
2 (2)	Spice Girls

== Notable moments ==
=== Geri Halliwell's Union Jack dress and wardrobe malfunction ===
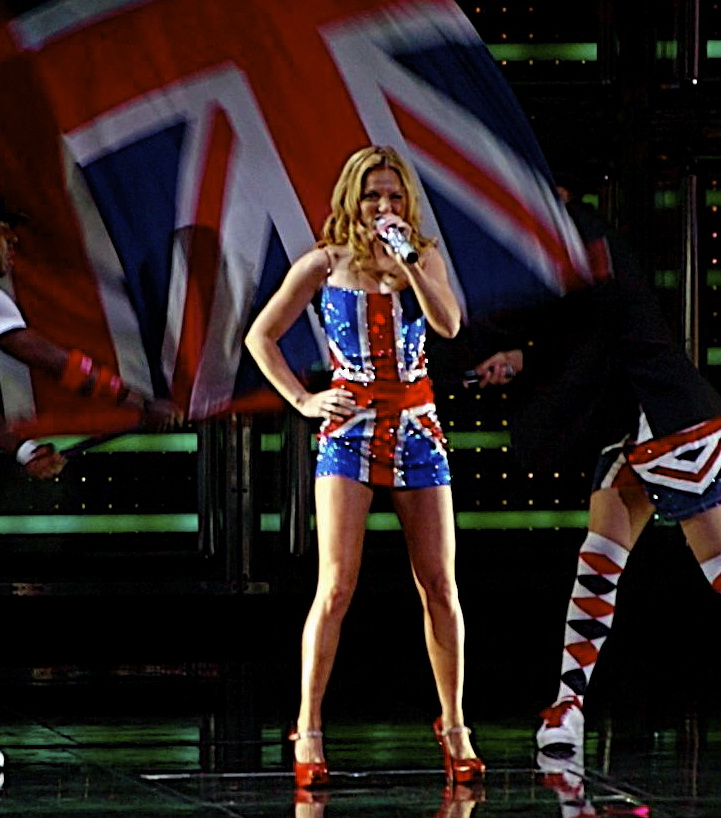
Geri Halliwell of the Spice Girls wearing a remake of the Union Jack as dress

Ginger Spice, Geri Halliwell, wore the Union Jack dress whilst performing onstage with the group. Spicemania was at its height in the UK and the Spice Girls had just cracked the US as well, reaching number 1 with their debut single and album. Geri Halliwell captured the zeitgeist and became pin-up girl for Cool Britannia.

Halliwell was originally going to wear an all-black dress, but she thought it was too boring so her sister sewed on a Union Jack tea-towel, with a 'peace' sign on the back, so as to not offend anyone. It was worn during the Spice Girls' performance of their number one song "Who Do You Think You Are". Later on she sold her dress in a charity auction to Hard Rock Cafe in Las Vegas for a record £41,320, giving Halliwell the Guinness World Record for the most expensive piece of pop star clothing ever sold. The performance won Most Memorable Performance Of 30 Years at the 2010 Brit Awards.

As well her famous Union Jack dress; Geri Halliwell wore a lengthy cut top red dress during the show. When walking up to the stage to collect their award; Geri Halliwell's right breast slipped out from her dress in front of cameras and host Ben Elton.

=== Melanie C and Liam Gallagher ===
Before the ceremony, Oasis member Liam Gallagher told British media that he wasn't going to the Brit Awards because if he bumped into the Spice Girls, he would "smack them". During the group's acceptance speech for Best British Single, Sporty Spice Mel C responded to Gallagher, saying, "Come and have a go if you think you're hard enough".
