= Union Jack dress =

Dress consisting of the Union Jack worn by Geri Halliwell

- Designer: Gucci and Geri Halliwell
- Year: 1997
- Type: Union Jack Gucci mini dress

The Union Jack dress is an item of clothing worn by singer Geri Halliwell of the Spice Girls at the 1997 Brit Awards. The mini dress featured a flag of the United Kingdom, the Union Jack, on the front, and a white peace symbol emblazoned on the black-coloured back of the dress. The next day the images of the dress made the front page of various newspapers around the world, and it is now remembered as one of the most iconic pop moments of the 1990s and Brit Awards history. The dress has become synonymous with the Spice Girls, Halliwell, and the notions of Girl Power and Cool Britannia.

In 2010, The Daily Telegraph reported that the dress came top in an online poll to find the 10 most iconic dresses of the past 50 years, beating other memorable garments such as Marilyn Monroe's white 'Seven Year Itch' halterneck. In 2016, the dress was voted the "Most Inspiring British Fashion Moment" in an online poll conducted by British online retailer Very.

At the 2010 Brit Awards, the Spice Girls performance that featured the Union Jack dress won Most Memorable Performance of 30 Years. The dress held the Guinness World Record for the most expensive piece of popstar clothing sold at an auction.

== Background ==
I've always tried to put my finger to the wind and feel what's going on right now, and if I feel it, then you'll feel it and we'll connect it. So I thought, [it's] The Brits, why not a British flag?

— Halliwell in an interview with Vogue

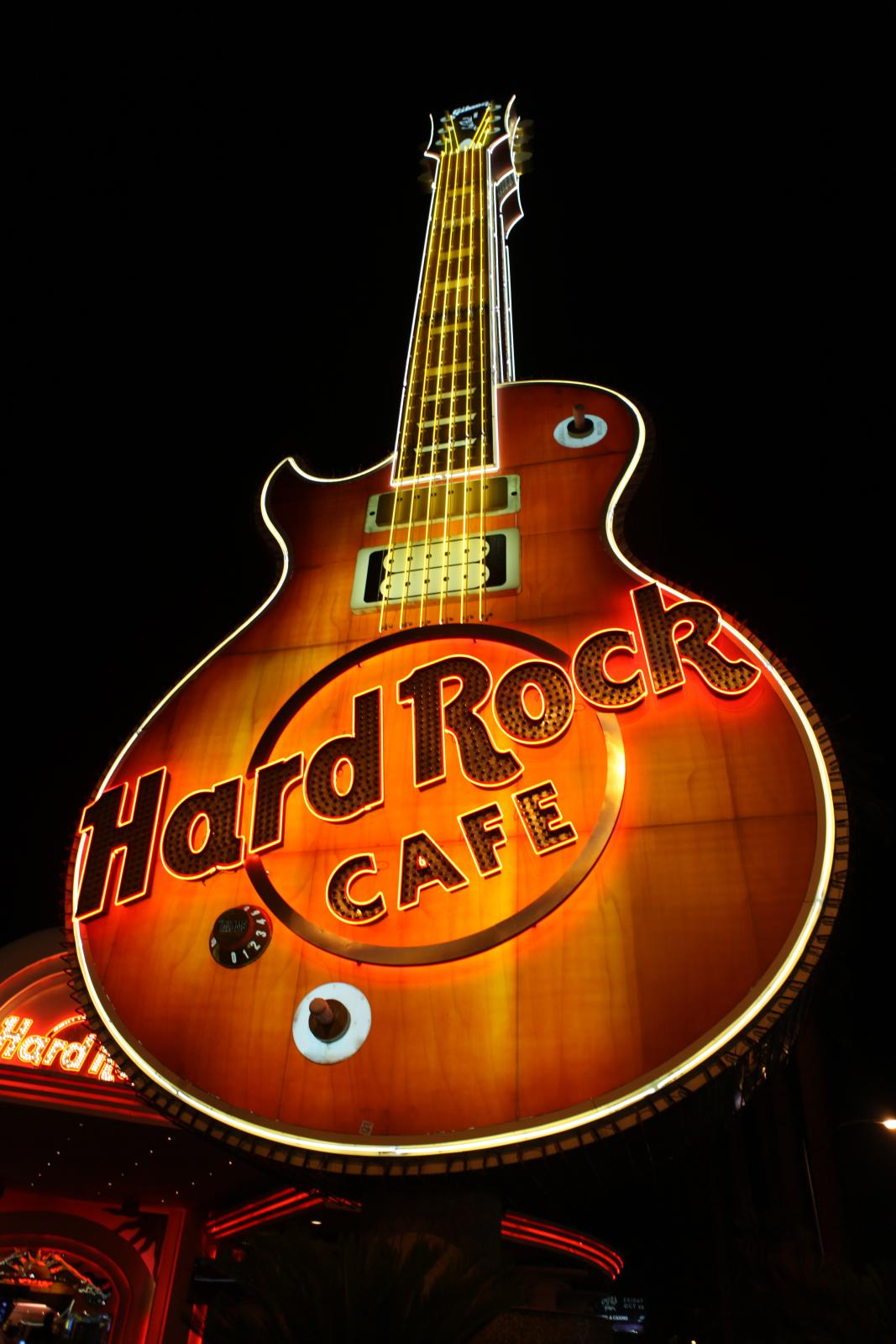
Sign of the Hard Rock Cafe Las Vegas, where the dress is displayed

The Spice Girls were scheduled to open the 1997 Brit Awards, where they were nominated for five awards. Halliwell was given a black Gucci minidress to perform in, which she deemed too "boring". Deciding to "celebrate being British", she asked her sister Natalie to stitch a Union Jack tea towel onto the front of the black dress as a patriotic gesture. To avoid being associated with the National Front, Halliwell also had the CND peace symbol stitched onto the back of the dress. Halliwell wore the dress at the Brit Awards on 24 February 1997, where the group accepted two awards and performed a medley of "Wannabe" and "Who Do You Think You Are".

== History ==
In 1998, a year after Halliwell performed in the dress, she auctioned it off at the London branch of Sotheby's for £41,320 (equivalent to £80,204 in 2025). The buyer was Peter Morton, on behalf of the Hard Rock Hotel and Casino, Las Vegas, who displayed the piece of clothing as pop memorabilia. Morton bid via telephone, and beat other bidders such as The Sun. Halliwell herself watched the "frenzied bid", and rapped the gavel after the final bid. The dress was originally valued at £12,000, but the winning bid was £36,200 (£41,320 including 15% commission). Halliwell gave the proceeds of the dress sale to a children's cancer care charity. The BBC commented on the sale, saying it "marks the end of Geri's links with the Girl Power image of the past". It held the Guinness World Record for the most expensive piece of popstar clothing dealt at auction. The dress was one of many items of Spice Girls memorabilia sold at the auction, where total sales for charity reached £146,511 (equivalent to £284,383 in 2025).

== Remakes ==
=== 2007 ===
For the 2007 Spice Girls reunion tour, named the Return of the Spice Girls, fashion designer Roberto Cavalli designed Halliwell a new Union Jack dress modelled on the original. The new version appeared slightly longer and the flag was made out of rhinestones and Swarovski crystals. Various media outlets reported that Halliwell had attempted to buy back the original dress before their world tour.

Halliwell later said that she "liked" the new dress and that she had decided to keep it as memorabilia.

=== 2012 ===
In 2012, Halliwell designed a clothing range based upon the dress.

=== 2019 ===
For the Spice World – 2019 Tour, Halliwell wore a redesigned floor-length Union Jack dress that featured royal designs on the red stripes and also wore a crown with the dress.

== Controversies ==
=== 2025 Bilton school incident ===
In July 2025, Courtney Wright, a 12-year-old girl, wore a Halliwell inspired Union Jack dress for a cultural heritage day at her school in Bilton. The school forbade her from attending the event while wearing this dress and from delivering a speech she wrote on British culture. The girl said that teachers told her the dress was inappropriate and that only other, non-British, cultures can be celebrated in this event, and she was sent to sit in the reception office until her father collected her. The school later apologised to the girls' family. The incident provoked many reactions, including a statement by Keir Starmer that “being British is something to be celebrated".

== Gallery ==
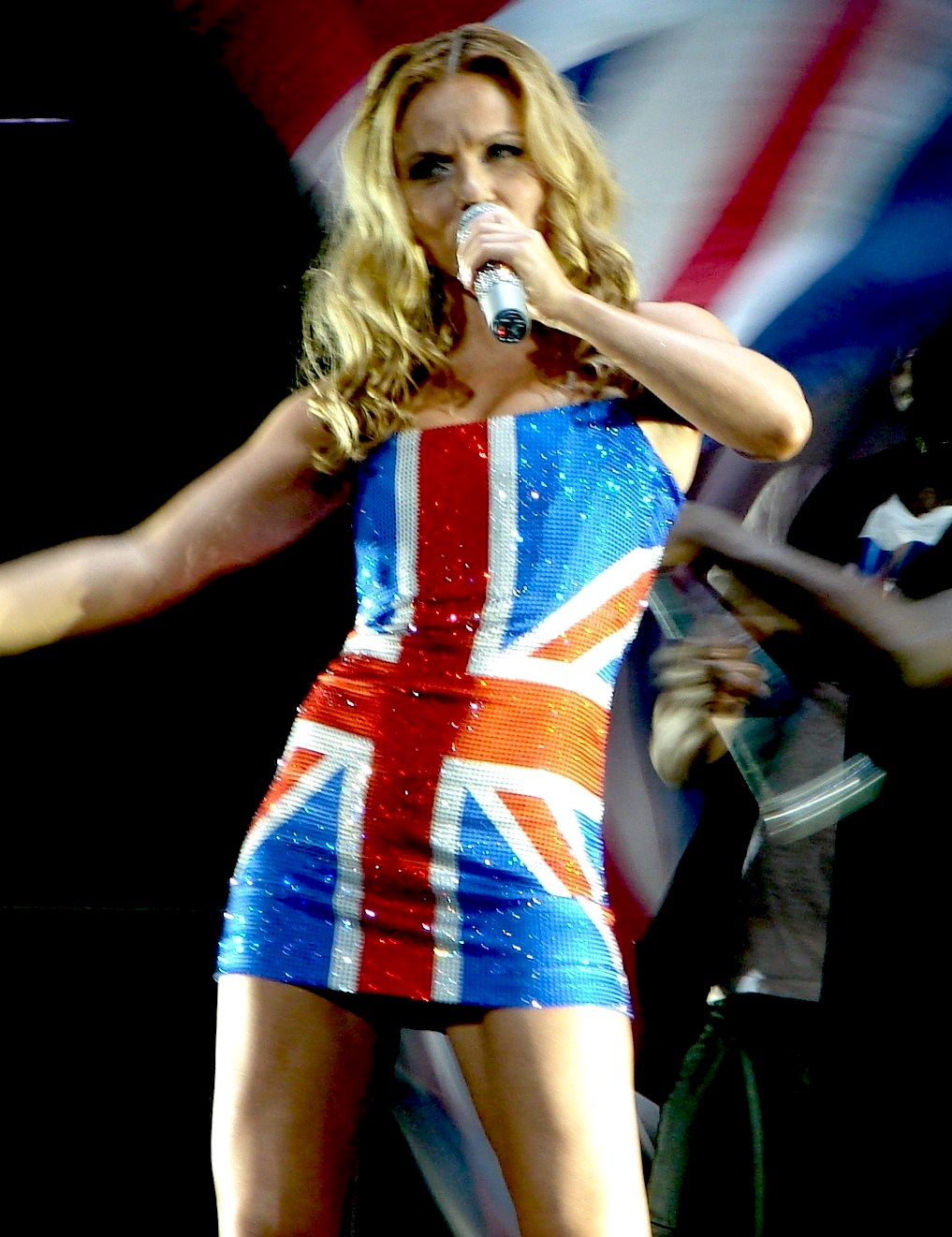
Halliwell wearing the Union Jack dress remake in 2007 during the Return of the Spice Girls Tour

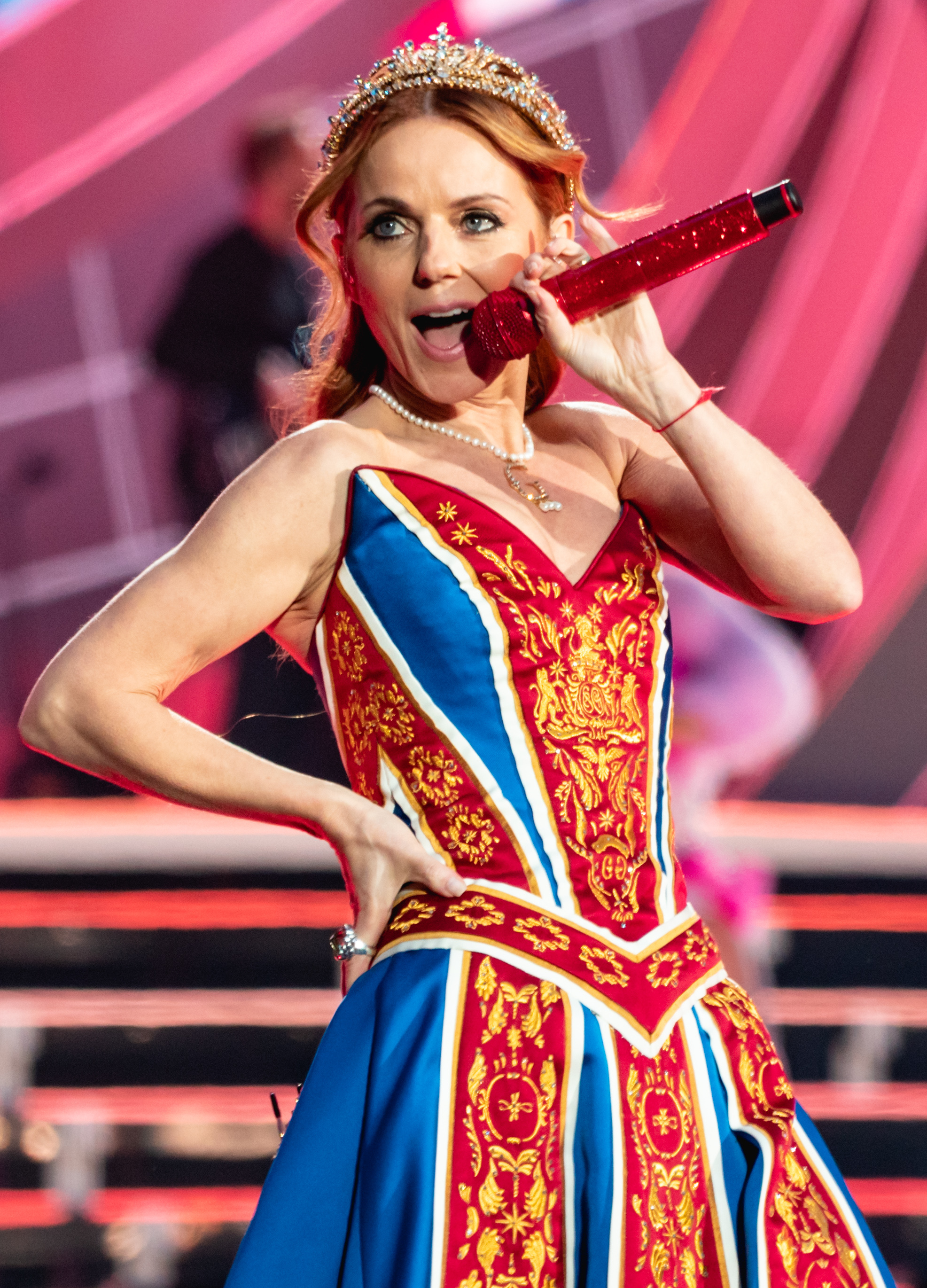
Halliwell wearing a floor length Union Jack dress during the Spice World – 2019 Tour

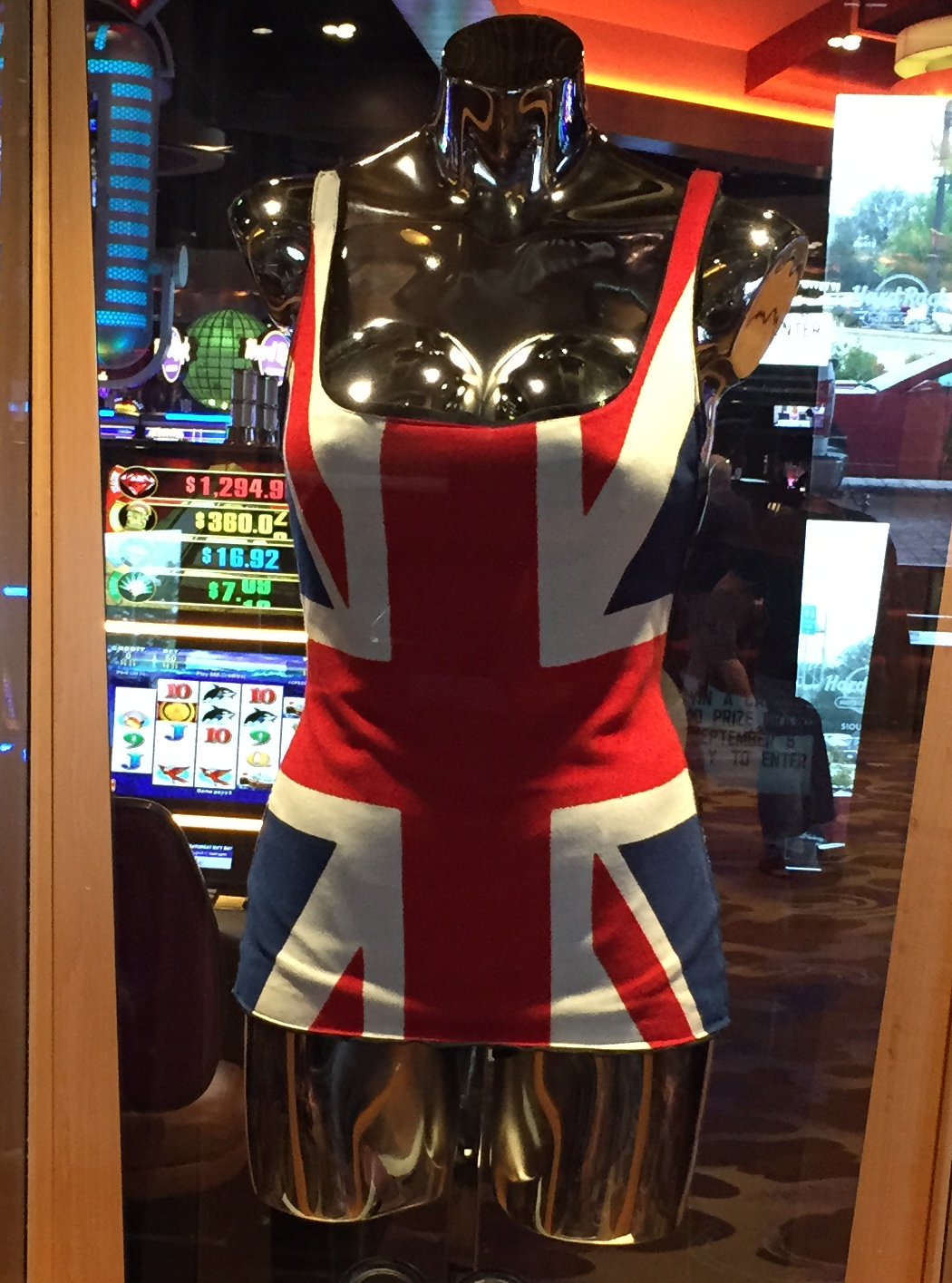
The original Union Jack dress as displayed at Hard Rock Hotel & Casino Las Vegas

== See also ==
- List of individual dresses
