= If Only (book) =

1999 autobiography by Geri Halliwell

- Author: Geri Halliwell
- Language: English
- Subject: Geri Halliwell
- Genre: Biography
- Publisher: Delacorte Press
- Publication date: 19 October 1999
- Publication place: United Kingdom
- Media type: Print (Hardcover and Paperback)
- Pages: 400
- ISBN: 0-385-33475-3

If Only is an autobiography by English singer Geri Halliwell, chronicling her own life. The book was released on 19 October 1999, by Delacorte Press in the United Kingdom. If Only chronicles the singer's rise to international fame as a member of the Spice Girls, while also documenting her struggle to overcome the eating disorder bulimia and her breast cancer. She found the experience of committing her memories to paper "cathartic", and reckons the result is "a real honest, emotional story".

Halliwell donated US$804,000 she received as an advance for the book to the charity Breast Cancer Care, a London-based organization that provides information and services for those affected by breast cancer and their families. The book topped the best-sellers list and sold over 200,000 copies in the United Kingdom alone as of 2000.
