= Spice World – 2019 Tour =

2019 concert tour by the Spice Girls

- Continental tour by Spice Girls
- Promotional poster for the tour
- Location: Europe
- Start date: 24 May 2019
- End date: 15 June 2019
- Legs: 1
- No. of shows: 13
- Supporting act: Jess Glynne
- Attendance: 697,357
- Box office: US$78,203,580

Spice Girls concert chronology
- The Return of the Spice Girls Tour (2007–08); Spice World – 2019 Tour (2019)

Spice World – 2019 Tour was the fourth and last concert tour by English girl-group the Spice Girls, and the group’s first large-stadium tour. It was the group's only tour without Victoria Beckham, and only visited cities in Great Britain and Ireland. Spice World commenced on 24 May 2019 at Croke Park, Dublin, to a sold-out crowd of over 74,000 people, and ended on 15 June 2019 at Wembley Stadium, London, after three dates performed for over 220,000 fans. Across the 13 sold-out dates, the tour produced almost 700,000 spectators and earned $78.2 million in ticket sales.

The three-night sellout run at Wembley Stadium was the highest-grossing engagement of the year, winning the 2019 Billboard Live Music Award for Top Boxscore.

== Background ==
Spice World was the fourth concert tour by the Spice Girls, and marked the group's first performance together since the 2012 Summer Olympics closing ceremony. It was also the group's first tour without Victoria Beckham, who declined to take part due to other commitments.

On 10 November 2018 several ticket-selling websites, such as Ticketmaster and See Tickets, crashed due to the overwhelming volume of people attempting to buy tickets. Ticketmaster later stated that at one point, over 700,000 fans were simultaneously attempting to purchase tickets, making it their busiest sale ever. The six original dates sold out within minutes, prompting the group to add additional dates in Manchester and London. More dates were soon announced to take place in Coventry and Cardiff due to further demand. On 16 November, a show in Dublin's Croke Park was announced, the band’s first in Ireland in 21 years. Consequently, the tour was renamed to Spice World – 2019 Tour.

== Accolades ==
The three-night sellout stand at Wembley Stadium was the highest-grossing engagement of the year, winning the 2019 Billboard Live Music Award for Top Boxscore.

== Set list ==
This set list is representative of the 24 May 2019 show in Croke Park, Dublin. It may not represent all dates of the tour.

1. "Spice Up Your Life"
2. "If U Can't Dance"
3. "Who Do You Think You Are"
4. "Do It"
5. "Something Kinda Funny"
6. "Move Over" (interlude)
7. "Holler"
8. "Viva Forever"
9. "Let Love Lead the Way"
10. "Goodbye"
11. "Never Give Up on the Good Times"
12. "We Are Family"
13. "Love Thing"
14. "The Lady Is a Vamp"
15. "Too Much"
16. "Say You'll Be There"
17. "2 Become 1"
18. "Stop"
19. "Mama"
20. "Wannabe"

== Tour dates ==
List of concerts, showing date, city, country, venue and opening act
Date	City	Country	Venue	Opening act	Attendance	Revenue
Europe
24 May 2019	Dublin	Ireland	Croke Park	Jess Glynne	74,186 / 74,186	$8,070,740
27 May 2019	Cardiff	Wales	Principality Stadium	Jess Glynne	50,215 / 50,215	$4,716,720
29 May 2019	Manchester	England	Etihad Stadium	Jess Glynne	150,955 / 150,955	$16,507,300
31 May 2019	Manchester	England	Etihad Stadium	Jess Glynne	150,955 / 150,955	$16,507,300
1 June 2019	Manchester	England	Etihad Stadium	Jess Glynne	150,955 / 150,955	$16,507,300
3 June 2019	Coventry	England	Ricoh Arena	Jess Glynne	69,748 / 69,748	$7,168,390
4 June 2019	Coventry	England	Ricoh Arena	Jess Glynne	69,748 / 69,748	$7,168,390
6 June 2019	Sunderland	England	Stadium of Light	Jess Glynne	45,429 / 45,429	$4,512,900
8 June 2019	Edinburgh	Scotland	Murrayfield Stadium	Jess Glynne	55,211 / 55,211	$6,038,050
10 June 2019	Bristol	England	Ashton Gate Stadium	Jess Glynne	29,642 / 29,642	$3,618,380
13 June 2019	London	England	Wembley Stadium	Jess Glynne	221,971 / 221,971	$27,571,100
14 June 2019	London	England	Wembley Stadium	Jess Glynne	221,971 / 221,971	$27,571,100
15 June 2019	London	England	Wembley Stadium	Jess Glynne	221,971 / 221,971	$27,571,100
Total					697,357 / 697,357 (100%)	$78,203,580

== Personnel ==
Vocals

- Mel B
- Emma Bunton
- Geri Halliwell
- Melanie C

Band

- Ricci Riccardi – Musical Director, drums
- Louis Riccardi – Guitars
- Dave Troke – Bass guitar
- Ayo "Ayce" Oyerinde – Keyboards
- Karlos Edwards – Percussion

Creative team

- Lee Lodge – Creative Director
- Jason Sherwood – Set Designer
- Paul Roberts – Choreographer and Stage Director
- Tim Routledge – Lighting Director
- Aries Moross – Art Director
- Gabriella Slade – Costume Designer

Production crew

- Tony Gittens – Production Manager
- David Odlum – Music Producer

Dancers

House of Scary

- Jo Dyce (Dance Captain)
- Shay Barclay
- Billy Sawyer
- Kane Horn
- Robyn Laud

House of Baby

- James Mulford
- Josh Huerta
- Michael Naylor
- Channelle George
- Maya King

House of Ginger

- Jake Leigh
- Kieran Daley-Ward
- Che Jones
- Dani Hampson
- Demi Rox

House of Sporty

- Mason Boyce
- Oli Metzler
- Mike Fellows
- Erin Dusek
- Majella Fitzgerald
