= Geri Halliwell discography =

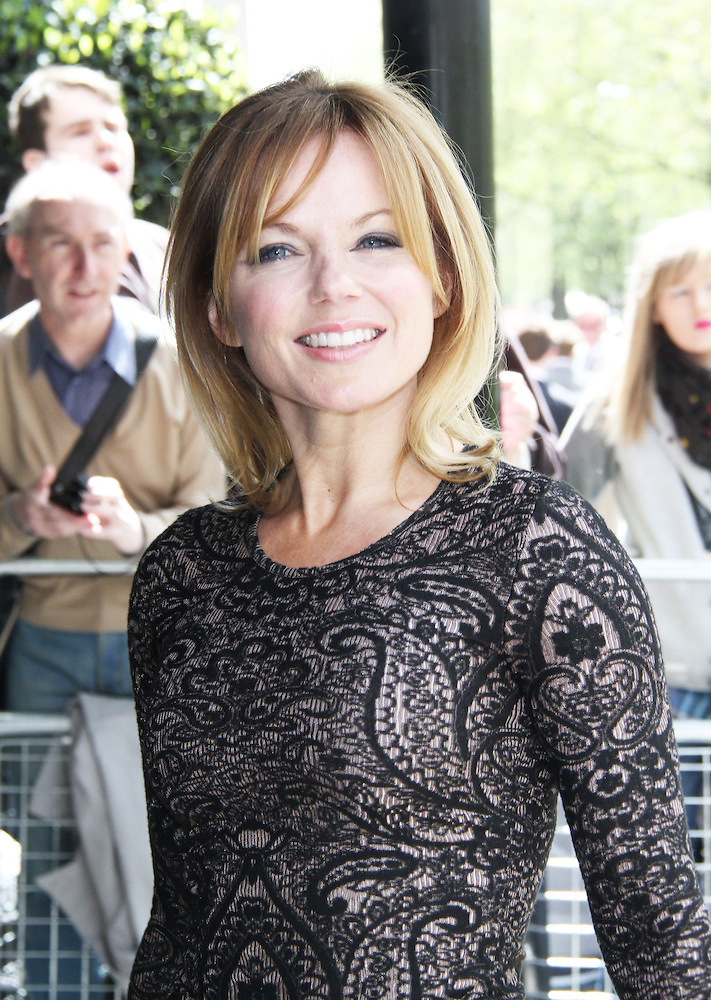
- Halliwell in 2013
- Studio albums: 3
- Extended plays: 1
- Compilation albums: 2
- Singles: 11
- Music videos: 11
- Promotional singles: 3

The discography of Geri Halliwell, an English pop music singer, contains three studio albums, nine singles, and ten music videos. In 1999, Halliwell launched her solo career and released her debut album Schizophonic, with the lead single "Look at Me", produced by Absolute. "Look at Me" would go on to sell over one million copies worldwide followed by further number ones at the UK Singles Chart "Mi Chico Latino", "Lift Me Up" and "Bag It Up". "Look at Me" was released to radio in the United States in late 1999, receiving limited airplay. With only a radio single, Schizophonic debuted at number forty-two on the Billboard 200 before dropping out within the next month. The album was eventually certified Gold, distributing over 500,000 copies. "Mi Chico Latino" did not have a big impact on American radio, and no further singles from Schizophonic or albums were released in the United States.

In 2001, Halliwell followed up with her second album, Scream If You Wanna Go Faster. It also included her cover version of the Weather Girls' 1983 hit, "It's Raining Men", used on the Bridget Jones's Diary film soundtrack. The song also won her the International Song of the Year award at the 2002 NRJ Music Awards. The singles that followed, "Scream If You Wanna Go Faster" and "Calling", reached, respectively, number eight and number seven in the United Kingdom. Halliwell released a special French edition of the single, entitled "Au Nom de L'amour".

In late 2004, Halliwell made a return to music with the single "Ride It", which reached number four in the United Kingdom and number one on the dance chart. However, several months elapsed before another single was released, during which time she was apparently instructed to record some new tracks for the as yet unreleased album by her record company, which was unhappy with the set list. The second single, "Desire", was released on 30 May 2005, reaching number 22 in the UK Singles Chart and number one on the UK Dance Chart. Released shortly after, the album Passion similarly received little attention from the public or critics, and stalled at number 41 on the UK Albums Chart. Halliwell's recording contract with EMI was subsequently not renewed, and in interviews Halliwell stated that she was not interested in recording another album at that time.

In February 2012, Halliwell confirmed she had been in the studio recording her fourth album since early 2011, and was nearly finished the collection. In 2012, Halliwell premiered a new single "Phenomenal Woman". A new album was expected for release in late 2013, but did ultimately not surface despite the release of another new song entitled "Half of Me", which was released in Australia.

== Albums ==
=== Studio albums ===
List of studio albums, with selected chart positions, sales figures and certifications
Title	Album details	Peak chart positions										Sales	Certifications
Title	Album details	UK	AUS	AUT	CAN	FRA	GER	IRE	ITA	NZ	SWI	Sales	Certifications
Schizophonic	Released: 7 June 1999; Label: EMI; Formats: Cassette, CD, digital download	4	22	30	15	50	52	63	17	19	31	WW: 2,000,000; US: 181,000	BPI: 2× Platinum; ARIA: Gold; FIMI: Gold; MC: Platinum; RIAA: Gold; SNEP: Gold
Scream If You Wanna Go Faster	Released: 14 May 2001; Label: EMI; Formats: Cassette, CD, digital download	5	55	30	43	133	29	15	15	—	22		BPI: Gold; SNEP: Gold
Passion	Released: 5 June 2005; Label: Innocent; Formats: Cassette, CD, digital download	41	—	—	—	—	—	—	49	—	—	UK: 10,000	
"—" denotes releases that did not chart or were not released in that territory.

=== Compilation albums ===
List of compilation albums and details
Title	Details
Playlist	Released: 6 May 2016; Label: Parlophone, Warner; Format: digital download

== Singles ==
=== As main artist ===
List of singles, with selected chart positions and certifications
Title	Year	Peak chart positions										Certifications	Album
Title	Year	UK	AUS	BEL	FRA	GER	IRE	ITA	NL	NZ	SWI	Certifications	Album
"Look at Me"	1999	2	3	12	27	22	3	5	24	1	15	BPI: Gold; ARIA: Gold; IFPI SWE: Gold	Schizophonic
"Mi Chico Latino"	1999	1	43	52	40	28	9	4	16	—	26	BPI: Gold	Schizophonic
"Lift Me Up"	1999	1	75	56	—	77	15	—	71	23	—	BPI: Silver	Schizophonic
"Bag It Up"	2000	1	—	—	—	79	6	13	62	18	66	BPI: Silver	Schizophonic
"It's Raining Men"	2001	1	4	1	1	5	1	1	3	15	4	BPI: Gold; ARIA: Platinum; BEA: 2× Platinum; BVMI: Gold; IFPI SWE: Gold; IFPI SWI: Gold; SNEP: Diamond	Scream If You Wanna Go Faster
"Scream If You Wanna Go Faster"	2001	8	40	18	—	67	17	13	66	—	62		Scream If You Wanna Go Faster
"Calling"	2001	7	—	53	22	48	37	26	—	—	21		Scream If You Wanna Go Faster
"Ride It"	2004	4	63	53	—	73	19	—	—	—	63		Passion
"Desire"	2005	22	78	59	—	97	38	19	—	—	—		Passion
"Half of Me"	2013	—	281	—	—	—	—	—	—	—	—		Non-album singles
"Angels in Chains"	2017	— (Note: "Angels in Chains" did not enter the Official UK Top 100 Chart; it peaked at number 63 on the Official Singles Downloads Chart Top 100.)	—	—	—	—	—	—	—	—	—		Non-album singles
"—" denotes releases that did not chart or were not released in that territory.

=== As featured artist ===
List of singles as featured artist, showing year released, selected chart positions and originating album
Title	Year	Peak chart positions							Album
Title	Year	UK	AUS	AUT	FRA	HUN	IRE	SWI	Album
"Bridge over Troubled Water" (amongst Artists for Grenfell)	2017	1	53	32	111	31	25	28	non-album single

=== Promotional singles ===
List of promotional singles, showing year released and originating album
Title	Year	Album
"Goodnight Kiss"	1999	Schizophonic
"Walkaway"	1999	Schizophonic
"Circles Round the Moon"	2001	Scream If You Wanna Go Faster

== Other appearances ==
List of other appearances, showing year released and originating album
Title	Year	Album
"G.A.Y."	1999	Flawless
"These Boots Are Made for Walkin'"	2000	Rugrats in Paris: The Movie
"Perhaps, Perhaps, Perhaps"	2001	America's Sweethearts
"Circles Round the Moon"	2002	Almighty Remix Showreel
"100% Pure Love"	2005	Almighty Showreel

== Music videos ==
List of music videos, showing year released and director
Title	Year	Director
"Look at Me"	1999	Vaughan Arnell
"Mi Chico Latino"	1999	Doug Nichol
"Lift Me Up"	1999	Howard Greenhalgh
"Bag It Up"	2000	Dawn Shadforth
"It's Raining Men"	2001	Jim Canty, Jake-Sebastian Wynne
"Scream If You Wanna Go Faster"	2001	Jim Canty, Jake-Sebastian Wynne
"Calling"	2001	Pierluca De Carlo
"Ride It"	2004	Luca Tommassini
"Desire"	2005	Andy Morahan
"Half of Me"	2013	Lawrance Lim
"Angels in Chains"	2017	—N/a
