= Playlist (Geri Halliwell album) =

Compilation album by Geri Halliwell
- Released: 6 May 2016
- Recorded: 1998–2004
- Length: 73:18
- Label: Parlophone; Warner Bros. Records

Geri Halliwell chronology
Passion (2005)	Playlist (2016)

Playlist is a digital-only compilation by English singer Geri Halliwell, released on 6 May 2016 by Parlophone. The album track listing comprises her nine UK singles, a selection of songs from her first three studio albums and b-sides that have never appeared on a studio album before.

== Track listing ==
No.	Title	Writer(s)	Taken from	Length
1.	"It's Raining Men"	Paul Jabara; Paul Shaffer	Scream If You Wanna Go Faster	4:14
2.	"Mi Chico Latino"	Geri Halliwell; Andy Watkins; Paul Wilson	Schizophonic	3:14
3.	"Ride It (Single Version)"	Geri Halliwell; Kotecha; Larossi; Andreas "Quiz" Romdhane	Passion	3:49
4.	"Scream If You Wanna Go Faster"	Geri Halliwell; Rick Nowels	Scream If You Wanna Go Faster	3:27
5.	"These Boots Are Made for Walkin'"	Lee Hazlewood	"Bag It Up" (CD single)	3:03
6.	"Lift Me Up"	Tracy Ackerman; Geri Halliwell; Andy Watkins; Paul Wilson	Schizophonic	3:51
7.	"Getting Better"	Geri Halliwell; Peter-John Vettese	"Calling" (CD single)	3:09
8.	"Look at Me"	Geri Halliwell; Andy Watkins; Paul Wilson	Schizophonic	4:32
9.	"Desire (Single Version)"	Geri Halliwell; Henrik Johan Korpi; Terry Ronald; Mathias Wollo	Passion	3:22
10.	"Circles Round the Moon"	Tracy Ackerman; Geri Halliwell; Andy Watkins; Paul Wilson	Scream If You Wanna Go Faster	3:59
11.	"Destiny"	Geri Halliwell; Rick Nowels	"Calling" (CD single)	4:31
12.	"Breaking Glass"	Geri Halliwell; Rick Nowels	"Scream If You Wanna Go Faster" (CD single)	3:41
13.	"Bag It Up"	Geri Halliwell; Andy Watkins; Paul Wilson	Schizophonic	3:45
14.	"Perhaps, Perhaps, Perhaps"	Joseph Davis; Osvaldo Farrés	"Bag It Up" (CD single)	2:21
15.	"Brave New World"	Geri Halliwell	Scream If You Wanna Go Faster (Japanese bonus track)	4:12
16.	"Surrender Your Groove"	Geri Halliwell; Henrik Johan Korpi; Terry Ronald; Mathias Wollo	Passion	2:58
17.	"Love Is the Only Light"	Jörgen Eloffson; Geri Halliwell; Stephen Lipson	Scream If You Wanna Go Faster	3:27
18.	"Don't Call Me Baby"	Geri Halliwell; Andy Watkins; Paul Wilson	Scream If You Wanna Go Faster	3:42
19.	"Feel the Fear"	Geri Halliwell; Andy Watkins; Paul Wilson	Passion	4:15
20.	"Calling (WIP 'Coeur De Lion' Edit)"	Geri Halliwell; Peter-John Vettese	"Calling" (CD single)	3:46
Total length:				73:18
