= Half of Me =

Half of Me may refer to:

- "Half of Me" (Geri Halliwell song), 2013
- "Half of Me" (Thomas Rhett and Riley Green song), 2022
- "Half of Me", a song by Chantal Kreviazuk from the 2009 album Plain Jane
- "Half of Me", a song by Rihanna from the 2012 album Unapologetic
