= Ride It =

Ride It may refer to:

- "Ride It" (Geri Halliwell song), 2004
- "Ride It" (Jay Sean song), 2008
