= Big Girls Don't Cry (The Weather Girls album) =

Studio album by the Weather Girls
- Released: 1985
- Genre: Soul; pop soul; dance
- Length: 32:25
- Label: Columbia
- Producer: Hank Medress; Jeff Kent

The Weather Girls chronology
Success (1983)	Big Girls Don't Cry (1985)	Megatonnage (1985)

Big Girls Don't Cry is an album by American music duo the Weather Girls, released in 1985. It was the group's second of three albums on Columbia Records. The music drew on influences from 1960s sounds. It was less successful than its predecessor, Success (1983).

== Critical reception ==
Professional ratings
Review scores
Source	Rating
AllMusic	3/5 stars
Robert Christgau	B

Writing for AllMusic, Ron Wynn gave a mixed review to the record, describing the songs on it as "formula pop-soul and dance filler." Wynn also stated that group "never really were allowed to showcase their real personalities or styles." Music critic Robert Christgau thought that the duo "takes it one step further and make soul a cartoon, with the title cut the masterstroke." Christgau further commented: "They'll cop material anywhere--debut single's from Jesse Winchester. And if at first their tricks seem inspired, by the time you get to Creedence and Neil Sedaka they're beginning to sound obvious."

== Track listing ==
1. "Lock Me Up" (Doug James, Michael Bolton) – 4:16
2. "Big Girls Don't Cry" (Bob Crewe, Bob Gaudio) – 3:25
3. "Well-A-Wiggy" (Jesse Winchester) – 4:31
4. "No One Can Love You More Than Me" (Terry Britten, Billy Livsey) – 4:55
5. "Down on the Corner" (John Fogerty) – 3:56
6. "March" (Peter Zizzo) – 3:39
7. "Laughter in the Rain" (Neil Sedaka, Phil Cody) – 3:15
8. "You Can Do It" (Evie Sands, Richard Germinaro, Ben Weisman) – 4:28

== Personnel ==
The Weather Girls

- Izora Armstead - lead vocals
- Martha Wash - lead vocals

Musicians

- Elliott Randall, Georg Wadenius, Scott Zito - electric guitar
- Elliott Randall, Jesse Winchester - acoustic guitar
- David Sanborn - alto saxophone
- Gregg Mangiafico - synthesizer programming
- Leon Pendarvis – acoustic piano, drum and synthesizer programming, arrangements
- Sammy Merendino - drum programming
- Jimmy Maelen - additional percussion
- Carl Hall, Izora Armstead, Martha Wash, Ula Hedwig - backing vocals

Technical

- Joe Venneri – audio engineering, associate producer, mixing
- Jeff Kent – producer, mixing
- Hank Medress – producer
- Charles Koppelman – executive producer
- John Berg - art direction
- Gary Heery - photography
