= Success (The Weather Girls album) =

Studio album by the Weather Girls
- Released: January 22, 1983
- Recorded: June–August 1982
- Studio: Hit Factory, New York City; Mediasound, New York City; Music Farm, New York City
- Genre: Soul; disco; gospel; pop
- Length: 32:21
- Label: Columbia
- Producer: Paul Jabara, Jerry Solomon

The Weather Girls chronology
Backatcha (as The Two Tons) (1980)	Success (1983)	Big Girls Don't Cry (1985)

Singles from Success
- 1. "It's Raining Men" Released: September 10, 1982

Professional ratings
Review scores
Source	Rating
AllMusic	4.5/5 stars
Robert Christgau	B+

Success is the third studio album by the American dance duo the Weather Girls and their first under that name. The album includes the group's biggest hit, "It's Raining Men", which peaked at number one on the U.S. Dance chart, number 46 on the U.S. Pop chart, and 34 on the U.S. R&B chart.

== Track listing ==
1. "Success" (Bob Esty, Paul Jabara) – 6:10
2. "Hungry for Love" (Paul Jabara) – 4:57
3. "Dear Santa (Bring Me a Man This Christmas)" (Paul Jabara, Paul Shaffer) – 6:29
4. "Hope" (Bob Esty, Paul Jabara) – 4:05
5. "It's Raining Men" (Paul Jabara, Paul Shaffer) – 5:26
6. "I'm Gonna Wash That Man Right Outa My Hair" (Richard Rodgers, Oscar Hammerstein II) – 5:14

== Personnel ==
The Weather Girls

- Izora Armstead – lead vocals
- Martha Wash – lead vocals

Additional personnel

- Chris Parker, Carlos Vega, Buddy Williams – drums
- Neil Jason, Leland Sklar – bass
- Ray Chew, Paul Delph, Bob Esty, Greg Mathieson, Leon Pendarvis, Paul Shaffer, Ed Walsh – keyboards, synthesizer, piano
- Michael Landau, Jeff Mironov, David Spinozza, Georg Wadenius – guitar
- Patti Austin, Peggi Blu, Carmine and the Granito Brothers, Diva Gray, Lani Groves, Yvonne Lewis, Ullanda McCullough, Robin Clark, Stephanie Spruill, Julia Tillman Waters, Maxine Willard Waters, Deniece Williams, Zenobia – backing vocals
- Vocals arranged by Paul Jabara
- Rhythm arrangements: Ray Chew
- Horns arranged by Ray Chew and Harold Wheeler
- Strings arranged by Harold Wheeler

Production

- Produced by Paul Jabara and Jerry Solomon
- Executive producer: Charles Koppelman
- Engineers: Jerr Solomon, Randy Tominaga
- Assistant engineers: John Davenport, Peter Hefter, Nicky Kalliongis
- Mixing: Randy Tominaga
- Mastering: Jose Rodriguez
- Photography: Francesco Scavullo
