= Passion (Geri Halliwell album) =

2005 album by Geri Halliwell

Studio album by Geri Halliwell
- Released: 6 June 2005
- Studios: Area 21, Olympic Studios, Sphere Studios, Whitfield Street Studios, Thriller Jill's and AM Studios (London, UK); B13 (Cookham, UK); Murlyn Studios, Khabang Studio and Cosmos Studios (Stockholm, Sweden)
- Genres: Pop; jazz; dance-pop; electropop
- Length: 42:39
- Labels: Innocent; EMI
- Producers: Peter-John Vettese; Korpi & Blackcell; Ian Masterson; Absolute; Steve Power; Quiz & Larossi

Geri Halliwell chronology
Scream If You Wanna Go Faster (2001)	Passion (2005)	Playlist (2016)

Singles from Passion
- 1. "Ride It" Released: 22 November 2004; 2. "Desire" Released: 30 May 2005

Passion is the third studio album by English singer Geri Halliwell. It was released on 6 June 2005 by Innocent Records.

Two singles were released from the album: "Ride It", which peaked at number four on the UK Singles Chart and number three on the Spanish and Scottish charts; and "Desire", which charted at number 22 in the UK.

The album received mixed reviews from critics and was a commercial disappointment, peaking at number 41 with 5,432 copies sold and charting for only one week on the UK Albums Chart. After one year of release, sales had reached 10,000 in the UK.

== Background ==
Halliwell wrote many songs between 2001 and 2004 with a number of producers. Halliwell wanted to record the track "Some Girls" (written by Richard X and Hannah Robinson) for the album, but the track was instead given to Rachel Stevens.

Halliwell described the album as "a journey through a range of extreme emotions from passion and love through to fear and hope". According to her, Passion can be seen to chart her development as both a vocalist and songwriter. For the singer it had been a matter of "finding out who I am not as much as I what I am. I think this album catches me at a real transitional point as a songwriter".

== Promotion ==
A documentary promoting Passion, titled There's Something About Geri, was premiered by Channel 5 on 15 May 2005. It covered her life and career and following her from Moscow to Milan and Britain as she prepares for a relaunch of her singing career. The documentary attracted an audience of 1.1 million viewers, garnering above-average Sunday ratings for the network. Despite rating success, it was criticised by the media for showing a "self-obsessed, painfully vain little girl in need of constant mollycoddling". She regretted doing the documentary film, commenting, "I shouldn't have done it! Even thinking about it makes me cringe!"

A tour had been planned in order to promote the album, but was cancelled.

== Singles ==
"Ride It" was released on 22 November 2004 by Innocent Records as the first single from the album. "Ride It" was commercially successful, peaking at number four in the UK, number three in Spain and Scotland.

"Desire" was released on 30 May 2005 as the album's second and final single. It peaked at number 22 on the UK Singles Chart, becoming the lowest-peaking single of Halliwell's solo career to date. To promote the single, Halliwell performed the song on Top of the Pops, Top Gear, CD:UK, The Footy Show, Ministry of Mayhem, Popworld and GMTV.

== Critical reception ==
Professional ratings
Review scores
Source	Rating
AllMusic	3/5 stars
entertainment.ie	3/5 stars
Hot Press	mixed
The Guardian	2/5 stars
Now	1/5 stars
Yahoo! Music	4/10 stars

Passion received generally mixed reviews from music critics. John Lucas from AllMusic wrote that the album was an improvement over her previous record, Scream If You Wanna Go Faster. Talia Kraines from BBC Music praised Halliwell for not trying to make a serious "moody and mysterious" record. A review from entertainment.ie described the album as a "lightweight, summery pop record" with "slick" production. Generally, the uptempo, dance-pop tracks and ballads were praised while more criticism was given to the jazzier songs such as the title track. In particular, critics were complimentary towards the track "Love Never Loved Me", with Kraines calling it a "standout" and Lucas describing it as "possibly the best thing she has ever done outside of the Spice Girls". Both Lucas and Kraines were critical of the title track and "So I Give Up on Love", with Lucas writing: "Halliwell just does not have the range for this kind of material".

In contrast, Betty Clark from The Guardian described the title track as a "comfortable fit" but was critical towards "Love Never Loved Me", negatively comparing it to songs by Kylie Minogue and describing it as "lifeless, generic disco". Halliwell's vocals were also generally noted as an improvement on the album. Kraines singled out the ballad "Let Me Love You More" as an example of this. Clark described it as a "good pop song for grown-ups" and Lucas said that the song had a "pretty arrangement" that "overcomes her vocal shortcomings". Kraines wrote that it was "stunning" and the best track on the album, noting that you can "really hear how much Geri's voice has improved in the last 4 years" on the track. In a negative review, Tom Townsend from Yahoo! Music wrote that her vocals sounded worse on the record than on previous releases.

== Track listing ==
Passion track listing
No.	Title	Writer(s)	Producer(s)	Length
1.	"Passion"	Geri Halliwell; Peter-John Vettese	Vettese	2:56
2.	"Desire"	Halliwell; Korpi; Wollo; Terry Ronald	Korpi & Blackcell	3:22
3.	"Love Never Loved Me"	Halliwell; Hannah Robinson; Ian Masterson	Masterson	4:04
4.	"Feel the Fear"	Halliwell; Andy Watkins; Paul Wilson	Absolute	4:15
5.	"Superstar"	Halliwell; Guy Chambers	Steve Power	3:28
6.	"Surrender Your Groove"	Halliwell; Korpi; Wollo; Ronald	Korpi & Blackcell	2:58
7.	"Ride It"	Halliwell; Quiz; Larossi; Savan Kotecha	Quiz & Larossi; Masterson	3:46
8.	"There's Always Tomorrow"	Halliwell; Robinson; Masterson; Holweger	Masterson	3:48
9.	"Let Me Love You More"	Halliwell; Robinson; Masterson	Masterson	4:06
10.	"Don't Get Any Better"	Halliwell; Tracy Ackerman; Watkins; Wilson	Absolute	3:23
11.	"Loving Me Back to Life"	Halliwell; Chambers	Power	3:24
12.	"So I Give Up on Love"	Halliwell; Vettese	Vettese	3:12
Total length:				42:39

== Personnel ==
- Geri Halliwell – vocals
- Peter-John Vettese – programming (1, 12), guitars (1), drums (1), backing vocals (1), keyboard programming (12), brass arrangements (12)
- Korpi & Blackcell – all other instruments (2, 6), arrangements (2, 6)
- Ben Dobie – programming (3, 7–9)
- Ian Masterson – programming (3, 7–9)
- Absolute – all other instruments (4, 10)
- Matthew Vaughan – keyboard programming (5)
- Josef Larossi – original instrumentation (7)
- Andreas Romdhane – original instrumentation (7)
- Magnus Lind – accordion (7)
- Dave Arch – acoustic piano (11)
- Richard Robson – programming (11)
- Mitch Dalton – acoustic guitar (1)
- Joe Holweger – guitars (3), electric guitar (8, 9), bass guitar (8)
- John Themis – guitars (4, 10)
- Guy Chambers – acoustic guitar (5), baritone guitar (5), bass guitar (5)
- Phil Palmer – nylon guitar (8), acoustic guitar (9)
- Tim Van der Kuil – guitars (11)
- Phil Spalding – bass guitar (5)
- Samuel Dixon – bass guitar (11)
- Anders Hedlund – live drums (2, 6)
- Andy Duncan – drum programming (5)
- Damon Wilson – drums (11)
- Frank Ricotti – percussion (11)
- Phil Todd – alto saxophone (12), flute (12)
- Dave Bishop – baritone saxophone (12)
- Chris "Snake" Davis – tenor saxophone (12), flute (12)
- John Barclay – trumpet (12)
- Noel Langley – trumpet (12)
- Simon Hale – string arrangements (1), brass arrangements (12), brass conductor (12)
- Christopher Slaski – string arrangements and conductor (3, 9)
- Nick Ingman – string arrangements (4, 11), string conductor (11)
- Perry Montague-Mason – string leader (1)
- Gavyn Wright – string leader (4, 11)
- The London Session Orchestra – strings (1, 4)
- Stevie Vann-Lange – additional vocal coach (1)
- Emma Holmgren – backing vocals (1, 6)
- Hannah Robinson – backing vocals (3, 7–9)
- Tracy Ackerman – backing vocals (4, 10)
- Andy Caine – backing vocals (4, 5)
- Molly Watkins – backing vocals (4)
- Claire Worrall – backing vocals (5, 11)
- Maria Diephuis – backing vocals (7)
- Mitch Stevens – backing vocals (7, 9)
- Gary Nuttall – backing vocals (11)

=== Production ===
- Chris Briggs – A&R
- Andrew Murabito – design
- Dean Freeman – photography
- Adventures In Music Management – management

Technical credits

- Tim Young – mastering at Metropolis Mastering (London, UK)
- Mark Evans – engineer (1, 12), mixing (1, 12)
- Korpi & Blackcell – recording (2, 6), mixing (6)
- Niklas Flyckt – mixing (2)
- Ben Dobie – mix engineer (3), engineer (7–9)
- Ian Masterson – mix engineer (3), engineer (7–9), mixing (7–9)
- Martin Harrington – mixing (3)
- Ash Howes – mixing (3)
- Mike Ross-Trevor – string recording (3)
- Steve Fitzmaurice – mixing (4, 10)
- Steve Power – mixing (5, 11)
- Richard Flack – Pro Tools engineer (5)
- Dave Naughton – Pro Tools engineer (5)
- Märten Eriksson – mix engineer (6)
- Alan Douglas – string recording (10)
- Steve Price – mixing (11)
- Jim Brumby – Pro Tools engineer (11)
- Rob Haggett – additional engineer (3)
- David Treahearn – additional engineer (3)
- Mark Reilly – mix assistant (4)
- Dan Porter – assistant mix engineer (5), assistant engineer (11)
- Stephen Sedgwick – mix assistant (10)
- Philippe Rose – string recording assistant (10)

== Charts ==
Chart performance for Passion
Chart (2005)	Peak position
Argentinian Albums (CAPIF)	17
Greek International Albums (IFPI)	37
Italian Albums (FIMI)	49
Scottish Albums (Official Charts)	56
UK Albums (Official Charts)	41
