= Tickled Pink =

Television show

Tickled Pink (full title Inside TV Land: Tickled Pink) was an hour-long American television special which aired multiple times during July, 2006, chronicled television shows that homosexuals have identified with over the years. The show featured such entertainers as Richard Andreoli, Kelsey Grammer, Sandra Bernhard, Diahann Carroll, Susan Saint James, Bruce Vilanch, Marc Cherry, Lynda Carter, Bob Mackie, Jean Smart, Jason Stuart, Frank DeCaro, Barbara Eden, Mike Gray, Carson Kressley, Rue McClanahan, Judy Gold, Thom Filicia, and Mario Cantone. Tickled Pink was produced for TV Land by Linda Ellerbee’s Lucky Duck Productions.

== Shows cited in Tickled Pink ==
In addition to The Golden Girls, Batman, and CHiPs, Maude, Xena: Warrior Princess, Will & Grace, Sex & the City, The Mary Tyler Moore Show, Designing Women, Friends, Ellen, The Simpsons, The Odd Couple, Laverne & Shirley, Cagney & Lacey, Kate & Allie, Wonder Woman, Dynasty, and Buffy the Vampire Slayer were also cited in Tickled Pink as shows that "became ‘homosensational’ ", providing gays with characters who were depicted as "strong, independent and outrageous" and whose "bond with their friends resonated with their own lives". According to NPR, the first shows to earn the honor were actresses from the 1970s, who may not have been gay but broke away from the happy homemaker mold that defined too many adult female roles in the medium's early years. "Mary Tyler Moore" fit the bill; so did "Maude," another 1970s sitcom starring Bea Arthur as the outspoken title character.

== Gay and lesbian subtext ==
According to producers and critics as well as fans of television shows that are perceived to have a sexually ambiguous or homosexual theme, such shows rely upon a subtext created through double entendres, situational irony, intentional ambiguity, and straightforward gay couplings.

=== Xena and Gabrielle ===
According to Liz Friedman, producer of Xena: Warrior Princess, the show’s writers played on the ambiguous relationship between Xena and her traveling companion, Gabrielle: "One episode starts with the camera looking at some bushes," Friedman, herself a lesbian, explains. "We hear Gabrielle asking, ‘How was that?’ Xena answers, ‘Very nice!’ Gabrielle says, ‘Really? I wasn’t sure,’ and Xena replies, ‘No, no, you’re doing great.’ Then we see them, [a]nd they’re fishing—naked!" "They’re such a perfect little butch-femme couple." However, the intent is not to affirm or to deny Xena’s lesbianism; rather, the show maintains an ambiguous position with regard to this question, Friedman declares, "the whole point behind subtext is that people can enjoy the show however they wish".

=== Oscar and Felix ===
According to some critics, the television situation comedy The Odd Couple, starring Jack Klugman and Tony Randall, also played upon the ambiguity of "two divorced, heterosexual men sharing a Manhattan apartment, where they cooked, cleaned (or refused to clean), bickered, and negotiated the dilemmas of everyday existence together," and "Randall’s uptight, opera-loving Felix" may have "functioned as a ‘stealth gay stereotype’ in the still-closeted world of '70s prime time." Alternatively, some critics contend, "if slobhood is code for heterosexuality and neatness for homosexuality (a trope that persists today in shows like Queer Eye for the Straight Guy), The Odd Couple might be read as an unconsummated love story between a straight and a gay man." Even during the airing of the show, executive producer, Garry Marshall, remembers that Midwestern focus groups were turned off by The Odd Couple because "they thought it was about homosexuals," and Klugman says that the show’s outtake reels contain "a lot of scenes of us kissing and hugging... because the network was concerned people thought Oscar and Felix were gay, and we were trying to make them nervous".

=== Wonder Woman and her Amazon tribe ===
Wonder Woman has long been popular among lesbians because the character lives in an all-female society of Amazons and bests men in combat. Wonder Woman repeats are scheduled for frequent broadcast on France’s "first [television] station aimed at homosexuals".

=== Batman and Robin ===
According to George Clooney, Batman is gay. In an interview with Barbara Walters, Clooney said that, as Batman, he wore "a rubber suit" with "rubber nipples" and, although he "could have played Batman straight," he preferred to portray the character as being homosexual. The portrayal of Batman as gay could have derived from psychiatrist Fredric Wertham’s 1954 observations about the comic book character and his partner, Robin the Boy Wonder.
