= Desire (Geri Halliwell song) =

2005 single by Geri Halliwell

Single by Geri Halliwell

from the album Passion
- B-side: "Lift Me Up" (K-Klass Phazerphunk Edit); "True Love Never Dies"
- Released: 30 May 2005
- Studio: Murlyn (Stockholm, Sweden)
- Genre: Dance-pop; electropop
- Length: 3:22
- Label: Innocent; Virgin
- Songwriters: Henrik Korpi; Mathias Wollo; Terry Ronald; Geri Halliwell
- Producer: Korpi & Blackcell

Geri Halliwell singles chronology
"Ride It" (2004)	"Desire" (2005)	"Half of Me" (2013)

Licensed audio
- "Desire" on YouTube

"Desire" is a song by English singer Geri Halliwell from her third solo studio album, Passion (2005). The song was written by Henrik Korpi, Mathias Wollo, Terry Ronald and Halliwell, and produced by Korpi & Blackcell. "Desire" metaphorically describes the persona as a feline with sexual desires.

The song was released on 30 May 2005 as the album's second and final single. It peaked at number 22 on the UK Singles Chart, becoming the lowest-peaking single of Halliwell's solo career to date. To promote the single, Halliwell performed the song on Top of the Pops, Top Gear, CD:UK, The Footy Show, Ministry of Mayhem, Popworld and GMTV.

== Music video ==
The music video for "Desire" was directed by Andy Morahan and edited by Claudia Wass. The video opens with Halliwell waking up at 7:10 a.m. to the sound of the alarm clock. After hopping out of bed, she walks to the refrigerator and grabs a bottle of milk, which she drinks suggestively, before leaving for work. On her way to work, a dog that is being walked by a woman suddenly starts to bark at Halliwell.

Upon arriving at work, she stares flirtatiously at her boss (played by actor Leon Ockenden), who is in his office. She stops by to hand him the folders he had previously asked her to take care of, and then proceeds to behave provocatively around him.

Right after leaving his office, Halliwell finds herself fantasising about him, which involves her crawling across his desk and drinking milk from a saucer. She then performs a choreography with other four women dressed as secretaries, intercut with scenes of her making out with her boss in his office. After waking up from her daydream, she notices her boss is leaving and decides to follow him home, where she turns into a black cat after entering through his window. The boss takes the cat in and pets it in his bed.

The video ends with Halliwell stopping her alarm clock at 7:11 a.m. and holding her pillow tight with a pleased look on her face, indicating that she had been dreaming the entire time.

== Track listings ==
- UK CD single 1 and German CD single
1. "Desire" – 3:21
2. "Lift Me Up" (K-Klass Phazerphunk Edit) – 4:10
- UK CD single 2
1. "Desire" – 3:21
2. "Desire" (Bimbo Jones Remix) – 6:30
3. "Desire" (Shanghai Surprize Remix) – 7:10
- UK DVD single
1. "Desire" (uncut video) – 3:25
2. "Ride It" (video) – 4:01
3. "Desire" (behind the scenes footage from the video) – 2:00
4. "True Love Never Dies" (photo gallery) – 3:36
- Australian CD single
1. "Desire" – 3:21
2. "Desire" (Bimbo Jones Remix Vocal) – 6:30
3. "Desire" (Shanghai Surprize Remix) – 7:10
4. "Lift Me Up" (K-Klass Phazerphunk Edit) – 4:10

== Credits and personnel ==
Credits adapted from the liner notes of Passion.

=== Recording locations ===
- Recorded at Murlyn Studios (Stockholm, Sweden)
- Mixed at Khabang Studio (Älvsjö, Sweden)
- Mastered at Metropolis Studios (London, England)

=== Personnel ===
- Geri Halliwell – vocals
- Korpi & Blackcell – production, arrangement, recording, all other instruments
- Niklas Flyckt – mixing
- Emma Holmgren – backing vocals
- Anders Hedlund – live drums
- Tim Young – mastering

== Charts ==
Chart performance for "Desire"
Chart (2005)	Peak position
Australia (ARIA)	78
Belgium (Ultratip Bubbling Under Flanders)	9
Germany (GfK)	97
Ireland (IRMA)	38
Italy (FIMI)	19
Romania (Romanian Top 100)	70
Scotland Singles (OCC)	21
UK Singles (OCC)	22

== Release history ==
Release history and formats for "Desire"
Region	Date	Format	Label(s)	Ref.
United Kingdom	30 May 2005	CD single	Innocent; Virgin	
Australia	27 June 2005	CD single	Innocent; Virgin	
Germany	27 June 2005	CD single	EMI	
