= Scream If You Wanna Go Faster (song) =

2001 single by Geri Halliwell

Single by Geri Halliwell

from the album Scream If You Wanna Go Faster
- B-side: "New Religion"; "Breaking Glass"
- Released: 30 July 2001
- Length: 3:24 (radio edit); 3:41 (album version)
- Label: EMI
- Songwriters: Geri Halliwell; Rick Nowels
- Producer: Rick Nowels

Geri Halliwell singles chronology
"It's Raining Men" (2001)	"Scream If You Wanna Go Faster" (2001)	"Calling" (2001)

Music video
- "Scream If You Wanna Go Faster" on YouTube

"Scream If You Wanna Go Faster" is a song by British singer Geri Halliwell from her second album of the same name (2001). It was released on 30 July 2001 as the second single from the album by EMI Records. Written by Halliwell and Rick Nowels on the day of her first recovery meeting for bulimia, she described the song as "the things I did to avoid staying still and deal with my seemings". It is Halliwell's most rock-based song to date, and was inspired by her listening to Led Zeppelin the previous summer as encouraged by close friend Robbie Williams.

The song received positive reviews by music critics, who complimented the singer's new style. Commercially, it peaked at No. 8 on the UK Singles Chart and reached the top 40 in Australia, Belgium (Flanders and Wallonia), Ireland, and Italy. The music video was directed by Jim Canty and Jake-Sebastian Wynne. To promote the single, Halliwell performed the song on Top of the Pops, Party in the Park, Musica Sí and Popkomm.

== Background ==
Geri Halliwell described "Scream If You Wanna Go Faster" as "by far the most rock'n'roll song I had ever recorded" ascribing its "adrenaline-packed" feel to her newfound enthusiasm for listening to Led Zeppelin as encouraged by her close friend, Robbie Williams. She also elaborated on the song: "The track is based on one of the themes of the album – the child within and the creative fun-loving person that often gets conditioned out of us. I'm just a big kid at heart".

== Critical reception ==
It received positive reviews by music critics, who complimented the singer's new style. Jon O'Brien from Billboard named it the 15th best solo single from a Spice Girl, and elaborated that the song "is perhaps her most under-rated single", and noted its "twangy surf-rock guitars, swirling Hammond organs and unabashedly nonsensical lyrics". NME gave the song a negative reception by saying: "This is not singing but the sound a seal makes when you run over its stomach in a Land Rover. She is living proof that there is no 'magic machine' in the studio that makes bad voices sound good. This is lyric writing courtesy of the magnetic poetry kit. It’s what happens when you apply the William Burroughs' cut-up technique to self-help manuals".

== Chart performance ==
The song entered the UK Singles Chart at its peak of No. 8, which became the lowest-charting single of Halliwell's career at the time. The single sold 27,458 copies during its first week and about 80,192 copies total in the United Kingdom.

== Music video ==
The accompanying music video for "Scream If You Wanna Go Faster" was directed by Jim Canty and Jake-Sebastian Wynne. Halliwell plays two characters in the video. She said, "It's kind of like Lara Croft meets Blondie. The Lara Croft character, she represents spirit and soul, a little more organic, more playful. Then the (Blondie) character on stage, she's a lot more aggressive and sexual and represents ego." Comparisons were made to the similarly-themed video for Victoria Beckham's single "Not Such an Innocent Girl"; Halliwell's spokesperson said: "There is no way Geri has seen Victoria's video".

The video begins with the Lara Croft Halliwell in a desert in a squat position. As the music starts, she begins to run through the rocks and down a hill before picking up a dune buggy and driving it. Halliwell then sees a cliff and as she reverses the dune buggy, it jumps off the cliff transforming into a space hovercraft racing with two men beside her. As the hovercraft reaches its destination, Halliwell goes inside an elevator which sinks rapidly. She's dancing in the elevator as it proceeds to drop down quickly into the stage where the other Halliwell (the Blondie type) is performing at a concert with her band. The Lara Croft Halliwell kicks the other and her female performers resume dancing along to the song. The video ends with Halliwell looking upon a hill, exhausted.

== Track listings ==
UK CD1

1. "Scream If You Wanna Go Faster" – 3:24
2. "New Religion" – 3:05
3. "Breaking Glass" – 3:37

UK CD2

1. "Scream If You Wanna Go Faster" (UK single version) – 3:24
2. "Scream If You Wanna Go Faster" (Sleaze Sisters Anthem mix edit) – 4:58
3. "Scream If You Wanna Go Faster" (Rob Searle remix edit) – 4:25
4. "Scream If You Wanna Go Faster" (Burnt remix) – 7:07

European CD single (version 1)

1. "Scream If You Wanna Go Faster" – 3:24
2. "New Religion" – 3:05

European CD single (version 2)

1. "Scream If You Wanna Go Faster" – 3:24
2. "It's Raining Men" (album version) – 4:19

Australian CD single

1. "Scream If You Wanna Go Faster" (album version) – 3:24
2. "Scream If You Wanna Go Faster" (In the Name of Charlie Rapino mix) – 5:02
3. "Scream If You Wanna Go Faster" (Sleaze Sisters Anthem mix) – 7:57
4. "Scream If You Wanna Go Faster" (Burnt remix) – 7:08
5. "It's Raining Men" (Almighty mix) – 8:13

== Personnel ==
Personnel are taken from the Scream If You Wanna Go Faster album booklet.

- Geri Halliwell – writing
- Rick Nowels – writing, acoustic and electric guitars, bass, keyboards, production
- Rusty Anderson – electric guitar
- Charles Judge – keyboards
- Greg Kurstin – keyboards, Farfisa organ
- Wayne Rodrigues – drum programming, Pro Tools editing
- Dave Way – mixing
- Randy Wine – recording
- Chris Garcia – recording
- David Dale – recording

== Charts ==
=== Weekly charts ===
Chart (2001)	Peak position
Australia (ARIA)	40
Belgium (Ultratop 50 Flanders)	18
Belgium (Ultratop 50 Wallonia)	20
Europe (Eurochart Hot 100)	37
Germany (GfK)	67
Ireland (IRMA)	17
Italy (FIMI)	9
Netherlands (Single Top 100)	66
Scotland Singles (Official Charts)	9
Switzerland (Schweizer Hitparade)	62
UK Singles (Official Charts)	8

=== Year-end charts ===
Chart (2001)	Position
UK Singles (OCC)	154

== Release history ==
Region	Date	Format(s)	Label(s)	Ref(s).
United Kingdom	30 July 2001	CD; cassette	EMI	
Australia	10 September 2001	CD	EMI	
