= It's Raining Men =

1982 single by the Weather Girls

- 1982 US 12-inch vinyl picture sleeve (also used for some original overseas releases)

Single by the Weather Girls

from the album Success
- Written: 1979
- Released: September 10, 1982
- Recorded: 1982 (Note: The album was recorded during the summer of 1982, and one of its tracks, "It's Raining Men", was also recorded around that time.)
- Genre: Hi-NRG; post-disco; gospel
- Length: 5:24 (album version); 3:34 (single edit); 4:55 (video version)
- Label: CBS; Columbia
- Songwriters: Paul Jabara; Paul Shaffer
- Producers: Paul Jabara; Bob Esty

The Weather Girls singles chronology
"Never Like This" (1981)	"It's Raining Men" (1982)	"Success" (1983)

Music video
- "It's Raining Men" on YouTube

"It's Raining Men" is a song by the American disco duo the Weather Girls from their third studio album, Success (1983). It was released as the album's lead single on September 10, 1982, through Columbia Records and CBS Records International. Paul Jabara wrote the song in collaboration with Paul Shaffer, and produced the song in collaboration with Bob Esty. "It's Raining Men" incorporates elements of soul and 1970s-style electronic dance music.

"It's Raining Men" was a number-one dance hit in the United States, and reached the top ten in various other countries worldwide. VH1 listed the song as one of the Greatest Songs of the 1980s as well as one of the Greatest Songs of the 2000s decade. At the 26th Annual Grammy Awards (1983), "It's Raining Men" received a nomination for Best R&B Performance by a Duo or Group with Vocals.

== Development and production ==
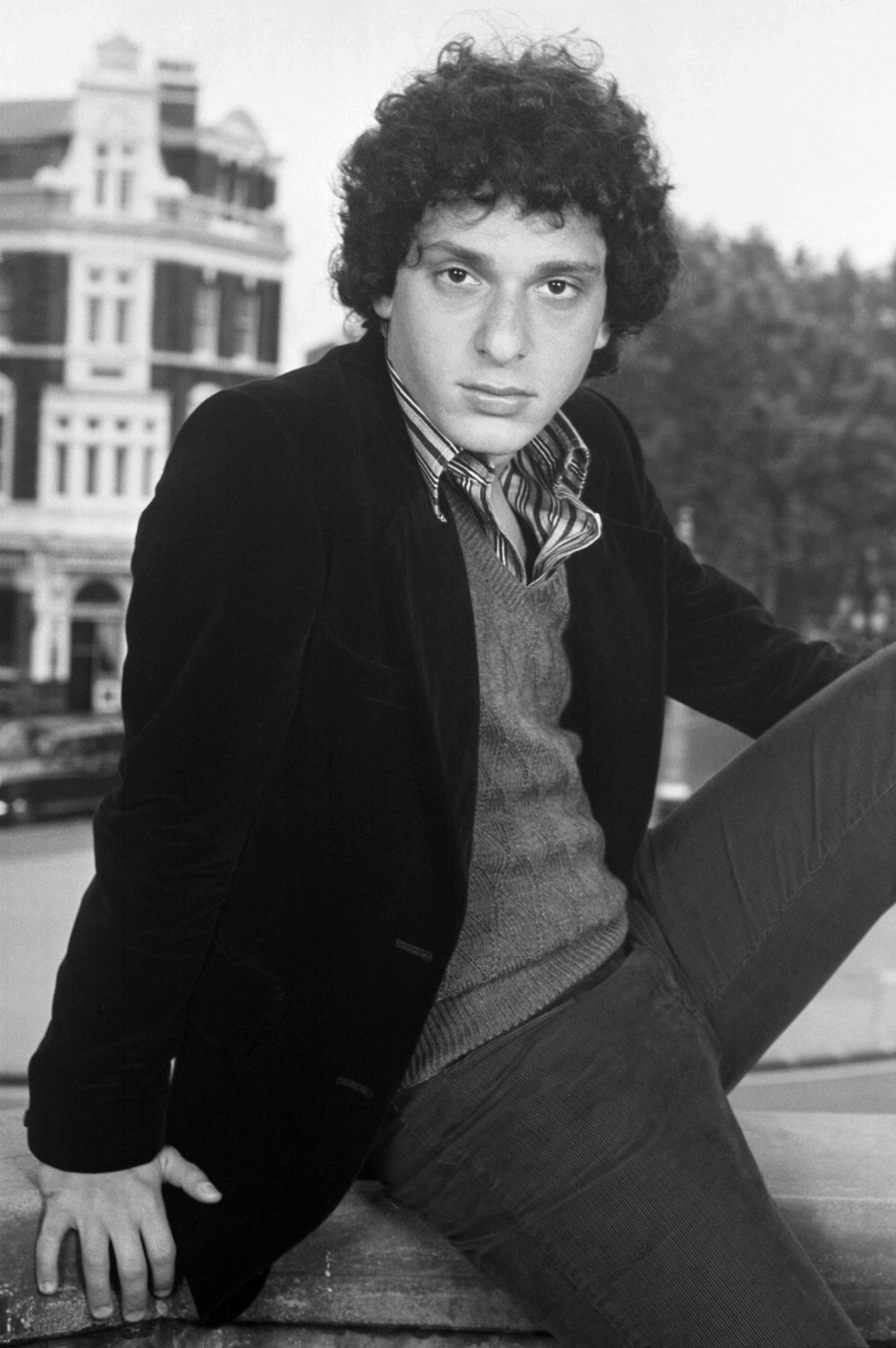
"It's Raining Men" was co-written and co-produced by Paul Jabara (shown here in 1972 at age 24)

Paul Jabara and Paul Shaffer wrote the song over the course of one afternoon in 1979, intending it for Donna Summer, who had scored a hit with "Last Dance" (1978).

As Shaffer later recalled, Summer had, however, recently become a born-again Christian and rejected the song as "blasphemous".

The song was then offered to Diana Ross, Cher, and Barbra Streisand, all of whom also declined it.

In 1982, the song was offered to the Weather Girls (then known as the Two Tons and formerly known as Two Tons O' Fun). Martha Wash and Izora Armstead of the Two Tons also dismissed the song. Wash recounted:

"We thought it was a crazy song — in fact, too crazy to record. I kept saying, 'It's raining men? Really? Are you kidding me?'... I just did not think people would buy it... That's why I kept saying no."

The duo Two Tons eventually recorded the song in 90 minutes after Jabara persistently pleaded with them to record the song. The Waters Sisters (Julia Waters Tillman and Maxine Waters Willard), Stephanie Spruill, and Zenobia Conkerite performed background vocals on the chorus of the song.

== Composition ==
"It's Raining Men"
A sample of the hook "It's Raining Men".

"It's Raining Men" is a Hi-NRG, post-disco and gospel song, that draws influence from soul and EDM. While it released after disco declined in the mainstream, the song has still been associated with the genre by some critics. According to the sheet music published at Musicnotes.com by Alfred Music Publishing, the song is composed in the key of F minor. It uses one minor chord, F minor, while the rest of the notes are major chords. The song is set in the time signature of common time with a tempo is 138 beats per minute. Wash sang the lead vocals in the song. Her vocal range spans around two octaves in the song, from the low note of F3 to the high note of F5.

"It's Raining Men" follows a verse–pre-chorus–chorus structure. The song begins with a brief, spoken word introduction before entering the first verse. Each verse transitions into a pre-chorus that builds harmonic tension and leads into the chorus, where the main hook ("It's raining men! Hallelujah!") appears. After the second verse and chorus, a short bridge leads into a final, extended chorus, featuring vocal ad-libs and layered backing vocals.

== Release ==
"It's Raining Men" was first released to U.S. dance club DJs in mid-1982. The single was then released in the United States on 7" single and 12" single in 1982. Shortly after the single's release, the Two Tons changed their name to the Weather Girls amid press and fan confusion, after the duo introduced themselves as "the weather girls" in the song's introduction. In 1993, a then-newly recorded version of "It's Raining Men" was released by the Weather Girls, now composed of Armstead and her daughter Dynelle Rhodes, on their sixth album Double Tons of Fun (1993).

In 2005, a live version of the song was released on the Weather Girls' ninth album Totally Wild! This version features vocals by Dynelle Rhodes and then-newly added member Ingrid Arthur. In 2012, the same lineup of the Weather Girls released "It's Raining Men - 2012" (stylized as "It's Raining Men 2K12"). The song is based in the house music genre produced by Sebo Reed.

== Commercial performance ==
"It's Raining Men" was a commercial success in the United States. The song spent a total of eleven weeks on Billboard's Hot 100, ultimately peaking at forty-six on March 5, 1983. Although it had not yet been released to retail stores, the single gained much attention based on heavy rotation alone. On the chart dated December 24, 1982, "It's Raining Men" reached number one on the Billboard Dance chart and held the top position for a total of two weeks. The song spent a total of twenty-two weeks on the Dance chart. After eighteen weeks on the R&B charts, "It’s Raining Men" peaked at number thirty-four. The song was also a huge success in the United Kingdom. The song peaked at number two on the UK Singles Chart, and became certified platinum for sales and streaming figures exceeding 600,000 units in the United Kingdom.

== Music video ==
=== Production ===
The music video for "It's Raining Men", released in the winter of 1982, was directed by Gary Keys and filmed in an abandoned building in New York City. Due to limited support from Columbia Records, "It's Raining Men" was a low-budget video. Wash described the video's conception: "God, that was a cheesy video! We filmed it in an abandoned building [in NYC] in the dead of winter. There was no heat and everybody was wearing [winter] coats. That part in the video where we fall out of the sky, well, we landed on these mattresses and found out [the next day] they were infested with bugs. For days afterwards Izora and I were scratching [ourselves]! It was awful!"

=== Synopsis ===
The opening sequence of the video features the Weather Girls in a news station. The duo give a forecast prediction that it will rain men from the sky. After looking out of the station window to see the sky raining men, the Weather Girls leap out of the window with their umbrellas to join the men. Several dancers are seen in the music video performing choreography. Another scene features the Weather Girls wearing lingerie on a heart-shaped bed surrounded by and being adored by men. The closing scene shows the duo performing with the male dancers and extras in the music video.

== Impact and legacy ==
"It's definitely stood the test of time. Now you have the grandparents who love the song, the parents who love the song and the grandkids who love the song. They all get up and dance."

— Martha Wash reflects on "It's Raining Men" during her Huffington Post cover story in 2011.

VH1 ranked the song at number 35 on their list of the "100 Greatest Dance Songs" in 2000, and also at number 35 in their "100 Greatest One-Hit Wonders of the 1980s" ranking in 2009. Paste magazine ranked the song number 12 in their list of the "60 Best Dancefloor Classics" in February 2017. Rolling Stone listed it number 90 on their ranking of "The 100 Greatest Debut Singles of All Time" in 2020 and number 88 on their list of the "200 Greatest Dance Songs of All Time" in 2022.

"It's Raining Men" has often been perceived as a gay anthem. A campaign was launched on Facebook on January 19, 2014, to get the song to UK number one in response to a UKIP councillor blaming recent UK floods and adverse weather on divine retribution for the British government's introduction of gay marriage. The campaign was reported widely by some press, and the Weather Girls' version reached number 21 on the first day of the chart week. The song re-entered the UK Singles Chart in 2014 at number 31. In 2017, Rolling Stone included the song on their "25 Essential LGBTQ Pride Songs" list. In 2018, Billboard magazine ranked the song at number 47 on their "50 Best Gay Anthems of All Time" list, while in 2025, they ranked it number 91 in their "The 100 Greatest LGBTQ+ Anthems of All Time" list. The Gay UK ranked the song at number two on their "Top 40 Gay Anthems for Pride" list. Time Out ranked it number 19 on their list of "The 50 Best Gay Songs to Celebrate Pride All Year Long" in 2022.

In 1983, "It's Raining Men" was nominated for a Grammy Award in the category Best R&B Performance By A Duo Or Group With Vocal. In June 2017, "It's Raining Men" entered on the Spotify Rewind charts and peaked at number one.

== Track listings and formats ==
"It's Raining Men" – 7" and 12" single
No.	Title	Length
1.	"It's Raining Men" (vox)	5:27
2.	"It's Raining Men" (instrumental)	5:29
Total length:		10:56

== Personnel ==
- Izora Armstead, (Note: Credited as Izora Redman.) Martha Wash – lead vocals
- Bob Esty – keyboards, synthesizer
- Greg Mathieson – piano
- Paul Delph – synthesizer
- Lee Sklar – bass guitar
- Michael Landau – guitar
- Carlos Vega – drums
- Stephanie Spruill, Julia Waters-Tillman, Maxine Waters-Willard, Zenobia Conkerite – background vocals

== Charts ==
=== Weekly charts ===
1982–1984 weekly chart performance for "It's Raining Men"
Chart (1982–1984)	Peak position
Australia (Kent Music Report)	16
France (IFOP)	54
Ireland (IRMA)	5
Japan (Oricon)	28
Netherlands (Dutch Top 40)	31
Netherlands (Single Top 100)	46
New Zealand (Recorded Music NZ)	13
Norway (VG-lista)	8
UK Singles (Official Charts)	2
US Billboard Hot 100	46
US Dance/Disco Top 80 (Billboard)	1
US Hot Black Singles (Billboard)	34
West Germany (GfK)	43

2001 weekly chart performance for "It's Raining Men"
Chart (2001)	Peak position
Switzerland (Schweizer Hitparade)	95

2013 weekly chart performance for "It's Raining Men"
Chart (2013)	Peak position
Slovenia (SloTop50)	43

2014 weekly chart performance for "It's Raining Men"
Chart (2014)	Peak position
UK Singles (Official Charts)	31

=== Decade-end charts ===
Decade-end chart performance for "It's Raining Men"
Chart (1980–1989)	Peak position
Spotify Rewind	1

== Certifications ==
Certifications and sales for "It's Raining Men"
Region	Certification	Certified units/sales
Denmark (IFPI Danmark)	Platinum	90,000^{‡}
Germany (BVMI)	Gold	250,000^{‡}
New Zealand (RMNZ)	Platinum	30,000^{‡}
Spain (Promusicae)	Gold	30,000^{‡}
United Kingdom (BPI) Physical 1984 sales	Gold	500,000^{^}
United Kingdom (BPI) Sales since 2006	Platinum	600,000^{‡}
^{‡} Sales+streaming figures based on certification alone.

== Martha Wash and RuPaul version ==
"It's Raining Men... The Sequel"

Single by Martha Wash featuring RuPaul

from the album The Collection and RuPaul's Go-Go Box Classics
- Released: October 31, 1997
- Genre: Eurodance
- Length: 3:45
- Label: Logic; Rhino
- Songwriters: Paul Jabara; Paul Shaffer
- Producer: Gary Haase

Martha Wash singles chronology
"Something Goin' On" (1997)	"It's Raining Men... The Sequel" (1997)	"Catch the Light" (1998)

RuPaul singles chronology
"Celebrate" (1997)	"It's Raining Men... The Sequel" (1997)	"Come" (1998)

Music video
- "It's Raining Men... The Sequel" on YouTube

"It's Raining Men" was covered by Weather Girls' member Martha Wash and American drag queen and singer RuPaul in 1997. The song was retitled "It's Raining Men... The Sequel", and released as the lead single for Wash's compilation album The Collection (1998). The song was also released on RuPaul's Go-Go Box Classics (1998).

=== Critical reception ===
Larry Flick from Billboard wrote that Wash "sounds like she's having a blast as she revisits a hit from her heyday as half of the Weather Girls." He noted that "the novel hook of this new recording is the appearance of RuPaul, whose freewheeling vamps are saucy good fun." He also added that Producer Gary "Headman" Haas "doesn't deviate far from the original recording's disco sound, leaving a posse of remixers to investigate a variety of more trendy ideas."

=== Music video ===
The opening sequence of the accompanying music video for "It's Raining Men... The Sequel" features Wash and RuPaul as the news anchors of the Weather Center. The duo give a forecast prediction that it will rain men from the sky, with several field reporters also reporting similar information. Wash, as a meteorologist and weatherwoman, performs the song in front of a digital map. Several people from around the world start to feel the effects of the forecast and some women are even shown collecting men that fall from the sky into baskets. Several men also appear in the music video, dancing to the song.

=== Track listings and formats ===
"It's Raining Men... The Sequel" – 12" single
No.	Title	Length
1.	"It's Raining Men... The Sequel" (Calle & Rizzo mix)	3:22
2.	"It's Raining Men... The Sequel" (Dillon & Dickins Hers & Hers vox mix)	7:36
3.	"It's Raining Men... The Sequel" (Super Popalicious club mix)	6:44
4.	"It's Raining Men... The Sequel" (Headman extended mix)	5:30
Total length:		22:12

"It's Raining Men... The Sequel" – Maxi single
No.	Title	Length
1.	"It's Raining Men... The Sequel" (LP version)	3:44
2.	"It's Raining Men... The Sequel" (Calle & Rizzo mix)	6:03
3.	"It's Raining Men... The Sequel" (Dillon & Dickins Hers & Hers vox mix)	7:36
4.	"It's Raining Men... The Sequel" (Super Popalicious club mix)	6:44
5.	"It's Raining Men... The Sequel" (Headman extended mix)	5:30
Total length:		28:37

=== Charts ===
"It's Raining Men... The Sequel"

Weekly chart performance "It's Raining Men... The Sequel"
Chart (1998)	Peak position
Australia (ARIA)	64
Europe (Eurochart Hot 100)	46
Scotland (OCC)	16
UK Singles (Official Charts)	21
US Dance Club Play (Billboard)	22
US Hot R&B Singles (Billboard)	105
US Maxi-Singles Sales (Billboard)	1

== Geri Halliwell version ==
"It's Raining Men"

Single by Geri Halliwell

from the album Scream If You Wanna Go Faster and Bridget Jones's Diary: Music from the Motion Picture
- B-side: "Brave New World"; "I Was Made That Way"
- Released: April 30, 2001
- Genre: Dance-pop
- Length: 4:18 (album version); 3:47 (radio version)
- Label: EMI
- Songwriters: Paul Jabara; Paul Shaffer
- Producer: Stephen Lipson

Geri Halliwell singles chronology
"Bag It Up" (2000)	"It's Raining Men" (2001)	"Scream If You Wanna Go Faster" (2001)

Music video
- "It's Raining Men" on YouTube

"It's Raining Men" was released on April 30, 2001, as the first single from British singer Geri Halliwell's second solo album, Scream if You Wanna Go Faster (2001). It was also featured as the lead single internationally to the soundtrack of the 2001 film Bridget Jones's Diary. The single became Halliwell's fourth consecutive number-one hit single on the UK Singles Chart and became her most successful solo single to date.

=== Background ===
Halliwell commented: "It was really odd because I was all ready to go with my new album. I had the single, I had the video idea all ready and then the producers of the movie said to me, 'do you want to record It's Raining Men for the soundtrack?' I thought it would be fun and I love Bridget Jones cos I've read both books and so I just did it really quickly. They all loved it and wanted it to be a single and I thought it was a bit of a gift, so I released it".

=== Reception ===
Halliwell's version received positive reviews by music critics, experienced international success and hit the top ten in over two dozen countries around the world, going to number one in several of them. In the United Kingdom, "It's Raining Men" debuted at number-one on the UK Singles Chart and stayed there for two weeks. It became Halliwell's fourth consecutive number-one single in the UK, selling 155,000 units in its first week and 80,000 in its second week. Halliwell became the first solo British female artist to have four number-one singles in the United Kingdom, a record she held until 2014. Overall the single went on to sell 449,000 copies in Britain alone, becoming the 13th-best-seller of 2001 and Halliwell's most successful single worldwide.

The song was successful outside the United Kingdom. In Flemish Belgium, the song stayed at number one for four weeks and was the best-selling single of 2001. The single reached number one in France for five weeks, receiving a Diamond certification from the Syndicat National de l'Édition Phonographique (SNEP). With this song, Halliwell won the International Song of the Year award at the 2002 NRJ Music Awards in France. The cover was also a major success in Walloon Belgium, Ireland, Italy, Poland, and Switzerland.

A remix of the song, the Almighty Mix from the Toshiba-EMI series Dance Mania, volume 20, was also featured in the 2002 Japanese video games, DDRMAX2 Dance Dance Revolution 7thMix and Dance Dance Revolution EXTREME. This version of the song was used as the theme song in the advertisements for New Talent Singing Awards Vancouver Audition 2003. In July 2006, the song entered at number 79 on the Mexican Digital Sales Chart, spending two weeks inside the Top 100.

=== Music video ===
Halliwell was inspired by the 1980 film Fame and by the 1983 film Flashdance for the video. It was directed by Jim Canty and Jake-Sebastian Wynne. The video stars Halliwell ready to dance in an audition for the judges and in the chorus, a big group of dancers join her. Near the end of the video, Halliwell and the dancers perform a dance routine in the rain.

=== Live performances ===
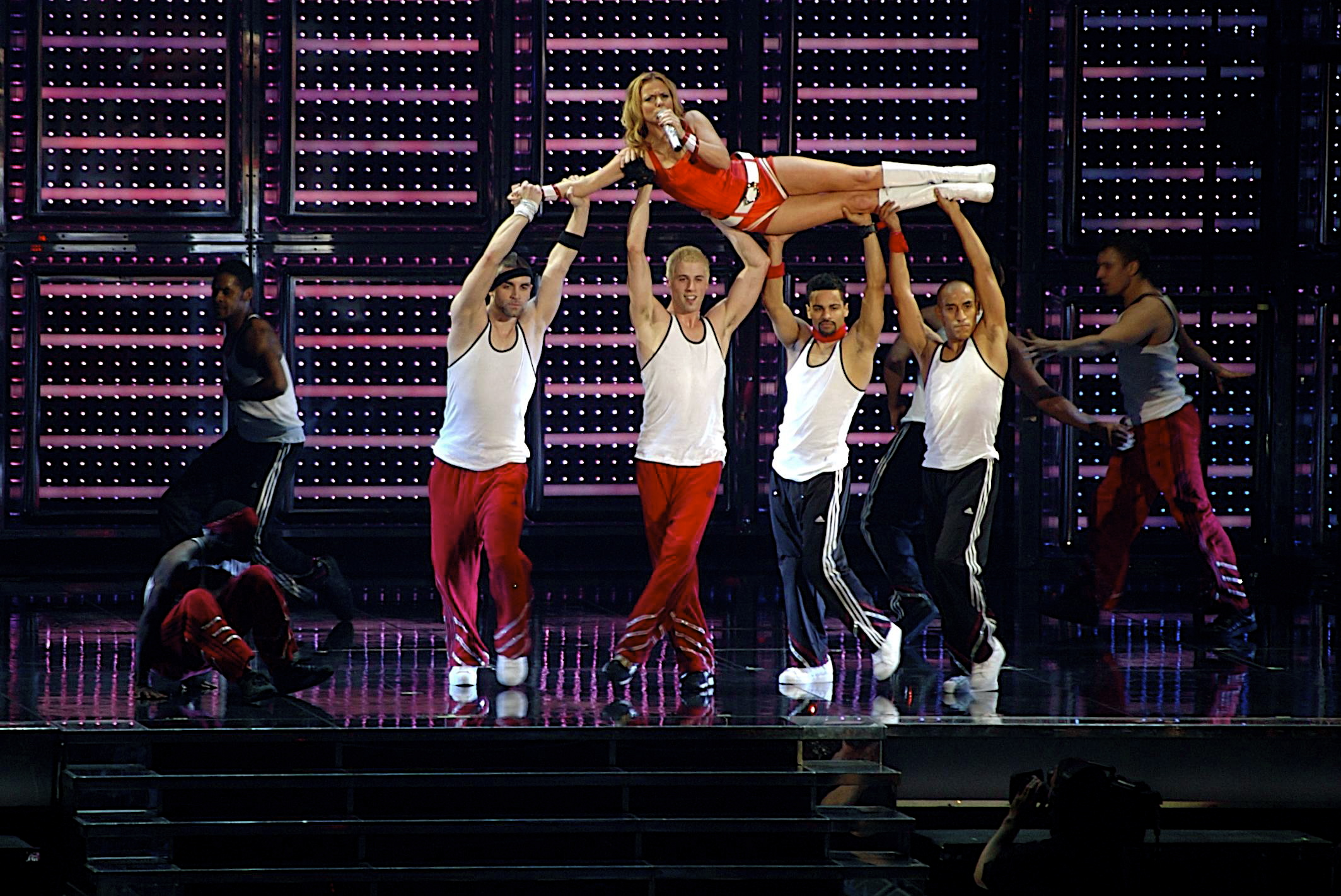
Geri Halliwell performing "It's Raining Men" during The Return of the Spice Girls Tour in 2008

To promote the single, Halliwell performed the song on Top of the Pops, Comet Awards 2001, Musica Sí, Big Brother Germany, Party in the Park, Live & Kicking, Loft Story, Pepsi Chart Russia, CD:UK and Tickled Pink. Halliwell also performed the song on The Return of the Spice Girls world tour as her solo number.

=== Track listings ===
- UK CD1
1. "It's Raining Men" – 4:18
2. "I Was Made That Way" – 4:45
3. "Brave New World" – 4:10
4. "It's Raining Men" (video) – 4:18
- UK CD2; Australasian CD single; Italian 12-inch single
1. "It's Raining Men" (album version) – 4:18
2. "It's Raining Men" (Bold & Beautiful Glamour mix edit) – 4:47
3. "It's Raining Men" (Almighty mix edit) – 3:46
4. "It's Raining Men" (D-Bop Tall & Blonde mix edit) – 6:55
- UK cassette single
1. "It's Raining Men" – 4:18
2. "I Was Made That Way" – 4:45
3. "Brave New World" – 4:10
- European CD single
1. "It's Raining Men" (album version) – 4:19
2. "Brave New World" – 4:10

=== Charts ===
==== Weekly charts ====
2001–2003 weekly chart performance for "It's Raining Men"
Chart (2001–2003)	Peak position
Australia (ARIA)	4
Austria (Ö3 Austria Top 40)	5
Belgium (Ultratop 50 Flanders)	1
Belgium (Ultratop 50 Wallonia)	2
Canada (Nielsen SoundScan)	11
Canada CHR (Nielsen BDS)	19
Croatia International (HRT) (Note: Only a partial archive of the Croatian chart is available so it is possible that the single had a higher peak.)	7
Denmark (Tracklisten)	6
Europe (Eurochart Hot 100)	2
Finland (Suomen virallinen lista)	7
France (SNEP)	1
Germany (GfK)	5
Greece (IFPI)	3
Hungary (Mahasz)	4
Ireland (IRMA)	1
Italy (FIMI)	1
Netherlands (Dutch Top 40)	4
Netherlands (Single Top 100)	4
New Zealand (Recorded Music NZ)	15
Norway (VG-lista)	13
Poland Airplay (Music & Media)	13
Poland (PifPaf)	1
Portugal (AFP)	4
Romania (Romanian Top 100)	2
Russia Airplay (InterMedia)	1
Scottish Singles Sales (Official Charts)	1
Spain (Promusicae)	5
Sweden (Sverigetopplistan)	10
Switzerland (Schweizer Hitparade)	4
UK Singles (Official Charts)	1

2024 weekly chart performance for "It's Raining Men"
Chart (2024)	Peak position
Kazakhstan Airplay (TopHit)	41
Poland (Polish Airplay Top 100)	69

2025 weekly chart performance for "It's Raining Men"
Chart (2025)	Peak position
Moldova Airplay (TopHit)	48

==== Monthly charts ====
2024 monthly chart performance for "It's Raining Men"
Chart (2024)	Peak position
Kazakhstan Airplay (TopHit)	54

==== Year-end charts ====
2001 year-end chart performance for "It's Raining Men"
Chart (2001)	Position
Australia (ARIA)	34
Austria (Ö3 Austria Top 40)	37
Belgium (Ultratop 50 Flanders)	1
Belgium (Ultratop 50 Wallonia)	8
Canada (Nielsen SoundScan)	73
Europe (Eurochart Hot 100)	4
France (SNEP)	6
Germany (Media Control)	27
Ireland (IRMA)	6
Netherlands (Dutch Top 40)	39
Netherlands (Single Top 100)	25
Romania (Romanian Top 100)	35
Sweden (Hitlistan)	31
Switzerland (Schweizer Hitparade)	14
UK Singles (OCC)	13

2024 year-end chart performance for "It's Raining Men"
Chart (2024)	Position
Kazakhstan Airplay (TopHit)	77

=== Certifications ===
Certifications and sales for "It's Raining Men"
Region	Certification	Certified units/sales
Australia (ARIA)	Platinum	70,000^{^}
Belgium (BRMA)	2× Platinum	100,000^{*}
France (SNEP)	Diamond	750,000^{*}
Germany (BVMI)	Gold	250,000^{^}
Switzerland (IFPI Switzerland)	Gold	25,000^{^}
United Kingdom (BPI)	Gold	440,000
^{*} Sales figures based on certification alone.^{^} Shipments figures based on certification alone.

=== Release history ===
Release dates and formats for "It's Raining Men"
Region	Date	Format(s)	Label(s)	Ref(s).
United Kingdom	April 30, 2001	CD; cassette	EMI	
Australia	May 28, 2001	CD	EMI	
