= Ride It (Geri Halliwell song) =

2004 single by Geri Halliwell

Single by Geri

from the album Passion
- B-side: "It's Raining Men"
- Released: 22 November 2004
- Genre: Dance-pop
- Length: 3:46
- Label: Innocent; Virgin
- Songwriters: Geri Halliwell; Quiz & Larossi; Savan Kotecha
- Producers: Andreas Romdhane; Ian Masterson; Josef Larossi

Geri singles chronology
"Calling" (2001)	"Ride It" (2004)	"Desire" (2005)

Music video
- "Ride It" on YouTube

"Ride It" is a song recorded by English singer Geri Halliwell (credited mononymously as "Geri") for her third studio album, Passion (2005). It was released on 22 November 2004 by Innocent Records as the first single from the album. "Ride It" was commercially successful in Europe; it peaked at number four in the United Kingdom and reached number three on the Spanish and Scottish charts.

== Critical reception ==
"Ride It" received mixed reviews from music critics. Writing for AllMusic, John Lucas described it as a "fine slice of campy dance-pop, the kind of which Halliwell has always sounded most comfortable with". Music Week staff wrote that although the track was "aimed straight at Kylie's pop audience", it lacked the "sophistication of Minogue's pop masterpieces". John Dingwall from the Daily Record panned it as a "ridiculous pop song", noting it "seems the former Spice Girl is so desperate for a pop comeback she has settled for a song which sounds like a Dannii Minogue cast-off".

Matt Potter from Yahoo! Launch gave the single two out of ten stars, and said "Enter Halliwell, and her latest attempt to present herself as a sexy siren, all attitude and independence. It's not as if it's a bad song, either - think "Life Is A Roller Coaster", crossed with "Sisters Are Doing It for Themselves" but minus a proper chorus - but the steely, tears-at-a-hen-party desperation of Halliwell's delivery makes this the musical equivalent of getting the eighteenth call in one evening from a girl you met once at a party".

== Chart performance ==
Due to the midweek position of number three, "Ride It" was predicted to peak within the top three, but due to competition from Girls Aloud, Destiny's Child, and Lemar, the song debuted and peaked at number four on the UK Singles Chart. It gave Halliwell the best ever opening sequence for a female recording artist on the chart, with all her first 16 singles entering the top 10. "Ride It" was the 143rd-best-selling single of 2004 in the United Kingdom. The song also reached number three on both the Spanish and Scottish charts. In the Commonwealth of Independent States (CIS), the song peaked at number two and remained on the Tophit chart for 39 weeks, 31 of which were in the top 100.

== Music video ==
The accompanying music video for the song was directed by Luca Tommassini and was filmed in Milan in September 2004. In it, Halliwell dresses as a policegirl and spanks a male model with a truncheon before flashing her bra. She also sticks the truncheon between the man's legs. There is also a close-up of lifting her pink dress and shaking her bottom.

TV executives were worried the video would be too sexual for Top of the Pops Saturday viewers, which was watched by six to twelve year olds. The BBC then censored the video, saying: "TOTP Saturday will air Geri's video without a couple of unsuitable shots".

Entertainment executive Simon Cowell criticized the music video on CD:UK, calling the video "rubbish" as well as "one of the worst videos I've ever seen in my life" whilst also stating, "If I was her record label and that video arrived on my desk, I would throw it in the bin". In response to his criticism, Halliwell wrote to Cowell demanding an explanation for his outburst as well as an apology.

== Live performances ==
To promote the single, Halliwell performed the song on Children in Need, Ant & Dec's Saturday Night Takeaway, Top of the Pops, CD:UK, GMTV, Ministry of Mayhem and This Morning.

== Track listings ==
UK and European CD1

1. "Ride It" – 3:46
2. "It's Raining Men" – 4:18

UK and European CD2, Australian CD single

1. "Ride It" – 3:46
2. "Ride It" (Hex Hector 7-inch mix) – 3:45
3. "Ride It" (Ian Masterson extended) – 6:33
4. "Ride It" (Maloney remix) – 5:35

UK 12-inch single

A. "Ride It" (Hex Hector 12-inch mix) – 7:47
B. "Ride It" (Full Intention mix) – 8:10

== Personnel ==
Personnel are adapted from the liner notes of Passion.

- Geri Halliwell – vocals, songwriting
- Quiz & Larossi – songwriting, production, instrumentation
- Savan Kotecha – songwriting
- Andreas Romdhane – production
- Josef Larossi – production
- Ian Masterson – production, mixing, engineering, programming
- Ben Dobie – engineering, programming
- Mitch Stevenson – backing vocals
- Maria Diephuis – backing vocals
- Hannah Robinson – backing vocals
- Magnus Lind – accordion

== Charts ==
=== Weekly charts ===
Weekly chart performance for "Ride It"
Chart (2004–2005)	Peak position
Australia (ARIA)	63
Austria (Ö3 Austria Top 40)	55
Belgium (Ultratip Bubbling Under Flanders)	3
Belgium (Ultratip Bubbling Under Wallonia)	6
CIS Airplay (TopHit)	2
Europe (European Hot 100 Singles)	19
Germany (GfK)	73
Greece (IFPI)	15
Hungary (Editors' Choice Top 40)	12
Ireland (IRMA)	19
Romania (Romanian Top 100)	37
Russia Airplay (TopHit)	4
Scottish Singles Sales (Official Charts)	3
Spain (Promusicae)	3
Switzerland (Schweizer Hitparade)	63
UK Singles (Official Charts)	4

=== Year-end charts ===
2004 year-end chart performance for "Ride It"
Chart (2004)	Position
CIS Airplay (TopHit)	38
Russia Airplay (TopHit)	24
UK Singles (OCC)	143

2005 year-end chart performance for "Ride It"
Chart (2005)	Position
CIS Airplay (TopHit)	175
Russia Airplay (TopHit)	176

== Release history ==
Release history and formats for "Ride It"
Region	Date	Format(s)	Label(s)	Ref.
United Kingdom	22 November 2004	CD	Innocent; Virgin	
Australia	28 February 2005	CD	Innocent; Virgin	
