= Calling (Geri Halliwell song) =

2001 single by Geri Halliwell

Single by Geri Halliwell

from the album Scream If You Wanna Go Faster
- B-side: "Getting Better"; "Destiny"
- Released: 26 November 2001
- Length: 4:25
- Label: EMI
- Songwriters: Geri Halliwell; Peter-John Vettese
- Producer: Stephen Lipson

Geri Halliwell singles chronology
"Scream If You Wanna Go Faster" (2001)	"Calling" (2001)	"Ride It" (2004)

Music video
- "Calling" on YouTube

"Calling" is a song by British singer Geri Halliwell. It was written by Halliwell and Peter-John Vettese for her second album, Scream If You Wanna Go Faster (2001), while production was helmed by Stephen Lipson. The song was released as the third and final single from the album. Just like Halliwell's previous single, "Scream If You Wanna Go Faster", the success for "Calling" was limited. In certain regions, the song was released in a French version titled "Calling (Au nom de l'amour)".

== Background ==
"Calling" was written by Geri Halliwell along with Peter-John Vettese, while production was helmed by Stephen Lipson. Halliwell called it her favorite song on the album. After she recorded a demo version of the song, she rushed over to singer and personal friend George Michael in London and played it to him. She commented that Michael would only offer praise if he really thought it was deserved. As he was "brutally honest" and it could be hard to take, she was so confident about this song that she was willing to risk it. When the song ended, he said, "You know what, Geri, that's very good". According to Halliwell, "from George Michael that means something. I really believed I had a winner."

== Chart performance ==
Released on 26 November 2001, "Calling" debuted and peaked at number seven on the UK Singles Chart on 2 December 2001, lasting 10 weeks on the chart. Altogether, the song sold 70,515 copies and became the 192nd best selling single of 2001 in the United Kingdom. Elsewhere, "Calling" entered the majority of the charts it appeared on, peaking at six on the Hungarian Rádiós Top 40 and at number 11 in the Wallonian region of Belgium. In her autobiography Just for the Record, Halliwell revealed that the chart position upset her as "Calling" was her favourite song from the album, and she was certain that it was an assured number one. Due to her disappointment with the chart position of the single, no further singles were released from Scream If You Wanna Go Faster and Halliwell moved to Los Angeles, California for several months and took a break from the music industry.

== Music video ==
The black and white music video for "Calling" was directed by Pierluca DeCario and filmed in Sant Vicenç de Montalt, Spain in October 2001. It shows Halliwell, dressed with a black sweater and barefoot, singing the song while lying in a meadow and standing and walking in front of concrete walls. The video was released on 1 November 2001.

== Track listings ==
UK CD1
No.	Title	Length
1.	"Calling"	4:25
2.	"Getting Better"	3:07
3.	"Destiny"	4:29
4.	"Calling" (video)

UK CD2
No.	Title	Length
1.	"Calling"	4:25
2.	"Calling" (WIP 'Coeur de lion' edit)	3:45
3.	"Calling" (Metro 7-inch)	3:43
4.	"Calling" (Mauve's Factor 25 Mix)	3:55
5.	"Calling" (Mareeko remix edit)	3:58

UK cassette single
No.	Title	Length
1.	"Calling"	4:25
2.	"Getting Better"	3:07
3.	"Destiny"	4:29

European CD single
No.	Title	Length
1.	"Calling"	4:25
2.	"Getting Better"	3:07

French CD single
No.	Title	Length
1.	"Calling (Au nom de l'amour)"	4:21
2.	"Calling"	4:24

== Personnel ==
Personnel are taken from the Scream If You Wanna Go Faster album booklet.

- Geri Halliwell – writing
- Peter-John Vettese – writing, keyboards, original production, programming
- Nick Ingman – string arrangement
- Gavyn Wright – concertmaster
- Steve Price – string engineering
- Stephen Lipson – production, programming
- Heff Moraes – mixing, engineering

== Charts ==
=== Weekly charts ===
Chart (2001–2002)	Peak position
Austria (Ö3 Austria Top 40)	28
Belgium (Ultratip Bubbling Under Flanders)	3
Belgium (Ultratop 50 Wallonia)	11
Europe (Eurochart Hot 100)	18
France (SNEP) "Calling (au nom de l'amour)"	22
Germany (GfK)	48
Hungary (Rádiós Top 40)	6
Hungary (Single Top 40)	12
Ireland (IRMA)	37
Italy (FIMI)	30
Romania (Romanian Top 100)	19
Scottish Singles Sales (Official Charts)	10
Switzerland (Schweizer Hitparade)	21
UK Singles (Official Charts)	7

=== Year-end charts ===
Chart (2001)	Position
UK Singles (OCC)	192

Chart (2002)	Position
Belgium (Ultratop 50 Wallonia)	89
