= Half of Me (Geri Halliwell song) =

2013 song by Geri Hallwell

Single by Geri Halliwell
- Released: 25 October 2013
- Recorded: 2013
- Genre: Pop
- Length: 3:11
- Label: Sony Music Australia
- Songwriters: Geri Halliwell; DNA Songs
- Producer: DNA Songs

Geri Halliwell singles chronology
"Desire" (2005)	"Half of Me" (2013)	"Angels In Chains" (2017)

Music video
- "Half of Me" on YouTube

"Half of Me" is a song by British singer-songwriter Geri Halliwell. It was released on 25 October 2013 by Sony Music Australia. The song marked Halliwell's first single release in eight years since her 2005 single "Desire".

== Background ==
While residing in Australia as part of the judging panel for Australia's Got Talent, Halliwell co-wrote the song with Australian songwriting duo DNA Songs. Halliwell described the song as a mix of "love, hope and optimism, with a splash of humour."

== Release ==
In September 2013, Halliwell signed with Sony Music Australia and it was announced that she would release her new single "Half of Me" exclusively in Australia as the lead single from her upcoming album. The first two live performances of "Half of Me" took place in October 2013; the first was a private free gig at the Beresford Hotel in Sydney and the second was during the Nine Network programme The Footy Show on 3 October 2013.

After the song's commercial failure, Halliwell opted not to perform the song on Australia's Got Talent or promote it any further, writing on her blog that she wanted to "dust [her]self off".

== Reception ==
=== Critical response ===
Mike Wass of Idolator gave "Half of Me" a positive response describing it as a "quirky mid-tempo pop song [that] captures the ginger diva’s bawdy humor and undeniable charm with flair and originality." Eric Shorey of NewNowNext stated "Ginger Spice is riding the waves of two big trends: redheads and 90′s nostalgia. But that doesn’t mean her newest single, "Half of Me" isn’t worth listening to."

=== Commercial performance ===
In its first week of release in Australia, "Half of Me" sold 393 copies and debuted at number 281 on the ARIA Singles Chart. The song's chart debut was announced in the news as only the top 100 positions are officially published. Halliwell mistakenly wrote on her blog that the song entered the chart at number 94, which was then reported in foreign media.

== Music video ==
Halliwell dancing with teddy bears in a music video scene.

The music video was filmed on 16 October 2013 and was released on 28 October 2013. In the video, Halliwell is seen dancing with shirtless male models and teddy bears.

Mike Wass of Idolator gave the music video a negative review, stating "Low budget videos are part and parcel of the modern music industry but surely Geri can do better than this? The still stunning 41-year-old looks great and salvages the situation to a certain extent through sheer charisma but parading around gays and lesbians to make a diluted statement about diversity is tired and borderline offensive. Only watch up top if you have a high tolerance for second hand embarrassment." Joel Golby of Heat magazine described the video as "15 people in an overlit studio looking confused by an array of topless men."

The music video for "Half of Me" became Halliwell's 10th solo music video and the 21st music video she appeared in, counting her music videos with the Spice Girls and England United.

== Track listing ==
Digital download

1. "Half of Me" – 3:11

== Charts ==
Chart (2013)	Peak position
Australia (ARIA)	281

== Release history ==
Country	Date	Format	Label
Australia	25 October 2013	Digital download	Sony Music
New Zealand	25 October 2013	Digital download	Sony Music
Vietnam	25 October 2013	Digital download	Sony Music
