= Scream If You Wanna Go Faster =

2001 album by Geri Halliwell

Studio album by Geri Halliwell
- Released: 14 May 2001
- Recorded: May 2000 – January 2001
- Studio: Angel · The Aquarium (London)
- Genres: Pop; dance-pop; pop rock
- Length: 46:55
- Label: EMI
- Producers: Gregg Alexander; Rick Nowels; Stephen Lipson; Absolute

Geri Halliwell chronology
Schizophonic (1999)	Scream If You Wanna Go Faster (2001)	Passion (2005)

Singles from Scream If You Wanna Go Faster
- 1. "It's Raining Men" Released: 30 April 2001; 2. "Scream If You Wanna Go Faster" Released: 30 July 2001; 3. "Calling" Released: 26 November 2001

Scream If You Wanna Go Faster is the second studio album by British singer Geri Halliwell, released on 14 May 2001 by EMI Records. Following the commercial success of her solo debut album Schizophonic two years before, the singer began working on its follow-up with producers such as Gregg Alexander, Rick Nowels, Stephen Lipson, as well as previous collaborators, the duo Absolute. The album's artwork depicting Halliwell on roller skates, holding onto the back of a car, was criticised by road safety organisations, who said the singer was setting a wrong example to children.

Scream If Wanna Go Faster received generally negative reviews from music critics, who criticized the album's production and lyrics, as well as Halliwell's voice range. Commercially, it attained moderate success, reaching the top ten in Greece, Italy and the United Kingdom, whilst being certified Gold by the British Phonographic Industry (BPI) and became the 127th best selling album of 2001 in the latter region.

To promote Scream If You Wanna Go Faster Halliwell embarked on an extensive tour across the United Kingdom and Europe, performing on television shows such as Top of the Pops and festivals like Party in the Park and Popkomm. The album also spawned three singles. Its lead single "It's Raining Men" was also featured as the lead single to the soundtrack of the 2001 film Bridget Jones's Diary and was a success, reaching number one in the UK Singles Chart. Follow-up singles—the title track and "Calling", peaked at numbers eight and seven in the United Kingdom, respectively.

== Background ==
In 1999, after leaving the Spice Girls, Halliwell released her debut solo album Schizophonic. Three of its singles – "Mi Chico Latino", "Lift Me Up" and "Bag It Up" – reached number one on the UK Singles Chart. The album itself was also a success, being certified double platinum by the British Phonographic Industry (BPI) and gold by the Recording Industry Association of America (RIAA). She started working on her second album in 2000, collaborating with production team Absolute, who produced her previous album, as well as new producers such as Gregg Alexander, Rick Nowels and Stephen Lipson. She and Alexander worked together in Los Angeles. Halliwell described the work with Nowels as a "daunting experience", and explained:

"I had never met anyone who was even more pushy about getting things done in the studio than I was but Rick was really driven and worked me very hard. The working day would start at ten and continue until he was satisfied, even if that was one or two in the morning. His songwriting method was simple. He sat me down on a stool in his studio and just told me to sing. He would use the words and melodies I came up with to help me build a song. I was still very uncertain of my talents but Rick's writing style stretched me to my limits. He was a hard taskmasker but I will always be grateful to him, as the work went on. we became great friends. It was very draining".

Halliwell said Scream If You Wanna Go Faster was different from her previous album because she had gone "a much more creative way, I have explored every detail. In this album I have begun to realize that I am an authentic artist able to write songs and do it well. She also described the album as "bright and colourful, but there's deeper meaning underneath if you care and chose to look. Some of it is deep as [a] puddle, some of it is a bottomless pit, like a well". The singer stated that she believed the album was better than her previous one.

== Artwork ==
The album's artwork depicts Halliwell on roller skates, holding onto the back of a Cadillac. Road safety campaigners claimed that the picture was setting a bad example to children and could put their lives at risk. Jane Eason of the Royal Society for the Prevention of Accidents said that it was "very irresponsible behaviour" from the singer. She elaborated, "We are very concerned about kids playing with roller skates, micro scooters or skateboards anywhere near roads, never mind hanging onto the back of cars", explaining that a significant amount of problems resulted when similar tricks were used in a film from the Back to the Future franchise. She finished by saying that considering that Halliwell was banned from driving months before the album's release, she found it "very wrong of her to encourage this kind of thing". Mary Williams of road safety organisation Brake shared similar feelings, stating that, "Geri Halliwell is an icon for young children and our worry is that kids will be tempted to copy her. I would have hoped that Geri and her advisers would have had a little foresight into the possible consequences of such a message". A spokesman for Halliwell found it amazing that the cover was taken so seriously, as it was meant to only be a "bright, fun image". The back cover picture featured Halliwell bellowing out the song titles through a megaphone. By each song lyric in the album sleeve, it is specified whether the song is "for the heart", "sexy", "to make you move" or "for the mind".

== Promotion ==
To promote Scream If You Wanna Go Faster embarked on an extensive tour across the United Kingdom and Europe. She performed several tracks of the album on television shows such as Top of the Pops, and festivals like Festivalbar, Party in the Park, and Popkomm. Halliwell performed in July 2001 at annual fashion event Donna Sotto le Stelle in Rome to promote the album. Halfway through the performance, she jumped into the Fontana della Barcaccia at the Spanish Steps. However, the singer angered locals and was fined by Italian police, who said the singer would be fined £320: "It is an offence to jump into the city fountains and the locals feel why should she be allowed to do so and get away with it?" Halliwell responded by saying "The Italians said I could do it".

== Singles ==
"It's Raining Men" was also featured as the lead single internationally to the soundtrack of the 2001 film Bridget Jones's Diary, was released as the album's lead single in April 2001. Despite low expectations from the record company, and claims that radio stations would not add the track to their playlists, the song debuted at number one on the UK Singles Chart and stayed there for two weeks. It became Halliwell's fourth consecutive number-one single in the United Kingdom, selling 449,000 copies in the region alone, and becoming the 13th best seller of 2001 there. The song was a huge success in France and was certified Diamond by the Syndicat National de l'Édition Phonographique (SNEP). With the song, Geri Halliwell won the "International Song of the Year" award at the 2002 NRJ Music Awards in France.

"Scream If You Wanna Go Faster" was released as the second single from the album on 30 July 2001. In the United Kingdom, it peaked at number eight, which became the lowest-charting single of Halliwell's career at the time, being considered a failure by British press. The single also was not as successful as the previous single across Europe, peaking at numbers 66 and 67 in Switzerland and Germany, despite reaching the top ten in Italy.

Considered by Halliwell herself as her favourite song on the album, "Calling" was chosen as its third and last single in November 2001. It matched the moderate success of previous single, peaking at number seven in the United Kingdom, and reached better positions in Germany and Switzerland than the title track. Due to the underwhelming performance of the single, no further singles from Scream If You Wanna Go Faster were released, and Halliwell moved to Los Angeles for several months and took a break from the music industry.

== Critical reception ==
Professional ratings
Review scores
Source	Rating
AllMusic	2.5/5 stars
The Birmingham Mail	2/5 stars
Dotmusic	6/10
entertainment.ie	1/5 stars
The Guardian	2/5 stars
Hot Press	negative
laut.de	3/5 stars
MTV Asia	3/5 stars
NME	1/10

Scream If You Wanna Go Faster received generally negative reviews from music journalists. Ian Sturgess from the Daily Mirror commented that Halliwell "has gone all out to make a record that's sassy, irreverent and brimming with down 'n' dirty attitude, but which ends up way off the mark". Lisa Oliver of Dotmusic gave the album a mixed review, whilst saying Scream If You Wanna Go Faster "is never going to be a seminal album to change your life and return to again and again. But it is an album you can happily bop along to and sing along with at the top of your lungs during a drunken night out. You can't really ask more of a pop album than that". Jose F. Promis of AllMusic was more positive, noting that despite a few dull moments, the album was "diverse, uplifting, and fun through and through -- only the most hardened and cynical listener would be incapable of finding a song to tap their foot to".

Christian Ward from NME gave the album one out of ten stars, and commented that Scream If You Wanna Go Faster was the sound of "Crisis Spice arriving back in a pop climate she should have dominated after 'Schizophonic'"; Ward also criticized the lyrics on the album. Website entertainment.ie also gave the album one out of five stars, whilst commenting that the album was "an unmitigated disaster: Geri dutifully has a go at rock, reggae, disco and rap, all equally superficial, unconvincing and instantly forgettable. Her vocals are weak, the songs are formulaic and the album as a whole is a boring, irritating mess". Another negative review came from Caroline Sullivan of newspaper The Guardian, who said that even in its "thoughtful" moments, it is "sunk by [its] production-line sound and Halliwell's limited range".

The Birmingham Mail's Alison Jones described the album's tracks as "rang[ing] from the bland to the not so bad", and noted that "the overwhelming impression of this album is that all the lyrics have been written with the aid of the little book of cliches, giving them the resonance and emotional depth of the contents of a fortune cookie". Scream If You Wanna Go Faster was later included on Gigwise's list of the worst albums of the 2000s decade.

== Commercial performance ==
In the United Kingdom, Scream If You Wanna Go Faster sold 9,000 copies on its first day of release, and although it was expected to reach the top three, the album debuted at number five on the UK Albums Chart on 21 May 2001, selling 35,356 copies in its first week. It remained 23 weeks inside the chart, and became the 127th best selling album of 2001 in the United Kingdom. The album was certified Gold by the British Phonographic Industry (BPI). Across Europe, Scream If You Wanna Go Faster attained moderate success. It Austria, it debuted at number 43 on 3 June 2001, reaching its peak of number 30 two weeks later. Similarly in Germany, the album reached number 29 on the album chart. It experienced more success in Greece and Italy, reaching numbers five and eight, respectively. According to Halliwell, the album's low sales made "disappointment hit [her] hard. I was so proud of the record that I wanted the progress I had made to be recognised. The way it was looking, though, it wasn't even going to be heard".

== Track listing ==
Credits adapted from the liner notes of Scream If You Wanna Go Faster.

No.	Title	Writer(s)	Producer	Length
1.	"Scream If You Wanna Go Faster"	Geri Halliwell; Rick Nowels	Nowels	3:38
2.	"Shake Your Bootie Cutie"	Halliwell; Gregg Alexander; Nowels	Alexander; Nowels	4:02
3.	"Calling"	Halliwell; Peter-John Vettese	Stephen Lipson	4:25
4.	"Feels Like Sex"	Halliwell; Tracy Ackerman; Andy Watkins; Paul Wilson	Absolute	3:24
5.	"Circles Round the Moon"	Halliwell; Ackerman; Watkins; Wilson	Absolute	3:59
6.	"Love Is the Only Light"	Halliwell; Jörgen Elofsson; Lipson	Lipson	3:26
7.	"Strength of a Woman"	Halliwell; Nowels	Nowels	4:03
8.	"Don't Call Me Baby"	Halliwell; Watkins; Wilson	Absolute	3:42
9.	"Lovey Dovey Stuff"	Halliwell; Ackerman; Watkins; Wilson	Absolute	3:39
10.	"It's Raining Men"	Paul Jabara; Paul Shaffer	Lipson	4:18
11.	"Heaven and Hell (Being Geri Halliwell)"	Halliwell; Elofsson; Lipson	Lipson	3:31
12.	"I Was Made That Way"	Halliwell; Vettese	Lipson; Vettese	4:47
Total length:				46:55

Japanese bonus track
No.	Title	Writer(s)	Producer	Length
13.	"Brave New World"	Halliwell; Vettese	Vettese; Ian Masterson^{[a]}	4:10

- ^{^a} signifies a remixer

== Personnel ==
- Geri Halliwell – vocals
- Charles Judge – keyboards (1, 7)
- Greg Kurstin – keyboards (1, 2, 7), Farfisa organ (1), clavinet (2)
- Rick Nowels – keyboards (1), acoustic guitars (1, 7), electric guitars (1, 7), bass (1), guitars (2), backing vocals (2, 7), acoustic piano (7)
- Peter-John Vettese – keyboards (3, 13), programming (3, 12, 13), backing vocals (12)
- Stephen Lipson – programming (3, 6, 10, 12), acoustic guitars (6, 12), guitars (11)
- Absolute – all instruments except where noted (4, 5, 8, 9)
- Mike Higham – additional programming (4, 5, 8, 9)
- Steve Sidelnyk – additional programming (4)
- David A. Stewart – keyboards (6, 10, 11)
- Ian Masterson – keyboards (13), programming (13)
- Rusty Anderson – electric guitars (1)
- Tim Pierce – guitars (2)
- Milton McDonald – guitars (4, 5, 8, 9)
- Jörgen Elofsson – acoustic guitars (6, 11)
- Chris Garcia – guitars (7), bass (7), drums (7)
- David Rainger – guitars (10, 11), electric guitars (12)
- Wayne Rodrigues – drum programming (1, 2, 7), keyboards (2)
- Andy Duncan – rhythm programming (10, 11)
- Simon Clarke – flute (5)
- Roddy Lorimer – trumpet (5)
- Nick Ingman – string arrangements (3, 5, 6, 8, 10), string conductor (5, 8)
- Gavyn Wright – string leader (3, 5, 6, 8, 10)
- The Kick Horns – brass (4), brass arrangements (4)
- Danielle Brisebois – backing vocals (2, 7), vocal arrangements (2)
- Sue Ann Carwell – backing vocals (2)
- Tracy Ackerman – backing vocals (4–6, 8, 9, 11, 12)
- Jackie Rawe – backing vocals (4)
- Claudia Fontaine – backing vocals (10)
- Beverley Skeete – backing vocals (10)
- Terry Ronald – additional vocals (13), additional vocal arrangements (13)
- Mitch Stevens – additional vocals (13)

=== Production ===
- Geri Halliwell – executive producer, sleeve concept
- Greg Jakobek – design
- Dean Freeman – photography

Technical credits

- Dave Dale – recording (1, 2, 7)
- Chris Garcia – recording (1, 7)
- Randy Wine – recording (1, 7)
- Dave Way – mixing (1)
- Jonathan Abarbanel – recording (2)
- Ash Howes – mixing (2)
- Heff Moraes – engineer (3, 6, 10–12), mixing (3, 6, 10–12)
- Steve Price – string engineer (3, 6, 10)
- Spike Stent – mixing (4)
- Steve Fitzmaurice – mixing (5, 8, 9)
- Steve MacMillan – mixing (7)
- Ian Masterson – mixing (13)
- Paul Wright – mixing (13)
- Wayne Rodrigues – Pro Tools editing (1, 2, 7), recording (2)
- Matt Fields – mix assistant (4)
- Keith Uddin – mix assistant (4, 5, 8, 9)
- Paul "B-Dub" Walton – mix assistant (4)

== Charts ==
=== Weekly charts ===
Chart (2001)	Peak position
Australian Albums (ARIA)	55
Austrian Albums (Ö3 Austria)	30
Canadian Albums (Nielsen)	43
European Albums (Music & Media)	14
French Albums (SNEP)	133
German Albums (Offizielle Top 100)	29
Greek Albums (IFPI)	5
Hungarian Albums (MAHASZ)	33
Irish Albums (IRMA)	15
Italian Albums (FIMI)	15
Scottish Albums (Official Charts)	4
Spanish Albums (PROMUSICAE)	20
Swiss Albums (Schweizer Hitparade)	22
UK Albums (Official Charts)	5

=== Year-end charts ===
Chart (2001)	Position
Italian Albums (FIMI)	82
UK Albums (OCC)	127

== Certifications ==
Region	Certification	Certified units/sales
France (SNEP)	Gold	100,000^{*}
United Kingdom (BPI)	Gold	100,000^{^}
^{*} Sales figures based on certification alone.^{^} Shipments figures based on certification alone.

== Book sources ==
- Halliwell, Geri (2003). Just for the Record. Ebury Press. ISBN 978-0-091-88804-6.
- Sinclair, David (2010). Spice Girls Revisited: How The Spice Girls Reinvented Pop. Omnibus Press. ISBN 978-1-846-09068-4.
